= Culture of Bengal =

Overview of the Bengali culture

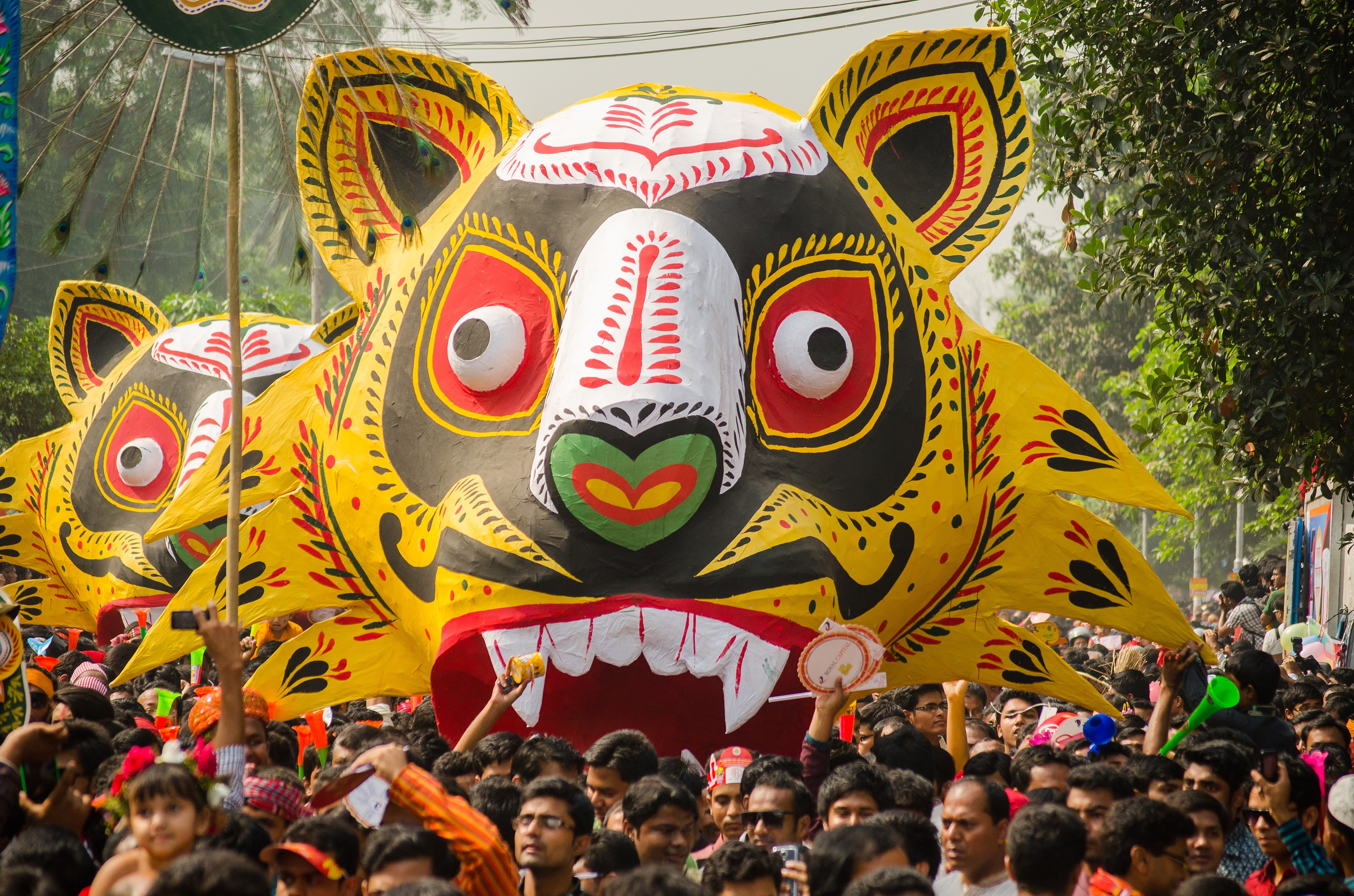
Pohela Boishakh, Bengali New Year celebration.

The culture of Bengal defines the cultural heritage of the Bengali people native to eastern regions of the Indian subcontinent, mainly what is today Bangladesh and the Indian states of West Bengal, Assam's Barak Valley, Tripura, parts of Jharkhand, where they form the dominant ethnolinguistic group and the Bengali language is the official and primary language. Bengal has a recorded history of 1,400 years.

The Bengalis are the dominant ethnolinguistic group. The Bengal region has been a historical melting point, blending indigenous traditions with cosmopolitan influences from pan-Indian subcontinental empires]]) became the capital of Mughal Bengal (Bengal Subah) and the commercial (financial) capital (1610-1757) of Mughal India. Dhaka is the largest and richest Bengali (Bangali) mega city in the world and also the 3rd largest and richest mega city in (Indian sub continent) after Mumbai (Bombay or MMR) and Delhi (NCR). Dhaka is a Beta (β) Global City (Moderate Economic Centre). As a part of the Bengal Presidency, Bengal also hosted the region's most advanced political and cultural centers during British rule.

== Fine arts ==
=== Performing arts ===
==== Music ====
Bengal has produced leading figures of Indian classical music, including Alauddin Khan, Ravi Shankar and Ali Akbar Khan. Common musical instruments include the sitar, tabla and sarod. The Baul tradition is a unique regional folk heritage. The most prominent practitioner was Lalon Shah. Other folk music forms include Gombhira, Bhatiali and Bhawaiya (Jhumur). Folk music in Bengal is often accompanied by the ektara, a one-stringed instrument. Other instruments include the dotara, dhol, bamboo flute, and tabla. Songs written by Rabindranath Tagore (Rabindra Sangeet) and Kazi Nazrul Islam (Nazrul geeti) are highly popular. Bangladesh is the center of Bangla rock, as well as indie, Sufi rock and fusion folk music.

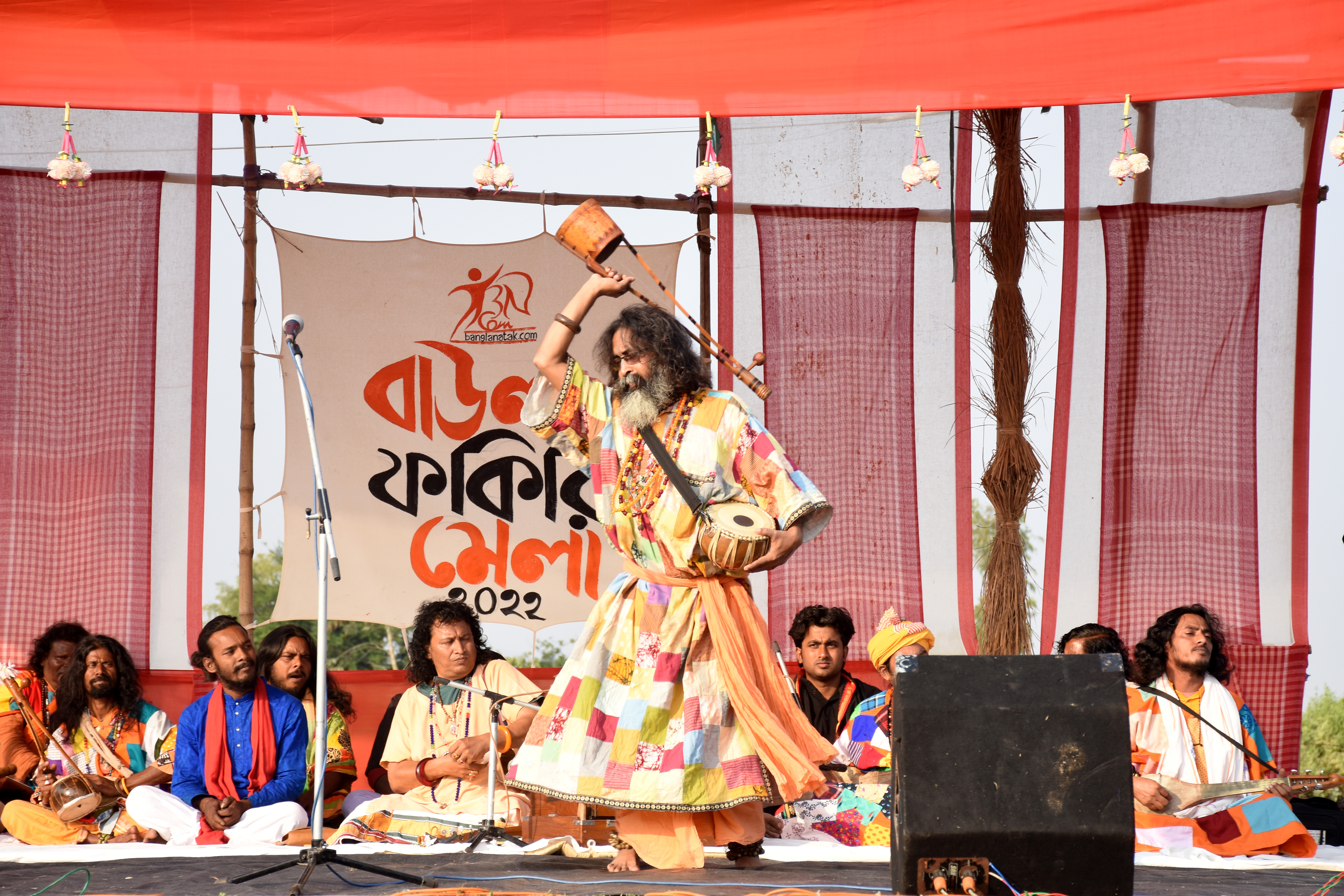
The mystic Baul song

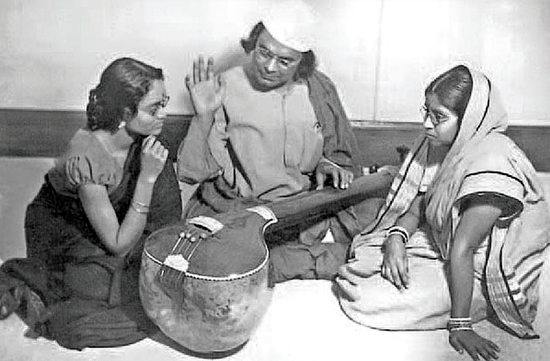
Nazrul teaching Nazrul Sangeet

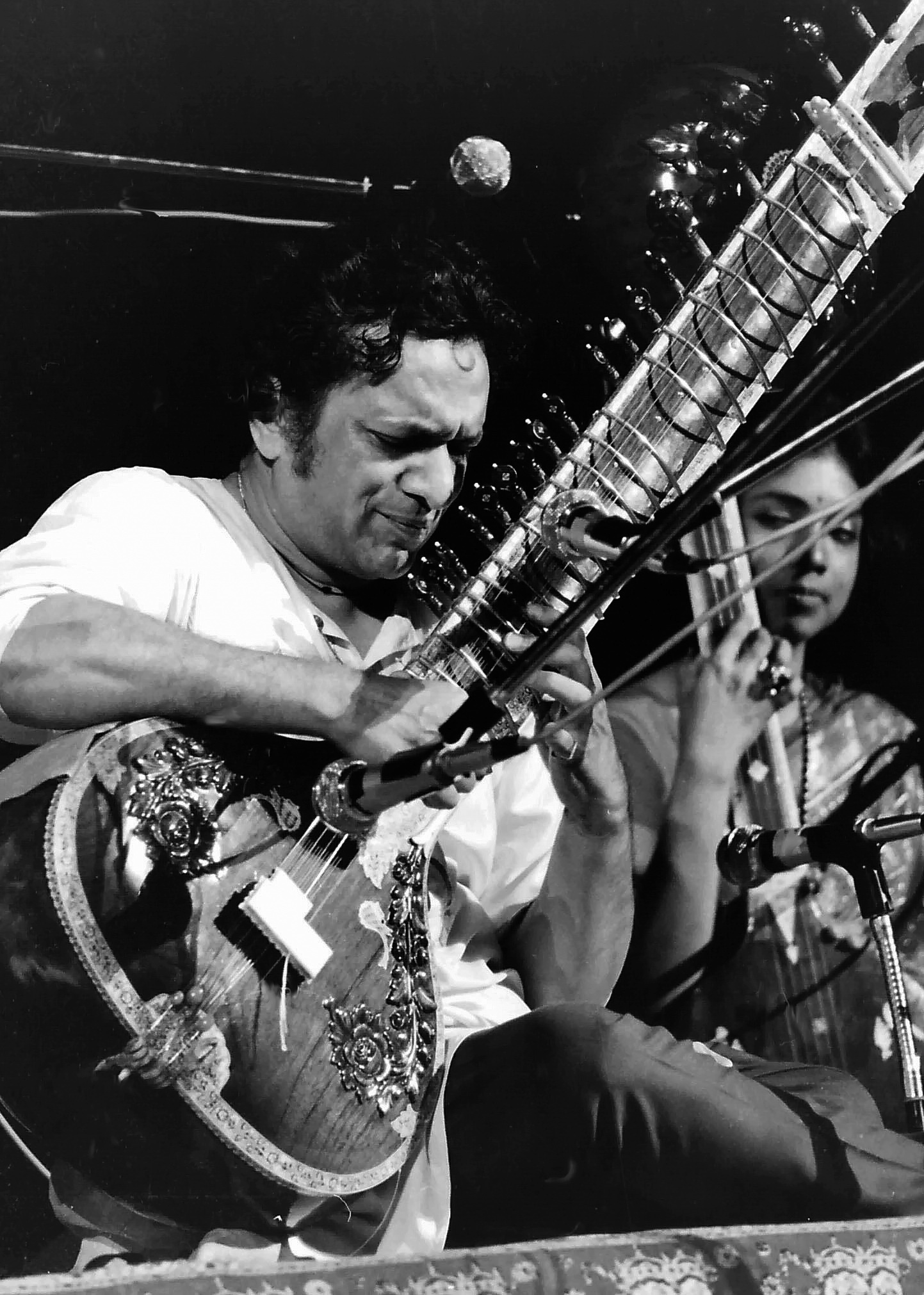
Ravi Shankar

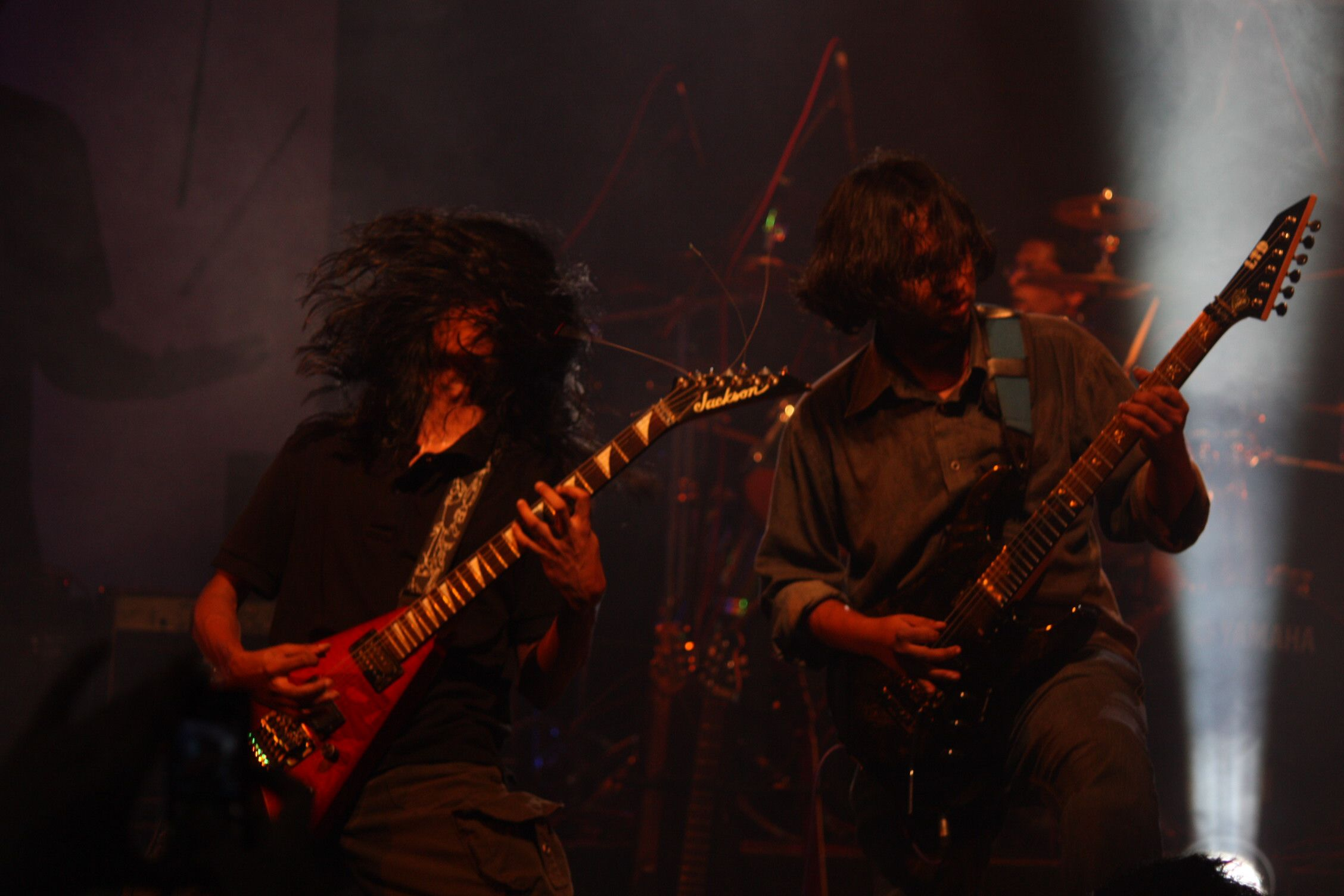
A Bangladeshi rock band

==== Theatre ====
Bengali theatre traces its roots to Indian classical drama under the Gupta Empire in the 4th century CE. It includes narrative forms, song and dance forms, supra-personae forms, performance with scroll paintings, puppet theatre and the processional forms like the Jatra.

==== Dance ====
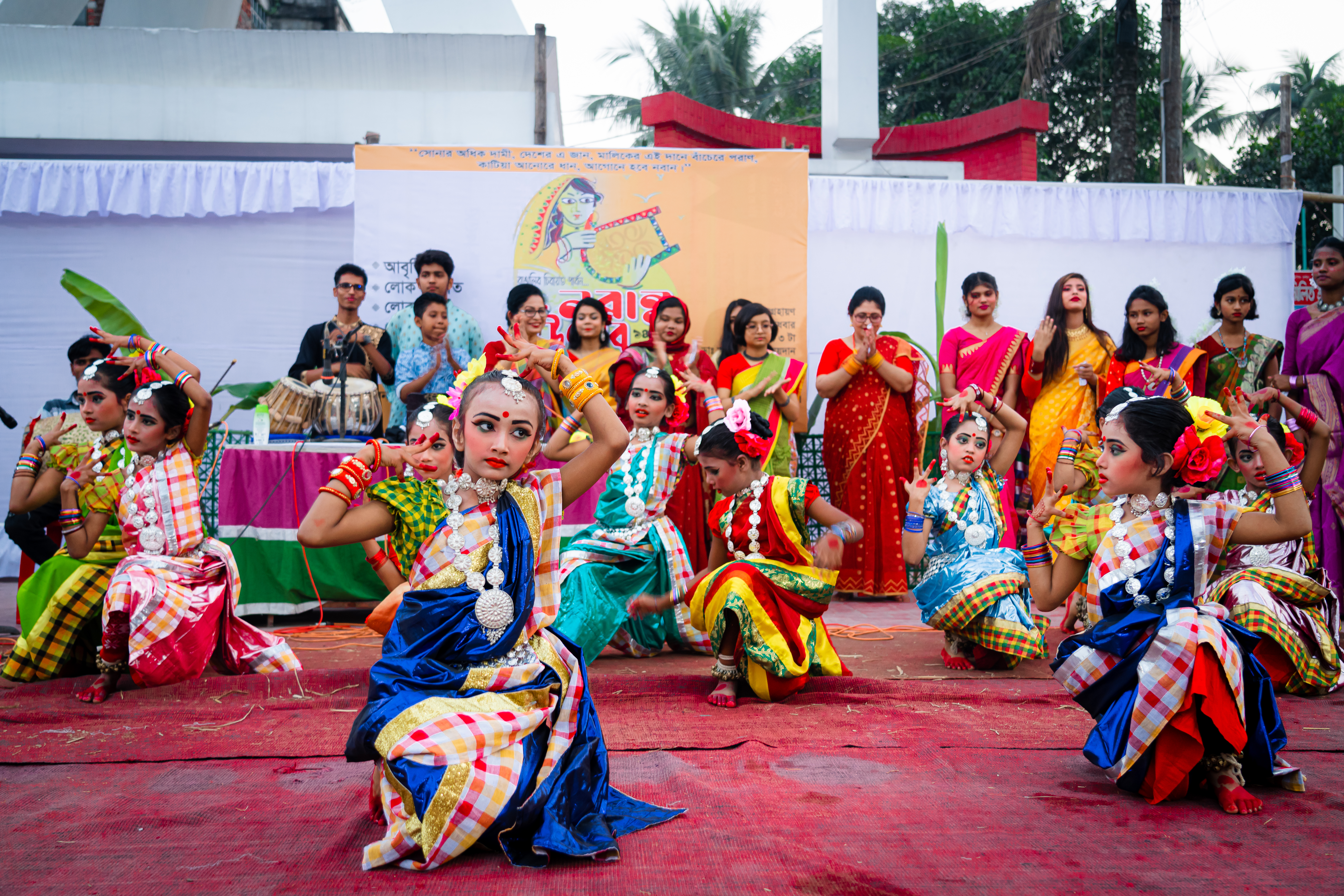
Bengali girls performing folk dance in the occasion of Nabanna

Bengal has an extremely rich heritage of dancing dating back to antiquity. It includes classical, folk and martial dance traditions. Dances in Bengal includes-

- Gaudiya Nritya (Classical dance)
- Rabindra Nritya
- Nazrul Nritya
- Dhunuchi Nritya
- Rajbongshi Nritya
- Baul dance
- Sankirtana of Nadia/Gaudiya Vaishnavism
- Chhau dance
- Jhumair dance
- Chhokra dance
- Fakir dance
- Dhamail dance
- Gombhira dance
- Raibenshe dance
- Chittagonian dance
- Alkap dance
- Jari dance
- Lathi dance
- Puppetry (Putul naach)

=== Visual arts ===
==== Painting ====
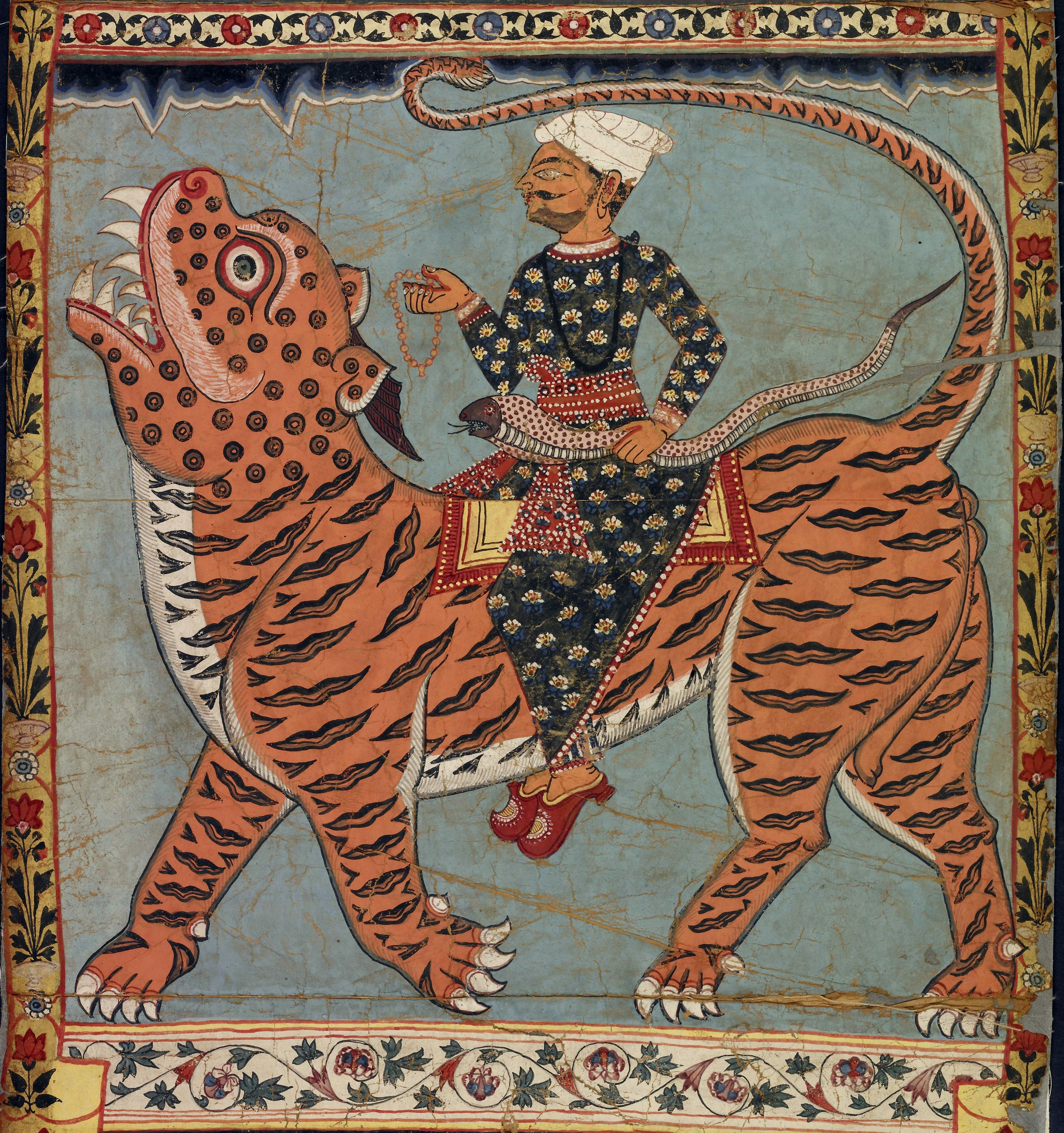
The Gazi scrolls (Gazir pat) narrate the story of Gazi Pir, who was thought to have lived in the Sundarbans some time between the 12th to 13th century.

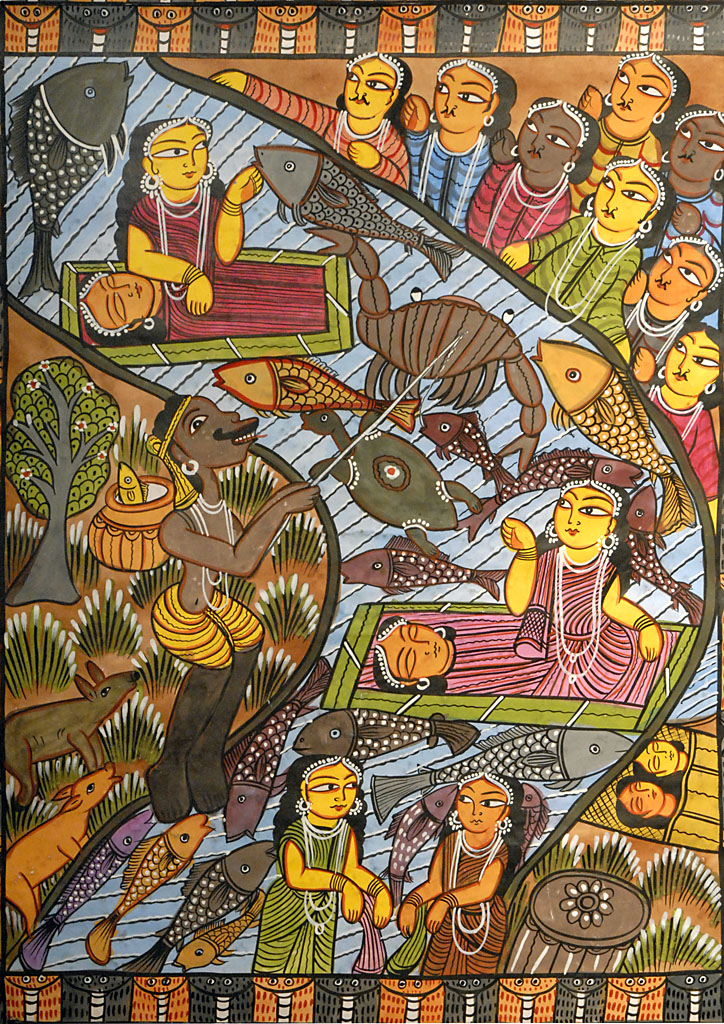
A Kalighat painting describing a scene from Manasamangal Kavya

Miniature and scroll painting flourished in Mughal Bengal. Rickshaw Painting adorns colorful hoods featuring intricate designs like minarets and floral patterns with the word "Allah" and other islamic motifs, are recognized as UNESCO-listed intangible heritage. The Patua community specializes "Patachitra", with the Gazir Pata being their renowned artwork, depicting Gazi Pir.

Kalighat painting or Kalighat Pat originated in 19th-century Calcutta, in the vicinity of Kalighat Kali Temple of Kolkata, and from being items of souvenir taken by the visitors to the Kali temple, the paintings over a period of time developed as a distinct school of Indian painting. From the depiction of Hindu gods other mythological characters, the Kalighat paintings developed to reflect a variety of themes.

Modern painting emerged in Calcutta with the Bengal school. East Pakistan developed its own contemporary painting tradition under Zainul Abedin. Modern Bangladeshi art has produced many of South Asia's leading painters, including SM Sultan, Mohammad Kibria, Shahabuddin Ahmed, Kanak Chanpa Chakma, Kafil Ahmed, Saifuddin Ahmed, Qayyum Chowdhury, Rashid Choudhury, Quamrul Hassan, Rafiqun Nabi and Syed Jahangir among others.

==== Architecture ====
The earliest fortified cities in the region include Wari-Bateshwar, Chandraketugarh and Mahasthangarh. Bengal has a glorious legacy of terracotta architecture from the ancient and medieval periods. The architecture of the Bengal Sultanate saw a distinct style of domed mosques with complex niche pillars that had no minarets. Ivory, pottery and brass were also widely used in Bengali art. The style includes many mosques, temples, palaces, forts, monasteries and caravanserais. Mughal Dhaka was known as the City of Mosques and the Venice of the East. Indo-Saracenic architecture flourished during the British period, particularly among the landed gentry. British Calcutta was known as the City of Palaces. Modernist terracotta architecture in South Asia by architects like Muzharul Islam and Louis Kahn.

Bengali village housing is noted as the origin of the bungalow.

==== Sculpture ====
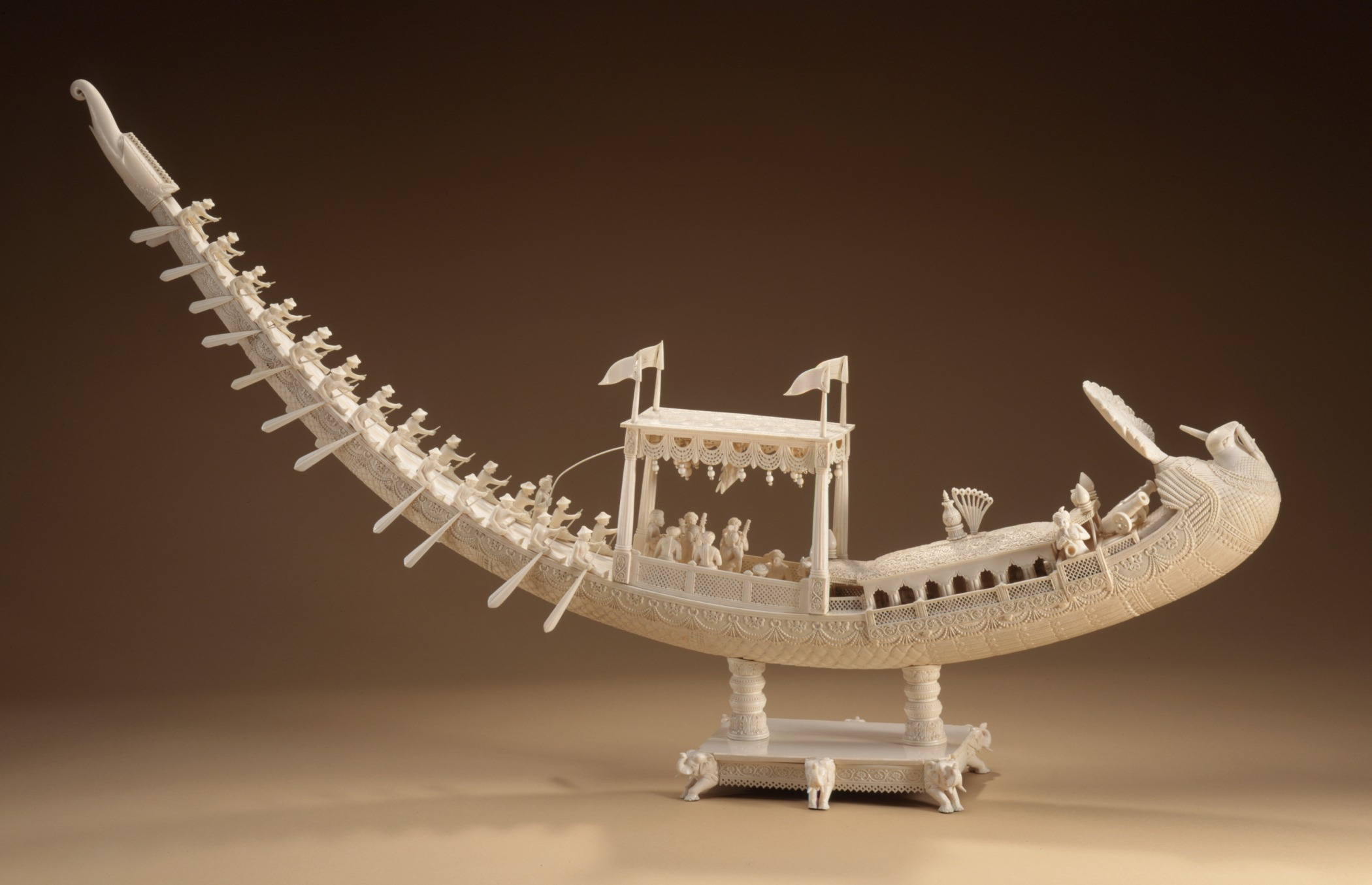
A sculpture of the Nawab of Bengal's Royal Peacock Barge in Murshidabad.

Ancient Bengal was home to the Pala-Sena school of sculptural art. Ivory sculptural art flourished across the region under the Nawabs of Bengal. Notable modernist sculptors include Novera Ahmed and Nitun Kundu.

== Lifestyle ==
=== Textiles ===
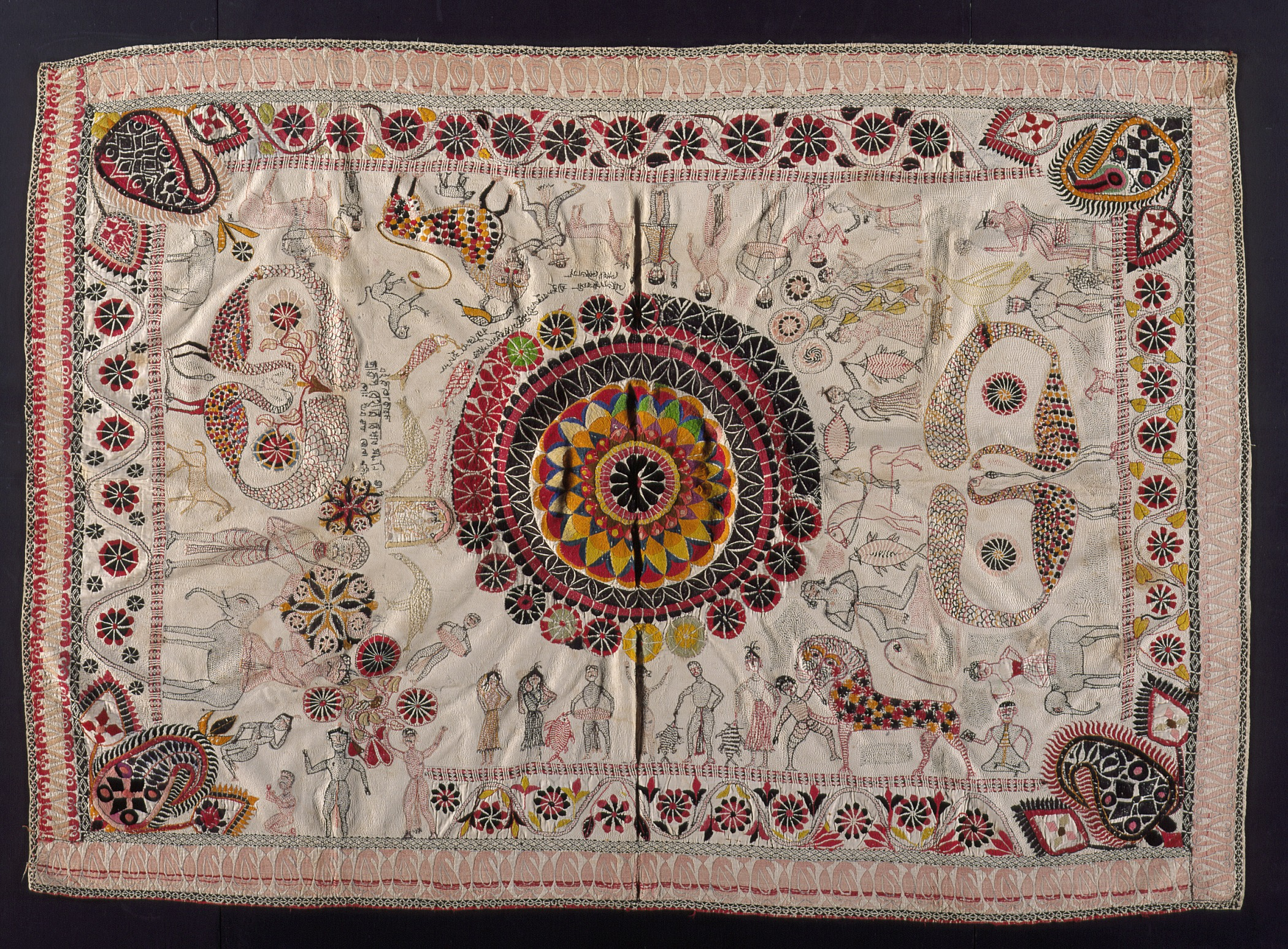
Kantha, a Bengali cotton textile

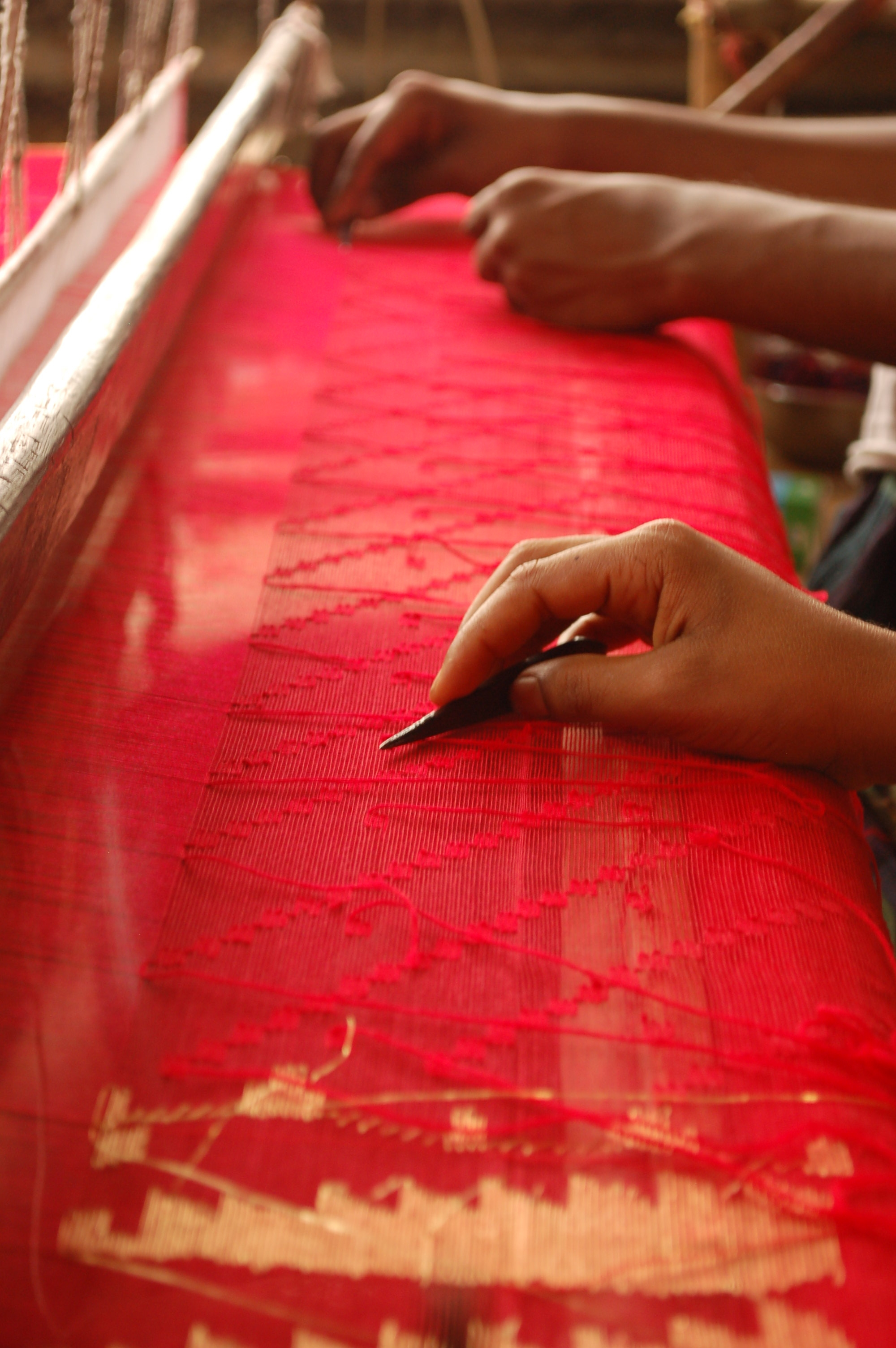
Traditional way of weaving Jamdani.

Muslin production in Bengal dates back to the 4th century BCE. The region exported the fabric to Ancient Greece and Rome.

Bengali silk was known as Ganges Silk in the 13th century Republic of Venice. Mughal Bengal was a major silk exporter. The Bengali silk industry declined after the growth of Japanese silk production. Rajshahi silk continues to be produced in northern Bangladesh. Murshidabad and Malda are the centers of the silk industry in West Bengal.

After the reopening of European trade with medieval India, Mughal Bengal became the world's foremost muslin exporter in the 17th century. Mughal-era Dhaka was a center of the worldwide muslin trade.

Mughal Bengal's most celebrated artistic tradition was the weaving of Jamdani motifs on fine muslin, which is now classified by UNESCO as an intangible cultural heritage. Jamdani motifs were similar to Iranian textile art (buta motifs) and Western textile art (paisley). The Jamdani weavers in Dhaka received imperial patronage.

Modern Bangladesh is one of the world's largest textile producers, with a large cotton based ready made garments industry.

=== Clothing ===
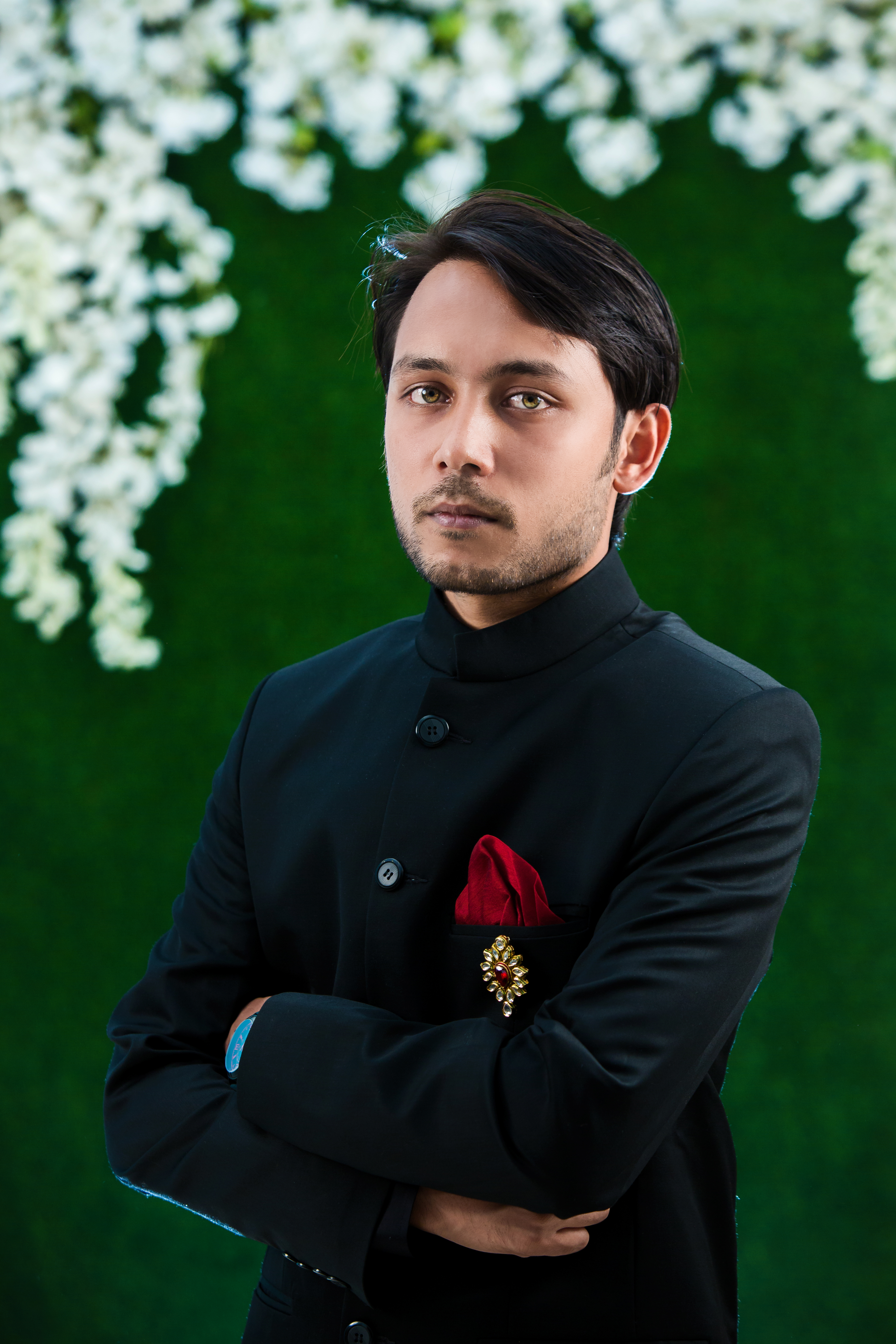
A Bengali Muslim man sporting a simple black sherwani.

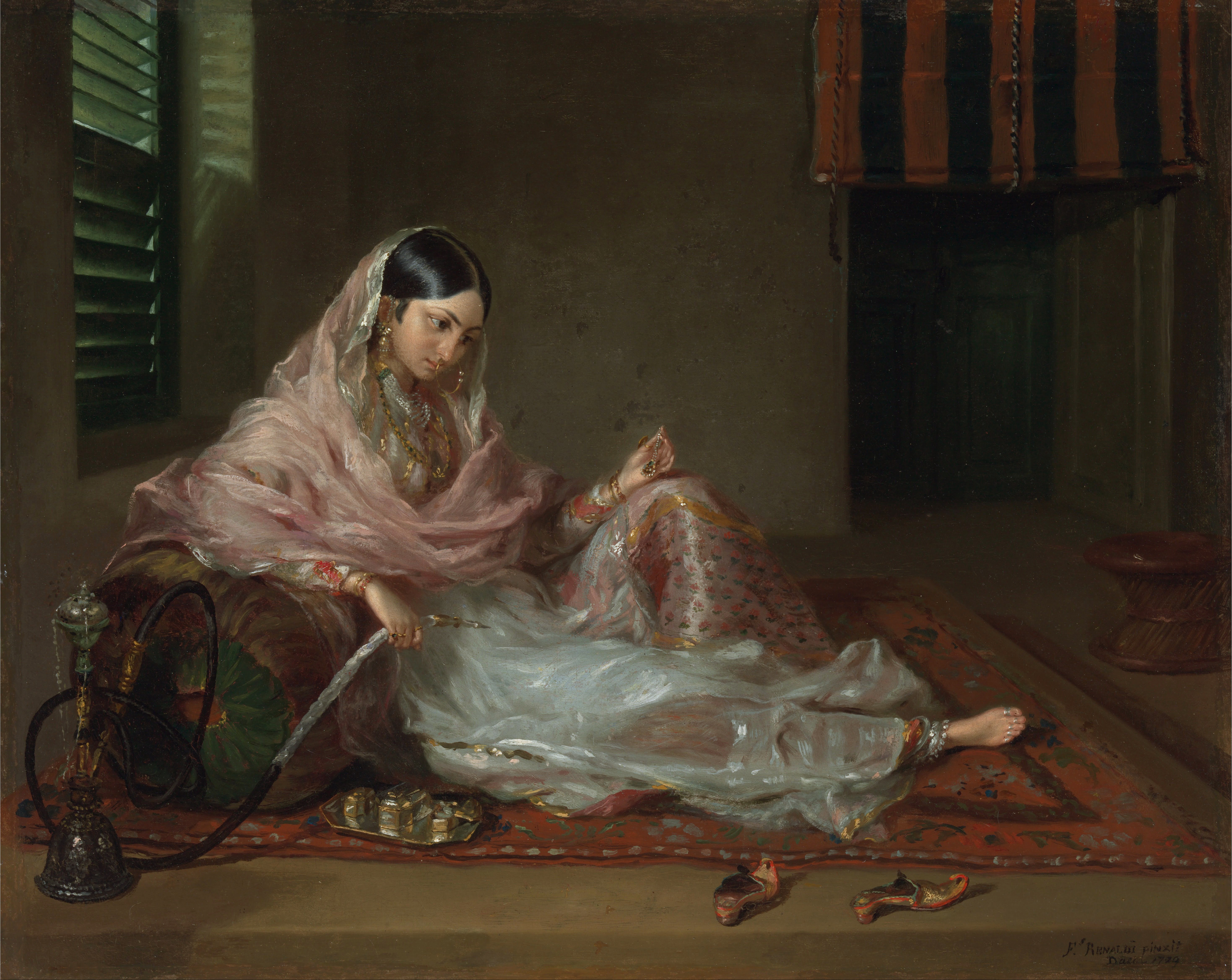
A Bengali woman in Dhaka clad in fine Bengali muslin, 18th century.

In rural areas, older women wear the shari with hijab while the younger generation wear the selwar kamiz with hijab, both with simple designs. In urban areas, the selwar kamiz and the combination of niqab-burqa-chador is more popular, and has distinct fashionable designs. Islamic clothing is really common among Bengali Muslims. World Hijab Day is an annual event founded by a Bengali-American, Nazma Khan in 2013, taking place on 1 February each year. Traditionally urban Bengali men wore the jama, though costumes such as the panjabi with selwar or pyjama have become more popular within the past three centuries. The popularity of the fotua, a shorter upper garment, is undeniable among Bengalis in casual environments. The lungi and gamcha are a common combination for rural Bengali men. During special occasions, Bengali women commonly wear either sharis, selwar kamizes, covering their hair with hijab or orna; and men wear a panjabi, also covering their hair with a tupi, toqi, pagri or rumal.

Jama is the long, loose fitting, stitched garment of Bengali Women. Jama was originally worn by Bengali Women in the Mughal court as a symbol of status and wealth. Over time, it has now been more widely adopted by women in other parts of Bengal, including Bangladesh. Jama may also fulfill some interpretations of Islamic rules. Jama is similar to dress.

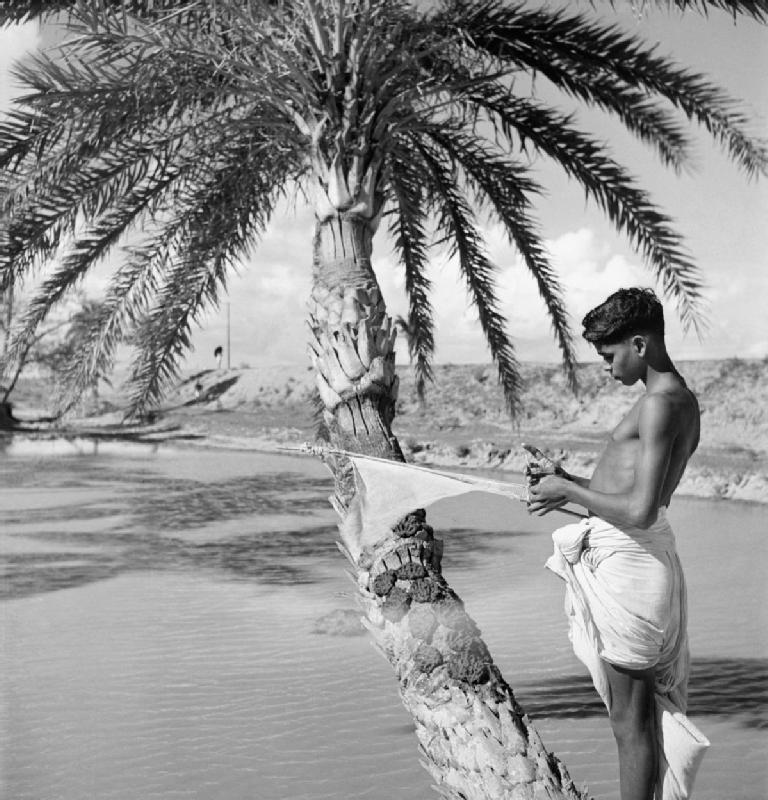
A Bengali men in dhoti, between 1939 and 1945.

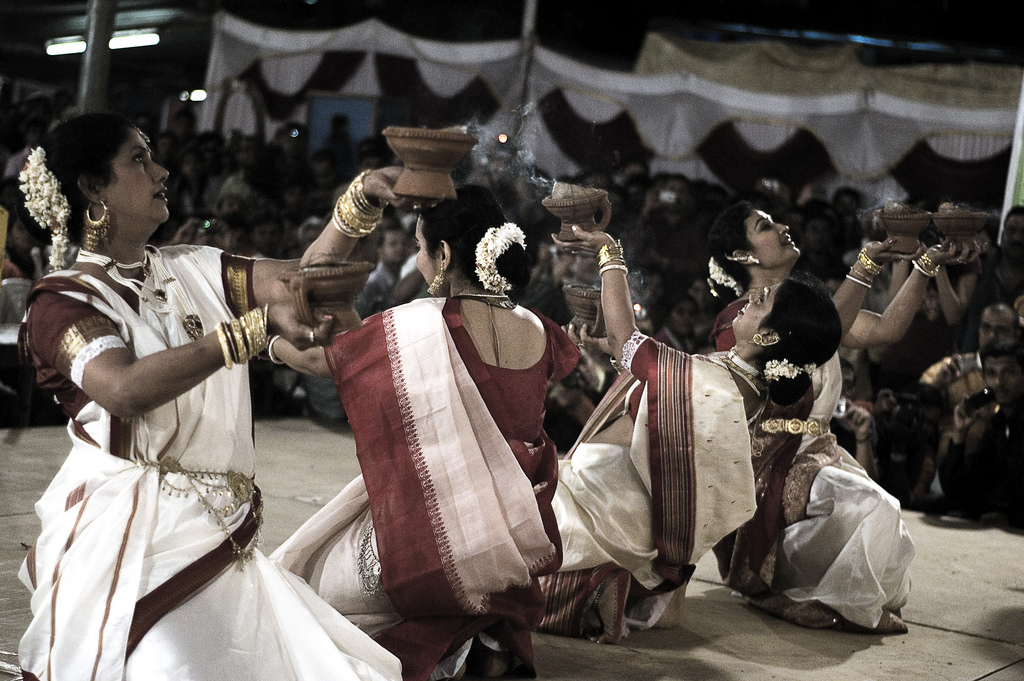
Bengali Hindu woman wearing traditional garad saree during the Dhunuchi Nritya.

At Jorashanko (Rabindranath Tagore's home in Kolkata) different drapes of sari were improvised on so that women could step out of the andarmahal (inner house) where they were relegated. This had Tagore's sister-in-law, Jnanadanandini Devi, bringing the Parsi way of draping the sari from Mumbai to Bengal. Chitra Deb, in her book 'Thakurbarir Andarmahal', describes the entire process of how the Parsi sari was adapted into Bengali culture. Before Devi's invention, Bengali women used to wear sari without a blouse underneath and stay in "Andarmahal" to follow "purdah", a concept of modesty bought by Bengali Muslims and was followed by both Hindus and Muslims. Dhakai is another attire of women unique to Bengal. There are several variations of Shari (Bengali Sari) such as Jamdani, Baluchari, Korial Saree, Garad sari, Tant, Muslin, Tangail, Kantha, Murshidabadi Silk, Rajshahi Silk, Dhakai reshom, Malda Silk etc. Bengali women also wear Fotua, Bengali Kurti which are also unique to Bangladesh and Lal pad sada Korial saree which is unique to West Bengal. Men wear Gamucha, Lungi, Mujib Coat, Sherwani, Genji and Kaabli which are unique to the men of Bangladesh and Nehru jacket, Dhoti, Panjabi, Uttariya, Topor, Chadar which are unique to men of West Bengal.

Bengal has produced several of South Asia's leading fashion designers, including Sabyasachi Mukherjee, Anamika Khanna, Agnimitra Paul, Bibi Russell, Rukhsana Esrar Runi and Rina Latif. Sabyasachi is the leading wedding brand of South Asia.

=== Cuisine ===
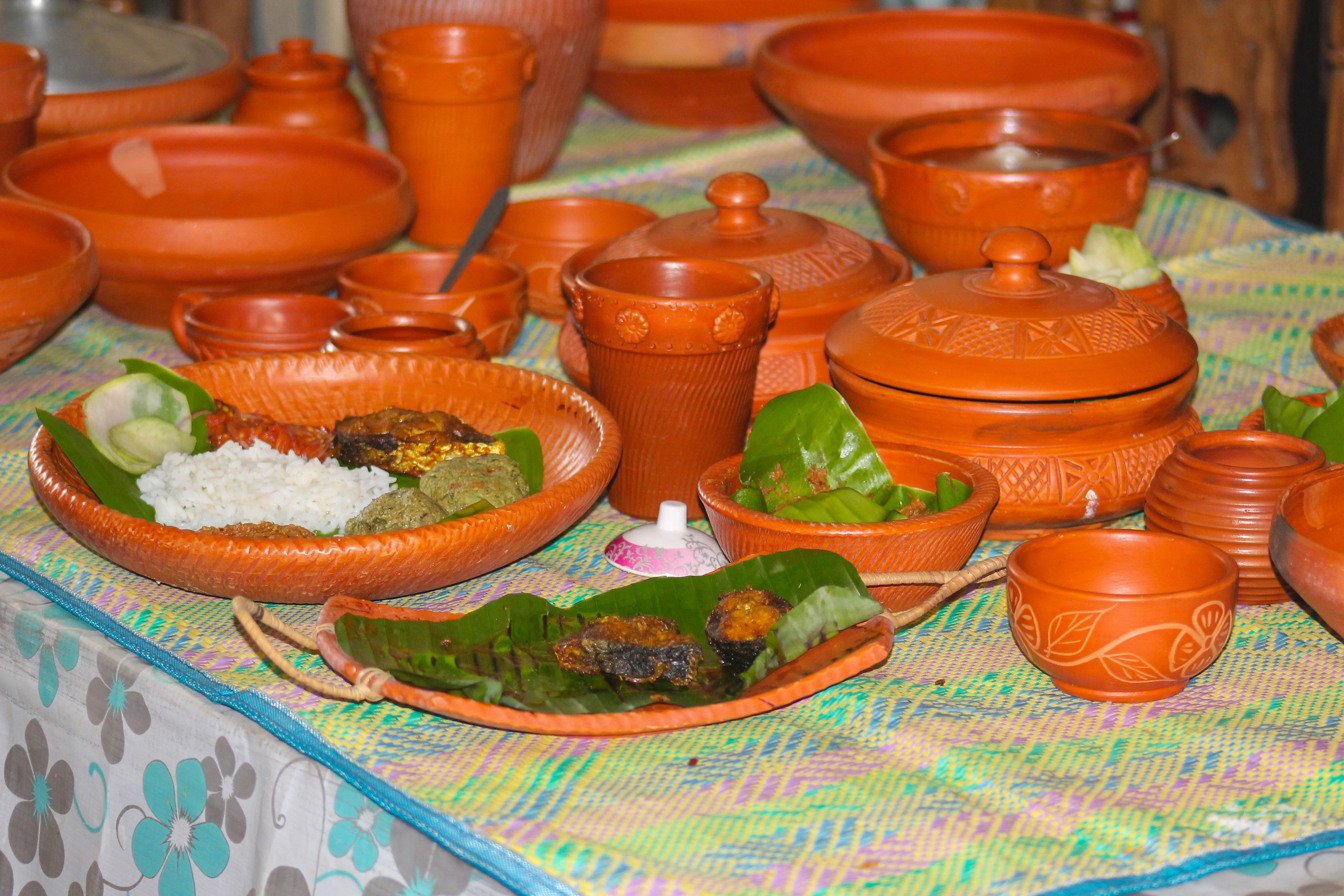
A very traditional meal of Bengal

Rice is the staple food of Bengal. Bhortas (lit-"mashed") are a really common type of food used as an additive too rice. there are several types of Bhortas such as Ilish bhorta shutki bhorta, begoon bhorta and more. Fish and other seafood are also important because Bengal is a reverrine region.

Some fishes like puti (Puntius species) are fermented. Fish curry is prepared with fish alone or in combination with vegetables.Shutki maach is made using the age-old method of preservation where the food item is dried in the sun and air, thus removing the water content. This allows for preservation that can make the fish last for months, even years in Bangladesh.

Bengali pickles are an integral part of Bengali cuisine, adding a burst of flavors to meals. These pickles are made by preserving various fruits, vegetables, and even fish or meat in a mixture of spices, oil, and vinegar or lemon juice, which is why pickles of Bangladesh are unique to the country.

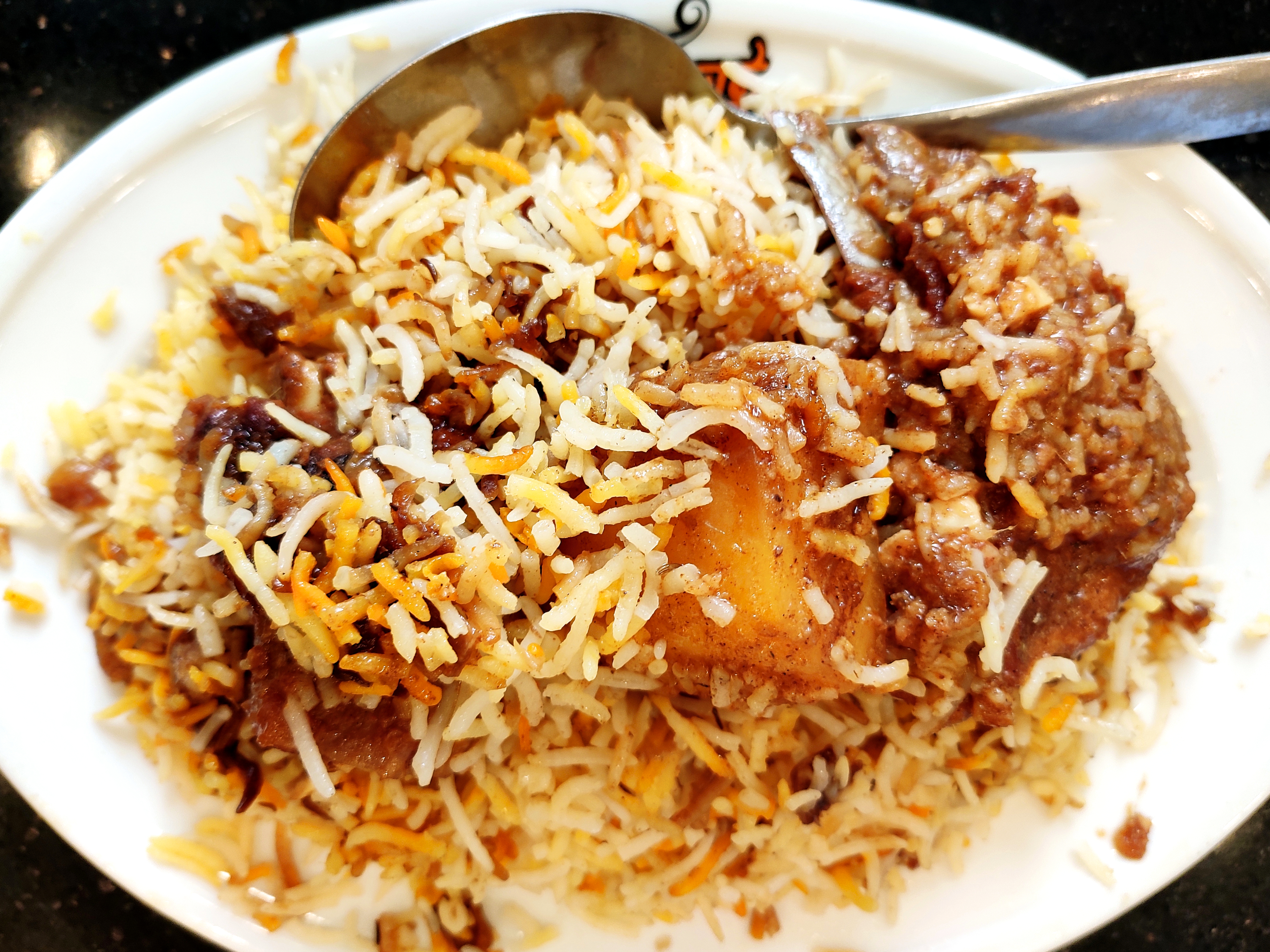
Kacchi Biryani, one of the most famous food in Bengali culture

Side Dishes or (Torkari) are commonly eaten with meals in Bengal which are cooked with special Bengali spices. The main dish is almost always served with side dishes. Some typical Bengali dishes are Shorshe Ilish, Machher Jhol, Kala bhuna, Shutki Shira, Bhorta, Chingri Malaikari, Daab Chingri, Katlar kaliya, Dal, Padar jhal, Ilish Pulao, Chingri Pulao, Rui Pulao, Haji biryani, etc. Bengali sweets like Chomchom, Rasmalai, Mishti Doi, Curd of Bogra, Muktagachhar monda, Sandesh, Roshogolla, Chhanamukhi and Pithas are even popular outside of Bangladesh. Shemai originally came from the Bengali Muslim community, but most other Bengali sweets were invented by Hindu and Jain sweetmakers of Bengal.

Shutki maach is made using the age-old method of preservation where the food item is dried in the sun and air, thus removing the water content. This allows for preservation that can make the fish last for months, even years in Bangladesh.

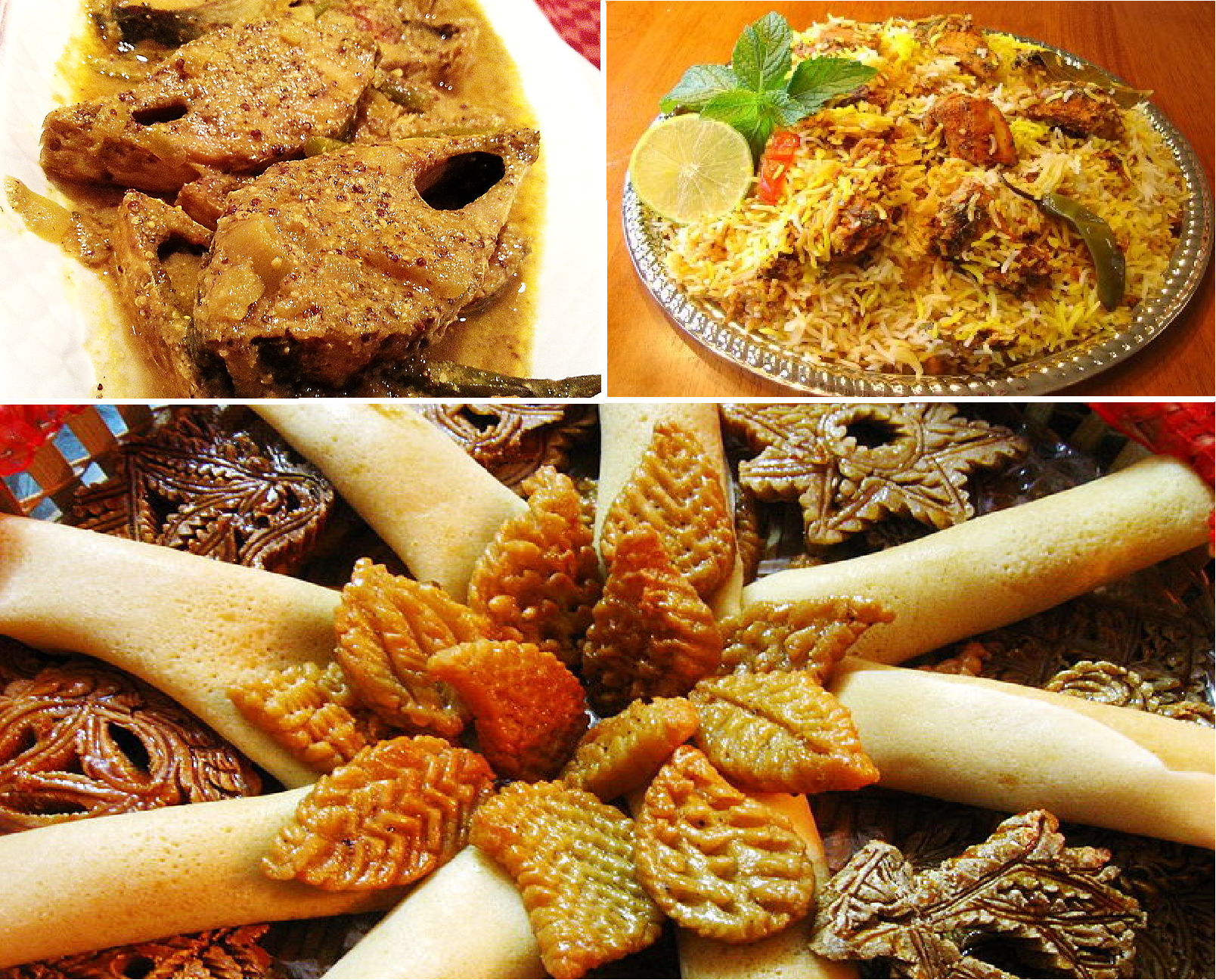
Montage of Bengal's culinary delights Shorshe Ilish (top left), Biryani of Dhaka (top right), Pitha (bottom)

=== Transport ===
Kolkata is the only city in India to have a tram network. The trams are claimed to slow down other traffic, leading to groups who currently voice abolishing the trams, though the environment-friendliness and the old charm of the trams attract many people.

Kolkata was also the first city in South Asia to have an underground railway system that started operating from 1984. It is considered to have the status of a zonal railway. The metered-cabs are mostly of the brand "Ambassador" manufactured by Hindustan Motors (now out of production). These taxis are painted with yellow colour, symbolising the transport tradition of Kolkata.

Bangladesh has the world's largest number of cycle rickshaws. Its capital city Dhaka is known as the Rickshaw Capital of the World. The country's rickshaws display colorful rickshaw art, with each city and region have their own distinct style. Rickshaw driving provides employment for nearly a million Bangladeshis. Historically, Kolkata has been home to the hand-pulled rickshaw. Attempts to ban its use have largely failed.

There are 150 different types of boats and canoes in Bengal. The region was renowned for shipbuilding in the medieval period, when its shipyards catered to major powers in Eurasia, including the Mughals and Ottomans. The types of timber used in boat making are from local woods Jarul (dipterocarpus turbinatus), sal (shorea robusta), sundari (heritiera fomes) and Burma teak (tectons grandis).

=== Weddings ===
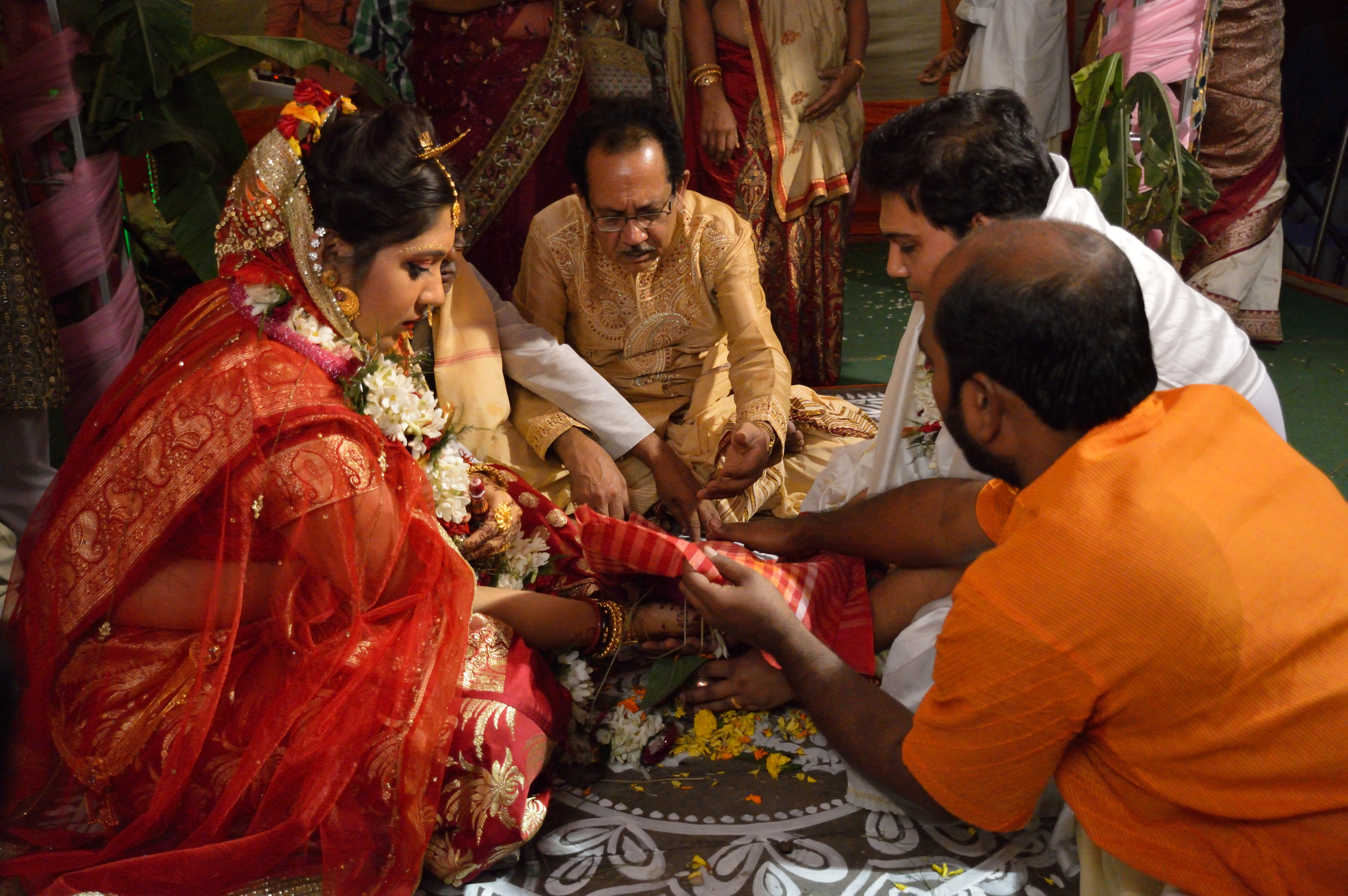
Bengali Hindu bride and groom

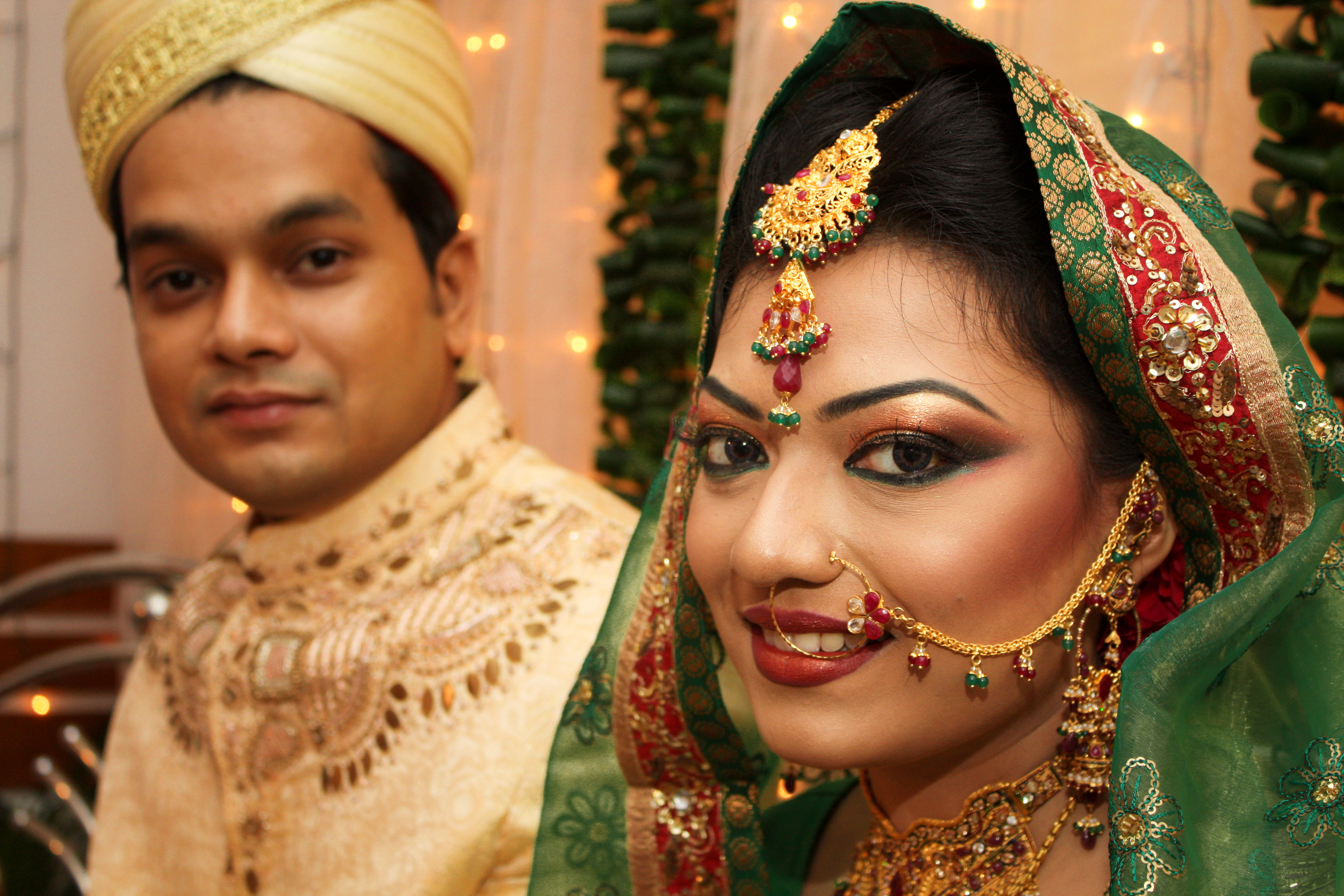
Bengali Muslim wedding

Bengali weddings includes many rituals and ceremonies that can span several days. Although Muslim and Hindu marriages have their distinctive religious rituals, there are many common secular rituals. The Gaye Holud ceremony is held in Bengali weddings of all faiths.

== Cultural institutions, organisations and events ==
Major organisations responsible for funding and promoting Bengali culture are:

- National Art Gallery (Bangladesh)
- Shilpakala Academy
- Bangladesh Folk Arts and Crafts Foundation
- Ministry of Cultural Affairs (Bangladesh) (Republic of Bangladesh)
- Ministry of Culture (India) (Republic of India)
- Ministry of Information & Cultural Affairs (West Bengal) (State of West Bengal)

List of institutions and organisations

- Chhayanaut
- Bulbul Lalitakala Academy
- Nazrul Institute
- Samdani Art Foundation
- Bangladesh Shishu Academy
- Bangladesh Short Film Forum
- Bishwo Shahitto Kendro
- Bangladeshi Photographers
- Bangladesh National Philatelic Association
- Bangla Academy
- Moviyana Film Society
- Theatre Institute Chattagram
- Bangladesh Film Development Corporation
- Bangladesh Film Archive
- Biswa Bangla
- Paschimbanga Bangla Akademi
- Paschim Banga Natya Akademi
- Bangiya Sahitya Parishad

Festivals

Both Bangladesh and West Bengal have many festivals and fairs throughout the year.

Muslim	Hindu	Buddhist	Christian	Seasonal
Eid al-Fitr	Durga Puja ; Wearing colour:	Buddha Purnima	Christmas	Pohela Boishakh (Bengali new Year)
Eid al-Adha	Saraswati Puja ; Wearing colour:	Madhu Purnima	Easter	Basanta Utsav (Spring colour Festival); Wearing colour:
Muharram; Wearing colour:	Kali Puja	Kathin Chibardan		Barsha Mangal (Monsoon salutation); Wearing colour:
Milad un Nabi; Wearing colour:	Lakshmi Puja			Nabanna (Harvest Festival); Wearing colour:
Shab-e-Barat	Dolyatra (Holi)			Poush Sangkranti (Winter Festival)
Laylat al-Qadr	Janmashtami			Pohela Falgun (Bangladesh spring festival)
Chaand Raat	Jagaddhatri Puja			

Events

- Ekushey Book Fair
- Bishwa Ijtema
- Ganga Sagar Mela
- Rath Yatra
- Ramadan
- International Mother Language Day
- Kolkata Film Festival
- Dhaka Art Summit
- Kolkata Book Fair
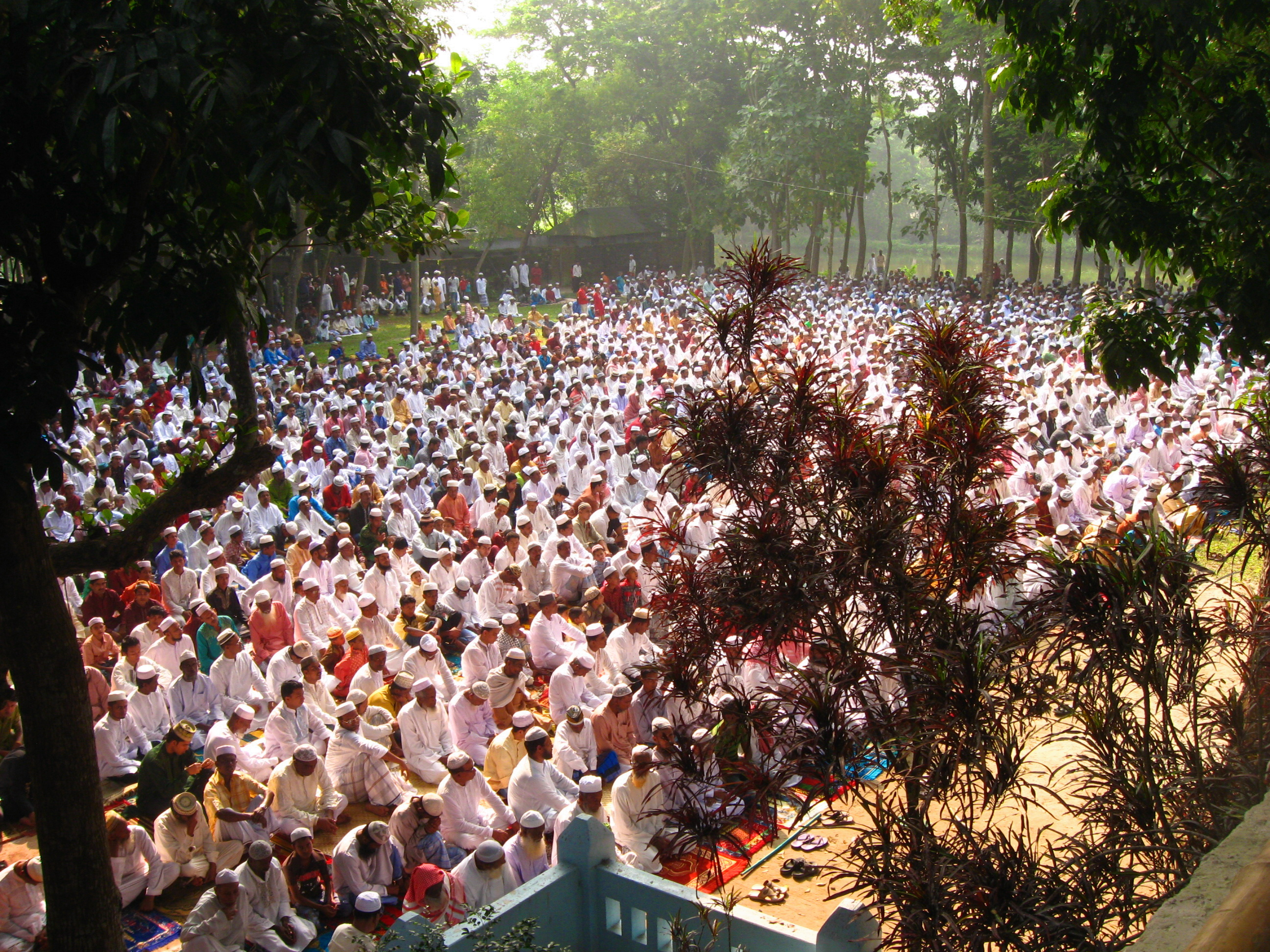
Congregation of Eid in Comilla

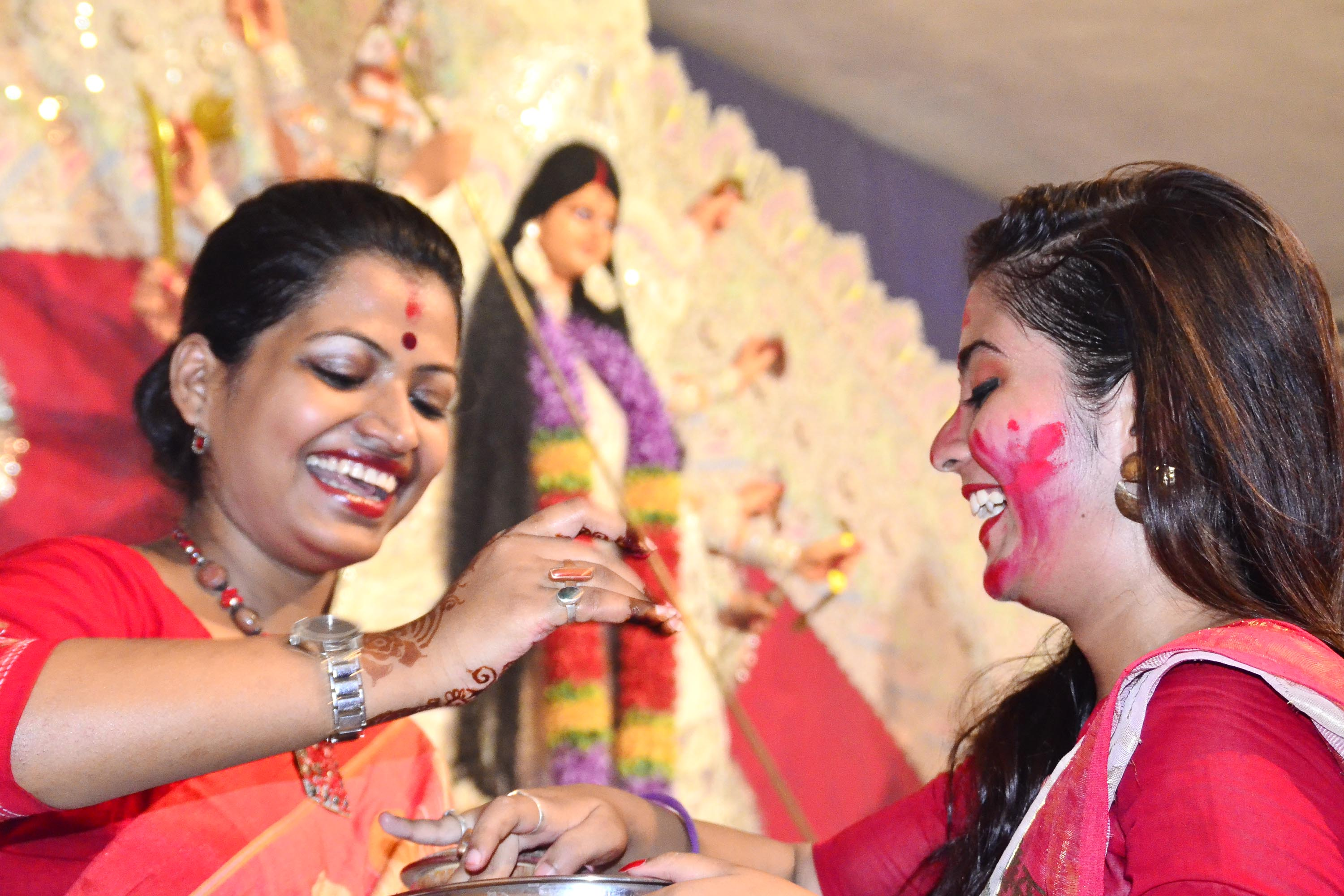
Shindur khela in Durga Puja at Kolkata

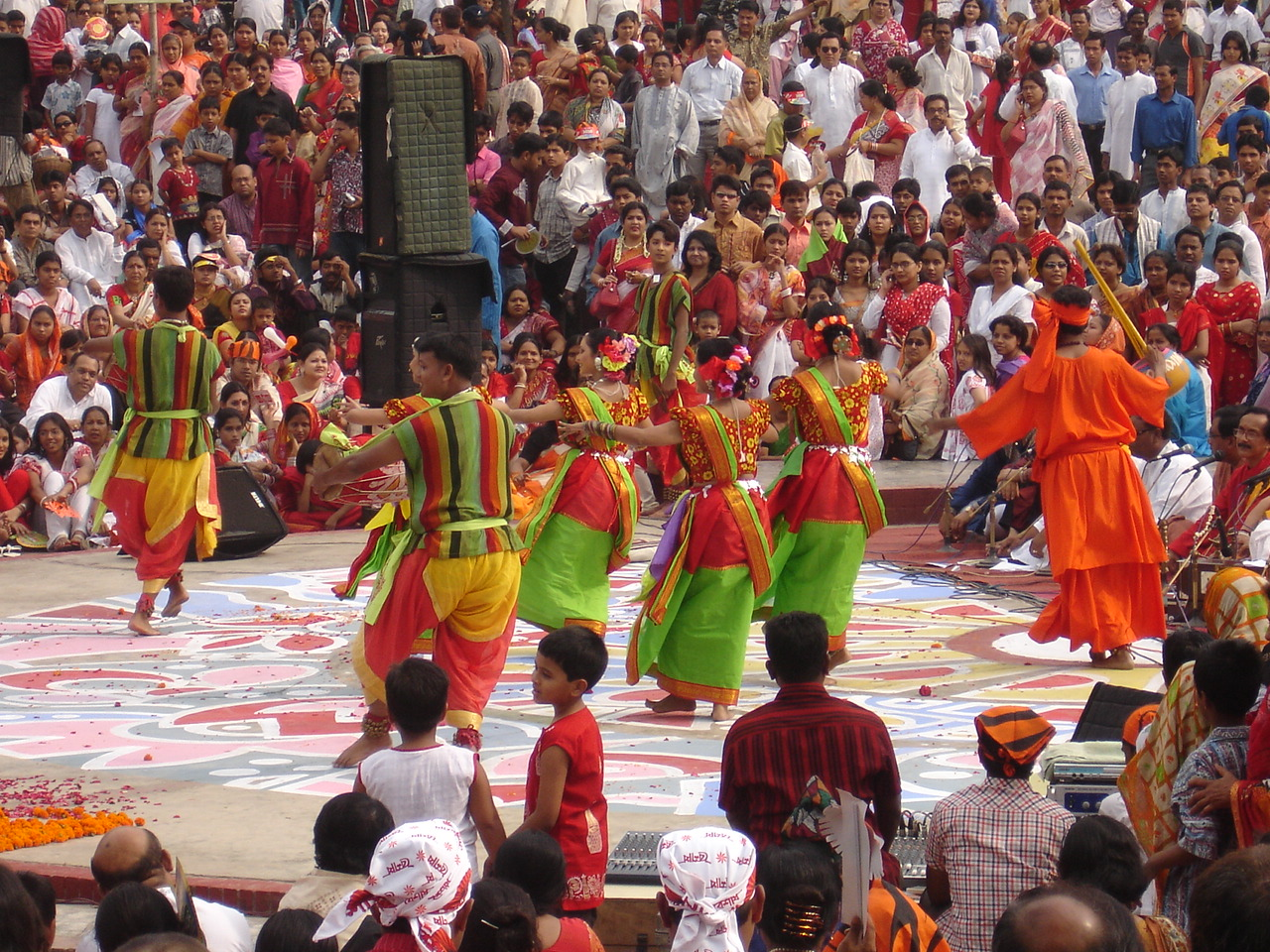
Celebration of Pohela Boishakh in Dhaka

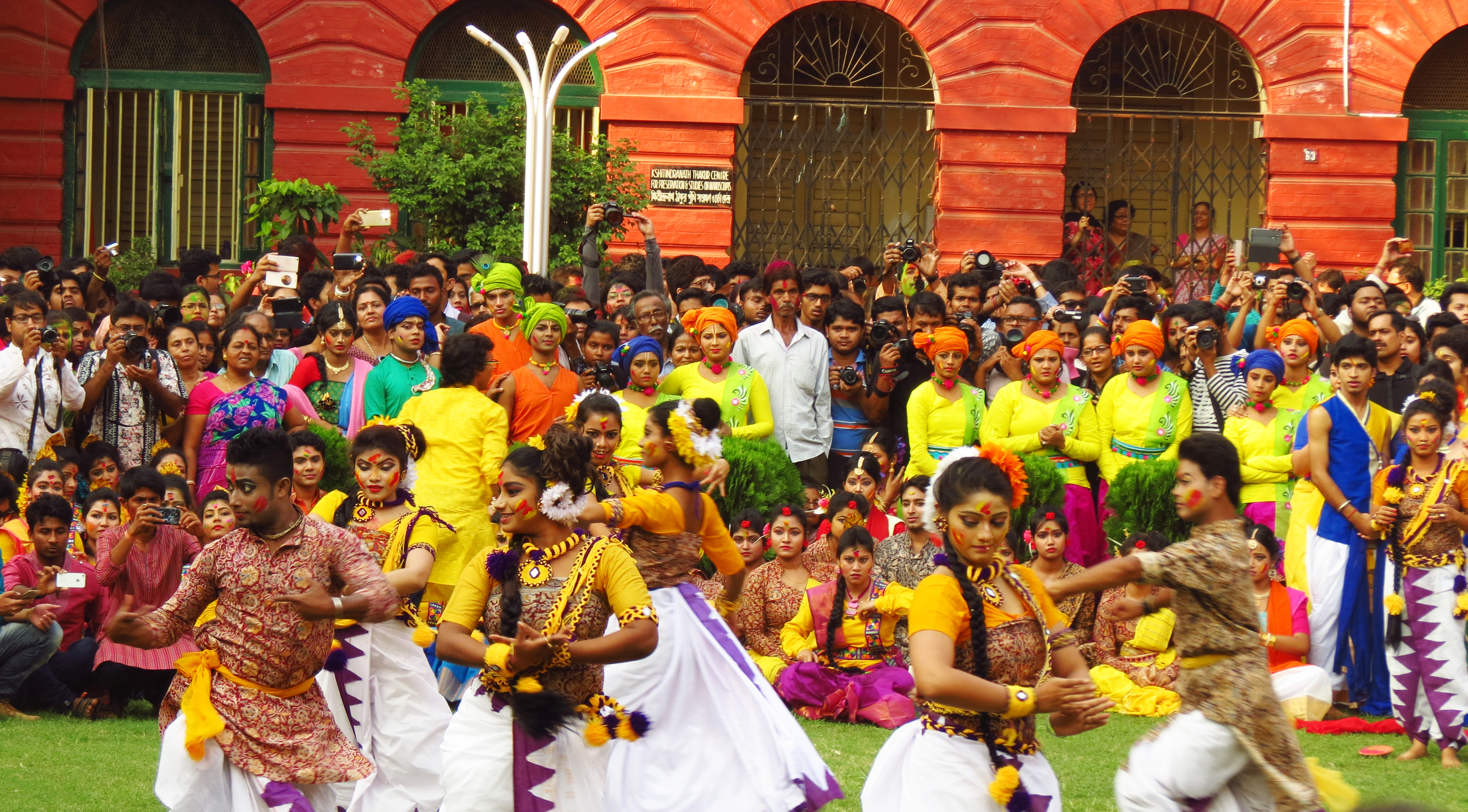
Basanta Utsav of Shantiniketan

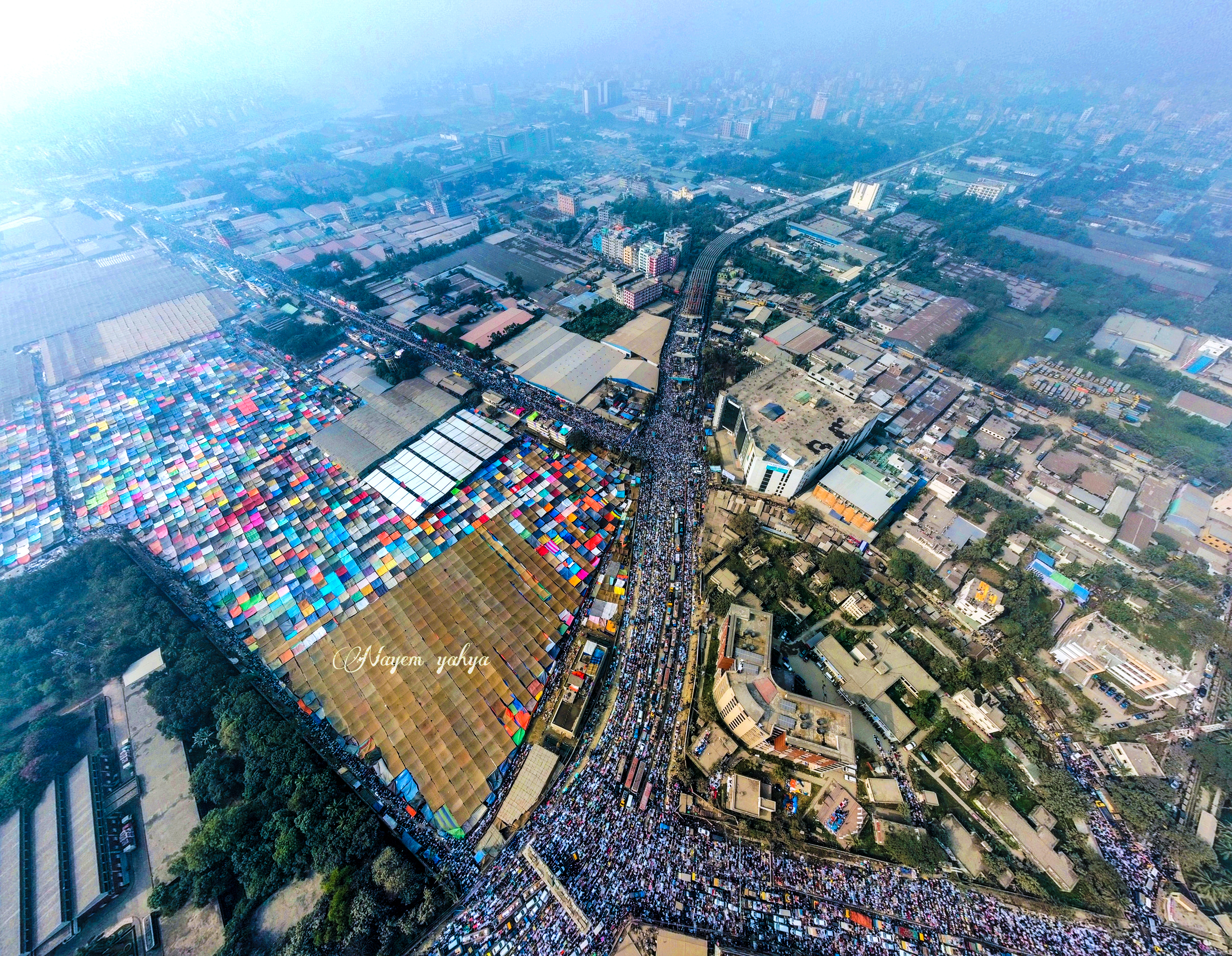
Bishwa Ijtema, one of the world's largest congregations

== Pastimes ==
=== Cinema ===
Kolkata and Dhaka are the centers of Bengali cinema. The region's film industry is notable for the history of art films in South Asia, including the works of Oscars winning director Satyajit Ray and the Cannes Film Festival award-winning director Tareque Masud.

=== Sports ===
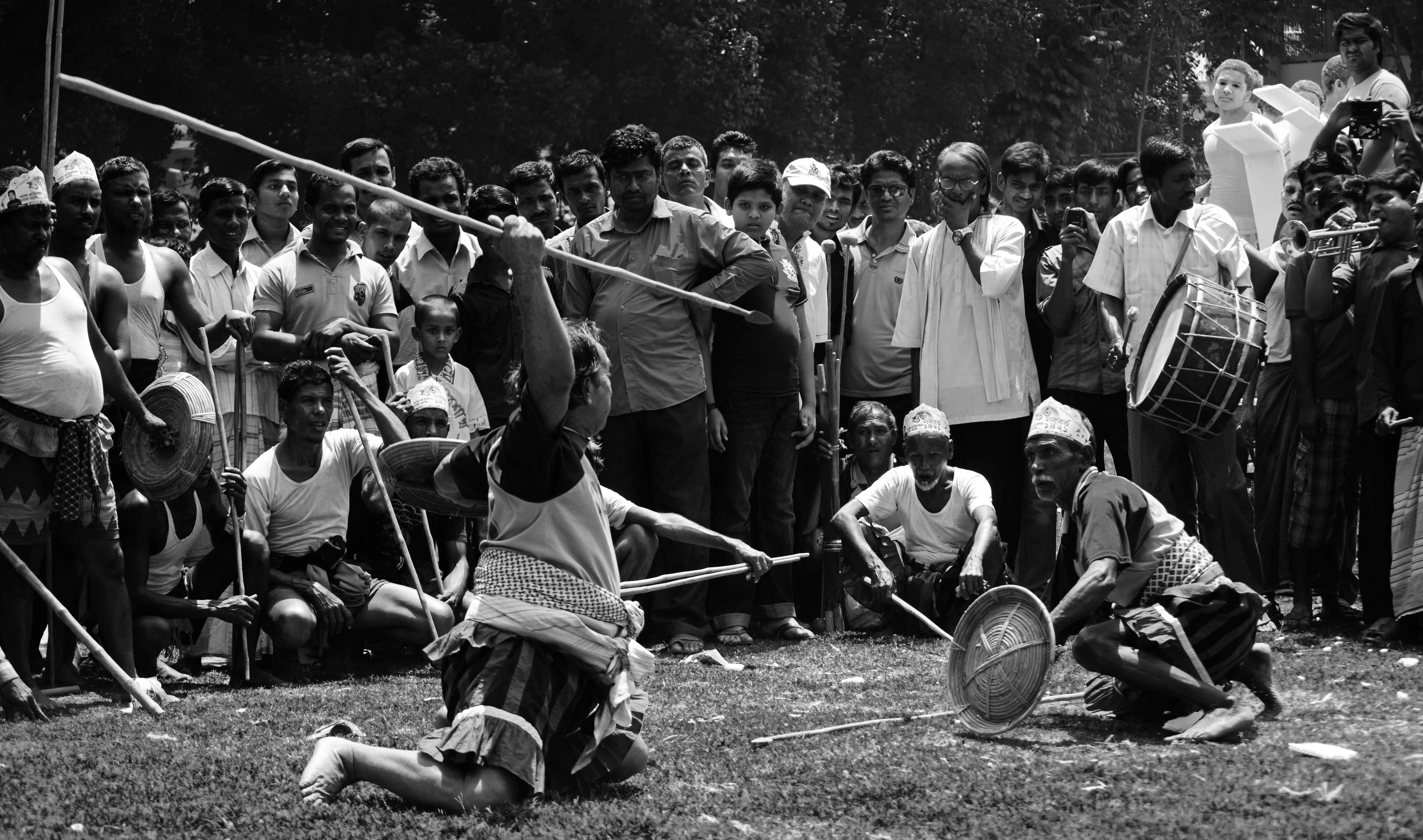
A lathi khela event taking place in Tangail.

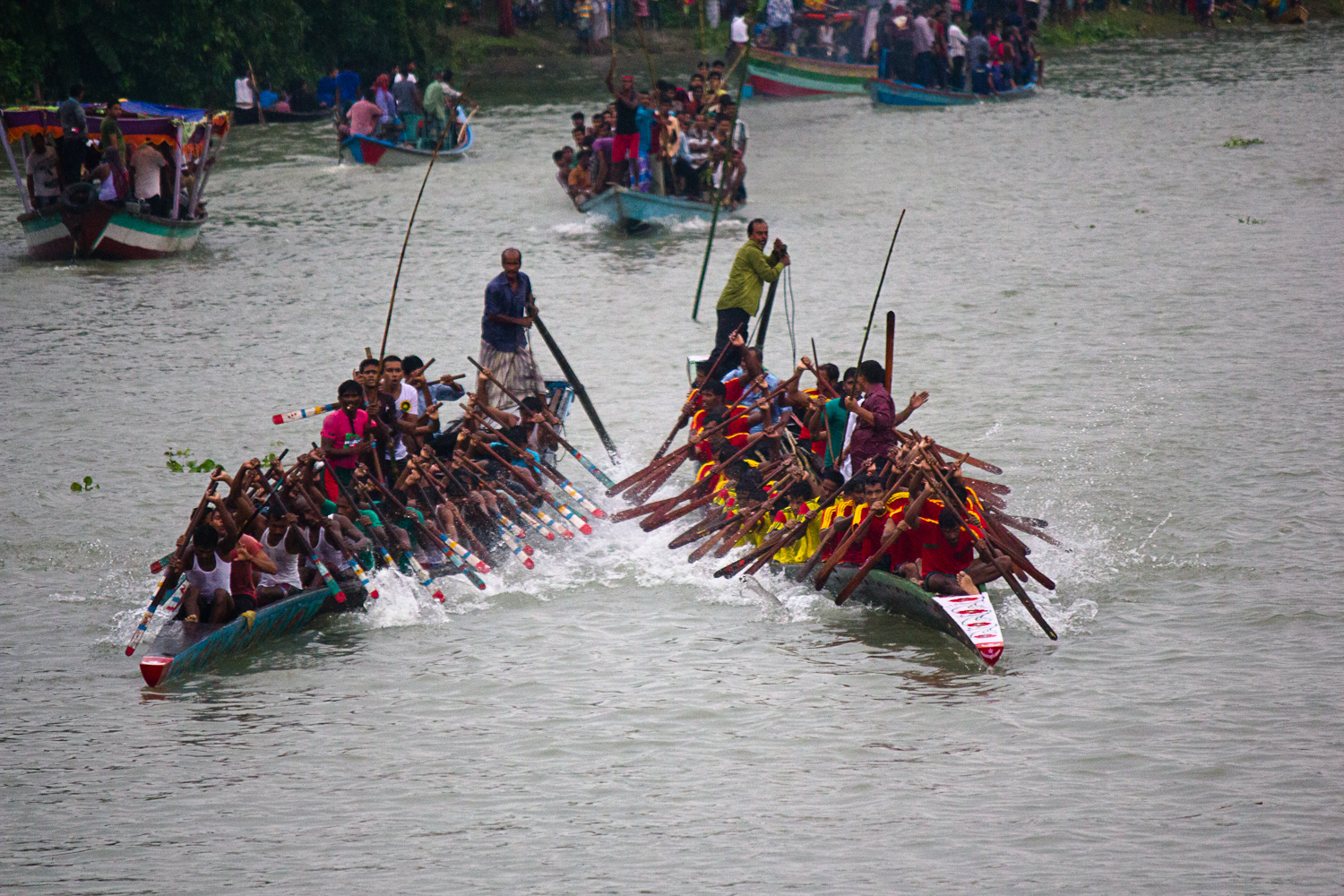
A Nouka Baich competition taking place in the monsoon season.

Traditional Bengali sports consisted of various martial arts and various racing sports, though the British-introduced sports of cricket and football are now most popular amongst Bengalis.

Lathi khela (stick-fighting) was historically a method of duelling as a way to protect or take land and others' possessions. The Zamindars of Bengal would hire lathials (trained stick-fighters) as a form of security and a means to forcefully collect tax from tenants. Nationwide lathi khela competitions used to take place annually in Kushtia up until 1989, though its practice is now diminishing and being restricted to certain festivals and celebrations. Chamdi is a variant of lathi khela popular in North Bengal during festivities such as Eid and Shab e Barat. Kushti (wrestling) is also another popular fighting sport and it has developed regional forms such as Jobbarer boli khela (wrestling of Jobbar/the great) and Mokkar Boli Khela (wrestling of Mecca) which was introduced in 1889 by Zamindar Qadir Bakhsh of Chittagong. A merchant known as Abdul Jabbar Saodagar adapted the sport in 1907 with the intention of cultivating a sport that would prepare Bengalis in fighting against British colonials. In 1972, a popular contact team sport called Kabadi was made the national sport of Bangladesh. It is a regulated version of the rural Hadudu sport which had no fixed rules. The Amateur Kabaddi Federation of Bangladesh was formed in 1973. Butthan, a 20th-century Bengali martial arts invented by Grandmaster Mak Yuree, is now practiced in different parts of the world under the International Butthan Federation.

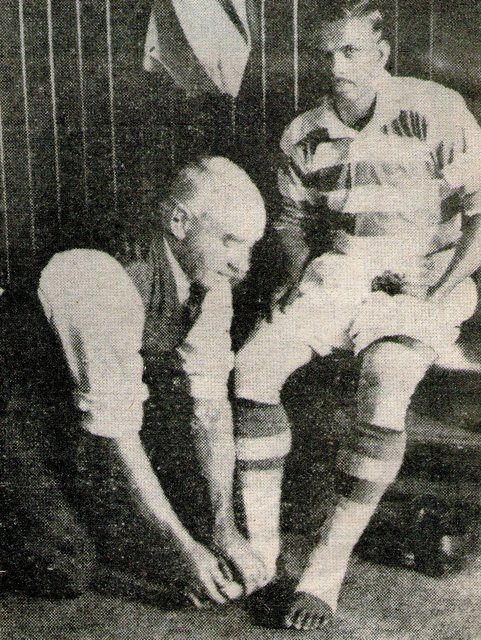
Mohammed Salim, the first South Asian footballer to play for a foreign club. Due to playing in bare feet, he is having them bandaged by Jimmy McMenemy in 1936.

The Nouka Baich is a Bengali boat racing competition which takes place during and after the rainy season when much of the land goes under water. The long canoes were referred to as khel nao (meaning playing boats) and the use of cymbals to accompany the singing was common. Different types of boats are used in different parts of Bengal. Horse racing was patronised most notably by the Dighapatia Rajas in Natore, and their Chalanbeel Horse Races have continued to take place annually for centuries.

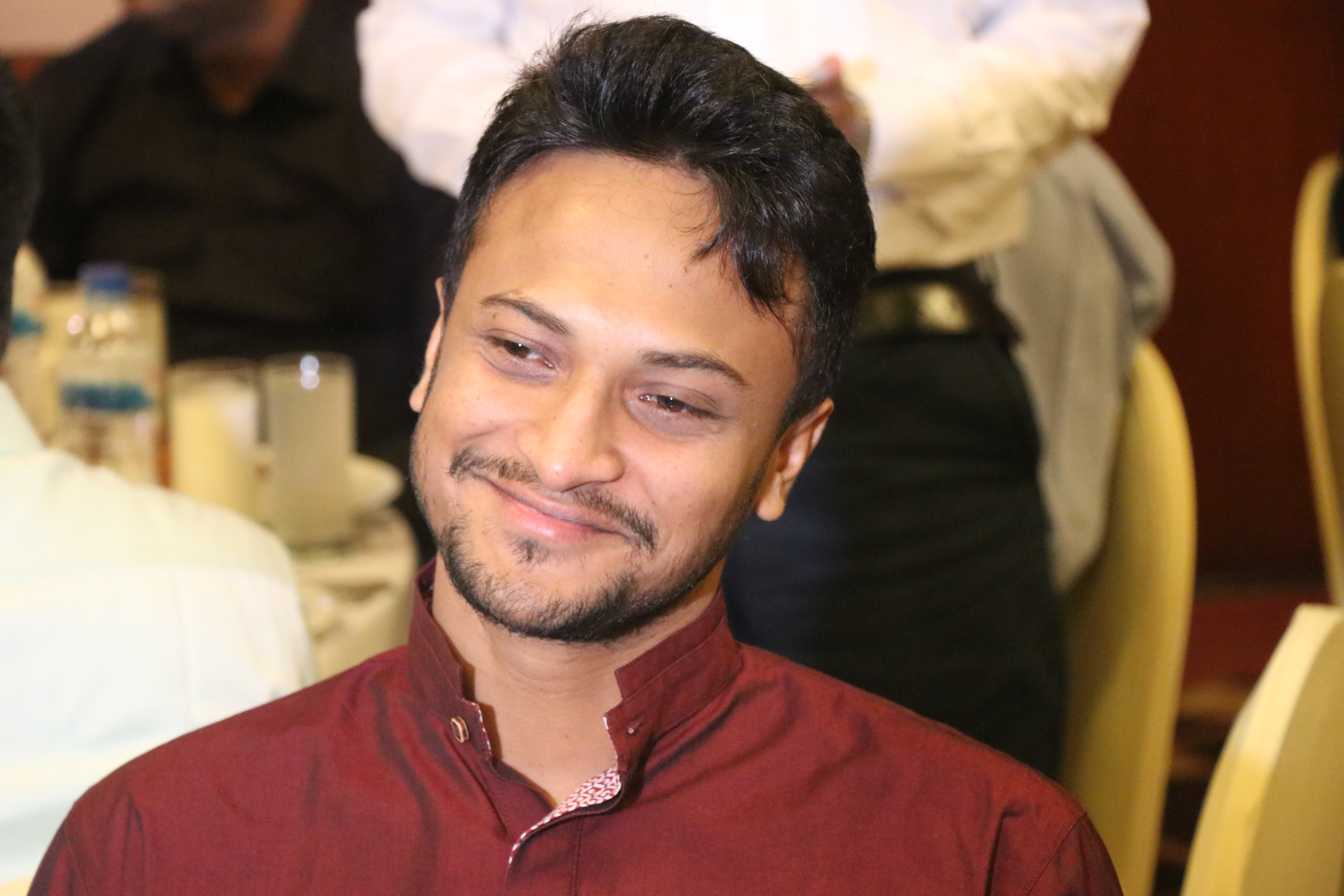
Cricketer Shakib Al Hasan is currently crowned the world's one of the best all-rounders in all formats, and one of the greatest of all times.

The oldest native football clubs of Bengal was Mohun Bagan A.C., which was founded in 1889, and Mohammedan SC, founded in 1891. Mohun Bagan's first major victory was in 1911, when the team defeated an English club known as the Yorkshire Regiment to win the IFA Shield. Since then, more and more clubs emerged in West Bengal, such as Mohun Bagan's main rival East Bengal FC, a team of East Bengali Hindus who had migrated to West Bengal following the 1947 Partition of India. The rivalry also portrayed the societal problems at that time as many of the Mohun Bagan fans were Ghotis who hated the East Bengali immigrants, though Hindu. Mohammed Salim of Calcutta became the first South Asian to play for a European football club in 1936. In his two appearances for Celtic F.C., he played the entire matches barefoot and scored several goals. In 2015, Hamza Choudhury became the first Bengali to play in the Premier League and is predicted to be the first British Asian to play for the England national football team.

Bengalis are very competitive when it comes to board and home games such as Pachisi and its modern counterpart Ludo, as well as Latim, Carrom Board, Chor-Pulish, Kanamachi and Chess. Rani Hamid is one of the most successful chess players in the world, winning championships in Asia and Europe multiple times. Ramnath Biswas was a revolutionary soldier who embarked on three world tours on a bicycle in the 19th century. Shakib Al Hasan, Mushfiqur Rahim, Mashrafe Bin Mortaza, Tamim Iqbal, Soumya Sarkar, Liton Das from Bangladesh and Pankaj Roy, Sourav Ganguly, Manoj Tiwary, Wriddhiman Saha, Mohammed Shami from West Bengal are internationally known cricketers . Local games include sports such as Kho Kho and Kabaddi, the latter being the national sport of Bangladesh.

=== Media ===
Bangladesh's Prothom Alo is the largest circulated Bengali newspaper in the country. India's Ananda Bazar Patrika, is the largest circulated Bengali newspaper in the country. Other prominent Bengali newspapers include the Ittefaq, Jugantor, Samakal, Janakantha in Bangladesh and Sangbad Pratidin, Ei Samay, Uttarbanga Sambad, Bartaman in India. Major English-language newspapers in Bangladesh include The Daily Star, New Age, and the weekly Holiday. The Statesman, published from Kolkata, is the India's one of the oldest English-language publication. Kolkata's Telegraph is the fifth largest English language and prominent newspaper in India.

== Literature ==
Bengal has one of the most developed literary traditions in Asia. A descent of ancient Sanskrit and Magadhi Prakrit, the Bengali language evolved circa 1000–1200 CE under the Pala Empire and the Sena dynasty. It became an official court language of the Sultanate of Bengal and absorbed influences from Arabic and Persian. Middle Bengali developed secular literature in the 16th and 17th centuries. It was also spoken in Arakan. The Bengali Renaissance in Calcutta developed the modern standardized form of the language in the late 19th and early 20th centuries. Rabindranath Tagore became the first Bengali writer to win the Nobel Prize in Literature in 1913, and was also the first non-European Nobel laureate. Kazi Nazrul Islam became known as the Rebel Poet of British India. After the partition of Bengal, a distinct literary culture developed in East Bengal, which later became East Pakistan and Bangladesh.

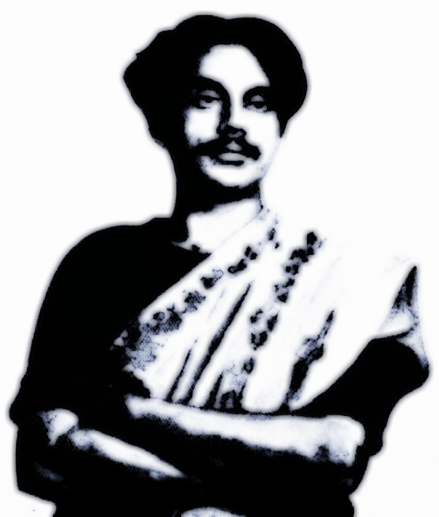
Kazi Nazrul Islam (Bidrohi Kabi; 'the rebel poet')

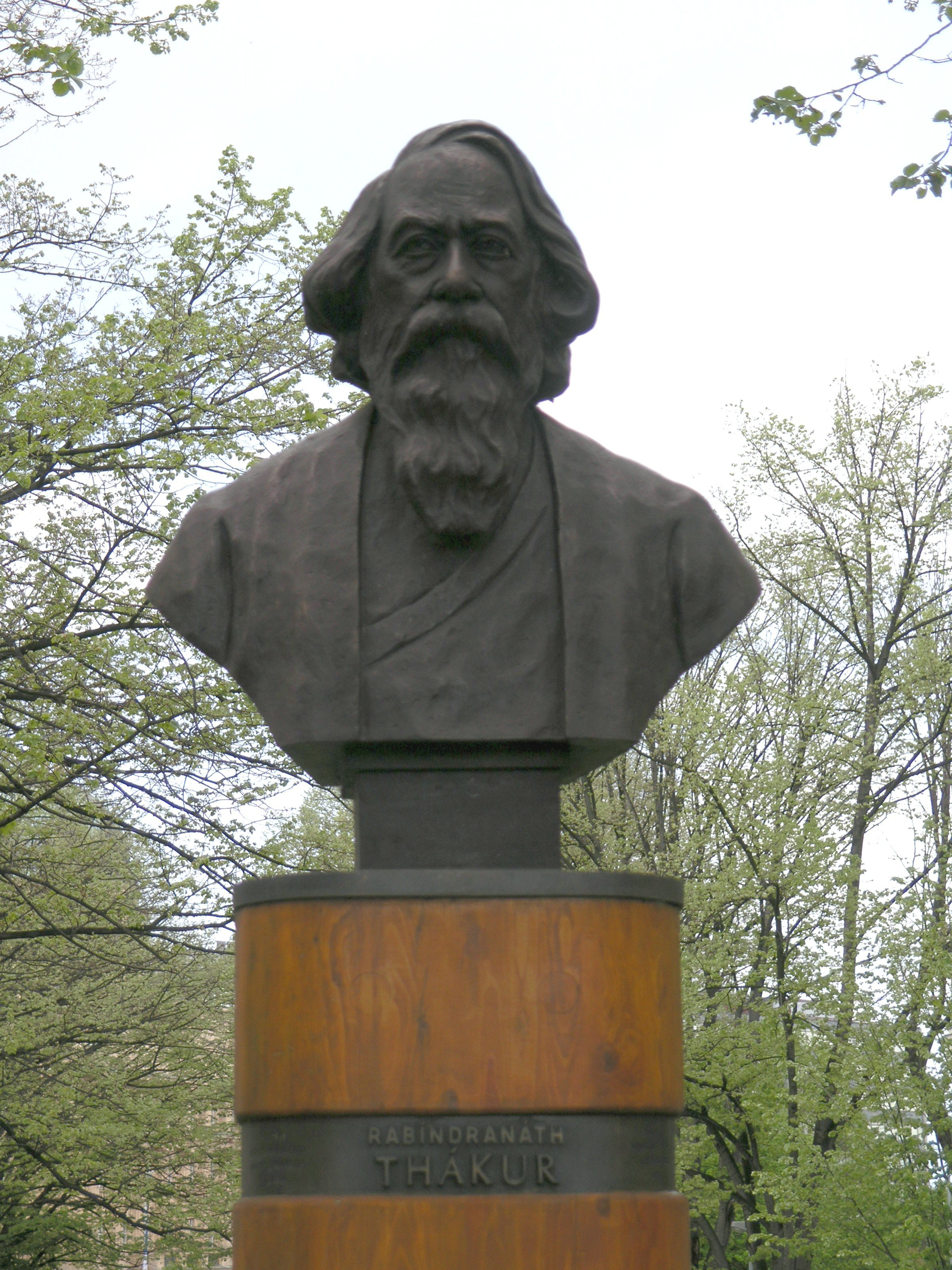
Rabindranath Tagore (Biswa Kabi; 'the poet of world')

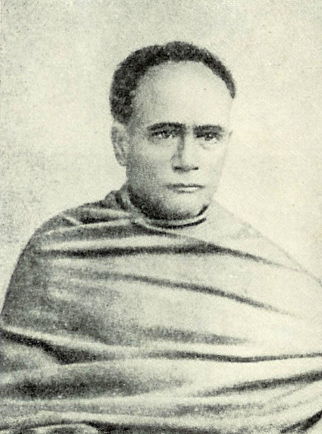
Iswar Chandra Vidyasagar (Father of modern Bengali alphabets and modern Bengali Prose)

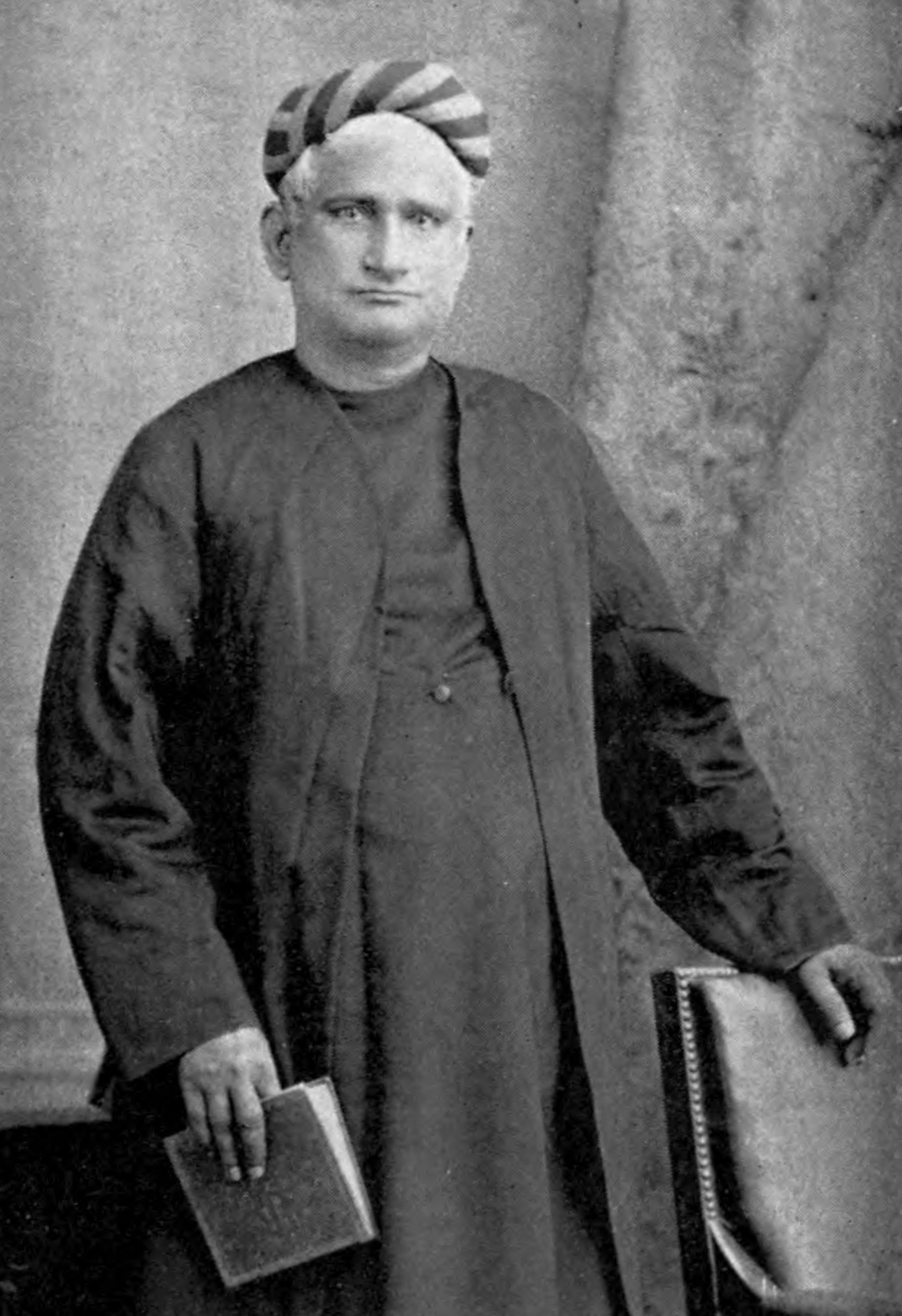
Bankim Chandra Chattopadhyay (Sahityo Samrat; 'the emperor of literature')

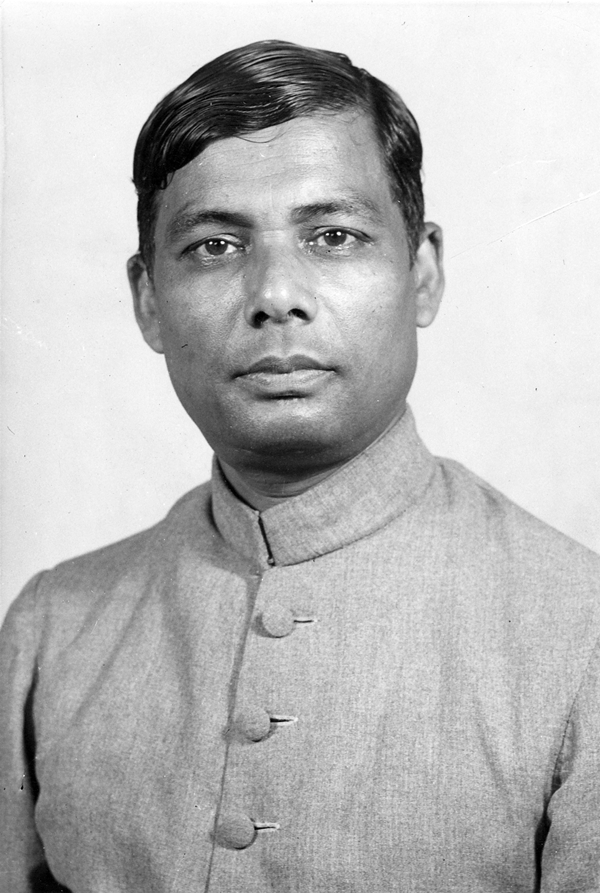
Jasimuddin (Polli Kabi; 'the rural poet')

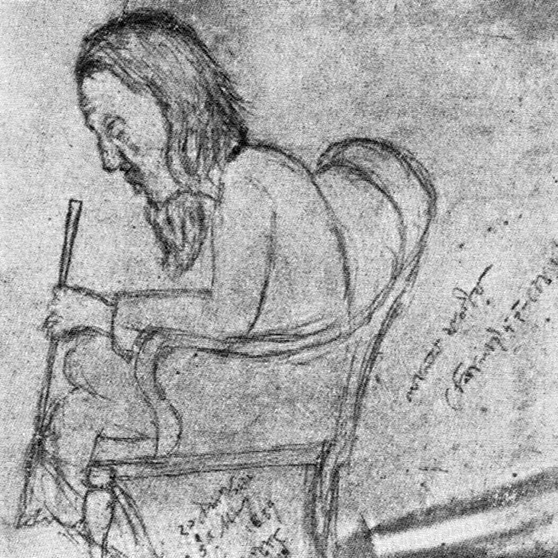
Lalon Fakir (Baul shamrat; 'the emperor of Bauls')

== Philosophy ==
The works of ancient philosophers from Bengal have been preserved at libraries in Tibet, China and Central Asia. These include the works of Atisa and Tilopa. Medieval Hindu philosophy featured the works of Chaitanya.

Sufi philosophy was highly influential in Islamic Bengal. Prominent Sufi practitioners were disciples of Jalaluddin Rumi, Abdul-Qadir Gilani and Moinuddin Chishti. One of the most revered Sufi saints of Bengal is Shah Jalal.

== See also ==
- Arts of West Bengal
- Performing arts of Bangladesh
