= Jarigan =

Music genre in Bangladesh

Jarigan (Bengali: জারি গান), (Persian Jari/zari for lamentation and Bengali gan for song) or (song of sorrow) is one of the few indigenous music art performances of Bangladesh and also found in West Bengal, the Barak Valley and the Brahmaputra Valley of India. Though varied and divergent in form, most are based on legends relating to Muslim heroes Hasan ibn Ali and Husayn ibn Ali, grandsons of Muhammad and other members of his family at Karbala.

The origins of Jarigan may be traced back to the early 17th century, when poetry started being written on the tragic stories of Karbala. One of the earliest recorded is Muhammad Khan's poem on Karbala titled Maktul Hussain (The Martyrdom of Hussain) in 1645, when Shi'ism had reached Bengal via Persia.

During the ten days Bengali celebration of Muharram and Ashura, morsia and Jari songs are sung in memory of Hazrat Imam Hussain and his family members. Over time, Muharram turned out to be one of the biggest festivals of Bengali culture and the Bengali community within Bengal. As Mary Frances Dunham noted in her ethnography of jarigan:

Muharram celebrations are enjoyed by all communities in Bangladesh. Hindu craftsmen and musicians are traditionally employed in the construction of taziyas, the symbolic tombs, and other decorations. They provide the drum playing that accompanies the fights and announces festival activities. Christians and Buddhists, in areas of Bangladesh where Muharram is celebrated, enjoy watching, if not performing in, the celebrations.
