= Korial sari =

Traditional handwoven mulberry silk sari of West Bengal

Production area
- Country: India
- State: West Bengal
- Location: Mirzapur, Panhgechia and Gaganpur

Details
- Ingredients: Silk
- Thread count: Not less than 90s–92s
- Length: 5.5–6.5 m (18–21 ft)
- Breadth: 1.2–1.25 m (3 ft 11 in – 4 ft 1 in)
- Style: Bengal tradition
- Style of anchal: Ornamented by beautiful fine design
- Style of borders: Plain or with extra warp
- Usage: Normal daily life & festivals

Status
- GI Status: Registered
- Application no.: 704
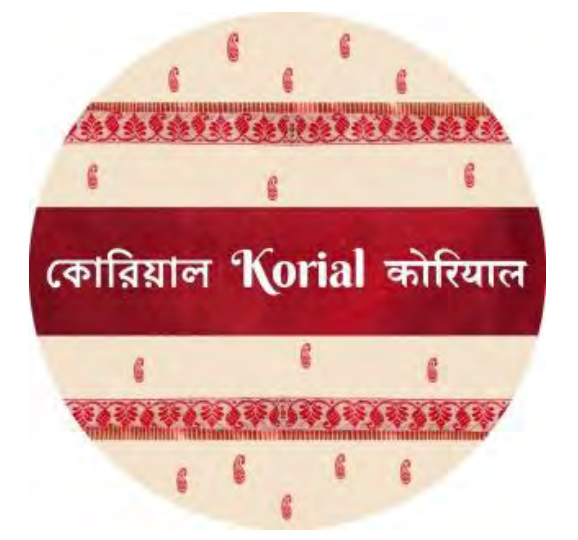
- Website: Korial sari

The Korial sari (Bengali: কোরিয়াল শাড়ি) is a traditional handwoven sari of West Bengal. These handloom saris are famous for the red border, novelty of sari designs, beautiful designs on the anchal, and natural fibres (mulberry silk) in weaving. The sari was the symbol of holiness, purity and good shine. In 2024, the Korial sari received recognition as a registered geographical indication.

Korial saris are traditionally woven on primitive hand looms, and the jala system is used to incorporate the designs. The Maku (shuttle) of the hand loom runs one side to another side by hand. 100 count silk yarn is used for weaving and also zari is used as per requirement. The sari has plain weave borders or borders with extra warp; The anchal have traditional floral and geometric designs, which are made using the jala method. The ground of the sari has buti design, which is made using jala method with additional weft. The speciality of Korial sari is that it is given a typical traditional khai finish after weaving and dried for a particular time. Finally, the sari is folded carefully.

As per 2024 data, 146 weavers are engaged in weaving Korial saris in Murshidabad and Birbhum districts of West Bengal. In the financial year 2018–19, the annual sales of this sari was ₹24.5 million.

== Materials ==
Silk has been produced in Murshidabad and Malda districts for centuries, local Malda silk and imported silk are used in the making of Korial. The materials are not made by the weavers, but they use materials purchased from local supply shops, including the silk used in the weaving, which is traditionally harvested from mulberry silkworms. The most common source of silk for these saris is mulberry silkworms reared on mulberry plants, from the cocoons of mulberry silkworms, farmers collect silk. Some quantity of silk is imported mainly from South India by local traders.

Other materials include zaris and dyes. Golden zari yan are used in saris - which are mainly artificial. Natural dyes are used to colouring of the silk yarn.

== Sari making ==
Historically, almost everyone of the weaver family is involved in sari making, handling every step of the production process, from the preparation of the yarn to the final weaving of the sari. Weavers carry an incredible creative power in their eyes and hands, which is traditionally expressed through the technical skills and knowledge of design and color inherited from their forefathers.

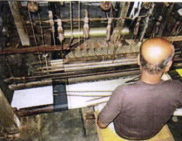
A weaver weaving a Korial sari in Murshidabad district, West Bengal.

Two ply twisted filament mulberry silk yarn is used in Korial saris. Twisting of silk yarn is done by weavers. To prepare warp sheet, the yarn is spun onto the bobbin from the hank; some weavers use bobbin winding machines for this task while others use traditional spinning wheels. The warp yarn contained in these bobbins is prepared into rope form using vertical sectional warping machine. The yarn is dried (if necessary) after boiling in alkali solution. The entanglement of yarn is opened by the weavers, and the broken end is mended by spreading it lengthwise along the road. Finally the warp yarn is tied to a wooden beam.

== Tools ==
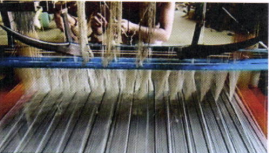
The Jala system used in weaving the Korial sari.

Traditionally, the main tools for making Korial saris are the primitive hand-loom and jala system. Primitive looms are the looms of early times; in these looms, the shuttle is thrown from one end to the other by hand, thus requiring more time for weaving. That's why a lot of time is required to weave Korial saris.

Jala system on handloom is a very primitive process, this system plays an important role in Korial sari weaving. A jala is a structure that looks like a hook. This system is mainly used for making buti designs on saris. Jala process can include designs according to the desired area of the sari. When the design is incorporated into the sari, the jala is inserted in specific positions.
