= Chitra Deb =

Bengali novelist and editor

- Born: 24 November 1943; Purnea
- Died: 2 October 2017; Kolkata
- Occupation: Author
- Spouse: unmarried
- Writing career
- Notable work: Thakurbarir Andarmahal
- Notable awards: Chittaranjan Bandopadhyay birth centenary award

Chitra Deb (24 November 1943 – 2 October 2017) was a Bengali novelist and editor.

== Early life ==
Deb was born in 1943 in Purnea, British India. She completed her M.A and Ph.D. in Bengali Literature from Calcutta University.

== Literary career ==
Smt. Deb started her career in Anandabazar Patrika and worked there since 1980 to 2004. She was the in charge of library section of the ABP. Deb edited and translated a number of books and also wrote a few historical novels for children. She researched and written extensively on the contribution of women in the social and cultural history of Bengal. Deb's most popular work was about women of the Tagore family. Her book Thakurbarir Andarmahal was published in 1980, received an award from the Bangla Academy and was translated into many languages. She also received 'Chittaranjan Bandopadhyay birth centenary award' by Bangiya Sahitya Parisad. Her books are:

- Thakurbarir Andarmahal
- Thakurbarir Bahirmahal
- Bibahobasorer Kabyokatha
- Antopurer Atmokotha
- Mahila Daktar
- Vingraher Basinda
- Apon Kheyale Cholen Raja
- Rupobotir Mala
- Bharater Rani
- Buddhodeb Keman Dekhte Chilen
- Advut Jato Hatir Galpo
- Siddhidatar Antordhan

== Death ==
Deb was afflicted with myasthenia gravis. She died on 2 October 2017 in Kolkata.
