= Rickshaw painting of Bangladesh =

Neo-romantic oil paintings on rickshaws

- UNESCO Intangible Cultural Heritage
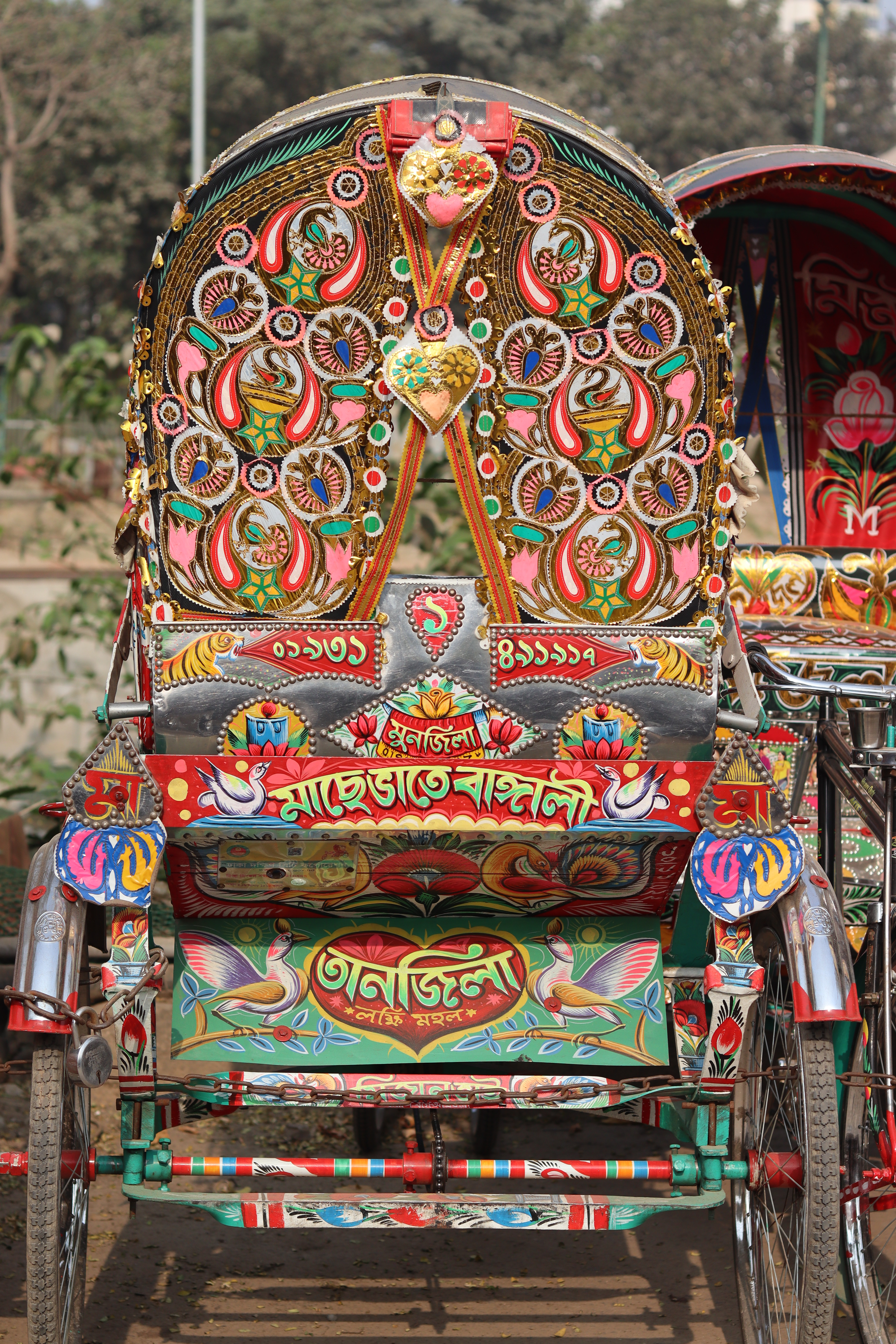
- Country: Bangladesh
- Reference: 01589
- Region: Asia and the Pacific

Inscription history
- Inscription: 2023 (18th session)
- List: Representative

Rickshaw painting (Bengali: রিকশাচিত্র) is a form of neo-romanticism emerging in Bangladesh. The art in question consists of oil paintings on the rear of the canvas roof of rickshaws, done by local street artists, who also paint the various landscapes, portraits and personal statements of the driver. Rickshaws and rickshaw paintings of Bangladesh are listed as 'intangible cultural heritage' by UNESCO.

== History ==
In Bangladesh, rickshaw art dates back to the 1950s, and every conceivable part of the rickshaw is painted. In addition to geometric designs, there are depictions of flowers, birds and even popular actresses. The rickshaw can be decorated to show the driver's religious beliefs and sometimes even a commentary on current social issues. In Bangladesh, rickshaw art is looked down upon by the elite population.

The three-wheeled pedicab, more commonly known as the rickshaw, has been around since the 1940s. Initially, they were undecorated, but starting in the late 1940s, the faces of movie stars began appearing as decorative motifs on shields at the back of the rickshaws along with a variety of floral paintings. The unique trend of rickshaw art started from Rajshahi and Dhaka in Bangladesh and took its own style in each district. For instance, Chittagong, being a more pious city than Dhaka, mostly had floral or scenery art, whereas Comilla has plain rickshaws with beautiful dark blue or green hoods, on which are sewn an appliqué of a minaret or floral design enshrining the word "Allah".

Artwork on the wheels of the rickshaws is done using very bold, bright and raw colours, like fluorescent green, dark red and so on. The blaze of colours also helps to make them long lasting.

Author Joanna Kirkpatrick states her definition of rickshaw art:

I consider it "peoples' art". It is not necessary to force it into a unitary category as it combines folkloric, movie, political and commercial imagery and techniques. It serves the expression of heart's desires of the man in the street for women, power, wealth, as well as for religious devotion. Rickshaw art also serves prestige and economic functions for the people who make, use and enjoy it.

Rickshaw art also reflects the economic globalization process, which is occurring all over the world today, for instance, those rickshaws with Osama bin Laden's pictures. Rickshaws are not only painted but also decorated with tassels, tinsel and colourful plastic.

Rickshaw art covers the whole rickshaw decoration, from painted backboards and rear side panels to cut-outs appliquéd on to hoods, as well as brass vases replete with plastic or paper flowers. The painted rectangular metal board at the backside, between the two wheels, leaves a trail of passion that the Rickshaw artist puts in his creations.

This living pop art in Bangladesh is primarily created by illiterate rickshaw artists. They learn their techniques by living with Ustat (masters) from boyhood. They do not have copyrights, and in most cases are not attributed by name on their art. In the back of rickshaws, however, there is generally a mark of the maker indicated by a bold steel pin, for example, "Fazlu Mistri". Today, rickshaw art and artists are in a 'struggle of existence'. Third and fourth generations are increasingly less interested in learning the art due to low incomes of two to three dollars a day as well as the lack of recognition.

In 2023, UNESCO inscribed Dhaka's rickshaws and rickshaw paintings on its list of intangible cultural heritage.

== See also ==
- Truck art in South Asia

== Bibliography ==
- Kuntala Lahiri-Dutt and David Williams. (2010). Moving Pictures: The Rickshaw Art of Bangladesh. ISBN 978-0944142639 Ahmedabad: Mapin Books.
