= Arts of West Bengal =

Cultural heritage of West Bengal

The Indian state of West Bengal has a rich religious, cultural and traditional heritage. Arts and crafts in West Bengal underwent many changes over time giving an artistic diversity today in the forms of traditional handicrafts, terracotta, painting and carving, dances and music.

== Music ==
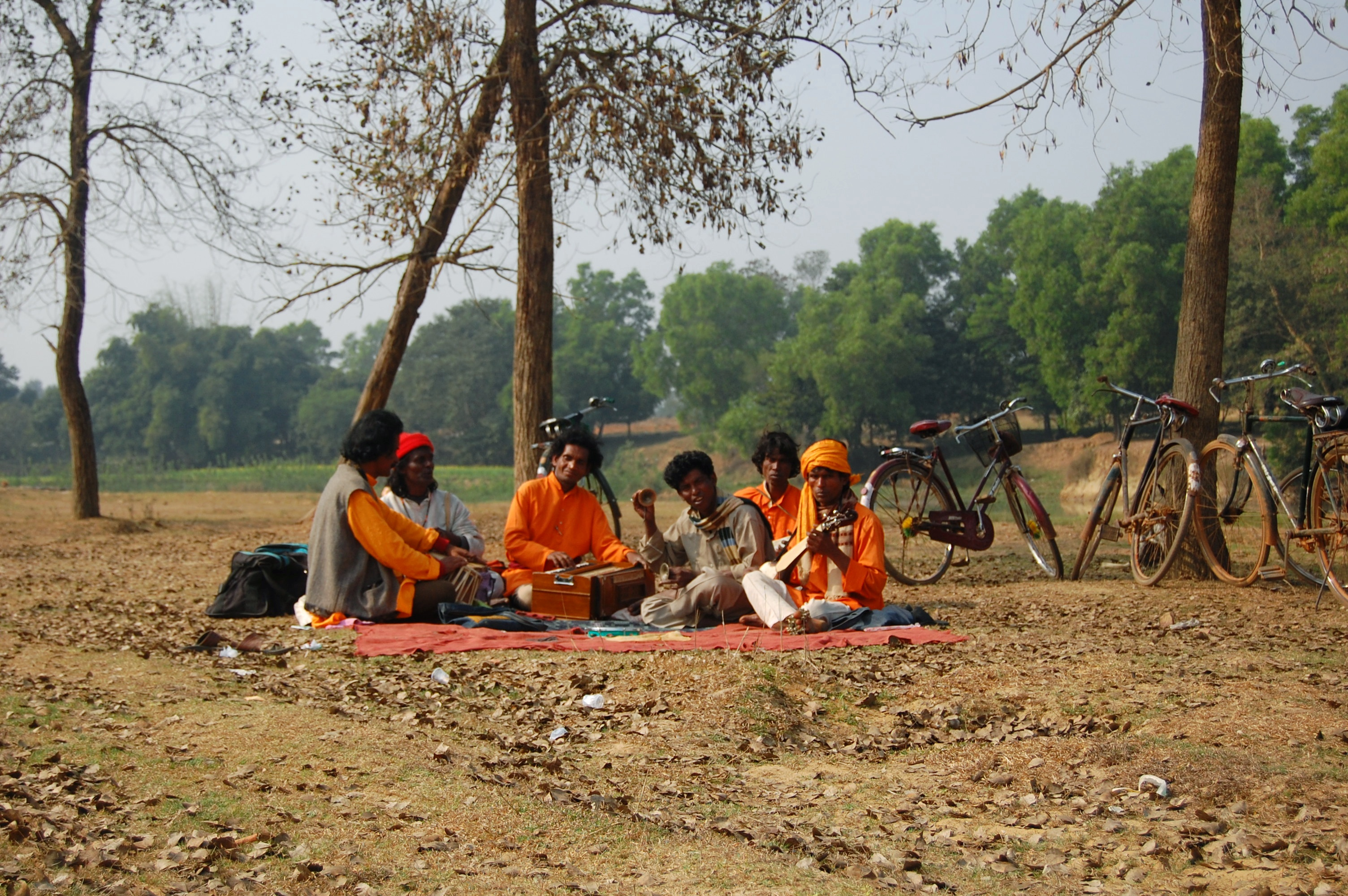
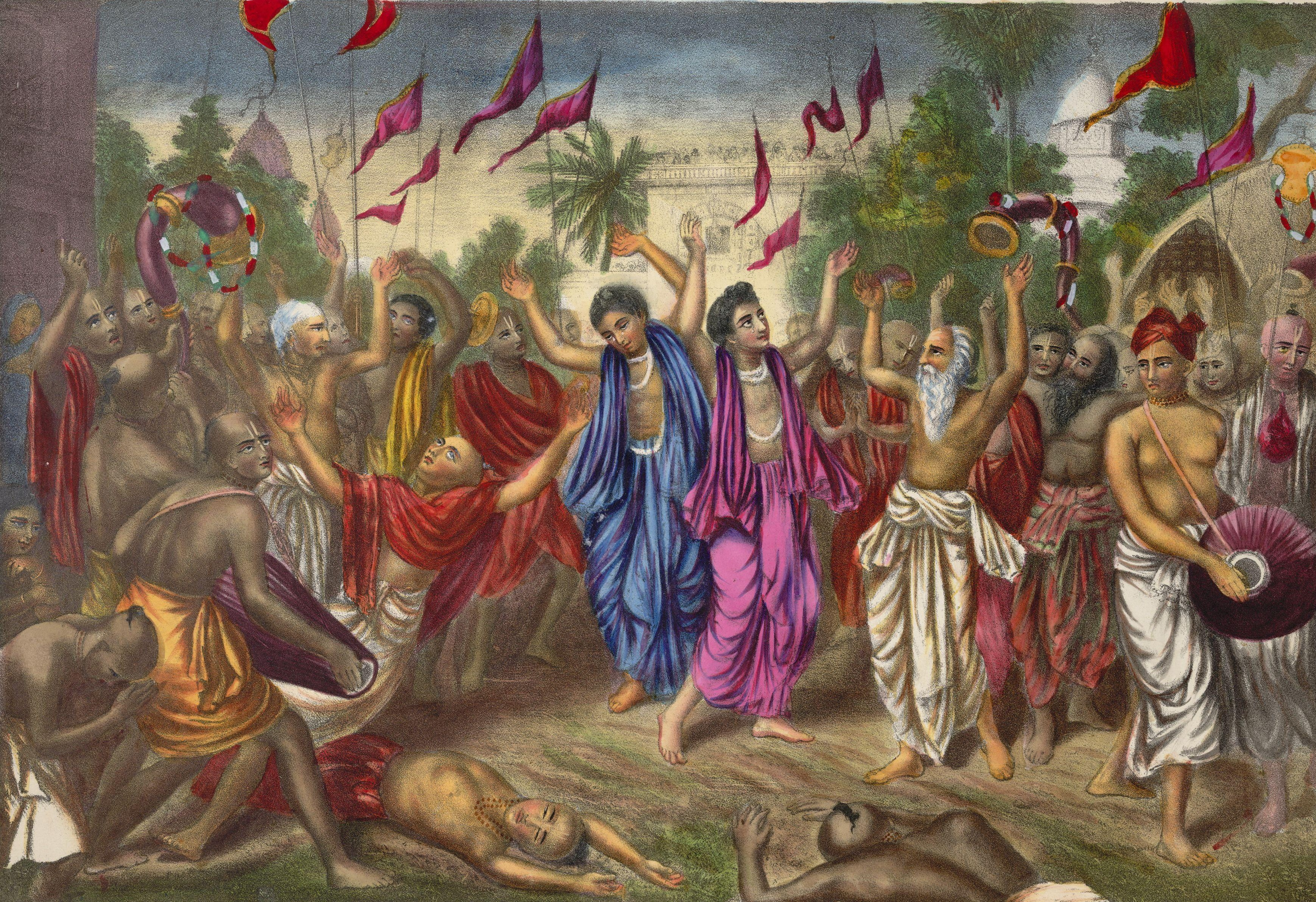
Left: Baul singers in performance at Santiniketan, India; Right: Some Vaishnavism sub-traditions believe in public kirtan performance, with songs and dance. A painting of a 19th-century performance by Chaitanya group in Bengal.

The music of West Bengal includes multiple indigenous musical genres such as Baul, Bishnupuri Classical, Kirtan, Shyama Sangeet, Rabindra Sangeet, Nazrul Geeti, Atulprasadi, Dwijendrageeti, Paramartha Sangeet, Probhati Sangeet, Kantageeti, Ganasangeet, Adhunik Gaan, Bengali rock etc. West Bengal has a rich culture with the classical and folk songs.

The Bishnupur Gharana is the sole Classical (Drupad) gharana of Bengal. It originated in Bishnupur, Bankura with the court musicians of the Malla Kings. The bauls are a mystic group of singers and musicals, immensely popular in the countryside. They perform using a khamak, ektara and dotara. Rabindra Sangeet, also known as Tagore songs, are songs written and composed by Rabindranath Tagore. They have distinctive characteristics in the music of Bengal, popular in India and Bangladesh. Rabindra Sangeet has been an integral part of Bengal culture for over a century. Shyama Sangeet is a genre of Bengali devotional songs dedicated to the Hindu goddess Shyama or Kali which is a form of supreme universal mother-goddess Durga or parvati. It is also known as Shaktagiti or Durgastuti.

Kirtan is also a true song which describe the mythological epic. Chaitanya Mahaprabhu starts the Hare Krishna movement from Nabadwip.

Other songs like Hapu song, Bhadu song, Gombhira, Tusu song, Bhatiyali song, Patua Sangeet, Bolan Song etc. are all Bengali folk songs.

Generally all music dedicated to goddess Mother Kali is called 'Shyama Sangeet' in Bengali. Two famous singers of this Bengali Shyama Sangeet are Pannalal Bhattacharya and Dhananjay Bhattacharya. Pannalal Bhattacharya's elder brother Prafulla Bhattacharya and middle brother Dhananjay Bhattacharya were the first music teachers of saint artist Pannalal Bhattacharya. Dhananjay Bhattacharya stopped singing devotional songs after finding devotional spirit in his brother Pannalal. However, after the demise of Pannalal Bhattacharya, he contributed again in Bengali music with many devotional songs by his sweet, melodious voice.

Paramartha Sangeet is a collection of devotional songs, which were composed and sung by Maharshi Nagendranath Bhaduri, a renowned yogi and spiritual figure. Nagendranath Bhaduri founded "Sanatana Dharma Pracharini Sabha" in 1891, a society dedicated to spreading the message of Sanatana Dharma. This organization, later known as "Nagendra Math" under the guidance of his disciple Dhyanaprakash Brahmachari, published a compilation of songs called Paramartha Sangitabali. This compilation includes three songs composed by Nagendranath himself, which were reportedly sung in the presence of Ramakrishna.

== Dance ==
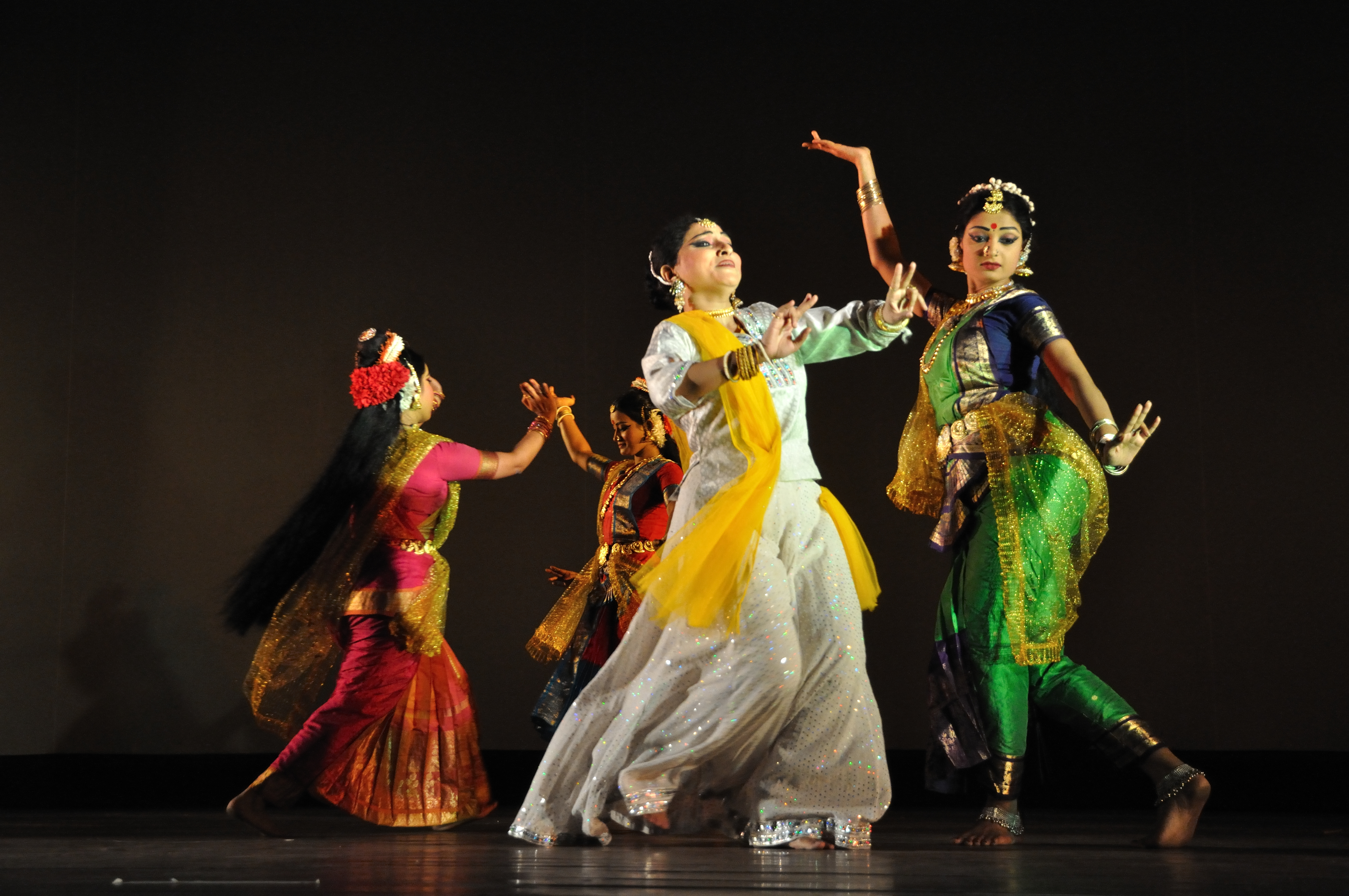
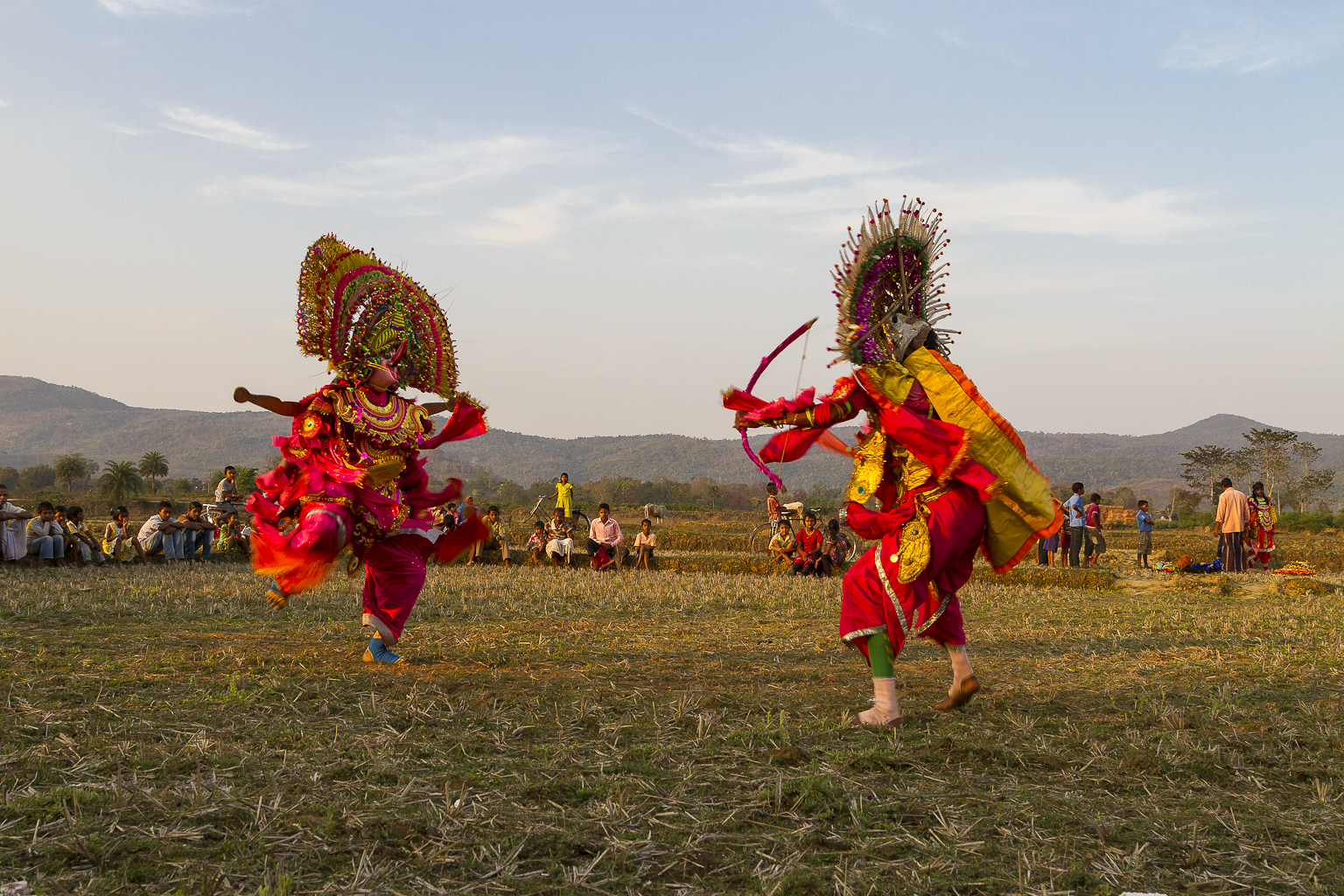
Left: Dance with Rabindra Sangeet in Kolkata; Right: Chhau Mask dance parforming in the field.

Songs and dances are connected with each other. The rich cultural heritage and creative minds of the people of Bengal are best reflected in their traditional folk dances like the martial dance or the harvest dance. In modern West Bengal rural Bengal takes the lead in keeping the old customs and the associated song and dance. The folk dances of West Bengal deal with a variety of themes such as religion, prayers, festivals and rituals; others talk about society.

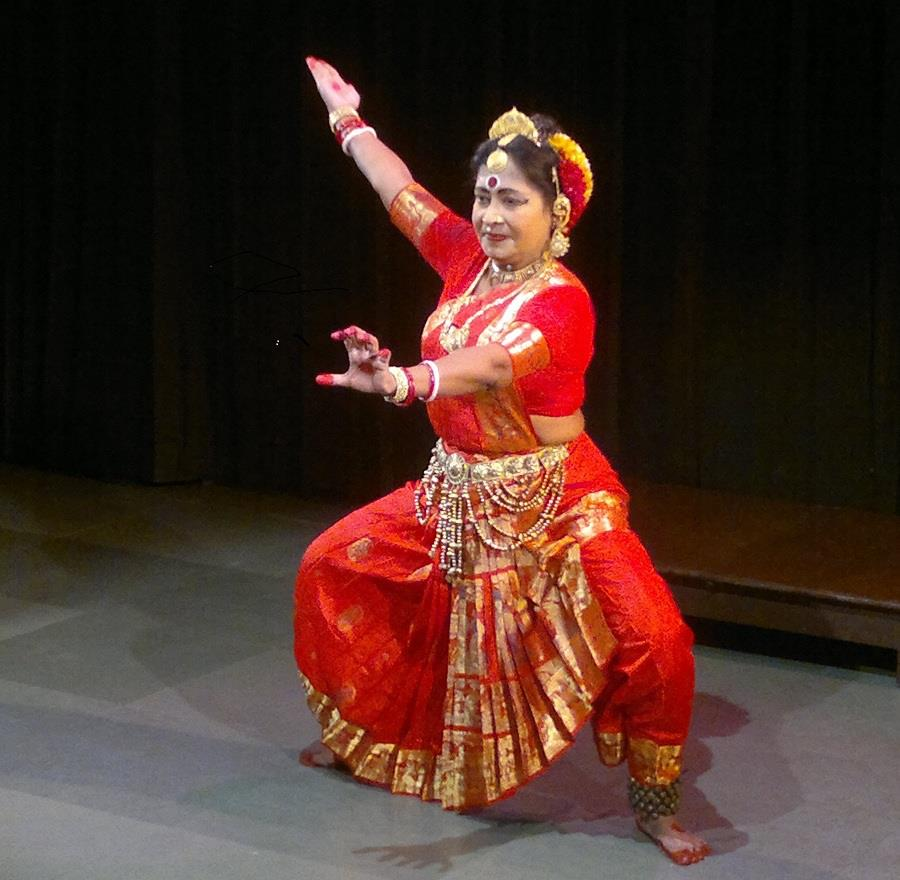
Left: Performance of Gaudiya Nritya by Mahua Mukherjee; Right: Gaudiya Nritya.

=== Gaudiya Nritya ===
Gaudiya Nritya (Bengali: গৌড়ীয় নৃত্য) or Gauriya Nritya, is a Bengali classical dance tradition. It originates from Gauda, also known as Gaur, in Bengal.

It has been reconstructed by Mahua Mukherjee. It is not recognised as an Indian classical dance by the Sangeet Natak Akademi, but study of it is eligible for scholarships from the Ministry of Culture of India. Scholarly reception of the reconstruction ranges from caution to scepticism.

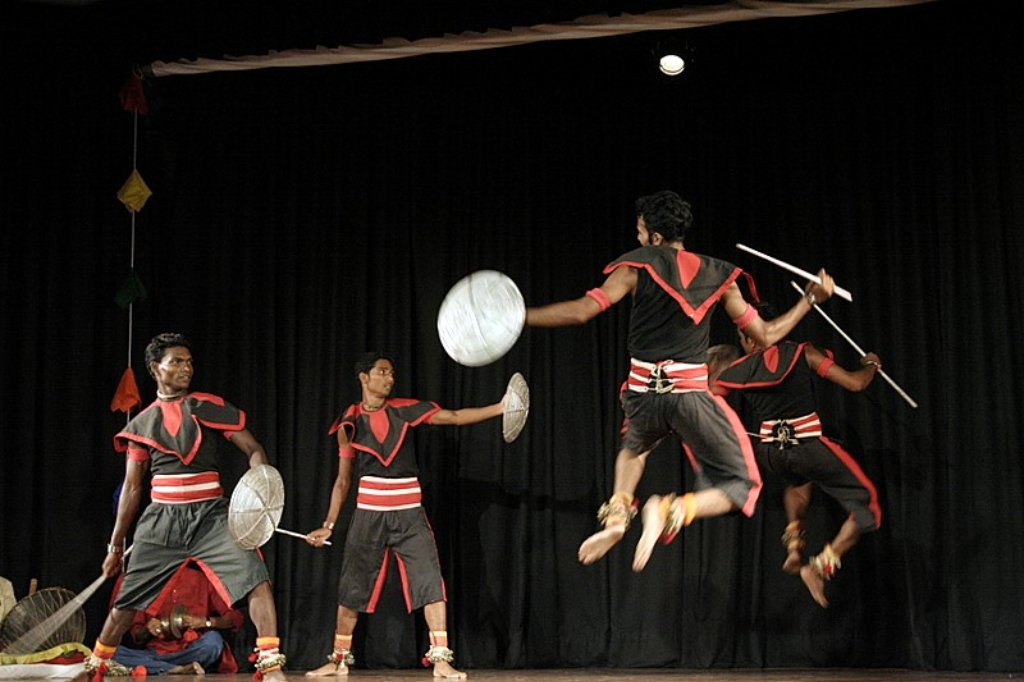
Dhali Dance performance

=== Martial dances ===
As a cultural tradition there are many Bengali folk dances describing the mythological wars. These martial or war dances are Purulia Chhau dance, Raibenshe dance, Stick dance or Laghur Nritya, Ranapa Dance, Dhali and Paika Nritya, Kukri Nritya etc.

=== Harvest Dances ===
The cultural folk dance is mostly related with seasons, sowing of seeds, rains, harvesting in West Bengal. It is celebrated with much ardor by village folks, especially the farming community. Gombhira dance of Malda district is associated with mythology. Tushu dance, Nabanna dance, Nnoila broto etc. are also related with farming. Some tribal dance like Santhali dance, Rabha dance, Mundari dance, Rajbanshi dance etc. performed to the accompaniment of a number of musical instrument and are quite elaborate in nature.

== Masks ==
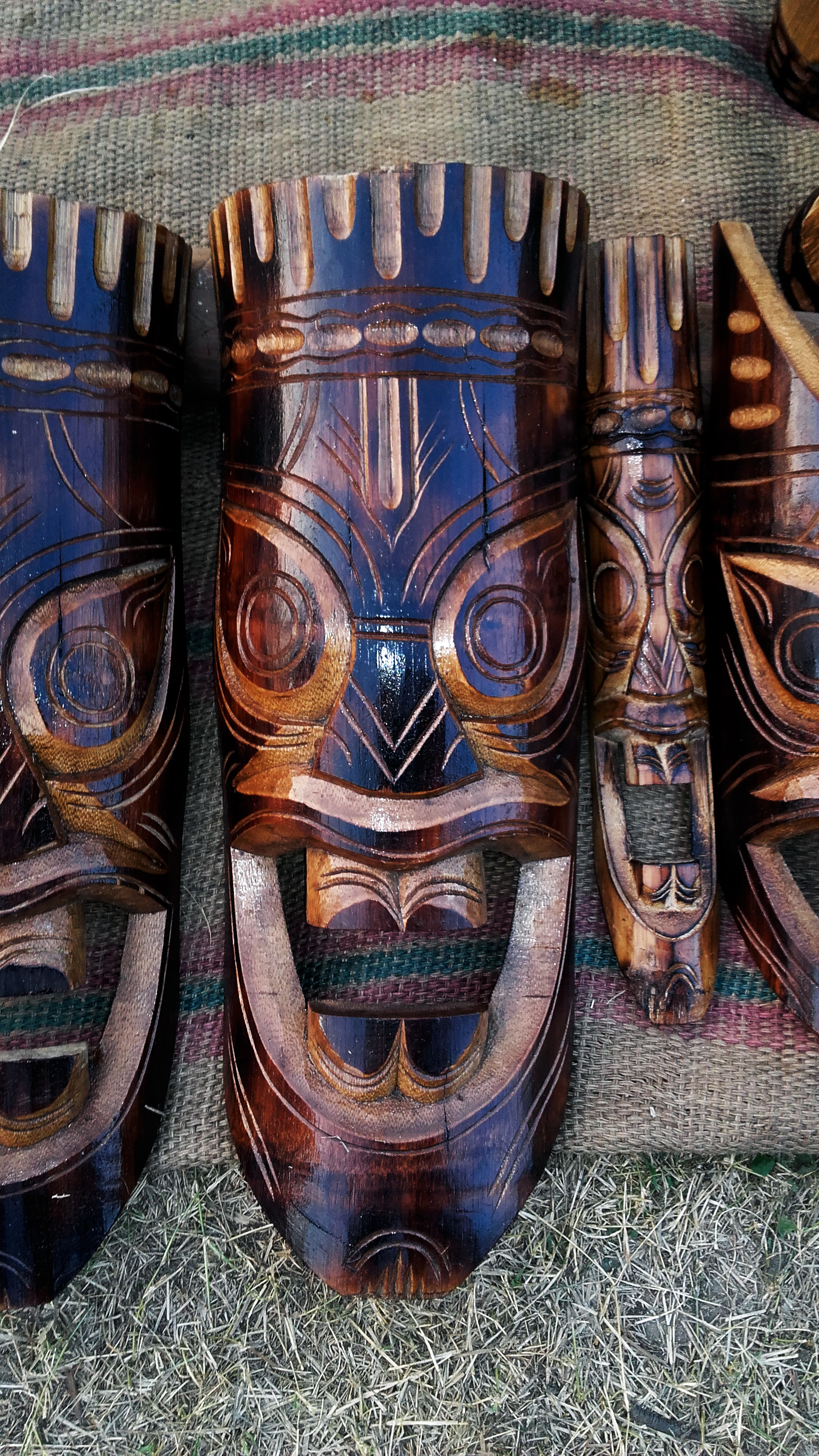
Tribal bamboo mask from Dinajpur

Mask or Mukhosh of West Bengal, as it known and it has a mysterious history. Mostly it is used for the Mask Dance, a folk dance of West Bengal. The wearing of these masks is connected with early types of folklore and religion. There are various types of masks made of clay, wood, sponge wood or shola, pith, paper etc. Generally, half masks are made up of clay, pith and paper, and wooden masks are very rare. Some of the masks came from the Tribal of West Bengal. Geographically, West Bengal comes well within this mask using culture zone. Masks in West Bengal are mostly used in folk dance. UNESCO selected The Rural Craft Hub of Bengal to showcase their artwork in Paris in 2015.

=== Chhau mask ===
Chhau dance is listed on UNESCO's world heritage list of dances. The main difference between the Purulia chhau and Orisha chhau is in the use of the mask. Purulia chhau used the mask in dance, but Orisha does not have the mask thereby adding facial expression with body movement and gesture. Purulia chhau dancers wear earthy and theatrical masks which represent the mythological characters.

=== Gambhira mask ===
Gambhira mask is a part of Gomira dance which originated in North and the South Dinajpur of West Bengal. The word Gomira is colloquial from Gram-Chandi, a female deity. The origin of this craft is no doubt very old and some of the craftsmen claim it is at least as old as the beginning of Kali Yuga. The Gomira dances are organized to propitiate the deity and to usher in the good forces and drive out the evil forces. This mask is used in the war dance. It is also called Mukha Khel meaning the game of masks.

=== Others ===
Ghurni region of Krishnanagar has been a notable center of clay art for a long time. Their clay masks of Durga and others are well known for their beauty and the masks follow a contemporary style. Kolkata Kumartuli is well known for clay masks. The masks are made in clay and then sun-dried and finally coloured and decorated with sponge wood or foil. Potters have been receiving attention for sculpting Bengali deities. Dokra is unique folk art of West Bengal. Metal casting dokra mask is created various contemporary sculptures with this art form. Gita Karmakar, a female artist from Bankura, has been awarded the President's award. Her works of Dokra art are equally popular in other countries. Durga face is a well known shola mask of Murshidabad. It's mainly used as a decorative ptece. For making this masks, shola is pulled from water and dried. Then it is cut with the knife according to the design. The most attractive fact, Murshidabad is recognize for the shola work.

== Terracotta art ==
=== Architecture ===
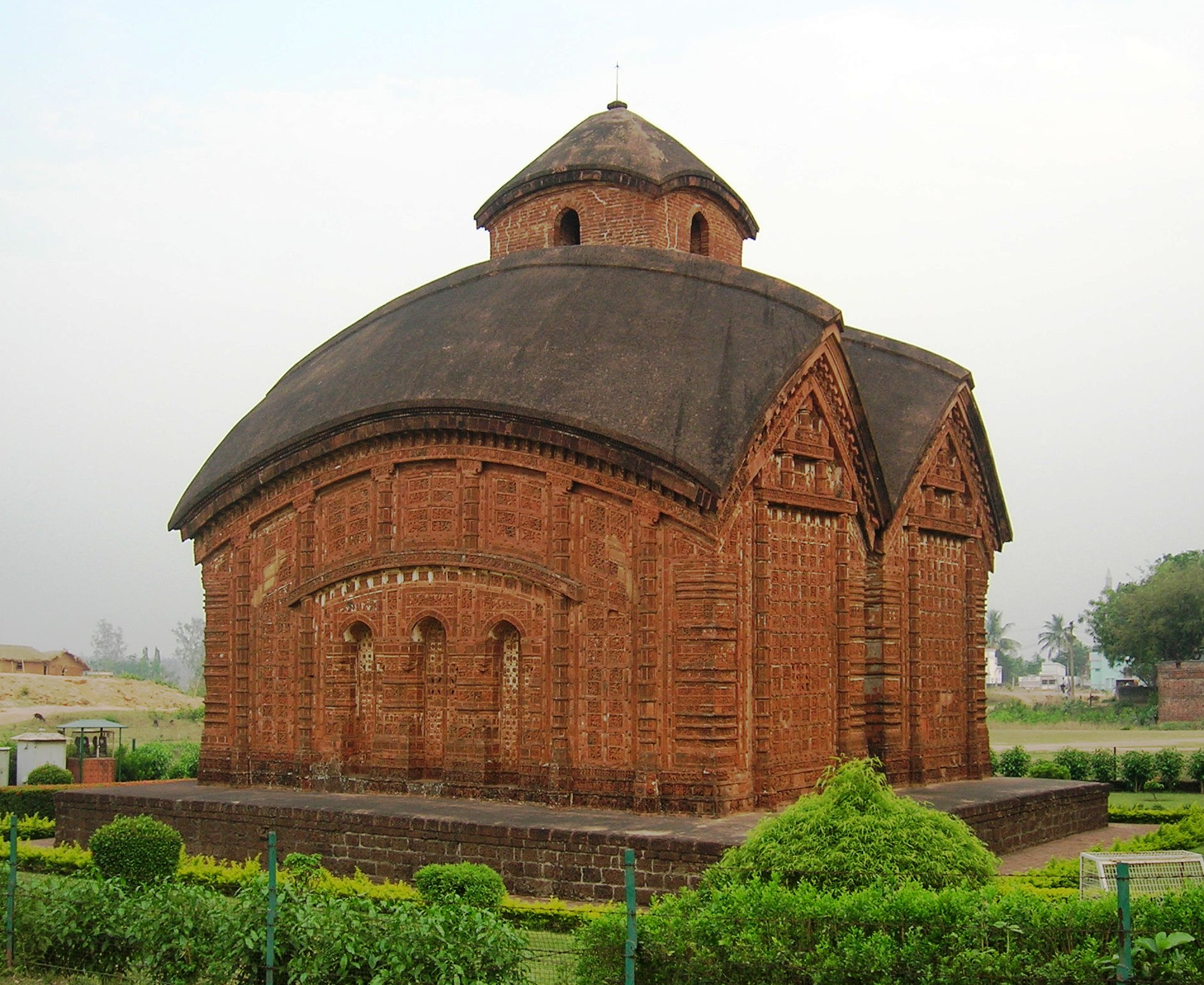
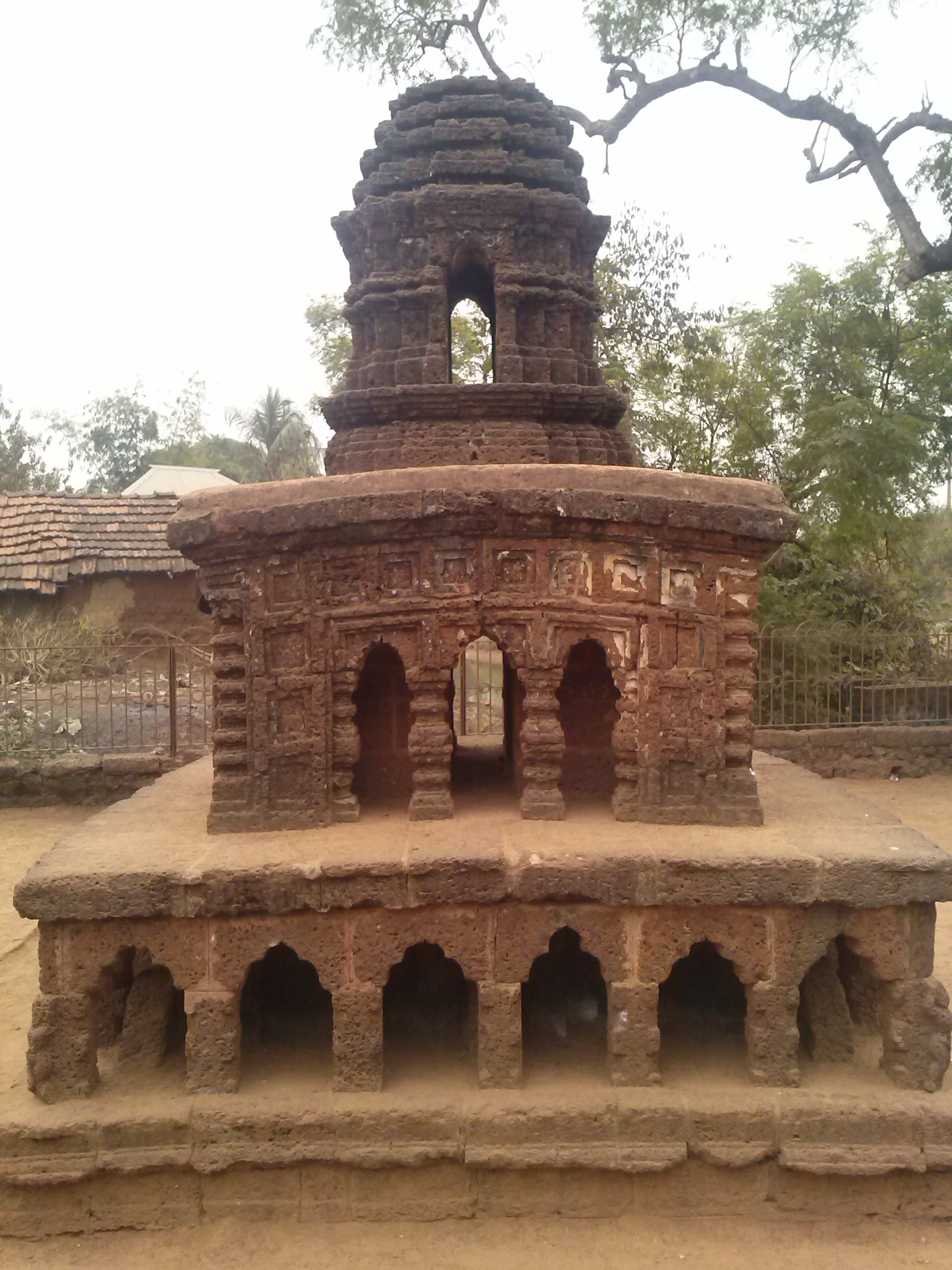
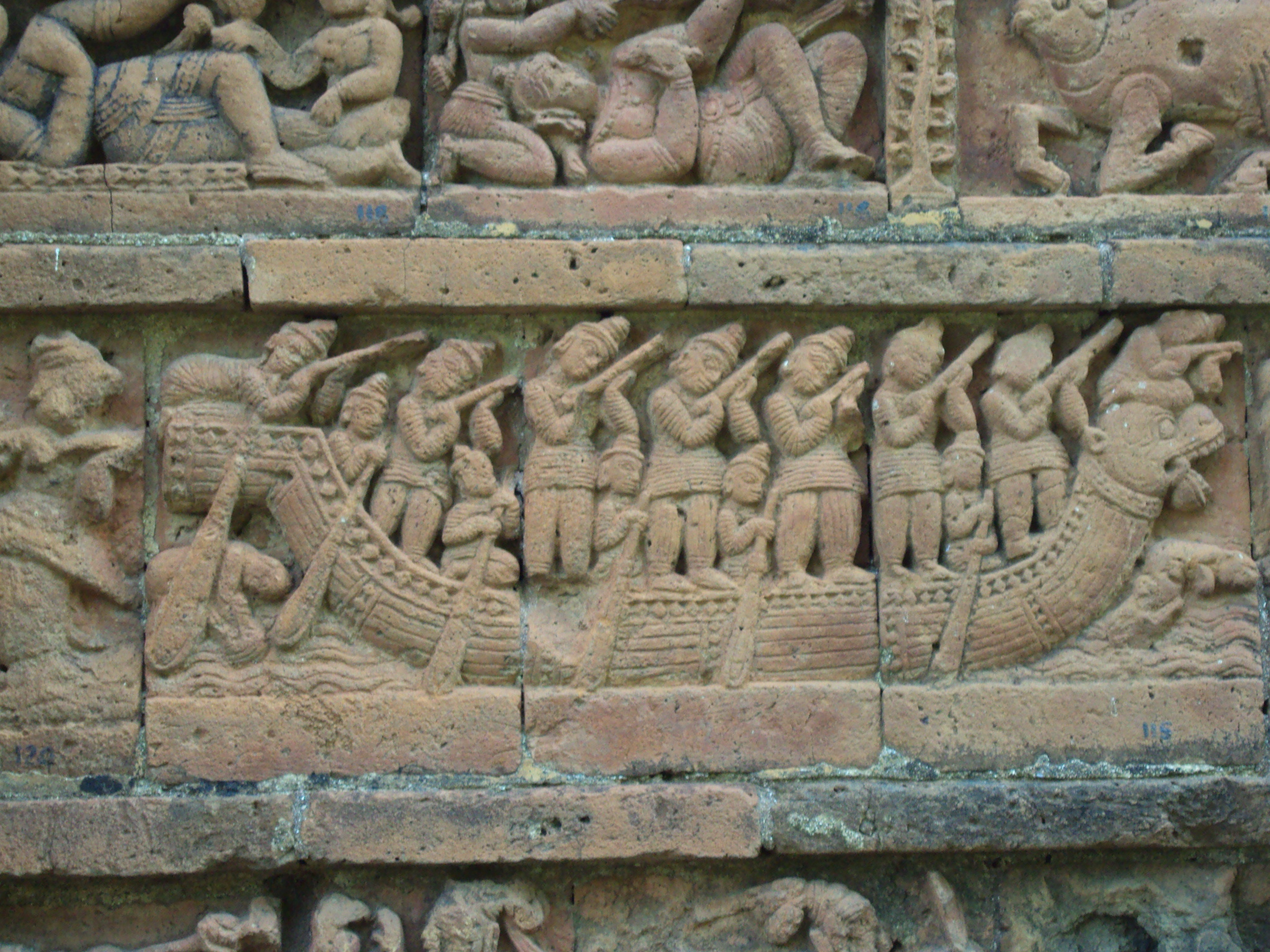
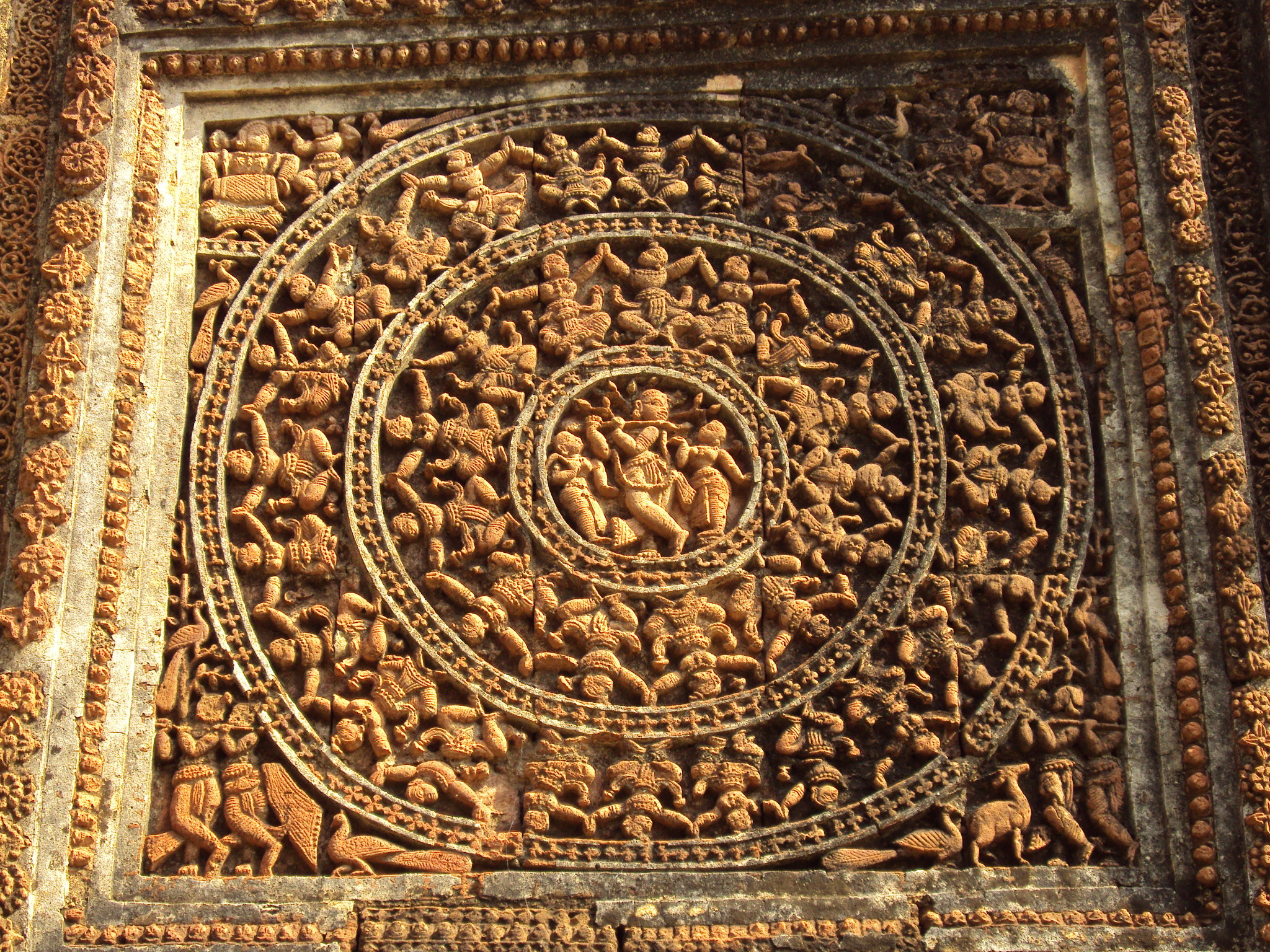
From top left to bottom right (a) Jor Bangla Temple of 16 century in Bankura; (b) historic stone chariot of Bankura; (c) Terracotta relief of temple of Bankura; (d) Terracotta motif.

There are significant examples of fine arts in Bengal from earlier times such as terracotta art of Hindu temples. The roofing style of Bengali Hindu temple architecture is unique and closely related to the paddy roofed traditional building style of rural Bengal. Roofing styles include the Jor-bangla Style, do-chala, char-chala, at-chala, deul, ek-ratna, pancharatna and navaratna. Bishnupur in West Bengal has a remarkable set of such temples which being built from the Malla dynasty are examples of this style. Most of these temples are covered on the outer surface with terracotta reliefs which contains plenty of secular materials making these important to reconstruct the social structure from these times.

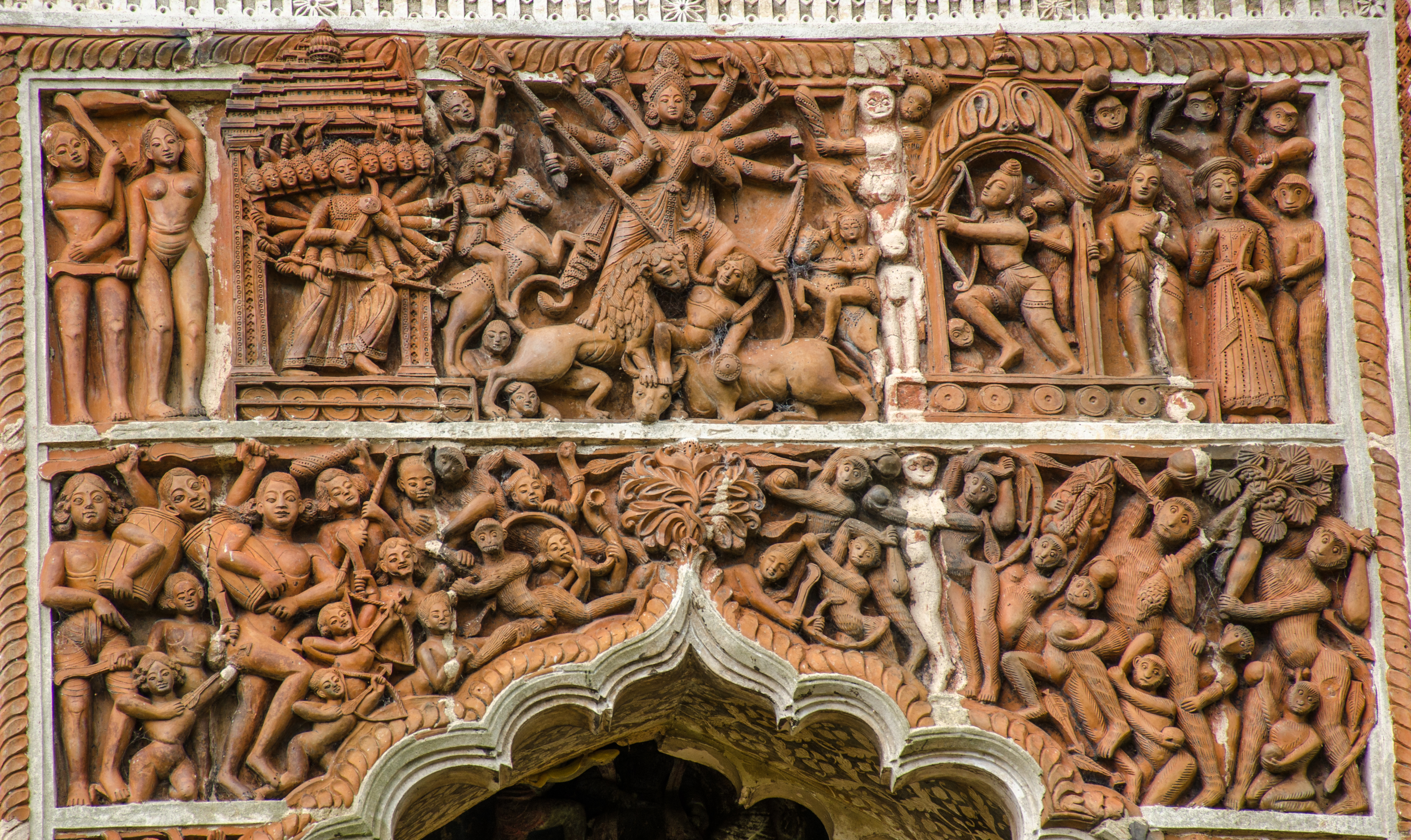
Terracota Panel of Pratepshbra mandir, Kalna

The temple structures contain gabled roofs which are colloquially called the chala, For example, a gabled roof with an eight sided pyramid structured roof will be called "ath chala" or literally the eight faces of the roof. And frequently there is more than one tower in the temple building. These are built of laterite and brick bringing them at the mercy of severe weather conditions of southern Bengal. Dakshineswar Kali Temple is one example of the Bhanja style while the additional small temples of Shiva along the river bank are examples of southern Bengal roof style though in much smaller dimension.

=== Terracotta dolls ===
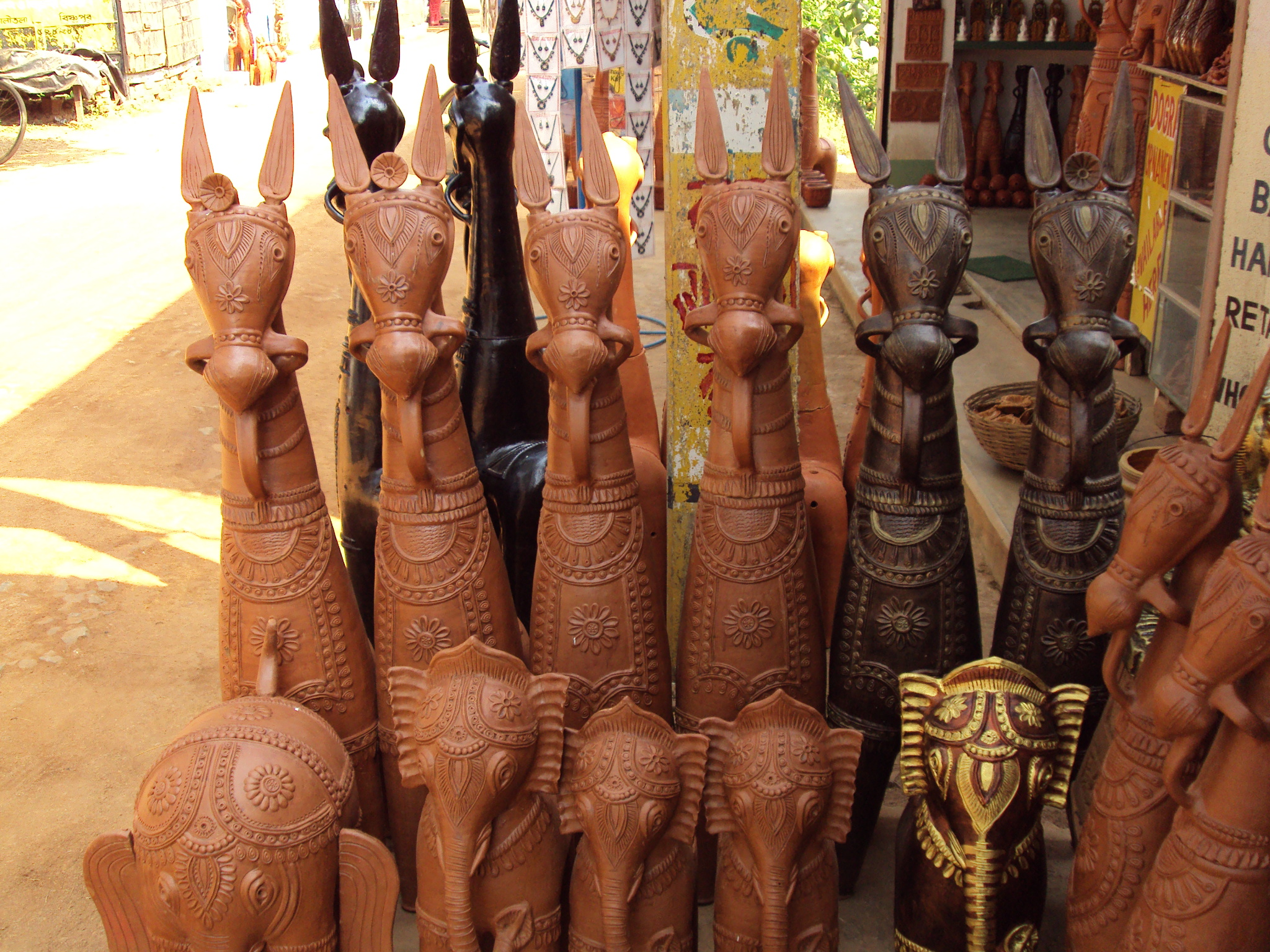
Terracotta horses and elephants in Bishnupur

Terracotta or clay craft has been the symbol of man's first attempt at craftsmanship, just as the potter's wheel was the first machine invented to use the power of motion for a productive purpose. However, its association with religious rituals has imbibed it with deeper significance. In West Bengal, terracotta traditions are found from the earliest times. They are symbols of fulfillment of aspirations of village folk. In order to cater to the commercial requirements of the modern global market, the village potter is often combining the traditional rural abstractions with refined urban tastes to show pieces of terracotta art.

==== Bankura Horse ====
In Bankura, potters create terracotta horses and elephants. Over the centuries they have moved away from a realistic presentation to a representational presentation. Potter-artists of different regions focused on different parts of the animal body in such a manner that representation of the same became more important than representation of the entire body of the animal.

==== Manasa chali ====
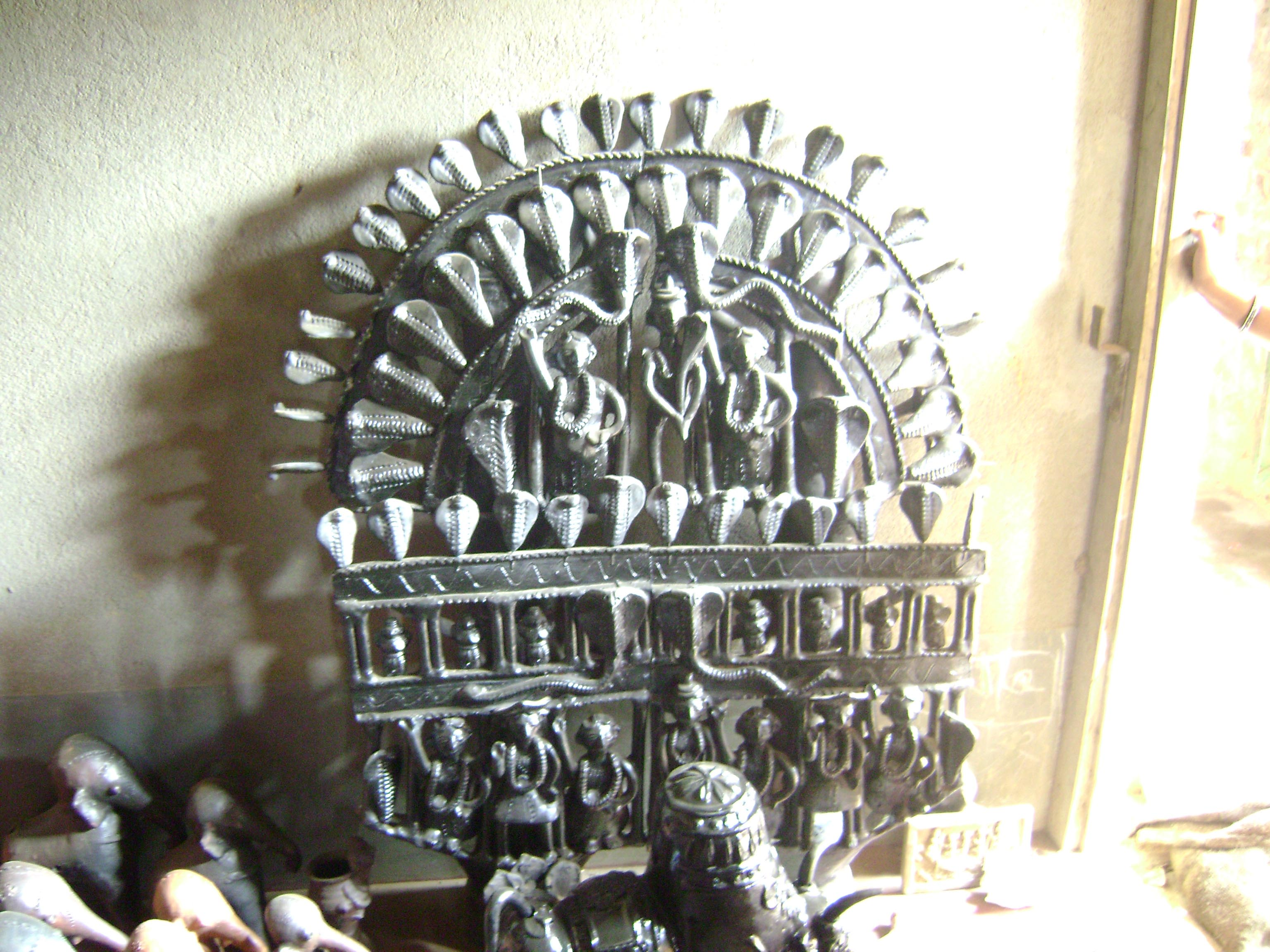
Manasa chali of Panchmura

Manasa chali is the idol of Goddess Manasa. It is a unique terracotta sculpture of Panchmura, West Bengal. Manasa chali has a small figure or a group of three figures in the middle, with rows of snake hoods fanning out in a half moon shape.

== Painting ==
=== Pattachithra ===
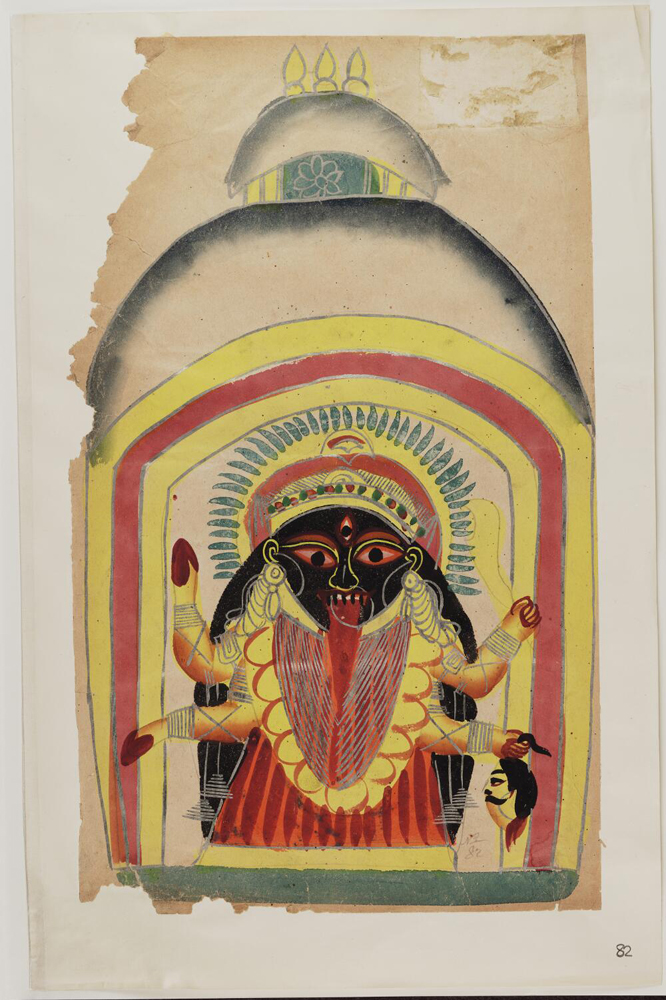
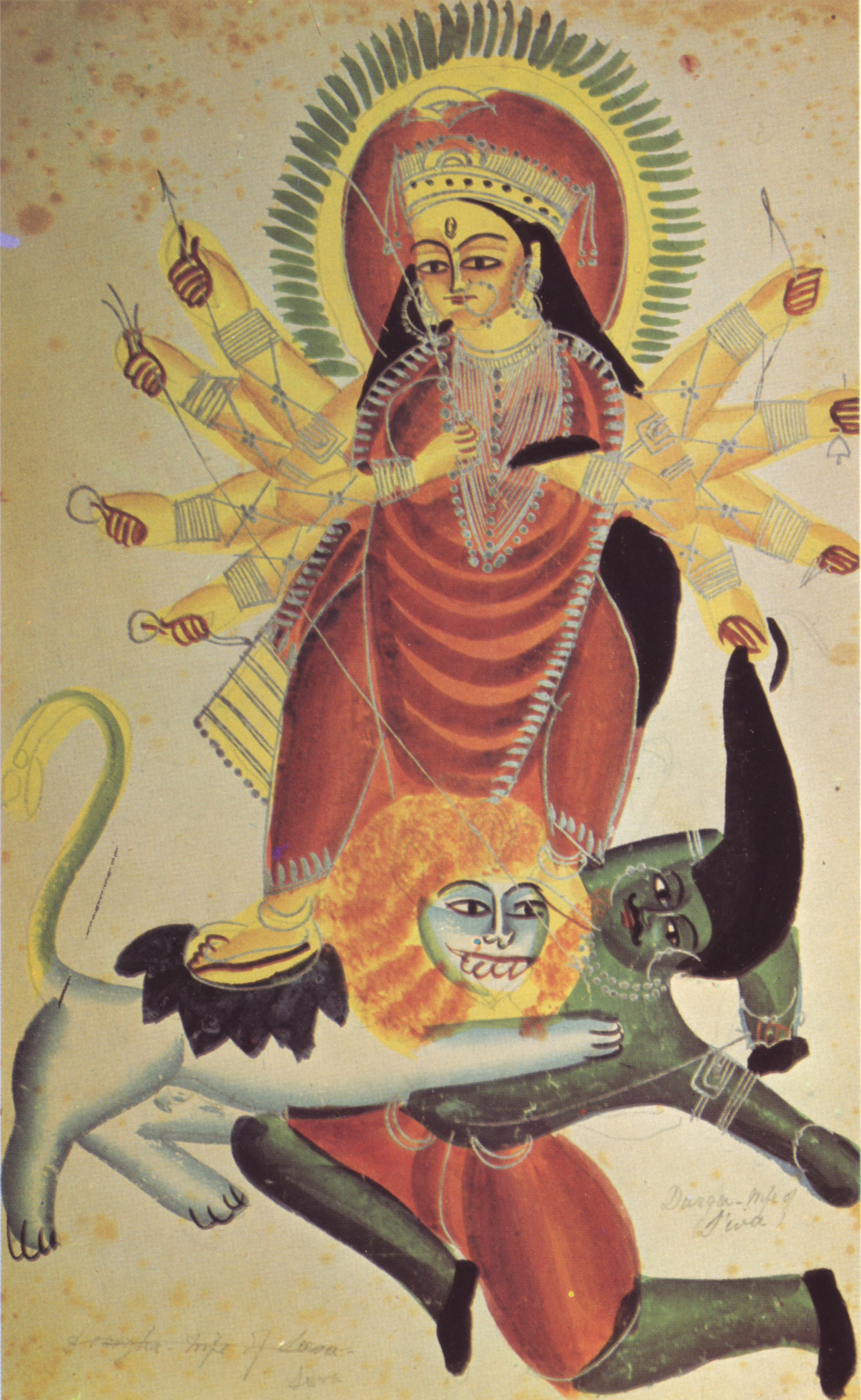
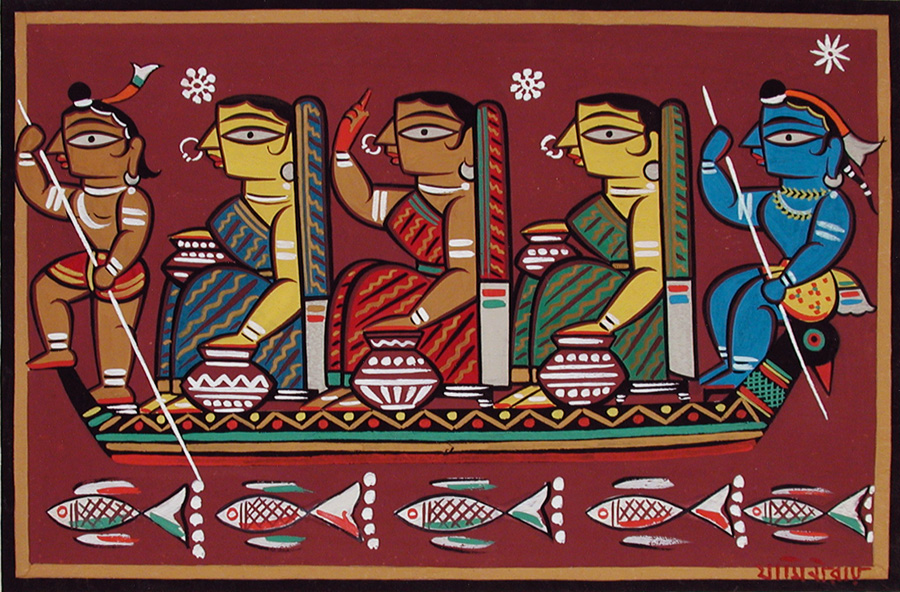
From top left to bottom right (a) Kalighat kali mata in Kalighat Patachitra; (b) Durga and Mahishasura, c.1880; (c) Jamini Roy boating painting as kalighat painting; (d) Manisha mata in Jamini Roy's painting.

Patachitra painting is a true cultural heritage of West Bengal. The patua community of West Bengal has an ancient history practicing the craft of patachitra. A quaint little village of Paschim Medinipur, Naya is home to around 250 patuas or chitrakars. Bengal patachitra has various aspects, like Chalchitra, Durga Pat, Medinipur Patachitra, kalighat Patachitra, mud wall painting etc. D. P. Ghosh mentioned different style of Bengal patachitra in the districts of West Bengal in his book Folk Art of Bengal.

The patachitra of different districts of West Bengal are characterized by many peculiarities in colour and design. The patachitra of Manbhum, now known as Purulia can easily be distinguished by their preference for one particular shade of burnt sienna relieved by white and yellow patches and densely packed composition. The seated figures of Dasaratha and Chand Sadagar of Medinipur crowning the Ramayana and Kamale-Kamini scrolls are monumental. In the scrolls of pot of Birbhum, Bankura and Burdwan preference for Indian red background usually found, the scrolls of Hooghly prefer a dark brown shade.

==== Chalchitra ====
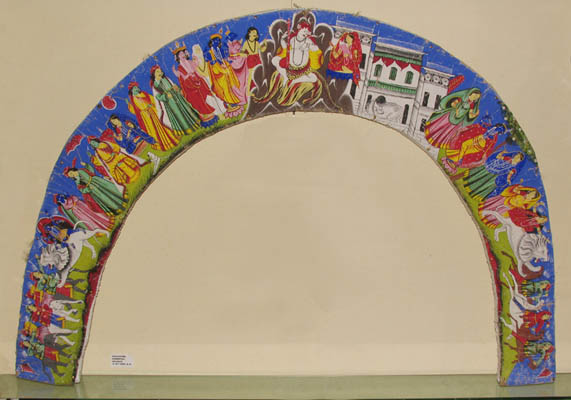
Chalchitra, a part of Bengal patachitra, referred to the background patachitra of the Durga Pratima

Chalchitra is a part of Bengal patachitra, It referred to the Debi Chal or Durga chala, the background of the Durga pratima or idol. Patua, the artists of Chalchitra called it Pata Lekha, meaning "the writing of Patachitra". 300–400 year old idols of Nabadwip Shakta Rash used Chalchitra as a part of Pratima. At one time, the use of Chalchitra had become faded, but now it has a great popularity. Chalchitra artist of Nabadwip, Tapan Bhattacharya said- It's good to see a lost painting coming back around.

==== Durga pot ====
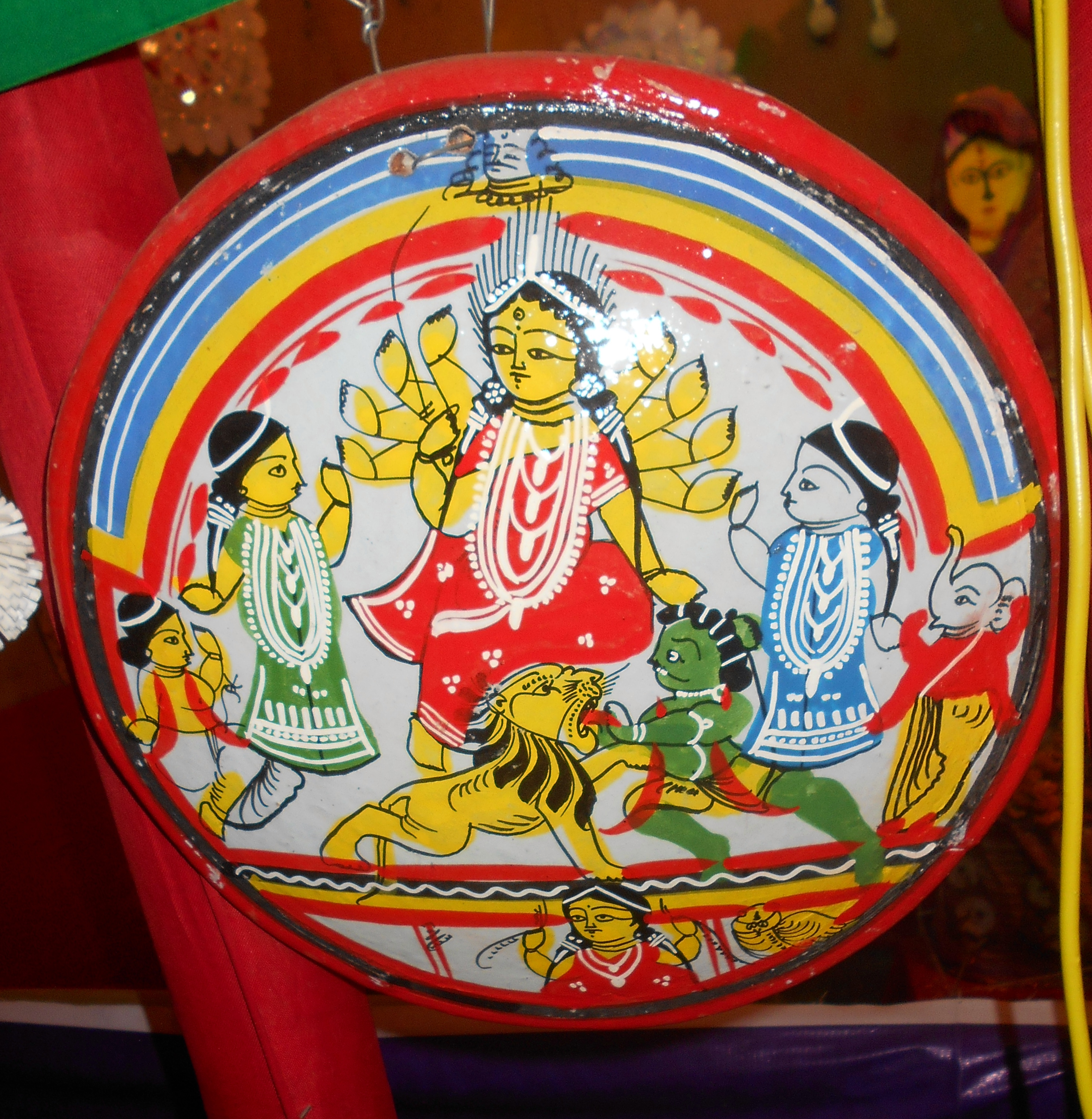
Durga sara, an aspect of Bengal Patachitra

Durga pot or Durga sara is recognised as the worshiped patachitra. It is worshiped in the Hatsarandi Sutradhar society of Birbhum district on Durga puja time. This type of patachitra is also worshiped is Katwa. Durga Pot has a semi-circular patachitra where patachitra of Durga is in the middle position. Ram, Sita, Shib, Nandi-Vringi, Brahma, Vishnu, Shumbha-Nishumbha are painted on this kind of Chalchitra. Krishnanager Rajrajeshwari Durga is seen to be uniquely noticed. In the middle of the Chalchitra, there is Panchanan Shib and Parvati is beside him, on one side there is Dasha-mahabidya and the other side, there is Dashabatar.

== Handicrafts ==
=== Clay art ===
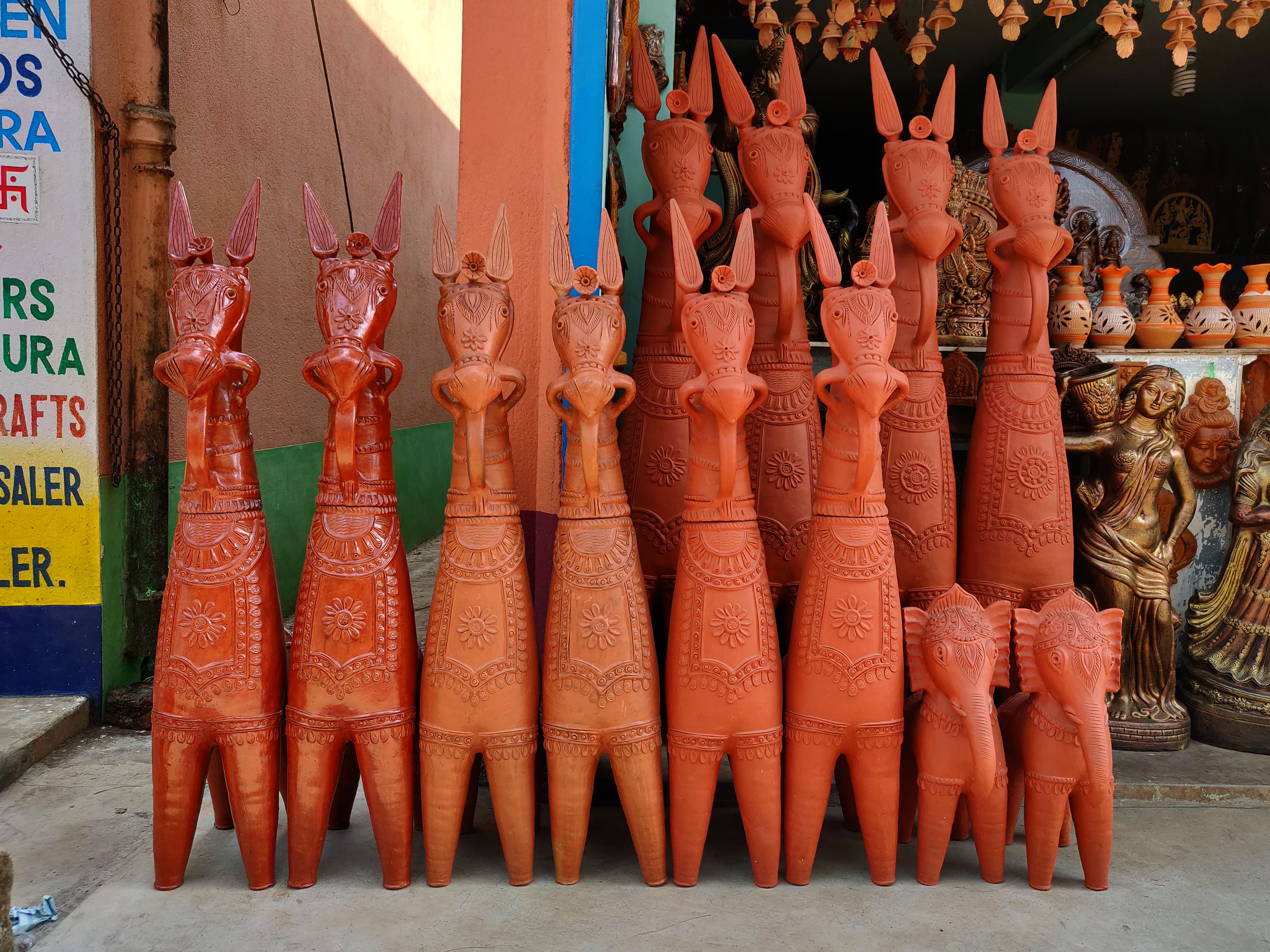
Bankura horses

Clay art has an indigenous history in West Bengal. Ghurni of Nadia district is very popular for making the clay idols. West Bengal has an ancient heritage of dolls. Dolls have been customarily crafted by women from the potter communities. Dolls made of soft clay and fired-clay are available all over West Bengal. Each of these dolls are made differently. The terracotta dolls of Panchmura, hingul and tusu dolls of Bishnupur, jo dolls of Midnapore, kanthalia dolls of Murshidabad, sasthi dolls of Coonoor, manasha pots of Dakshindari and Shiva heads of Nabadwip are very famous.

=== Kantha ===
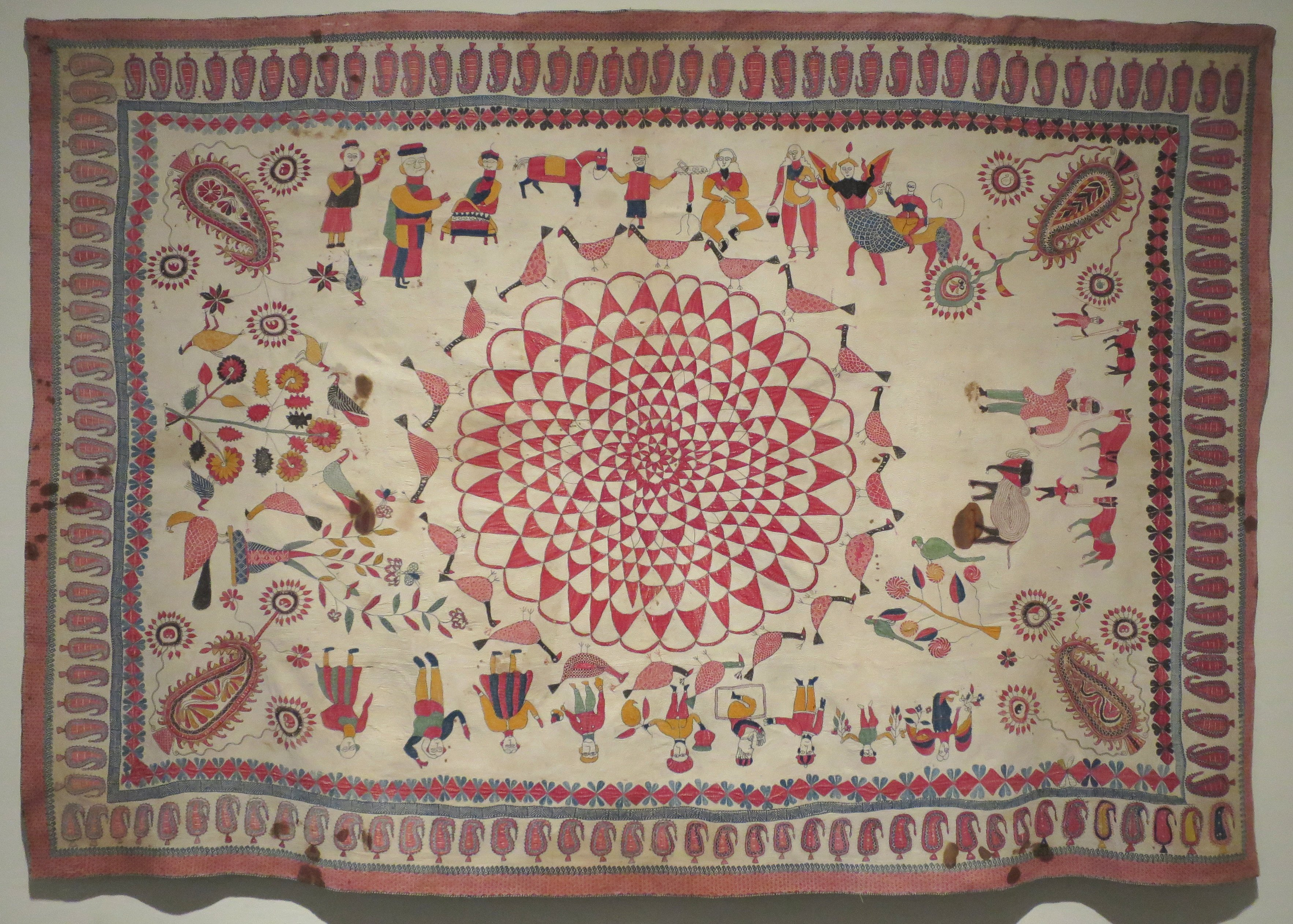
Kantha of Bengal

Kantha Stitch is one of the most popular handicrafts of Santiniketan in the Birbhum district of West Bengal, India.

=== Dokra ===
Dokra art is the most interesting and creative art of West Bengal. The Dokras are now dispersed over the western part of West Bengal in four districts namely Bankura, Purulia, Midnapore and Burdwan and are mainly concentrated in Bankura and partly in Purulia. The Dokra artisans of Bankura make various kinds of images and figurines of gods and goddesses, birds and animals, like Lakshmi, Lakshmi-Narayan, Shiva-Parvati flanked by Ganesh and Kartik, elephants, horses, owls, peacocks etc.

=== Wooden art ===
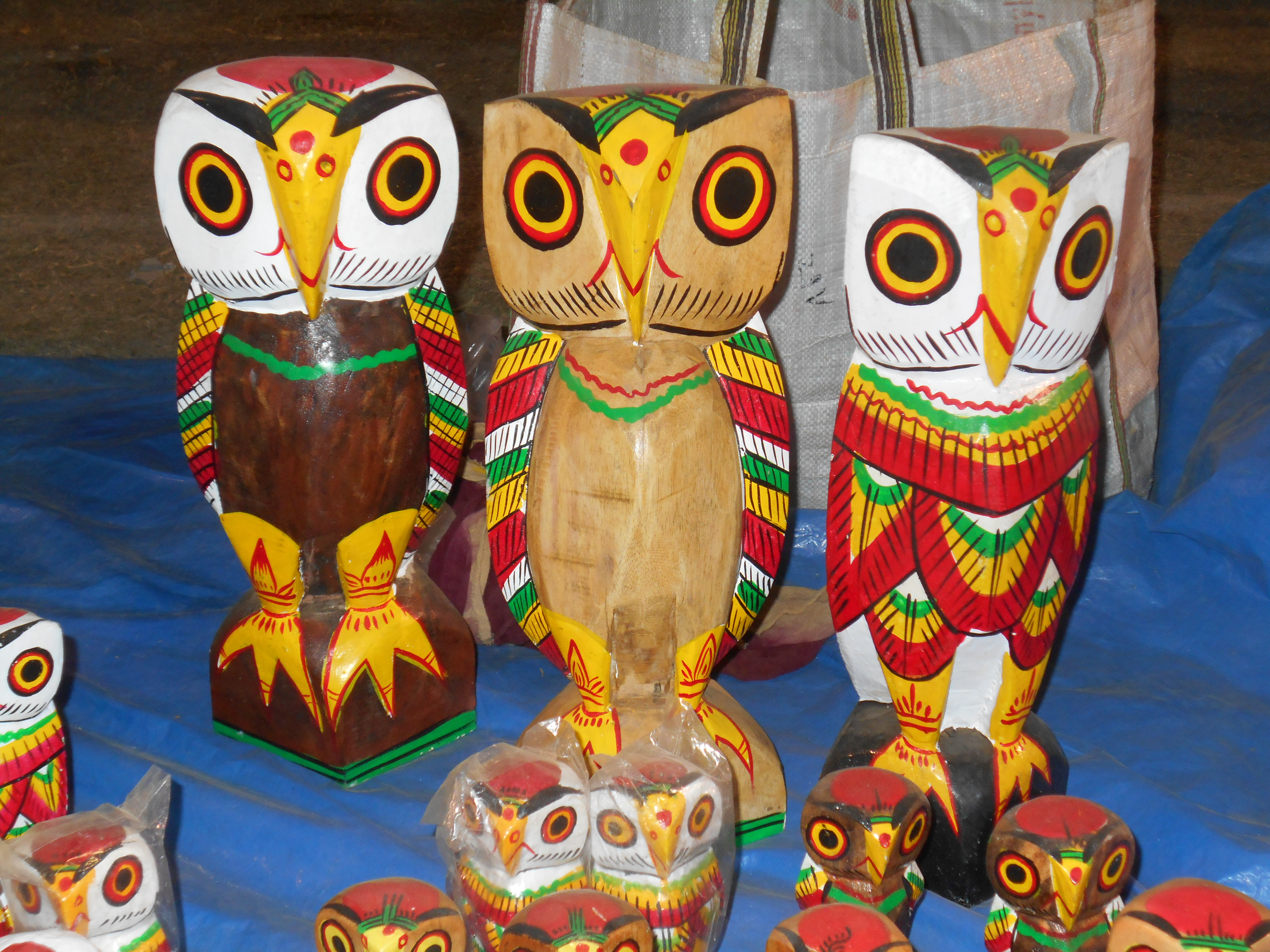
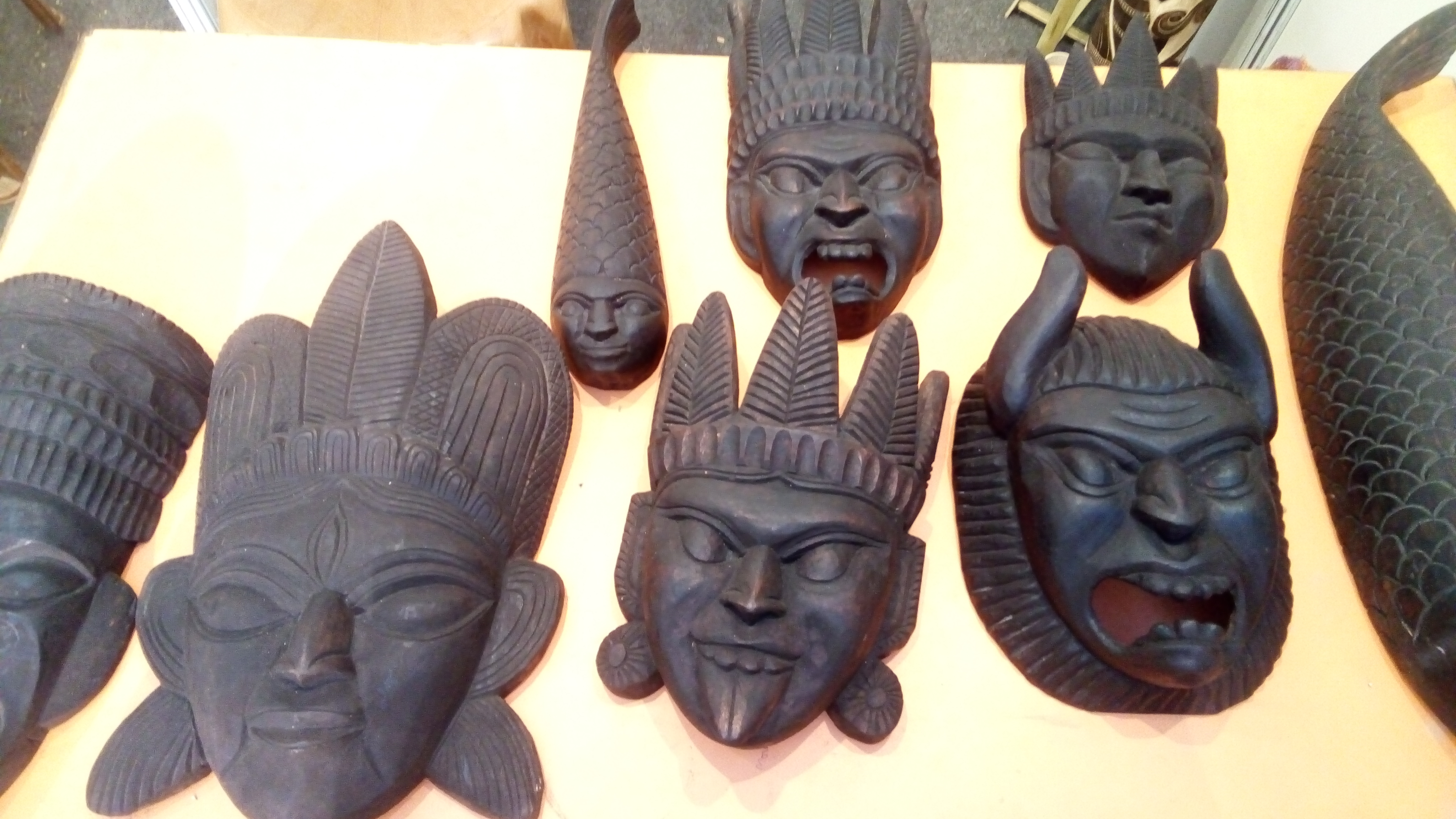
Left: Wooden owl of Natungram; Right: Wooden Gomira Masks of Dakshin Dinajpur.

Wooden art is a very old tradition of West Bengal. Wooden protima or idol is seen in Indian Museum. The art-making wooden dolls have been an age-old practice in West Bengal and Natungram is one of them. Natungram, a village of West Bengal makes wooden dolls like Gouranga, Krishna, Bor-Bou, Gour-Nitai, owl etc. Gomira masks of North and South Dinajpur in West Bengal are also made of wood.

=== Bamboo craft ===
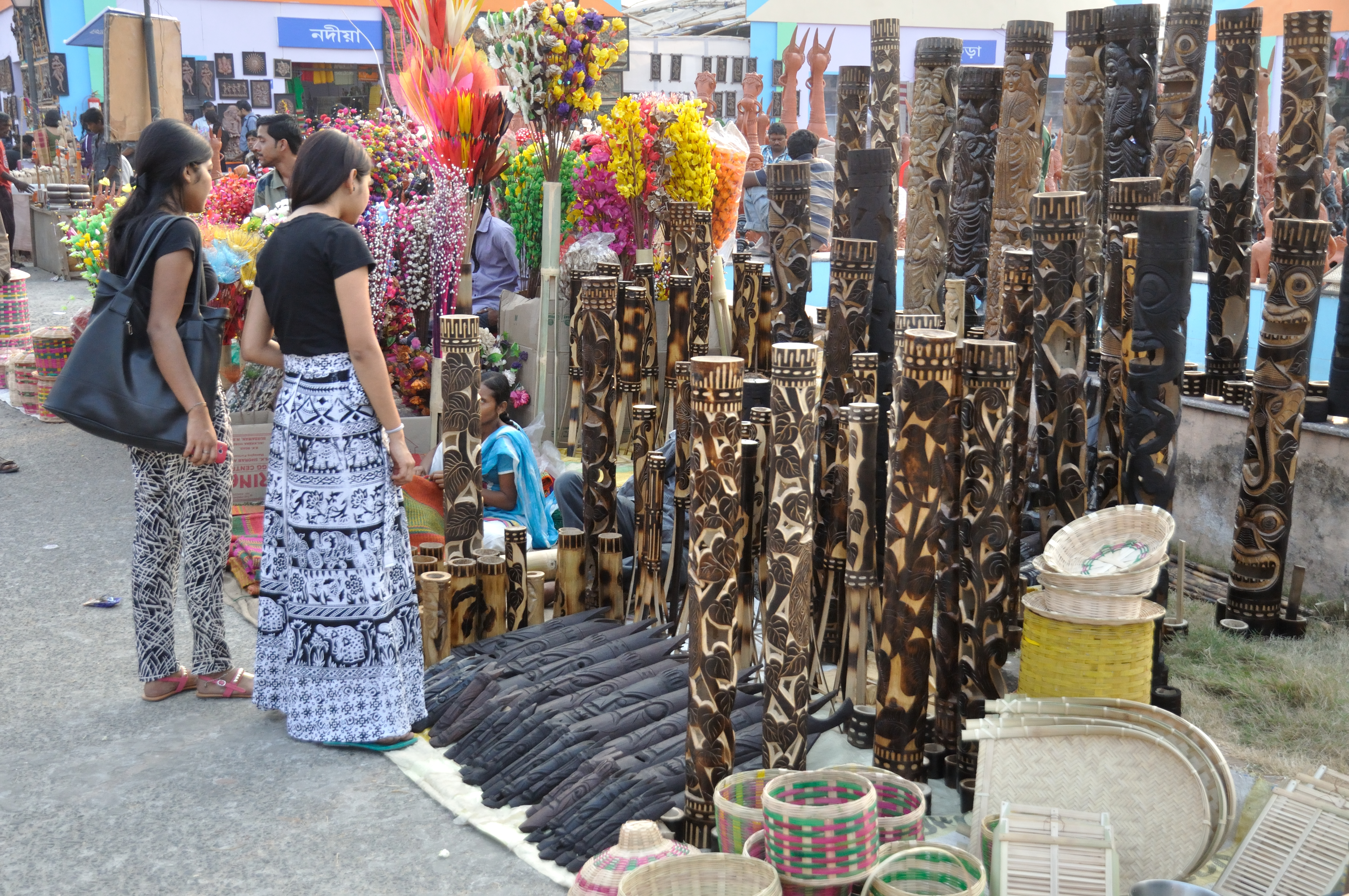
Bamboo Craft of West Bengal

Bamboo crafts are a very old and indigenous tradition in West Bengal. Different shapes and patterns of baskets are made using local traditions and techniques. In West Bengal, a tray-like bamboo basket is traditional. Different types of baskets, hand-held fan, sieves etc. are also made and painted with auspicious symbols and are used in marriage and other ceremonies.

== See also ==
- Culture of West Bengal
- Masks of West Bengal
