= Religious music =

Music intended for religious purpose

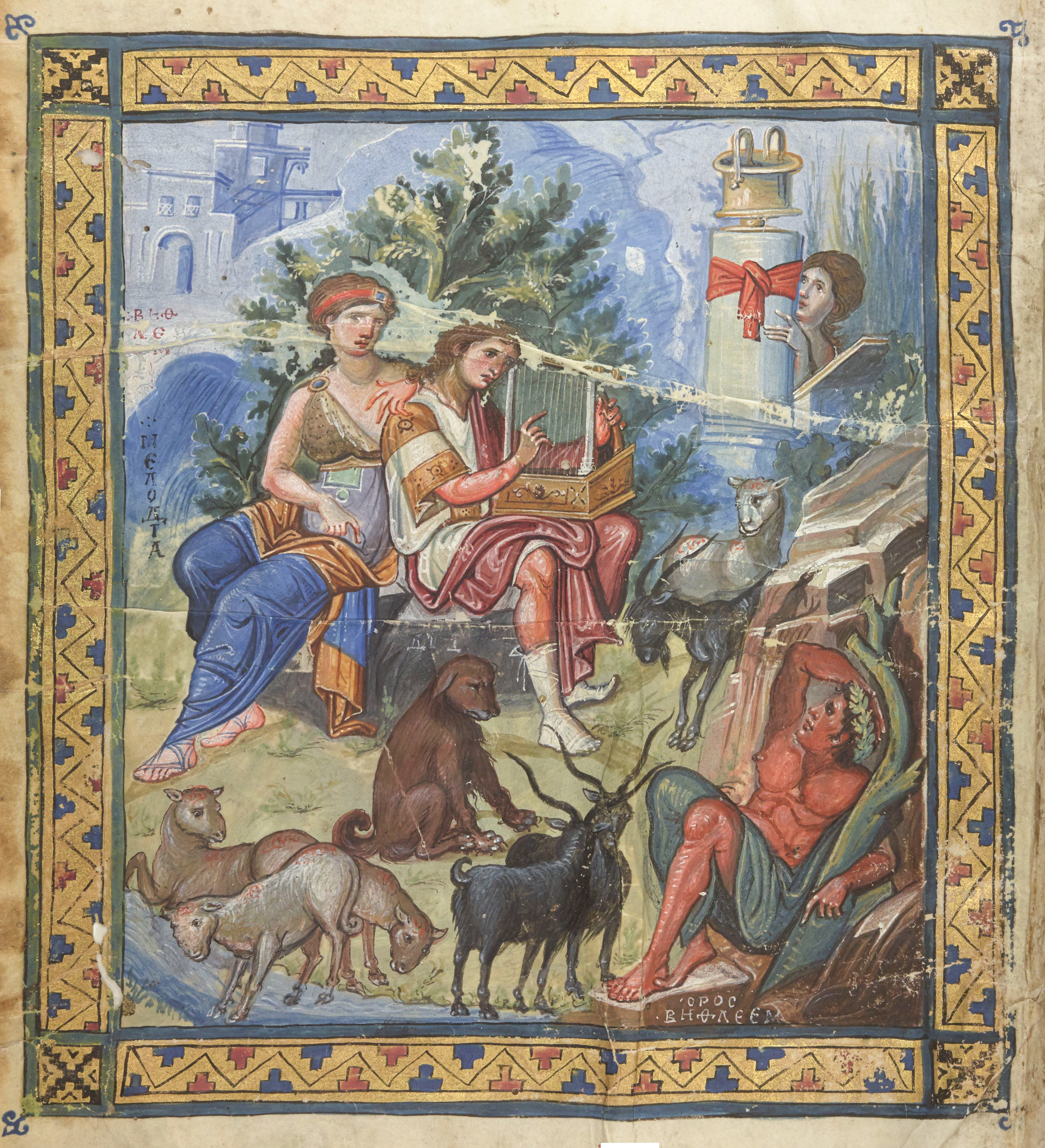
David playing his harp (unknown artist, c. 960). The book of Psalms, included in the Jewish and Christian scriptures, and said to have been written largely by David, is one of the earliest collections of sacred music, and still plays a role in the liturgies of the two religions.

Religious music (also sacred music) is a type of music that is performed or composed for religious use or through religious influence. It may overlap with ritual music, which is music, sacred or not, performed or composed for or as a ritual. Religious songs have been described as a source of strength, as well as a means of easing pain, improving one's mood, and assisting in the discovery of meaning in one's suffering. While style and genre vary broadly across traditions, religious groups still share a variety of musical practices and techniques.

Religious music takes on many forms and varies throughout cultures. Religions such as Islam, Judaism, and Sinism demonstrate this, splitting off into different forms and styles of music that depend on varying religious practices. Sometimes, religious music uses similar instruments across cultures. The use of drums (and drumming), for example, is seen commonly in numerous religions such as Rastafari and Sinism, while wind instruments (the horn, saxophone, trumpet and variations of such) can be commonly found in Islam and Judaism.

Throughout each religion, each form of religious music, within the specific religion, differs for a different purpose. For example, in Islamic music, some types of music are used for prayer while others are used for celebrations. Similarly, a variation like this is shared between many other religions.

Music plays a significant role in many religions. In some religions, such as Buddhism, music helps people calm their minds and focus before meditation. In Sikh music, known as Kirtan, the music helps people connect with the teachings of the religion and with God. Some other religions, such as Islam, use music to recite the word of their holy book. Some religions relate their music to non-religious musicians. For example, Rastafarian music heavily relates to reggae music. Religious music helps those of all religions connect with their faith and remember their religious values. are also included

== Buddhist music ==
Buddhist music is music created for or inspired by Buddhism and part of Buddhist art.

=== Buddhist chanting ===
Buddhist chanting is a form of musical verse or incantation, which is similar to religious recitations of other faiths. Buddhist chanting is the traditional means of preparing the mind for meditation, especially as part of formal practice (in either a lay or monastic context). Some Buddhist traditions also use chanting as a form of devotional practices.

Apart from chanting, in certain Buddhist traditions, offerings of music are given in honor of the Triple Gem, consisting of traditional music performed by specialists, or of the ritual music that accompanies the chanting. One significant example lies in Sri Lankan tradition, where a traditional ceremony is performed by drummers as a musical offering, also popularly known as "Sabda-Puja".

== Christian music ==
According to some scholars, the earliest music in the Christian Church came from Jewish worship music, with some additional Syriac influence. It is believed that this music lay somewhere between singing and speaking, or speaking with an understood ritual cadence. However, there is another opinion that the roots of early Christian music come from the early ascetic monastic orders.

=== Hymns ===
Christian music has diversified over time, reflecting both its centuries-old roots as well as more contemporary musical styles. Thousands of traditionally-styled songs of praise or worship, called "hymns" (from the Greek word hymnos meaning, "song of praise"), were written over hundreds of years. Eventually, these songs were compiled into books called "hymnals", from which pastors and congregants would read during Christian services – a practice that continues in many churches today.

Prior to the eighteenth century, Christian hymnals were published as standalone texts without accompanying musical scores. The first American hymnal with both text and song was published in 1831. In Europe, the Church of England did not officially allow hymns to be sung until 1820. Originally, hymns were sung by "lining out" the lyrics, meaning, the pastor would sing a line, and then the congregation would repeat it. This was done because, at that time, books were expensive, so it was economical to provide the pastor of a church with one copy from which everyone could sing.

=== Christian music in the modern era ===
Tribal Chak child in Bangladesh is singing Christian children song in Bangla.

Modern methods of publication have made hymnals much more accessible to the public today than previously. The practice of "lining out" the lyrics of hymns has therefore largely fallen away, although it continues to be practiced in some traditional churches. In the twentieth century, Christian music has developed to reflect the emergence of a diverse array of musical genres including rock, metal, pop, jazz, contemporary, rap, spiritual, country, blues, and gospel. The use of specific genres and styles of music in church services today varies across Christian denominations and according to the personal preference of pastors and church members. As of the late twentieth century, there has been a widespread preference in less traditional churches towards using contemporary music (particularly, "praise and worship" songs, which attempt to preserve the religious intent of hymns but use contemporary lyrics and a more modern musical sound instead) as well as gospel and spiritual music.

== Hindu music ==
Hindu music is music created for or influenced by Hinduism. It includes Carnatic music, Indian classical music, Hindustani classical music, Kirtan, Bhajan, Pann and other musical genres. Raagas are a common form of Hindu music in classical India. Vedas are also in Hindu music.

A bhajan is a Hindu devotional song, often of ancient origin. Bhajans are often simple songs in lyrical language expressing emotions of love for the Divine, whether for a single God and Goddess, or any number of divinities. Many bhajans feature several names and aspects of the chosen deity, especially in the case of Hindu sahasranamas, which list a divinity's 1008 names. Great importance is attributed to the singing of bhajans with Bhakti, i.e. loving devotion. "Rasanam Lakshanam Bhajanam" means the act by which we feel more closer to our inner self or God, is a bhajan. Acts which are done for the God is called bhajan.

Generally all music dedicated to goddess Mother Kali is called 'Shyama Sangeet' in Bengali. Two famous singers of this Bengali Shyama Sangeet are Pannalal Bhattacharya and Dhananjay Bhattacharya. Pannalal Bhattacharya's elder brother Prafulla Bhattacharya and middle brother Dhananjay Bhattacharya were the first music teachers of saint artist Pannalal Bhattacharya. Dhananjay Bhattacharya stopped singing devotional songs after finding devotional spirit in his brother Pannalal. However, after the demise of Pannalal Bhattacharya, he contributed again in Bengali music with many devotional songs by his sweet, melodious voice.

A raga or raag (IAST: rāga; also raaga or ragam; literally "coloring, tingeing, dyeing") is a melodic framework for improvisation akin to a melodic mode in Indian classical music.

== Islamic music ==
Islamic music comes in many forms. Each form is used for different purposes as one may be for prayers and complete focus towards Allah (God) and while the other is entertainment, however still including that religious aspect.

=== Prayer ===
Islamic prayer is a type of religious music that Muslims use when they pray and worship Allah. These prayers (in Arabic, prayer is Salah) that occur five times a day. These prayers are conducted by facing Mecca while standing, having both knees to the ground, and bowing. During prayer, recitations are usually of the Islamic holy book: the Quran. Throughout the day, in Mecca, these prayers connect the Muslim people through a series of melodic prayers that are often amplified throughout the city. In Islam, the implication of prayer, and in this case the Salah, is for ritual since it is believed to be the direct word of God that shall be performed as a collective, as well as individually.

=== Sufi music ===
Sufism, Islam's mystical dimension, advocates peace, tolerance, and pluralism, as well as music as a means of improving one's relationship with God. Sufi music aims to bring listeners closer to God. The deep urge to dissolve the physical realm and transcend into the spiritual universe, which occurs through the practice of listening to music, chanting, and whirling, and culminating in spiritual ecstasy, lies at the heart of Sufi lyrics. Because music is viewed as a tool for the believer to grow closer to the holy, sound and music are important to the basic experience of Sufism. Sufi music is therefore music created by and for the soul.

=== Naʽat ===
The other form of Islamic music is Naʽat. The word Naʽat has Arabic origins and translates to praise. A poem that praises the Islamic Prophet Muhammad is referred to as Naat (نعت) in Urdu. First Naʽat dates back to the era of Muhammad and was written in Arabic. It later spread throughout the world and reached various literatures including Urdu, Punjabi, Sindhi, Pashto, Turkish, Seraiki and more. Naʽat-Khuwan or Sana-Khuwan are known as those who recite Naʽat.

=== Instruments ===
- Chordophones, or stringed instruments
- Zornā and gayta as aerophones, or wind instruments
- Būq, or horn
- Nafīr, or long trumpet
- Idiophones, membranophones, tambourines, or frame drums

=== Melodic organization ===
Islamic music is monophonic, meaning it has only one melody line. Everything in performance is based on the refinement of the melodic line and the complexity of the beat. Although a simple arrangement of notes, octaves, fifths, and fourths, usually below the melody notes, may be used as ornamentation, the concept of harmony is absent. Microtonality and the variety of intervals used are two components that contribute to the melody's enrichment. As a result, the three-quarter tone, which was first used in Islamic music in the ninth or tenth centuries, coexists with bigger and smaller intervals. Musicians have a keen sensitivity to pitch variations, often altering even the perfect consonances, the fourth and fifth, somewhat.

=== History of Islamic prayer ===
Riccold De Monte, a famous travel writer, stated in the year 1228, "What shall I say of their prayer? For they pray with such concentration and devotion that I was astonished when I was able to see it personally and observe it with my own eyes." The origin of the art of prayer in all Abrahamic religions is to glorify God and the same goes for Islam. The Al Salat is the most widely used word to mean institutionalized prayer and is one of the oldest forms of prayer in Islam. Islamic prayer, traditions, and ideals had influence from these Abrahamic religions. The time of origination of Salah came from Muhammad in a cave as he began to worship Allah (God). It is believed that through this act of worship Mohammad interacted with the Abrahamic prophet Moses. Now these "prayers" come in the form of recitations of the Quran and poems written by prophets of the faith.

=== Spread of Islamic prayer ===
Besides the spread of Islam through Arabia by prophets, it spread through trade routes like the Silk Road and through conflicts of war. Through the Silk Road traders and members of the early Muslim faith were able to go to countries such as China and create mosques around 627 C. E. As men from the Middle East went to China they would marry these Asian women, which led to a spreading of the faith and traditions of Islam in multiplicities. The Crusades in the 9th and 10th centuries encouraged the spread of Islam through the invasions of Latin Christian soldiers and Muslim soldiers into each other's lands. The whole conflict began on the premises of a Holy Land and which group of people owned these lands that led to these foes invading their respective lands. As the religion itself spread so did its implications of ritual, such as prayer.

=== Relation of Islamic music to other cultures ===
Both musical theory and practice illustrate the relationship between Islamic and Western music. Many Greek treatises had been translated into Arabic by the 9th century. Greek musical texts were maintained in Arabic culture, and the majority of those that reached the West did so in their Arabic translations. Arab philosophers adopted Greek models and often improved on them. The Muslim conquest of Spain and Portugal, as well as the Crusades to the Middle East, introduced Europeans to Arabic theoretical works and thriving Islamic art music. Moreover, Arab invaders entered India as early as 711 AD, while Mongol and Turkmen forces eventually invaded the Middle East, bringing Islamic and Far Eastern music together. There are parallels between India's and the Middle East's modal systems, as well as some cosmological and ethical ideas of music.

== Jewish music ==
Jewish music is the shared melody of religious Jewish communities. Its influence spreads across the globe, originating in the Middle East, where music principles differ from those of the Western world, emphasizing rhythmic development over harmony. There are three sections into which Jewish music can be separated: Ashkenazic music, Sephardic music, and Mizrahi music.

=== Ashkenazic ===
The most prevalent form of Ashkenazic music is Klezmer, which is typically sung in Yiddish. Klezmer often refers to the Jewish instrumentalist, specifically focusing on Ashkenazic melodies and music; this genre was common among European Jewish traveling musicians. Klezmer music was and continues to be used primarily at Jewish social gatherings. Weddings, however, are the main venue for this genre. Klezmer fundamentally dates back to the nineteenth century; there are a multitude of Klezmer musicians whose ages range from 50 to 80, but there is evidence that dates it back to centuries prior. Klezmer music features a myriad of various instruments that can be seen in many modern forms of music today, such as violin, drums and cymbals, accordion, cello, clarinet, and saxophone.

=== Sephardic ===
Sephardic music encompasses music that is of Mediterranean origin, including Spain, Turkey, and Greece. Sephardic music is typically sung in Ladino, or a Judeo-Spanish dialect. It demonstrates music styles that are reminiscent of Mediterranean rhythms and melodies. This genre touches on romance, life, and religious traditions, and is typically associated with women and women's singing. Women tend to sing these songs with no additional harmony or instruments. Sephardic music originates from Jews that lived in medieval Spain and Portugal, and it spread following Sephardic Jews' expulsion from Spain and Portugal in the late 15th century.

=== Mizrahi ===
Mizrahi music contains elements of Middle Eastern, European, and North African music, traditionally sung in Hebrew. Mizrahi Jews are communities of Jewish people from the Middle East and North Africa. This style of music was widely unpopular, with Ashkenazic music being prevalent in most Jewish communities. This style, however, grew in popularity in the 1970s. Mizrahi music demonstrates many Arabic elements, showcasing instruments such as the oud, kanun, and the darbuka. Other instrumental elements include guitar, vocal trills, and electronic instruments.

== Neopagan music ==
Neopagan music is music created for or influenced by modern Paganism. It has appeared in many styles and genres, including folk music, classical music, singer-songwriter, post-punk, heavy metal and ambient music.

== Rastafarian music ==
=== Origin ===
Rastafari appeared in Jamaica in the 1930s as an energetic and spirited movement. It is classed as a religion, by non-rastafarians, due to the principles the movement is built upon. Nevertheless, some Rastafarians viewed their movement as a way of life for their supporters. The Rastafarian way of life represents the identity recreation of being African. As the movement spread to South Africa and Jamaica, this caused confusion about what Rastafarians believed due to the combination of other ideologies and religions being incorporated into the religion. However, Christianity being the structure for the religion, interpreted parts of the Bible differently

Rastafarian music is persistently tied to reggae music, an earlier form of Jamaican music. As reggae continues to be spread throughout the world, creators are beginning to change the original reggae sound and Rastafarian ideology incorporated. Various reggae songs representing Rastafarian culture through lyrics, themes, and symbolism.

=== Rastafarian drumming ===
Earlier origins of Rastafarian music connected to the high usage of drums. The play of drums represents a form of communication between Rastafarian gods and their supporters. Drumming would commonly take place during a reasoning session, the gathering of Rastafarians to chant, pray, and sing in the home of a Rasta or a community center. Count Ossie, a Rastafarian drum player revealed various rhythmic patterns after noticing the escalated sensation of drumming during prayer. Incorporation of the drums in spiritual sessions stems from the African drumming and Africans and Rastafarians seek for cultural identity. Majority of slaves not having religious belief, coincidentally Rastafarians having no music led to the integration of the groups. This increased the spread of the Rastafarian religion as slaves gained a new religion, and Rastafarians enjoyed Buru music, Afro-Jamaican rhythm music.

=== Expansion ===
The global spread of the Rastafarian movement has been significantly facilitated by reggae music, attracting a diverse following worldwide. This has been especially resonant among communities experiencing social and economic hardships, providing them with a source of identity, pride, and resistance against perceived oppressive systems.

The Rastafarian Bob Marley was a significant reason for the spread of Rastafarian music around the world. Through religious messages portrayed in his lyrics, the religion was beginning to become more popular. Marley expressing his opinions on political matters, justice, and peace, increased awareness of the unique beliefs of Rastafari. North Americans were able to identify distinctive features of Rastafarians such as dreadlocks, manner of speaking, and the consumption of marijuana. Marley remains an essential figure within Rastafarian music, and Nyabinghi drums continue to be played at his museum.

== Shamanic music ==
Shamanic music is music played either by actual shamans as part of their rituals, or by people who, whilst not themselves shamans, wish to evoke the cultural background of shamanism in some way.

== Shintō music ==
Shintō music (神楽) is ceremonial music for Shinto (神道) which is the native religion of Japan.

== Sikh music ==
Sikh music or Shabad kirtan is Kirtan-style singing of hymns or Shabad from the Sri Guru Granth Sahib Ji, the central text of Sikhism. Its development dates back to the late 16th century as the musical expression of mystical poetry, accompanied by a musical instrument rabab. All the Sikh Gurus sang in the then-prevalent classical and folk music styles, accompanied by stringed and percussion instruments. The Gurus specified the raag for each hymn in the Sikh sacred scripture, the Guru Granth Sahib.

=== Raag ===
The Sikh Guru, Sri Guru Granth Sahib Ji, consists of shabads, or passages, written by Sikh Gurus and various other saints and holy men. Before each shabad, a raag is assigned. the raag provides a guideline for how the shabad should be sang. There are 31 raags in Sri Guru Granth Sahib Ji. A raag is a specific set of rules on how to construct a certain melody. Sri Guru Granth Sahib Ji is composed with different raags to match the shabads and teachings of the Sikh Gurus and various holy people.

=== Instruments ===
The Gurus also created numerous musical instruments including the Dilruba, the Sarangi, the Esraj and the Jori.

==== Rabab ====
One of the earliest Sikh instruments to be used was the Rabab. When Guru Nanak Dev Ji, the first Guru of the Sikhs would travel to different areas, his companion Bhai Mardana would always bring a rebab. They would sing Sikh shabads to the residents of each village and Bhai Mardana would play his rebab. In this way, Guru Nanak Dev Ji started the singing of Sikh kirtan.

==== Jori ====
Another Sikh instrument is the Jori. The word jori means pair and the jori is a pair of two drums. The musician playing the jori will use one hand per drum whilst playing the instrument. The instrument was created during the time of the fifth Sikh Guru, Guru Arjun Dev Ji. Originally, one of the most popular drums used in South Asia in the 16th century was the Mardang. The Mardang was a singular drum with two sides played simultaneously. In the court of Guru Arjun Dev Ji there were two musicians, Sata and Balwand, who decided to create a new instrument by splitting the Mardang in half. This created two separate drums that would be played simultaneously and would be able to be tuned individually.

==== Taus ====
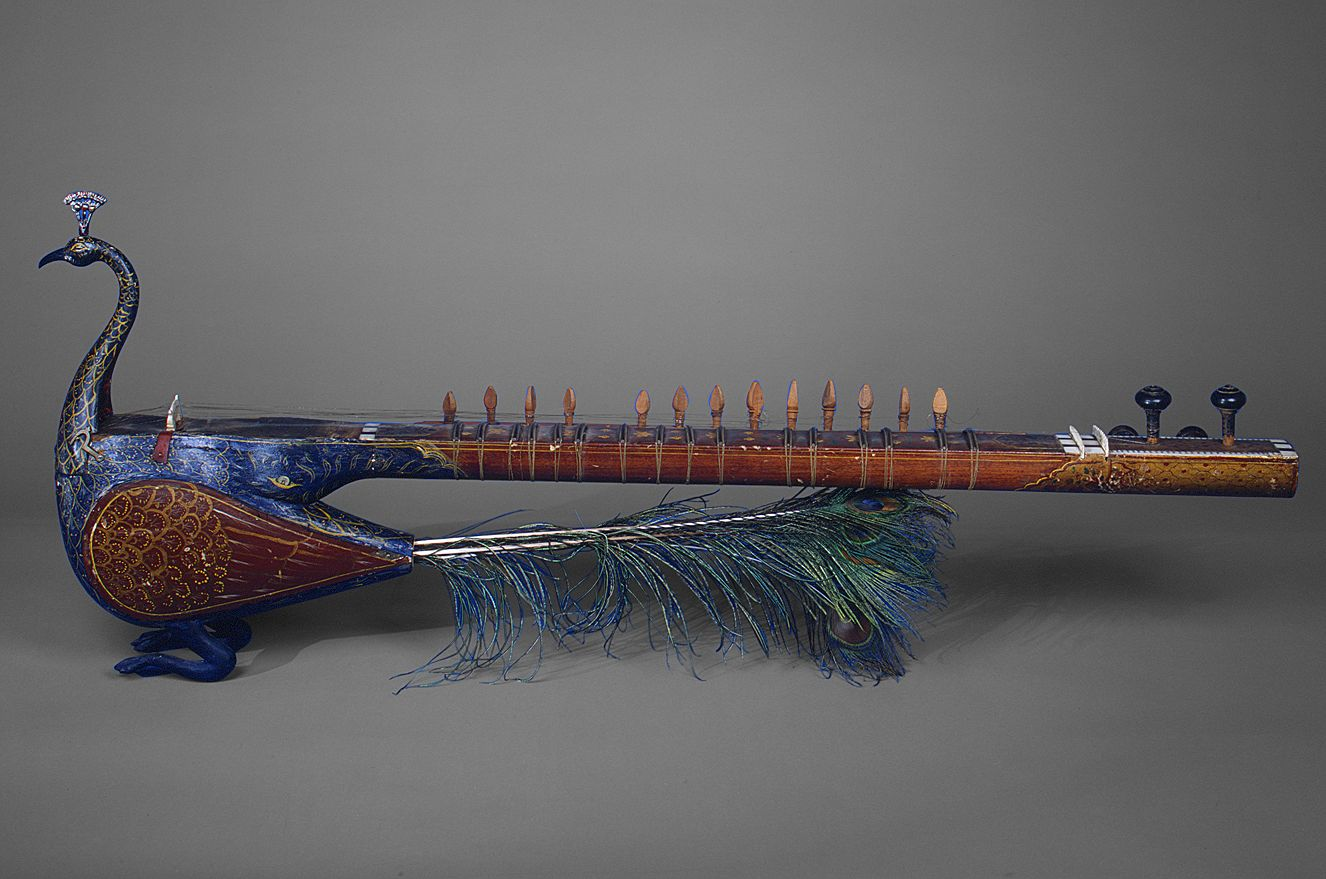
Image of a taus

One distinctive Sikh instrument is the taus. The head of the instrument is shaped like a peacock. The 10th Guru of the Sikhs, Guru Gobind Singh Ji, named the instrument "taus" as the word is Persian for peacock. This instrument was originally created by Guru Hargobind Sahib Ji. It is significantly larger than other Sikh instruments. It is played with a bow and has 28–30 strings, allowing the instrument to communicate an array of emotions and properly play the raags of Sri Guru Granth Sahib Ji.

==== Harmonium ====
After the British invaded and colonized India in the 19th century, they introduced some of their instruments to the Sikh Community. One of these instruments was the Harmonium.

==== Tabla ====
The second instrument was the Tabla. The tabla is meant to accompany the singer and the harmonium in Sikh kirtan.

== Sinism (Korean shamanism) music ==
Muak (무악) or Musok Eumak (무속 음악), is the traditional Korean shamanistic music performed at and during a shamanistic ritual, the Gut (굿).

=== Origin ===
Geographically, the Korean peninsula can be divided into five shaman music areas based on musical dialects and instrumentation: the central, northwestern, eastern, southwestern, and Jeju Island areas.

=== Types of Sinism (Korean shamanism) music ===
==== Sinawi (시나위) ====
Sinawi is a form of Korean improvisational ensemble music believed to evolve from the Jeolla province in southwestern Korea.

==== Sanjo (산조) ====
Sanjo (music) is a style of Korean traditional music produced with improvised instrumental solos.

=== Gut (굿) ===
Gut (굿) is the name for a shamanic ritual. During a ritual, there is a table with sacrificial offerings, known as gutsang (굿상), for the gods. Throughout the ritual, the dramatic performances or gut nori (굿 노리) are accompanied by music, song, and dance. Gut can be categorized into private and village rituals. Private rituals include well-wishing rituals, healing rituals, underworld entry rituals and shamanic initiation rituals. The purpose of village rituals are to maintain peace and promote communal unity, where the name of each ritual vary by region. In modern Korean society, the most common forms of gut are shamanic initiation rituals and rituals for the dead.

==== Mudang (무당) ====
In contemporary South Korea, the shaman is known as the mudang (무당). The mudang is usually a woman and takes on the role as a mediator between spirits or gods and humans. Mudangs can be categorized into sessûmu (세쑤무) and kangshinmu (강신무). Sessûmu are mudang that inherit the right to perform shamanic rituals while kangshinmu are mudang who are intiatied into their status through a ceremony.

=== Instruments ===
The instruments that are used in Korean shamanic rituals are called Muakgi (무악기). These instruments include:

- Janggu (장구), Hourless drum
- Bara (바라), Small cymbals
- Piri (피리), Reed flute
- Jeotdae (젓대) / Daegeum (대금), Large bamboo flute
- Haegeum (해금), Two-stringed zither
- Kkwaenggwari (꽹과리), Small gong
- Buk (북), Small drum

=== Contemporary influence ===
In the Korean contemporary dance scene, there are many productions portraying significant elements from traditional Korean shaman culture.

== Taoist music ==
Taoist music is the ceremonial music of Taoism. The importance of music in Taoist ceremony is demonstrated by revealing how central beliefs are reflected through elements of music such as instrumentation and rhythm. The principal belief of the Yin Yang is reflected in the categorization of musical tones. The two main tones of Taoist chanting are the Yin Tone and the Yang Tone. Taoist music can be found in every ceremonial occasion, including "Five Offerings" and the "Ode of Wishing for Longevity."

=== Instruments ===
The instruments used in Taoist rituals are called Faqi (). These instruments include:

- Magical sword
- Water jar
- Muyu
- Dangzi
- Yinqing, Guiding chime

== Zoroastrian music ==
Zoroastrian music is a genre of music that accompanies Zoroastrian traditions and rites.

== See also ==
- Choir music
- Cantor
- Gospel music
- Islamic music
- Liturgical music
- Music and politics
- Peyote song
- Santo Daime hymns
- Secular music
- Spiritual (music)
- World Sacred Music Festival
