= Banshari Lahiri =

- Born: 1932 (age 93–94); Sirajganj British India (now Bangladesh)
- Genres: Hindustani Classical Music
- Occupation: singer
- Years active: 1947 – present
- Labels: Megaphone Records

Banshari Lahiri (née Banshari Chakraborty) (born 1932) is a Bengali singer who was well-versed in Indian classical music and Shyama Sangeet. She was the mother of composer Bappi Lahiri, the Disco King.

== Biography ==
Banshari Chakraborty was born to Dr. Annada Govinda Chakraborty in Sirajganj, a city in British India, now Bangladesh. She learned music from her father.

== Musical career ==
In 1947, Megaphone Records released the first record of two songs, whose lyricist and composer were Gauriprasanna Mazumder and Aparesh Lahiri respectively. With the sincere cooperation of Kamal Ghosh, owner of Megaphone Company and Aparesh Lahiri, Banshari gradually established herself in the world of Bengali music. Banshari married Aparesh. Banshari also released many popular songs with Aparesh Lahiri. In addition to basic songs, Banshari sang several songs in Bengali and Hindi films as a playback singer. Lastly, Banshari was involved in the gharana of Ragas and Indian classical music. Banshari Lahiri participated in Mahishasurmardini, a widely popular early Bengali special dawn radio programme of All India Radio (AIR) that started in 1931, several times before 1972. Banshari's musical career came to an end in 1972 when she moved to Mumbai with her son Bappi Lahiri.

Some of the most well-known songs sung by Banshari are:

- Ichhamoyee Tara Go Tor Ichha ke Bujhte Pare - Shyama Sangeet
- Nahi Mane jiyara Hamar - in the film Subhash Chandra released in 1964
- Ankho Me Tum
- Bhool Gaye Hum Sab Kuch - in the 1979 film 'Tere Pyaar Mein'
