= Pannalal Bhattacharya =

- Born: 1 January 1930; Bally, Bengal Presidency, British India
- Origin: India
- Died: 27 March 1966 (aged 36) Calcutta, West Bengal, India
- Genre: Shyama Sangeet
- Occupation: Singer
- Years active: 1947–1966

Pannalal Bhattacharya (1 January 1930 – 27 March 1966) was an Indian singer of Bengali music. Most of the songs he sang were written by Ramprasad Sen and Kamalakanta Bhattacharya, both of whom were Shakta poets of Bengal. He was the younger brother of Prafulla Bhattacharya, the music director of the golden age of Bengali songs, and renowned singer Dhananjay Bhattacharya. He was eight years younger than his elder brother Dhananjay Bhattacharya. He developed a special style of singing, Shyama Sangeet, that continues to be used. He committed suicide at the age of 36.

== Early life ==
Very little is known about his background. Even the Bengali 'Cąritavidan' does not provide adequate information about his early life or childhood. He was born in Bally, Barendrapara, Howrah and spent most of his life there.

They were Barendra Brahmins. The descendants of this Bhaduri family were King Ganesh and Udayanacharya Bhaduri. 'The Levitating Saint' - Bhaduri Mahasaya- Maharshi Nagendranath's father was Parboti charan Bhaduri. Parboti charan Bhaduri's brother Kalicharan Bhaduri was the father of the renowned sitar and Esraj player Surendranath Bhattacharya. Surendranath was awarded the title of Bhattacharya. So, instead of Bhaduri, Surendranath Bhattacharya used surname 'Bhattacharya'. Three sons of Surendranath Bhattacharya were three legends of the Bengali music world - music director Prafulla Bhattacharya, renowned singer Dhananjay Bhattacharya and Pannalal Bhattacharya.

== Career ==
Pannalal started singing in 1947, at the age of 17, with another renowned musician, Sanat Sinha. His elder brother Prafulla Bhattacharya took them both to a program, where none of them were allowed to sing because of the immaturity in their voices. They encountered the same problem at His Master's Voice. They got their first break in Megaphone. At first Pannalal sang modern Bengali songs, until Bishwanath Kumar, a friend of Sanat Sinha signed him for his first hit Shyama sangeet, "Aamar sadh na mitilo aasha na purilo, sokoli phuraye jay ma..." (None of my desires were fulfilled, nor my hopes have come true, O mother...). This rendition is now acclaimed as a classic in Bengal. However, "Aamar Sadhna mitilo" wasn't Pannalal's first Shyama sangeet record. His earlier and popular songs include "Aamar Mayer Paye Jaba Hoye", "Tui naki Ma Dayamayee", Tui je Kemon Dayamayee", "Sakali Tomari Ichha", "Amay De Ma Pagal Kore", "Muchiye De Ma Aamar a Duti Nayan", "Moneri basona shyama" among others.

Pannalal Bhattacharya learned music from Prafulla Bhattacharya and Dhananjay Bhattacharya.

Two songs sung by Pannalal Bhattacharya - 'Bhule Gecho Jadi' and 'Sundar Tumi Bhalobasho' - composed by Prafulla Bhattacharya became very popular. Even today, without these songs sung by Pannalal Bhattacharya, composed by Prafulla Bhattacharya in Shyama Sangeet - 'Jenechei Jeenechei Tara', 'O Ma Kali Chirkaler', 'Kotha Bhabadara', 'Tui Je Kemen Dayamoyi', 'Bhebe Dekh Mon Keu Karo Nai', 'Amay De Ma Pagal Kore' - the motherly devotion of Bengalis will not complete.

Pannalal developed a special style of singing, that with devotion. His distinct voice and a spirit filled with devotion have touched the hearts of countless devotees of Mother Kali across Bengal. He became a great devotee of goddess Kali and always remained engrossed in her thoughts. Pannalal and his elder brother Dhananjay Bhattacharya, another eminent singer of Shyama Sangeet, wanted to please Kali by offering her their songs.

The innermost realm of devotion was reached by him by singing Shyama Sangeet. He used to worship the idol of Goddess Kali installed in his house in Bally, Barendra Para. But even then, Pannalal could never be satisfied with himself or his songs.

This was the reason why he used to cry as a child and call Goddess Kali. Not only when he sang Shyama Sangeet, but also when he taught his students to sing, he would often express his emotions. His whole body would tremble, he would sweat, and tears would flow from his eyes.

Shibani Bhattacharya Bandyopadhyay, the daughter of his elder brother Prafulla Bhattacharya, portrayed the state that Pannalal Bhattacharya frequently encountered while teaching music -

"Whenever my Choto Kaka was in that state while teaching music, I would get up. I would go and play. My Choto Kaka wouldn't even notice."

In the last years, Pannalal looked morose for some unknown reason. It is claimed by some that Dhananjay, received the divine grace of Mother Kali, the Exalted, but Pannalal didn't, and so he committed suicide on 27 March 1966, in his house on Kakulia Road. He died only at a very young age of 36, but he has claimed a paramount position in the hearts of thousands of lakhs of Kali devotees since his first Shyama Sangeet performance.

== Personal life ==
Pannalal was married and cared well for his family until his death in 1966. After his death, his elder brother Dhananjay bore the responsibility of Pannalal's family, along with his own.

== See also ==
- Dhananjay Bhattacharya
