= Shyama Sangeet =

Genre of Bengali devotional songs

Shyama Sangeet (Bengali: শ্যামা সঙ্গীত) is a genre of Bengali devotional songs dedicated to the Hindu goddess Shyama or Kali which is a form of supreme universal mother-goddess Durga or Parvati. It is also known as Shaktagiti or Durgastuti.

Shyama Sangeet appeals to the common man because it is a musical representation of the relationship of eternal and sublime love and care between the mother and her child. It is free of the common rituals of worship and also the esoteric practice of the Tantra.

== Origin ==
During the 12th-13th centuries when Shaktism grew in Bengal, it inspired a number of poets to compose poems on Kali. Mukundarāma, known as Kavikaṅkaṇ or 'gem of poets, ' wrote his chief poem, the epic Chaṇḍī, in 1589. Towards the middle of the 18th century, the poet Ramprasad Sen instilled new life into it and turned it into a distinct genre of Bengali songs.

Ramprasad was succeeded by number of composers like Kamlakanta Bhattacharya (1772–1821), Maharaja Harendra Narayan (1783-1839), Maharaja Shivendra Narayan (1839-1847), Rasikchandra Ray (1820–1893), Ramchandra Datta (1861–1899), Nilakantha Mukhopadhyaya (1842–1911) and Bhaba Pagla (1902–1984). In modern times both Rabindranath Tagore and Kazi Nazrul Islam have composed poems of Shyama Sangeet genre.

The term 'Shyama' refers to the skin color of Kali (usually depicted in black or dark blue).

== Divisions ==
Shyamasangeet can be divided into two streams: devotional or metaphysical and Durgastuti, Umasangit, Agamani or Vijaya songs. The first category of songs is inspired by devotion and spiritual thoughts. The second category which is based on themes of daily family matters or social events, is known as Padavali, Umasangit, Agamani or Vijaya songs.

== Popularity ==
Shyama Sangeet conceptualizes Goddess Kali as a loving human mother and the singer is longing for the Mother's love. The songs have become popular not only for its devotional side, but also for their human appeal.

The theme and occasion of Āgāmanī and Vijayā songs are as follows. Parvati (Umā or Gaurī), daughter of Himālaya and Menakā, was married to Śiva, the Lord of Kailāsa. Parvati as the form of Goddess Durga (the supreme universal mother-goddess) comes to see her parents from her in laws every year. The goddess is portrayed here as an ordinary girl living far away from her mother and feels joyous to come back home after a long stay at her in laws’ place. These songs too are highly popular because of their human appeal and as they are easily identifiable with any married girl living far away from their parents.

What Edward Thompson wrote in 1923 is true even today.

But the Śākta poems are a different matter. These have gone to the heart of a people as few poets' work has done. Such songs as the exquisite 'This day will surely pass, Mother, this day will pass,' I have heard from coolies on the road or workers in the paddy fields; I have heard it by broad rivers at sunset, when the parrots were flying to roost and the village folk thronging from marketing to the ferry. Once I asked the top class in a mofussil high school to write out a song of Rabindranath Tagore's; two boys out of forty succeeded, a result which I consider showed the very real diffusion of his songs. But, when I asked for a song of Rāmprasād's, every boy except two responded. Truly, a poet who is known both by work and name to boys between fourteen and eighteen, is a national poet. Tagore's songs are heard in Calcutta streets, and have been widely spread by the student community and the Brahmo Samaj; but in the villages of Bengal they are unknown, while Rāmprasād's are heard everywhere. 'The peasants and the paṇḍits enjoy his songs equally. They draw solace from them in the hour of despair and even at the moment of death. The dying man brought to the banks of the Ganges asks his companions to sing Rāmprasādī songs.

Shayama Sangeet became more popular at the time of Sri Ramkrishna Paramahansa, who was an ardent Kali bhakta/devotee. Ramprasad Sen, Rabindranath Thakur/Tagore, Girishchandra Ghosh, and Swami Vivekananda, Kazi Nazrul Islam, among others, composed numerous Shyama Sangeet. India's national song, 'Vande Maataram'/'Hail to the Mother', whose lyrics were written by Bankimchandra Chatterjee/Chattopadhyay and whose music was composed by Thakur/Tagore, is first and foremost a hymn to Ma Durga which hails the Indian motherland, "Bharat Mata", as being a form of the supreme goddess Durga. Rabindranath Thakur/Tagore's 'Jana Gana Mana', the Indian national anthem, contains a line, "Snehamayee tumi mata", which literally means India is a loving mother ("Bharat mata")... Rabindranath Thakur/Tagore also composed a song which was later picked to be the national anthem of Bangladesh ('Amar Sonar Bangla'/'My golden Bengal') in which he refers to the entirety of Bengal (undivided Bengal; the song was written before the partition of West Bengal and Bangladesh) as being a segment of the body of the supreme mother.

Generally, all music dedicated to goddess Mother Kali is called 'Shyama Sangeet' in Bengali. Two famous singers of this Bengali Shyama Sangeet are Pannalal Bhattacharya and Dhananjay Bhattacharya. Pannalal Bhattacharya's elder brother Prafulla Bhattacharya and middle brother Dhananjay Bhattacharya were the first music teachers of saint artist Pannalal Bhattacharya. Dhananjay Bhattacharya stopped singing devotional songs after finding the devotional spirit in his brother Pannalal. However, after the demise of Pannalal Bhattacharya, he contributed again in Bengali music with many devotional songs by his sweet, melodious voice.
