= Kamalakanta Bhattacharya (Bengal) =

Bengali Shakta poet and yogi of India

- কমলাকান্ত ভট্টাচার্য
- Born: 1769; Ambika Kalna, Burdwan, Bengal Presidency, British India (now Purba Bardhaman, West Bengal, India)
- Died: 1821 (aged 51–52); Burdwan, Bengal Presidency, British India
- Occupations: Court Advisor and Guru of Maharaja of Bardhaman, Tej Chandra
- Known for: Shakta poetry

Kamalakanta Bhattacharya (Bengali: কমলাকান্ত ভট্টাচার্য; c. 1769–1821), also known as Sadhaka Kamalakanta, was a Bengali Shakta poet and yogi of India of the late 18th century. He is often considered to have followed the example of Ramprasad, both in his poetry and in his lifestyle.

== Early life ==
Kamalakanta was born at Ambika Kalna in Bardhaman, Bengal Presidency. His father was Maheswar Bhattacharya, a Brahmin priest who died when Kamalakanta was still a boy. His mother, Mahamaya Devi, struggled financially to provide for the family with the meagre income from the small amount of land left to them, but she managed to send Kamalakanta to higher education.

Kamalakanta was a bright student, studying Sanskrit and showing an early talent for poetry and music. It is said that "his heart opened to the love of God" when he received the sacred thread and was initiated into spiritual practice by Chandra Shekhar Goswami. From an early age he expressed an interest in spirituality and later in life Kamalakanta received initiation into Tantric Yoga from a Tantric yogi named Kenaram Bhattacharya.

== Life ==
In order to support his family, Kamalakanta started a small school in addition to his work as a Brahmin priest. But Kamalakanta struggled to make ends meet. His songs made him famous during his lifetime. Because of his fame as a singer poet, the Maharaja of Bardhaman, Tej Chandra, asked Kamalakanta to be his Guru and appointed him as a court advisor. Throughout his life Kamalakanta was a great devotee of Kali and composed many impassioned and devotional love poems to the Mother.

It is said that the Divine Mother in her aspect of Mahakali wishes her sincere devotees to make the fastest progress. Kali is often depicted as the great destroyer of ignorance and hostile forces. The poetry of Kamalakanta displays this heroic attitude, imploring Kali to destroy limitations and bondage. The poetry of Kamalakanta also displays a profound faith in his all-powerful Kali.

The earth quakes under Your leaps and bounds.
You are frightful with that sword in Your hand.

Whilst Kali is often depicted as a black and terrifying form, this is just one aspect of hers as a destroyer of ignorance. Kamalakanta also alludes to the other aspect of Kali as he states in his poem - "Is my Mother Really Black?"

If She's black,
how can She light up the world?
Sometimes my Mother is white,
sometimes yellow, blue, and red.
I cannot fathom Her.
My whole life has passed trying. [trans. Rachel Fell McDermott]

The poems of Kamalakanta and Ramprasad were later sung by mystic Sri Ramakrishna, who himself was a great devotee of the Divine Mother. These devotional songs would often send Sri Ramakrishna into an ecstatic state as he became absorbed in contemplation of the Divine Mother. Many of these songs are recorded in The Gospel of Sri Ramakrishna, which at one point mentions, "... he (Ramakrishna) would spend hours singing the devotional songs of great devotees of the Mother, such as Kamalakanta and Ramprasad. Those rhapsodic songs describing direct vision of God ..."

Two legends are widely known of Kamalakanta. Once the Maharaja of Burdwan had asked him to show full moon in Amavasya (when there is no moon in the sky) but Kamalakanta was able to show a bright full moon to the Maharaja. He got mesmerized. Another legend goes that once the Maharaja had asked if he can show that the idol of Kali whom he worships as his mother is alive or not. Kamalakanta took a thorn of Bel (Wood apple) and gently pricked the feet of the idol of Mother Kali and then held a bel leaf under the wound. Slowly blood came out of the spot. The Maharaja dared not to question him like that. The two events filled his heart with deep gratitude for Kamalakanta. Such powerful matrisadhak was he. That idol is still worshipped now even in Burdwan. Grand festivals are arranged every year in the temple during Kali puja.

== Citations ==
=== Sources ===
- McDermott, Rachel Fell (1993). Evidence for the Transformation of the Goddess Kālī: Kamalākānta Bhaṭṭācārya and the Bengali Śākta Padāvalī Tradition. (Ph.D. diss., Harvard University, 1993)
