= Dhananjay Bhattacharya =

- Born: 10 September 1922; Bally, Howrah, Bengal Presidency, British India
- Origin: India
- Died: 27 December 1992 (aged 70) Kolkata, West Bengal, India
- Genres: singing, music direction, Adhunik Bangla Gaan (Bengali modern songs), Shyama Sangeet
- Occupations: Singer, composer

Dhananjay Bhattacharya (10 September 1922 – 27 December 1992) was an Indian Bengali singer and composer. He was a versatile Shyama Sangeet singer.

== Career ==
He started his career by singing modern Bengali as well as Hindi songs. His first song was "Jodi bhule jao more/janabo na abhiman..." in 1940, recorded with Pioneer Company. His first playback was in 1943. He was best known for singing Shyama Sangeet. Out of the 24 songs in the movie Sadhak Ramprasad (1956), Dhananjay sang 23. He was versatile in singing major types and forms of songs including modern Bengali, Hindustani classical music, Rabindra Sangeet, Kirtan, Bhajan, Baul, Ramprasadi (of Ramprasad Sen), Nazrul Geeti, and Shyama Sangeet. His singing career lasted more than fifty years. There are 500 records of his songs. He was also a lyricist and wrote about 400 songs in the name of "Shri Partha" and "Shri Ananda".

He acted in a few films, including "Nababidhan and Pasher Bari. In the latter, his song "Jhir Jhir Jhir Jhirjhiri Baroshay" composed by Salil Chowdhury became an instant hit. "Matite Janmo Nilam", "Ei Jhir Jhir Jhir Batase", and "Jhanana Jhanana Baje" were other major hits which are still popular. Dhananjay Bhattacharya's songs, composed by Prafulla Bhattacharya - 'Basarore Deep Aar Akasher Taraguli', 'Hridoye Mor Rakta Jhore', 'Phul Go Tomare Chuye', 'Ken Go Dola Lage', 'Tribhuban jay kariya Ravan,' and 'Sthir Hoe Tui Bas Dekh Ma' reached the peak of popularity.

Dhanajay won the Gold Prize for his devotional songs in Rani Rasmoni. Among his basic records, one Raag based composition by Salil Chowdhuri released as a Saradiya number was such a hit that it kept on selling during the next Puja as well.

Dhanajay was also a lyricist who was credited under different pseudonyms. A numbers of Pannalal Bhattacharya's songs were penned by him, as well as other musical compositions.

== Personal life ==
They were Barendra Brahmins. The descendants of this Bhaduri family were King Ganesh and Udayanacharya Bhaduri. 'The Levitating Saint' -Maharshi Nagendranath's father was Parboti charan Bhaduri. Parboti charan Bhaduri's brother Kalicharan Bhaduri was the father of the renowned sitar and Esraj player Surendranath Bhattacharya. Surendranath was awarded the title of Bhattacharya. So, instead of Bhaduri, Surendranath Bhattacharya used the surname 'Bhattacharya'. Three sons of Surendranath Bhattacharya were three legends of the Bengali music world — music director Prafulla Bhattacharya, renowned singer Dhananjay Bhattacharya and Pannalal Bhattacharya.

Dhananjay was married and had three sons. Out of them, only Dipankar has taken the onus upon him to carry the legacy of his father.

He and music director Prafulla Bhattacharya were the elder brothers of the singer Pannalal. He studied in Rivers Thompson School, Bally, Howrah.

Some people say that he and Pannalal both wanted to please Kali by offering her their songs. According to them Dhananjay received the grace of the divine mother, but Pannalal didn't. So he committed suicide, and after his death, Dhananjay bore the responsibility of Pannalal's family, along with his own.
