= List of festivals in Bangladesh =

Bangladeshi festivals

This is a list of festivals in Bangladesh.

== National observances ==
- Language Movement Day - (International Mother Language Day); Colours worn:
- Genocide Remembrance Day; Colours worn:
- Independence Day; Colours worn:
- July Mass Uprising Day
- Armed Forces Day
- Martyred Intellectuals Day; Colours worn:
- Victory Day; Colours worn:

== Religious observances ==
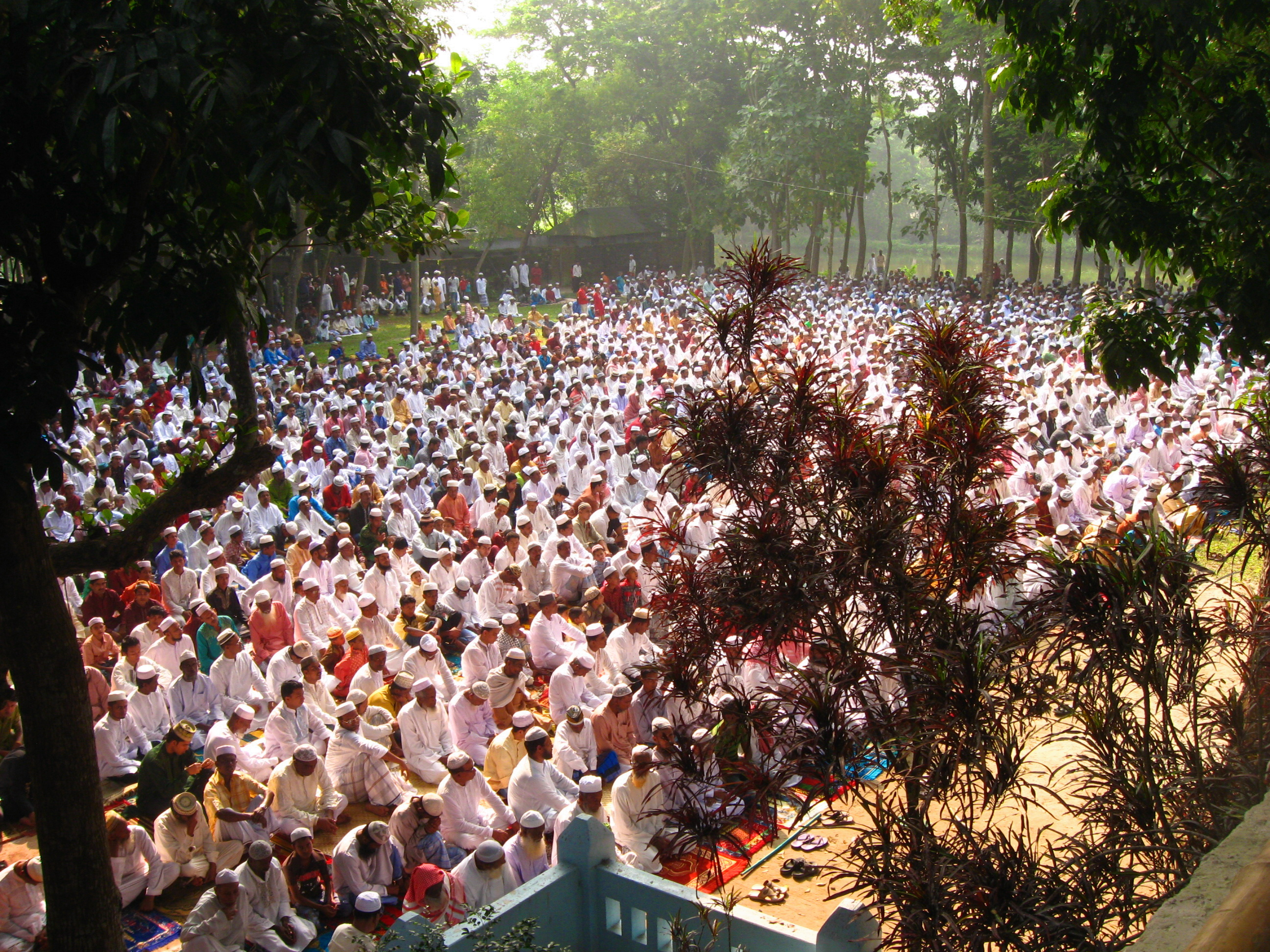
Eid prayer in Comilla

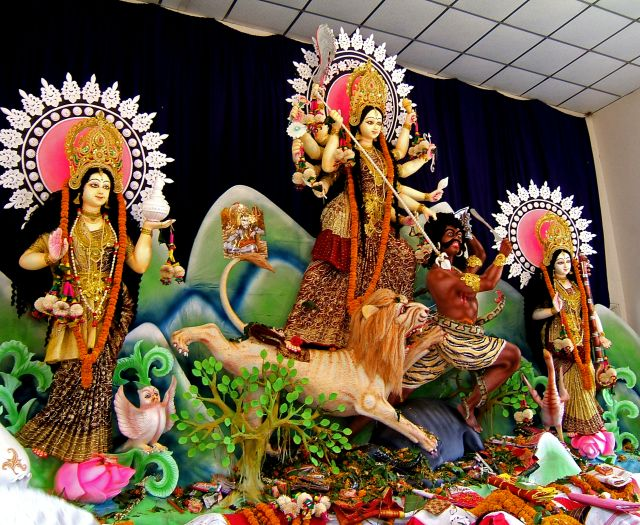
Durga puja in Dhakeshwari Temple, Dhaka

=== Muslim ===
- Eid ul-Fitr (Bengali: ঈদুল ফিতর/রোজার ঈদ) - on the 1st day of Shawwal month of the lunar Islamic calendar.
- Eid ul-Adha (Bengali: ঈদুল আজহার/কোরবানি)- on the 10th day of Dhu al-Hijjah month of the Islamic calendar.
- Chaand Raat (Bengali: চাঁদ রাত)- on the 29th or 30th night of Ramadan month of the Islamic calendar.
- Ashura (Bengali: আশুরা)- on the 10th day of Muharram in the Islamic calendar.
- Eid-e-Meeladun Nabi (Bengali: ঈদে মিলাদুন্নবি)– The Birth of the Prophet Muhammad
- Shab-e-Qadr (Bengali: শবে কদর)
- Shab-e-Barat (Bengali: শবে বরাত)
- Bishwa Ijtema(Bengali: বিশ্ব ইজতেমা)

=== Hindu ===
- Durga Puja - from the 2nd to the 7th day of Ashwin month of the Hindu calendar.
- Krishna Janmashtami - celebration of the birth of Lord Krishna
- Dolyatra
- Ratha Yatra, the most popular being Dhamrai Rathayatra.
- Kali Puja in Diwali
- Saraswati Puja
- Ashtami Snan on Chaitra Shukla Paksha Ashtami (ninth day during the waxing phase of moon in Chaitra Month) as per Hindu Lunar Calendar

=== Buddhist ===
- Buddha Purnima - Buddha's Birthday
- Madhu Purnima
- Kathin Chibardan - offering of woven robe made of cotton to monks and nuns.

=== Christian ===
- Boro Din or Christmas - on 25 December of the Gregorian calendar.
- Easter Sunday

== Cultural observances ==
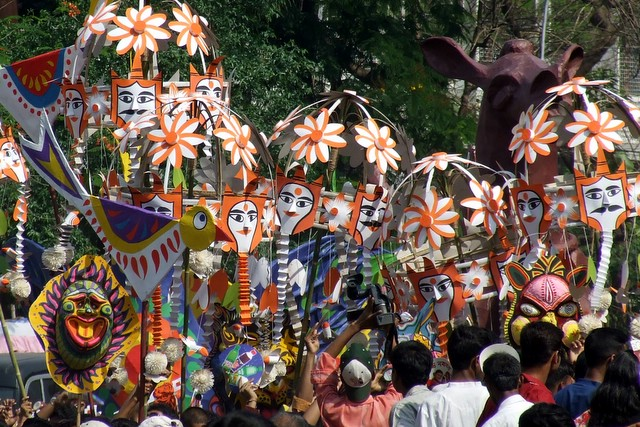
Celebrations of Pahela Baishakh at Dhaka

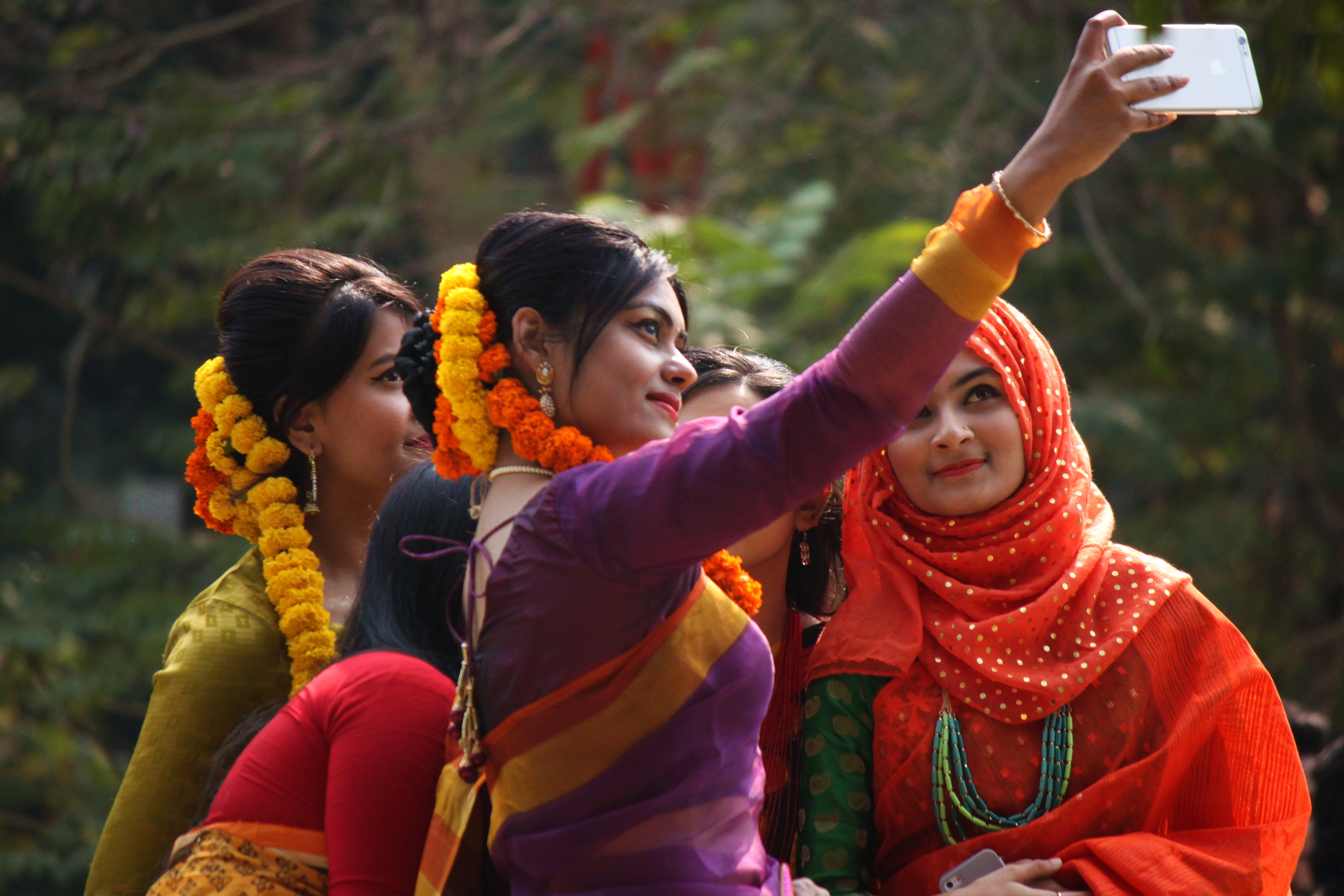
Bangladeshi girls taking Selfie at Pahela Falgun festival.

=== General ===
- Rokeya Day
- Rabindra Jayanti
- Nazrul Jayanti

=== Music ===
- Dhaka World Music Festival (music)
- Bengal Classical Music Festival
- International Folk Festival

=== Folk ===
- Pahela Baishakh - on the 1st day of the Bengali calendar and summer festival; also called Bangla Noboborsho; Colours worn:
- Spring festival also known as Pohela Falgun; Colours worn:
- Nabanna - Winter and harvest festival; Colours worn:
- Borsha Utshob - Monsoon festival; Colours worn:
- Nouka Baich - Boat racing festivals held after the monsoon when rivers are filled

=== Others ===
- Bengal Original Culture Festival
- Cinemaking International Film Festival
- Dhaka Festival
- Dhaka Art Summit
- Hay Festival Dhaka
- Dhaka Fashion Week
- Dhaka International Film Festival
- Chobi Mela International Photography Festival
- CRACK International Art Camp
- International Children's Film Festival Bangladesh
- Bioscope Children's Photography Festival
- Latin Dance Festival
- Liberation Docfest Bangladesh
- Hill Film Festival

== Fairs ==
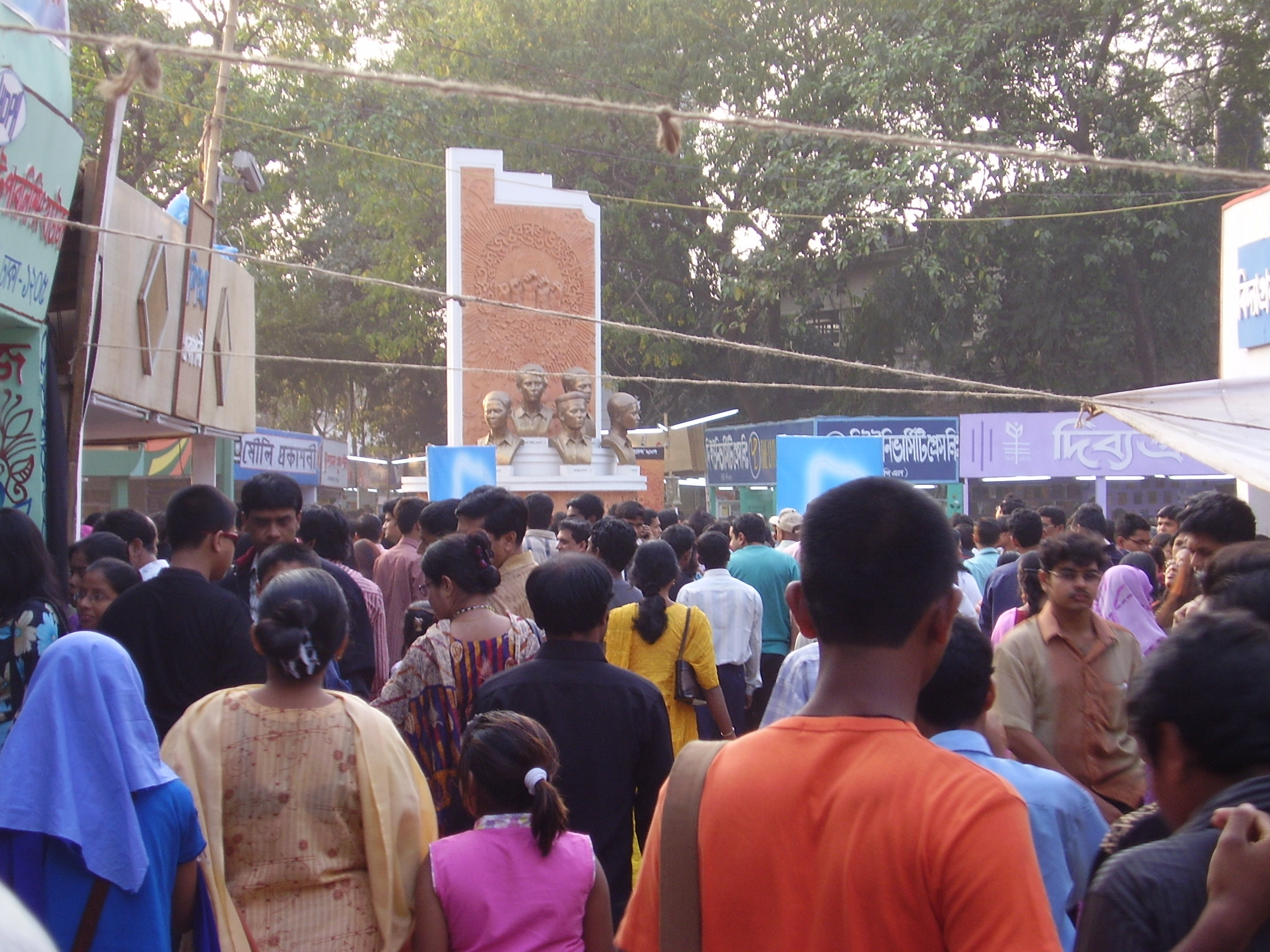
Ekushey Book Fair in Dhaka

- Ekushey Book Fair - in Dhaka on the month of February of the Gregorian calendar.
- Dhaka International Trade Fair
- National Tree Fair - Month-long National Tree Plantation Campaign and Tree Fair.
- National Fisheries Week and Fish Fair - Week-long National Fiash Trade and Fair.

== Local events ==
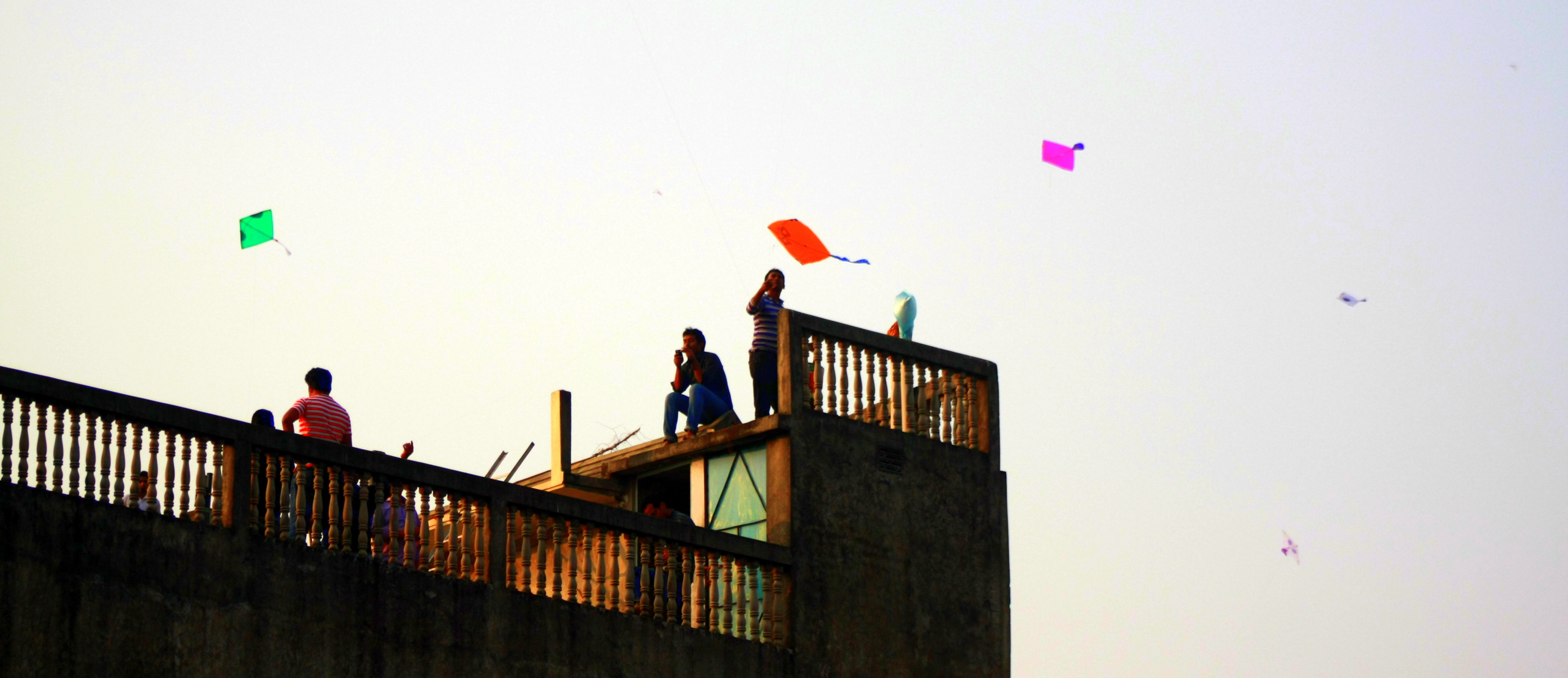
Shakrain kite festival, Dhaka

- Shakrain — in Dhaka at the end of the Poush of the Bengali calendar.
- Jatiya Pitha Utsab — National Pitha Festival.
- Charak — 3-day-long festival in Pabna starting on the last day of the Bangla month of Chaitra.
- Nouka Baich
- Bisu Mela

== See also ==
- Public holidays in Bangladesh
- Folk music festivals in Bangladesh
