= List of festivals in West Bengal =

Indian Festivals

West Bengal celebrates many holidays and festivals. Throughout the Bengali calendar, many festivals are celebrated. Durga Puja is solemnized as perhaps the most significant of all celebrations in West Bengal. Here is a list of the main festivals of West Bengal.

== Main festivals ==
- Poila Boishakh নববর্ষ
- Guru Purnima গুরু পূর্ণিমা
- Bhai Phonta ভাই ফোঁটা
- Kali Puja কালি পূজা
- Lakshmi Puja লক্ষ্মীপূজা
- Dolyatra দোলযাত্রা
- Ganesh Chaturthi গণেশ চতুর্থী
- Gaura Purnima গৌর পূর্ণিমা
- Vishwakarma Puja বিশ্বকর্মা পূজা
- Durga Puja দুর্গাপূজা
- Indian Independence Day স্বাধীনতা দিবস
- Jagaddhatri Puja জগদ্ধাত্রী পূজা
- Janmashtami জন্মাষ্টমী
- Nandotsav নন্দোৎসব
- Mahalaya মহালয়া
- May Day মে দিবস
- Basanta Utsav বসন্ত উৎসব
- Paush Parban পৌষ পার্বন
- Rabindra Jayanti রবীন্দ্র জয়ন্তী
- Death Anniversary of Rabindranath Tagore রবীন্দ্রনাথের মৃত্যু দিবস
- Rathayatra রথ যাত্ৰা
- Rakhi Bandhan রাখি বন্ধন
- 26 January- Republic Day প্রজাতন্ত্র দিবস
- Saraswati Puja সরস্বতী পূজা
- Kojagari Lakhsmi Puja কোজাগরী লক্ষ্মী পূজা
- Shivaratri শিবরাত্রি
- Birthday of Netaji নেতাজী জয়ন্তী
- Birthday of Swami Vivekananda বিবেকানন্দ জয়ন্তী
- Rothjatra রথ যাত্রা
- Jhulanjatra ঝুলন যাত্রা
- Poush Mela পৌষমেলা
- Eid al-Fitr ঈদুল ফিতর
- Eid al-Adha ঈদুল আযহা
- Christmas বড়দিন

== Other festivals ==
- Akshay Tritiya
- Bhadu
- Bera Bhasan Festival
- Gandheswari Puja
- Guptipara Rathayatra
- Nabanna
- Shakta Rash
- Buddha Purnima
- Jamai Shasthi
- Death Anniversary of Lokenath Brahmachari
- Ganga Dussehra
- Gangasagar fair and pilgrimage
- Snana Yatra
- Bandna Parab বাঁদনা পরব
- Bipattarini Brata
- Jhulan Yatra
- Viswakarma Puja
- Annakut Utsab
- Karam Parab করম পরব
- Kartik Puja
- Itu Puja
- Jitiya
- Basanti Puja
- Charak Puja
- Rathayatra of Mahesh
- Gajan
- Good Friday
- Basanta Utsav
- Tusu Parab টুসু পরব
- Kalpataru Utsab কল্পতরু উৎসব - 1 January of every year is celebrated as Kalpataru Day at Dakshineshwar and Kossipore Uddyanbati.
- Sri Ramakrishna Jayanti রামকৃষ্ণ জয়ন্তী
- Maghotsav of Brahmo Samaj মাঘ উৎসব
- Rakher Upobash
