= Khatemeh =

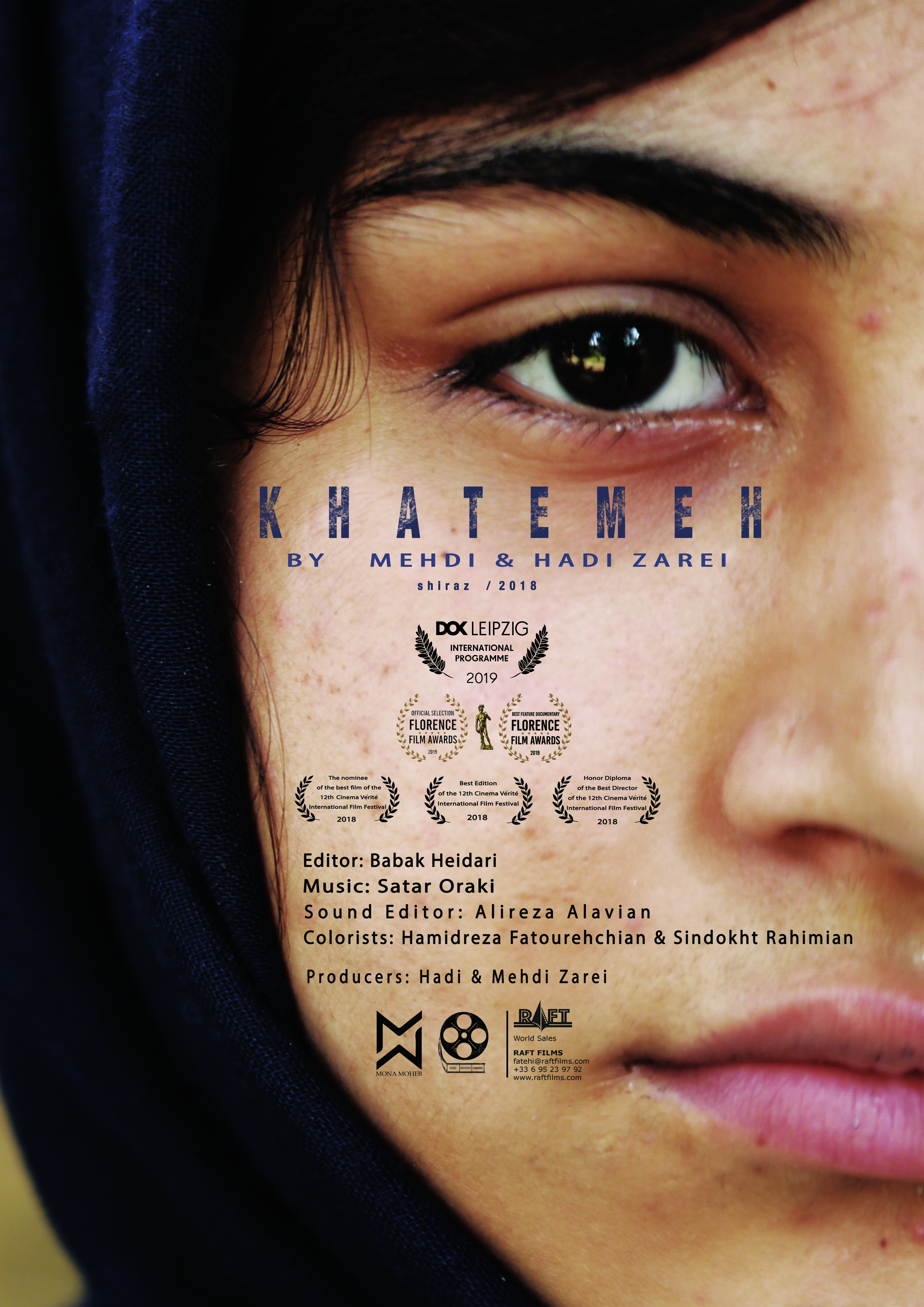
- Theatrical release poster
- Khatemeh
- Directed by: Mehdi and Hadi Zarei
- Written by: Mehdi and Hadi Zarei
- Produced by: Mehdi and Hadi Zarei
- Cinematography: Mehdi and Hadi Zarei
- Edited by: Babak Heydari
- Music by: Sattar Oraki
- Distributed by: Raft Films
- Release date: 15 August 2019 (Florence)
- Running time: 89 minutes
- Country: Iran
- Languages: persian, Pashtu

Khatemeh (Persian: خاتمه) is a 2020 Iranian documentary written and directed by twin brothers Mehdi Zarei and Hadi Zarei. The film depicts the true story of a 14-year-old Afghan refugee girl living in Shiraz, Iran, who is compelled to marry her deceased sister’s husband and later seeks protection in a women’s shelter to escape abuse.

The documentary premiered at international film festivals in 2019 and subsequently received several awards, including Best International Feature Documentary at the Herat International Women’s Film Festival and the Sarah Maldoror Award for Best Film at the MyArt International Film Festival in Italy.

It was produced independently in Iran and is distributed internationally by Raft Films, a Paris-based company representing independent Iranian and Middle Eastern cinema.

== Plot ==
Khatemeh follows the story of a 14-year-old Afghan girl and her refugee family who have been living in Shiraz, Iran, for more than three decades. After the suicide of her older sister, Khatemeh is pressured by her relatives to marry her late sister’s husband, a man twice her age. When the film begins, she has escaped her abusive marriage and taken refuge in a women’s shelter, where she seeks a divorce with the help of social workers.

Throughout the documentary, Khatemeh alternates between defiance and fear. At times she condemns her family’s control and insists on independence; at other times she pleads to return home despite the risks. As the story progresses, inconsistencies in the family’s narrative are gradually revealed, offering insight into the social and psychological pressures surrounding early and forced marriage.

According to the DOK Leipzig festival catalogue, “Khatemeh is like a desert storm which obscures the viewer again and again, then reveals a new vista when it has died down.”

== Production ==
Khatemeh was independently produced in Iran by twin brothers Mehdi Zarei and Hadi Zarei, who also wrote, directed, and filmed the documentary. The brothers were born in 1983 in Shiraz and began their artistic careers in theatre before turning to filmmaking. They developed the project after encountering Khatemeh’s real-life case and spent several years documenting her story to gain the family’s trust.

Cinematography is credited jointly to Mehdi and Hadi Zarei, employing a cinéma vérité style. Editing was by Babak Heidari, who received the Best Editing Award at the Cinema Vérité Documentary Film Festival. The original score was composed by Sattar Oraki, known for his work on A Separation (2011) and The Salesman (2016), and sound design was by Alireza Alavian, an Iranian sound editor and mixer.

The film’s dialogue is in Persian and Pashto, reflecting the family’s Afghan background. International sales and festival distribution were managed by Raft Films, a Paris-based distributor specializing in independent Iranian cinema.

Khatemeh runs 89 minutes and was completed in late 2018, premiering internationally in 2019.

== Critical reception ==
Although Khatemeh did not receive wide coverage in mainstream Western media, it was positively reviewed within Asian and independent film circles. Asian Movie Pulse described the documentary as “one of the most shocking documentaries of recent years,” praising its editing, pacing, and narrative structure. Reviewer Panos Kotzathanasis wrote that the film “reveals customs that may sound medieval to Western audiences but remain painfully real.”

English-language Iranian outlets such as Iran Daily, Iran Art, and Mehr News Agency frequently reported on the film’s international success, citing it among the “Best Asian Documentaries of 2020.” The MyArt International Film Festival jury commended the Zarei brothers for telling Khatemeh’s story “with empathy and discretion,” highlighting the filmmakers’ ability to turn an otherwise invisible personal struggle into a powerful social testimony.

Critics have noted the film’s use of the cinéma vérité technique and its ethical approach toward the subject matter, describing Khatemeh as a significant example of contemporary Iranian documentary cinema.

== Availability ==
As of 2025, Khatemeh is available for streaming on Docunight, a video-on-demand platform specializing in Iranian documentaries, and is listed on GuideDoc under the themes Justice, Social Issues, and Women’s Rights. The film is not currently available on major commercial streaming services such as Netflix or Amazon Prime Video, but continues to be screened at human rights and women’s film festivals internationally.

For educational or non-profit screenings, access is managed through Raft Films, the film’s international distributor based in Paris.

== Credits ==
| Role | Name |
|---|---|
| Directors / Writers / Producers / Cinematography | Mehdi Zarei and Hadi Zarei |
| Editing | Babak Heidari |
| Music | Sattar Oraki |
| Sound design | Alireza Alavian |
| Distributor | Raft Films (France) |
| Languages | Persian, Pashto |
| Runtime | 89 minutes |
| Country | Iran |

== Awards and nominations ==
| Festival / Award | Year | Location | Category | Recipient(s) | Result |
|---|---|---|---|---|---|
| MyArt International Film Festival | 2021 | Cosenza, Italy | Sarah Maldoror Award – Best Film | Mehdi Zarei, Hadi Zarei | Won |
| Life After Oil International Film Festival | 2020 | Sardinia, Italy | Special Jury Mention – Human Rights | Mehdi Zarei, Hadi Zarei | Won |
| Herat International Women’s Film Festival | 2020 | Herat, Afghanistan | Best International Feature Documentary (Earrings Statue) | Mehdi Zarei, Hadi Zarei | Won |
| Golden Tree International Documentary Festival | 2020 | Frankfurt, Germany | Best Documentary Film | Mehdi Zarei, Hadi Zarei | Nominated |
| Cardiff International Film Festival | 2020 | Cardiff, United Kingdom | Best Documentary Film | Mehdi Zarei, Hadi Zarei | Nominated |
| Palm Springs International Film Festival | 2020 | Palm Springs, United States | Best Documentary Film | Mehdi Zarei, Hadi Zarei | Nominated |
| Liberation Docfest Bangladesh" | 2020 | Dhaka, Bangladesh | Official Selection | Mehdi Zarei, Hadi Zarei | Nominated |
| International Film Festival-FICNOVA" | 2020 | Madrid, Spain | Official Selection | Mehdi Zarei, Hadi Zarei | Nominated |
| Florence Film Awards" | 2019 | Florence, Italy | Best Feature Documentary | Mehdi Zarei, Hadi Zarei | Won |
| Dok Leipzig" | 2019 | Leipzig, Germany | Official Selection – International Program | Mehdi Zarei, Hadi Zarei | Nominated |
| ÍRÁN:CI" | 2020 | Prague, Czech Republic | Official Selection | Mehdi Zarei, Hadi Zarei | Nominated |
| Cinéma Vérité | 2018 | Tehran, Iran | Best Director (Feature Documentary) | Mehdi Zarei, Hadi Zarei | Won |
| Cinéma Vérité | 2018 | Tehran, Iran | Babak Heidari | Best Editing | Won |

== See also ==
Cinéma Vérité (film festival)
