= Folk music festivals in Bangladesh =

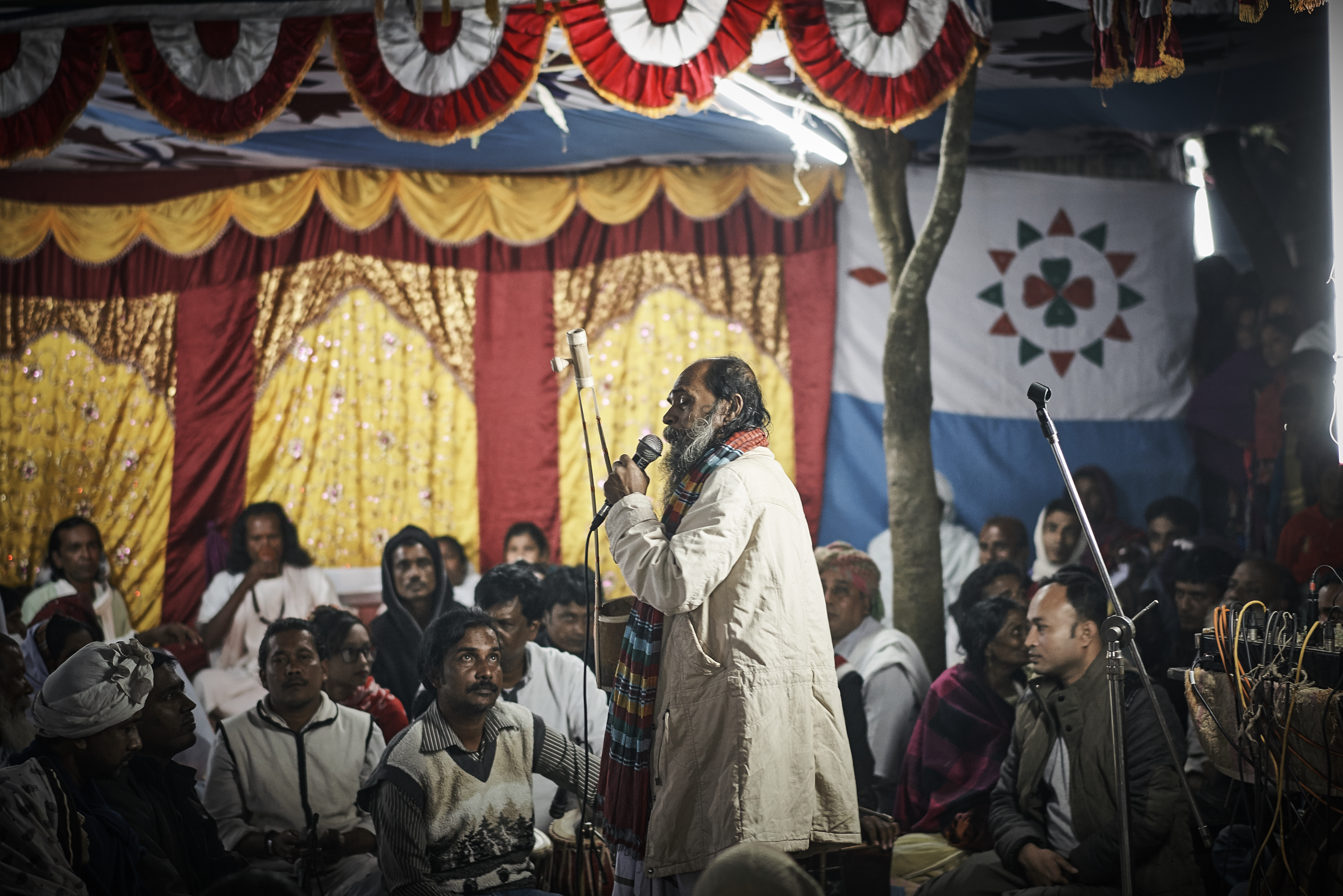
Musical festival in Kushtia

Folk music is one of the genres of music in Bangladesh, which generally talks about the lives of the people of rural Bengal.

== Festivals ==
=== Dhaka International FolkFest ===
Dhaka World Music Festival also referred to as Dhaka World Music Fest is an international folk music festival held in Dhaka, Bangladesh featuring national and international music stars of different genres. The festival covers an extensive scope of performances from local folk and traditional music genres to world fusion and contemporary world music across the globe. The festival is perceived to be a cardinal platform in Bangladesh to witness the true fusion in the form of world music.

=== Pohela Boishakh ===
Pohela Boishakh is the first day of the Bengali calendar which is the official calendar of Bangladesh. This festival is celebrated on 14 April in Bangladesh and 15 April in the Indian states of West Bengal, Tripura, and Assam (Barak Valley) by Bengalis regardless of religious faith.

=== Pohela Falgun ===
Pohela Falgun is a Spring festival, also known as the first day of Spring of the Bengali month Falgun. The celebration was started in 1991 by students of Dhaka University's Faculty of Fine Arts. The first of Falgun usually falls on 13 February of the Gregorian Calendar.

=== Nabanna ===
Nabanna is a Bengali winter and harvest festival, usually celebrated with food, dance and folk music in Bangladesh.

=== Barsha Utsab ===
Barsha Utsab, also known an Barsha Mangal Utsab, is a day-long Monsoon salutation festival celebrated in Bangladesh. The festival date is set according to the lunisolar Bengali calendar as the first day of its third month Asharh, usually falls on 15 June of the Gregorian Calendar. This day is marked with colourful celebration including folk music singing performances, drama, poetry recitation, screening of cinemas on rain.

=== Bizhu ===
Bizhu is a three-day-long festival that commemorates the commencement of a new year for the Chakmas and is their most important festival. Bizhu marks the Chaitra-sankranti, which is the last day of the Bengali calendar. Bizhu is also a folk music accompaniments festival.

=== Nouka Baich ===
Nouka Baich is the boat racing festival held after the monsoon when rivers are filled in Bangladesh. It is also a traditional dragon boat-style paddling sport in Bangladesh. The Bangladesh Rowing Federation, established in 1974, is the authority of all rowing activities in Bangladesh.

=== Astok geet ===
Astok song or astok dance is one of the major trends in the ancient folk culture of West Bengal and Bangladesh. It is usually performed during various Chaitra Sankranti rituals in the Bengali Hindu society.

In general, on the occasion of "Niler/Shiva's Gajan" ancillary to "Gajan Utsav" on the last three days of Chaitra month, as tak songs and dances are organized in different parts of the country, especially at folk fairs organized in the south-west, as one of the main ancillary performances in various forms of songs and rituals.

=== Akharai Song ===
Akharai song is a popular song of a special genre prevalent in the Indian state of West Bengal, India at the end of the 18th century and early 19th century. Kuluichandra Sen and Ramnidhi Gupta are the promoters of this new genre of songs. King Navakrishna was the patron of this custom.

=== Kavigan ===
Kavigan is a special genre of Bengali folk music. In this genre, folk poets participate in competitive music. The singer has to be a poet. He composes verses by mouth and sings instantly. The poet's performers are called poets.

=== Gazir pot ===
Gazir pot is a traditional folk painting of Bengal. The theme of the folk song is the story of Pir Barakhan Ghazi, which narrates the various events of Ghazi Pir in the form of lyrics. Ghazi's Pot episode was earlier one of the modes of entertainment in the rural areas of Greater Dhaka, Mymensingh, Sylhet, Comilla, Noakhali, Jessore, Khulna, Rajshahi. The old Ghazi pot is currently preserved in Ashutosh Museum, Shilpaacharya Zainul Lok and Crafts Museum, Bangla Academy Museum etc. The main subsistence of the episode is ghazi pir's greatness and miraculous power, comedy mixed proverbs and fear of death.

== Type of Bengali folk music ==
- Bhawaiya
- Bhatiali
- Palli Geeti
- Gombhira
