= Masks of West Bengal =

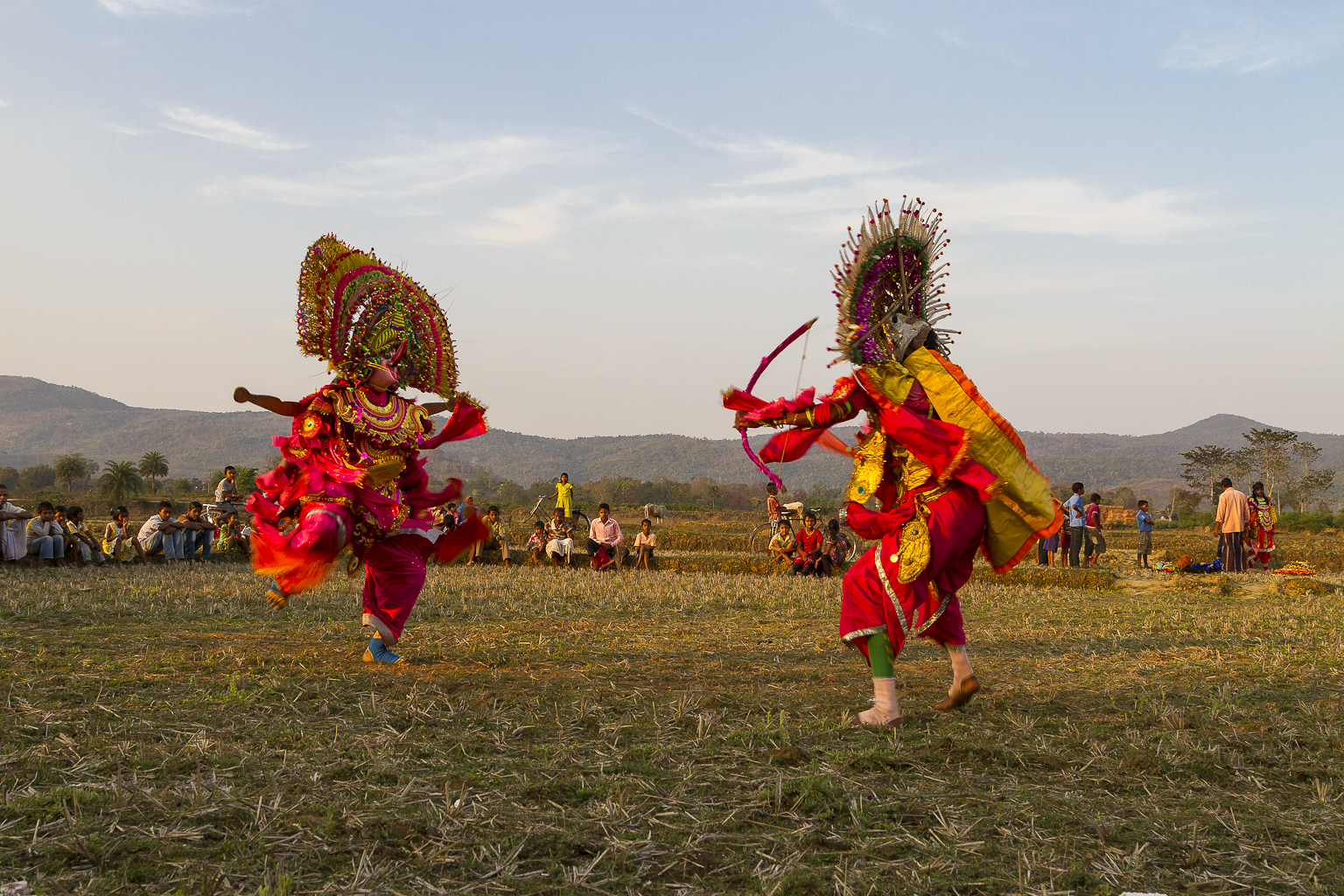
Chhau Mask dance performing in the field

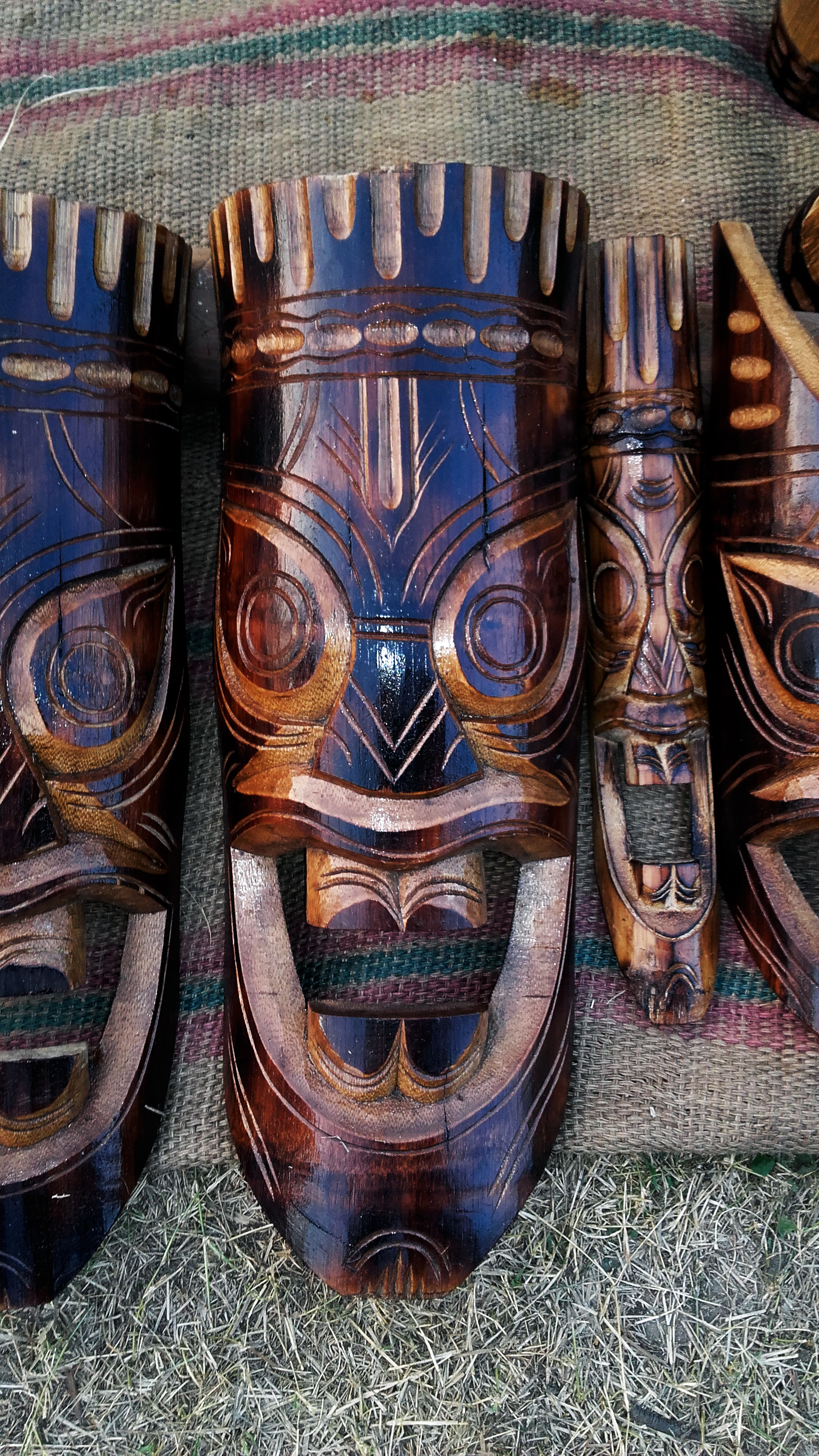
Tribal bamboo mask from Dinajpur

Mask or Mukhosh of West Bengal, as it is known for has a mysterious history. Mostly it uses for the Mask Dance, the folk dance of West Bengal. The wearing of these masks is connected with early types of folklore and religion. There are various type of masks made up of clay, wood, sponge wood or shola, pith, paper, metal etc. Generally, half of these masks are made up of clay, pith and paper and wooden masks are very rare. Some of these masks come from the Tribal of West Bengal. Geographically, West Bengal comes well within this mask using culture zone. Masks in West Bengal is mostly used in folk dance. UNESCO selected The Rural Craft Hub of Bengal to showcase their artwork in Paris in 2015.

== Classification ==
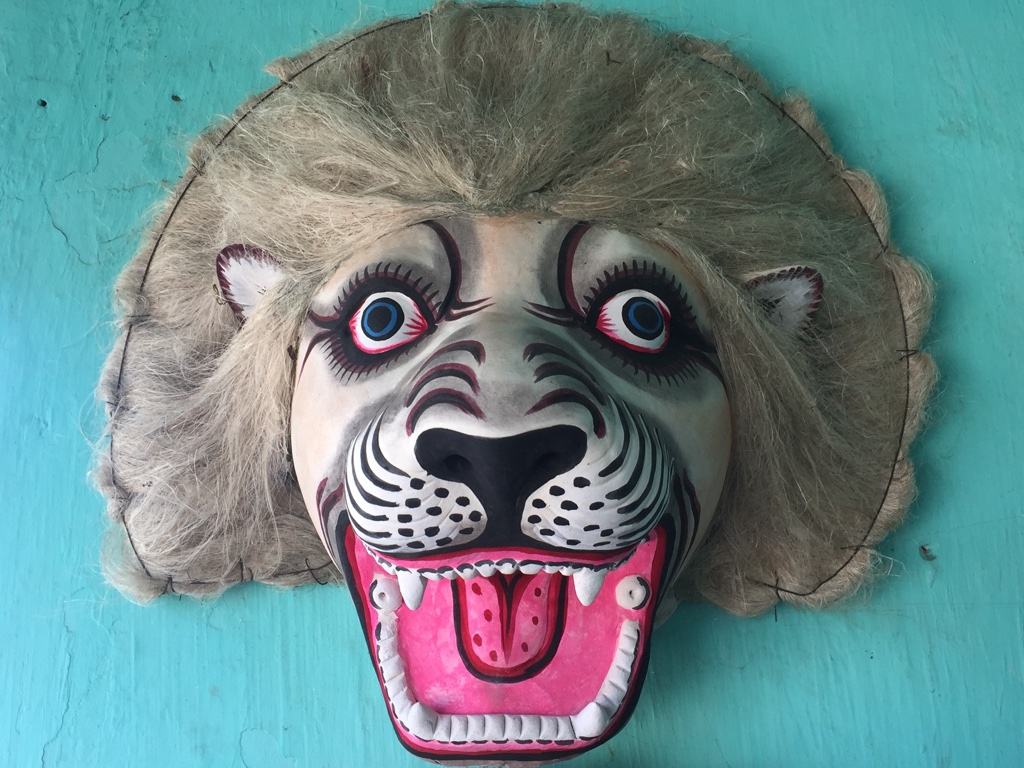
mask from purulia

Mask artisan shape out models from materials like bamboo, wood, sponge wood, clay, paper, pith etc. After they shape out the masks then it is painted with various colours.

=== Wooden mask ===
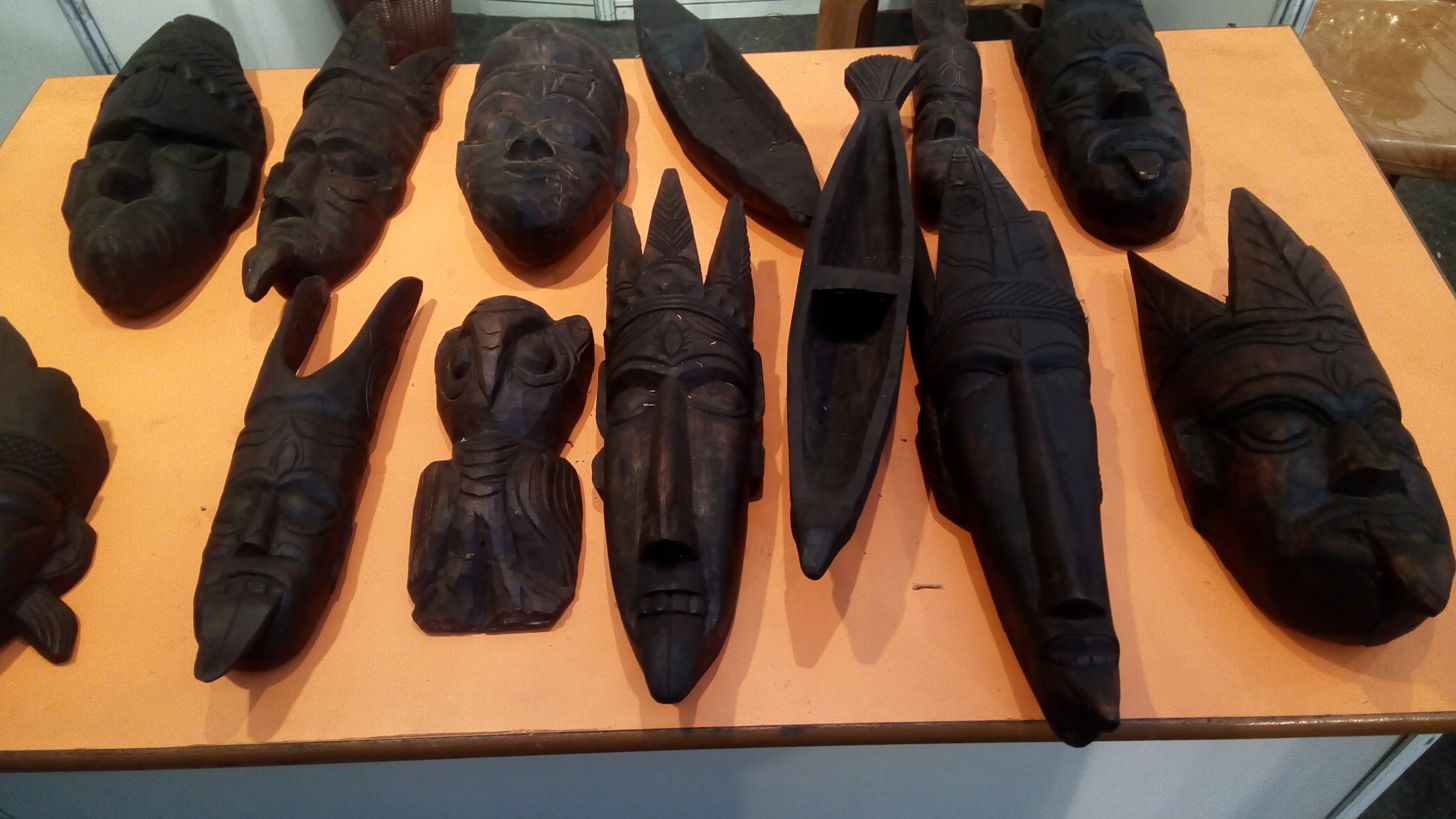
Wooden Gomera Masks of Dakshin Dinajpur

The masks of Bengal are acclaimed for their craftsmanship. A lot of masks are made up of wood. Among the masks of Bengal, Gomera masks, Shiknidhal mask, Gambhira dance masks, Gilded masks of Kushmundi, Bagpa dance masks are made up of wood.

=== Sponge wood (shola) masks ===
Sponge wood masks are used in the ancient Gomera dance of North Dinajpur. Shola masks from Murshidabad are also popular.

=== Clay mask ===
Clay masks of Ghurni have been the notable centre of clay art for a long time. The most popular folk dance of West Bengal is Chhau dance where the mask is an inseparable part. The making of a mask goes through various stages. The facial features are made of clay. Kolkata Kumortuli is well known for its statues and their masks are very popular. In Nabadwip Shiber Mukhosh is a popular clay mask.

=== Bamboo mask ===
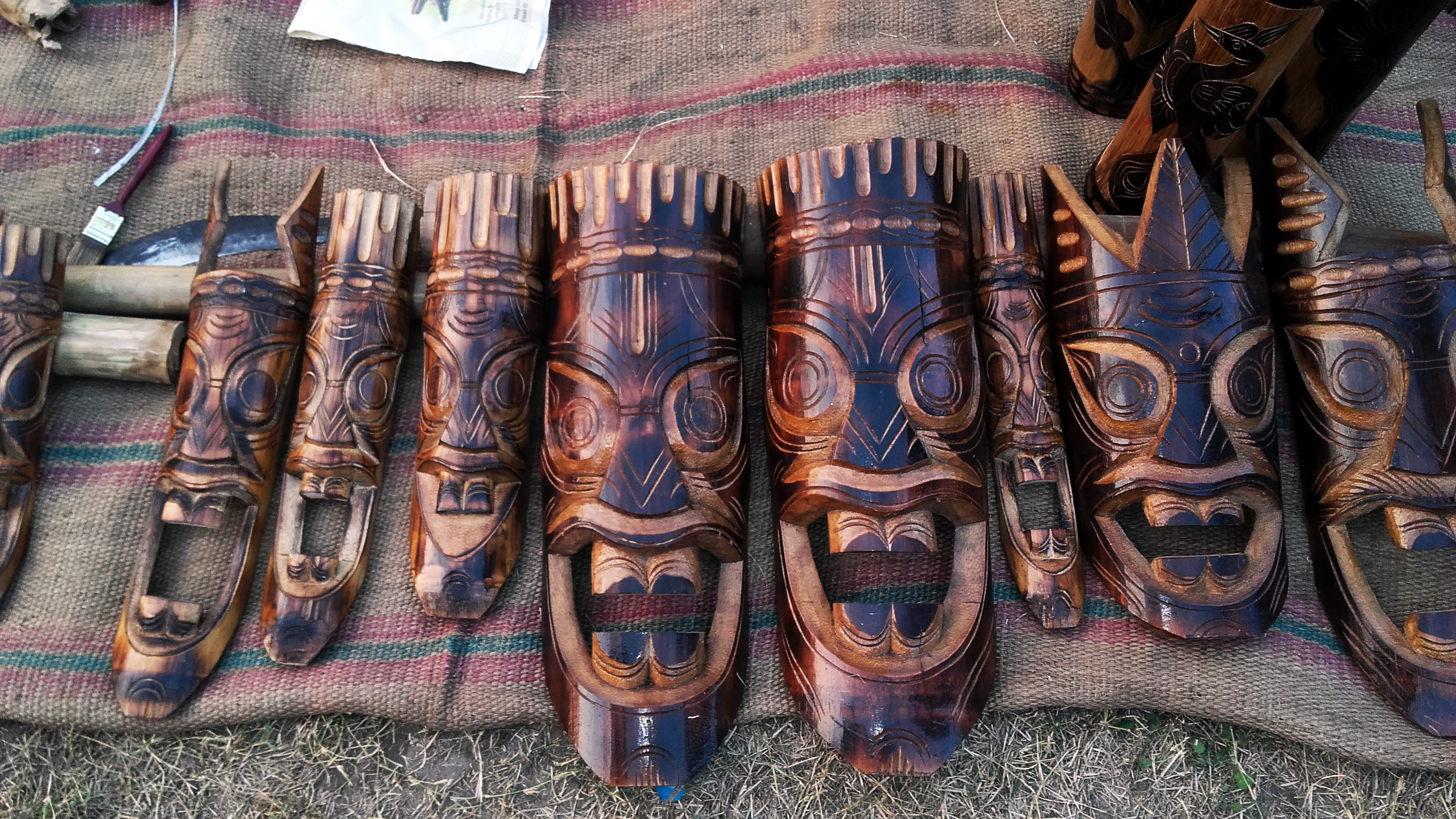
Bamboo mask of Dinajpur, W.B

Bamboo mask is a popular folk mask originated in Dinajpur District of West Bengal. It made of a single piece of bamboo stick. The Mask is like a Tribal mask.

=== Metal mask ===
The metal mask is Dhokra masks. It's a folk art of West Bengal.

== Chhau dance mask ==
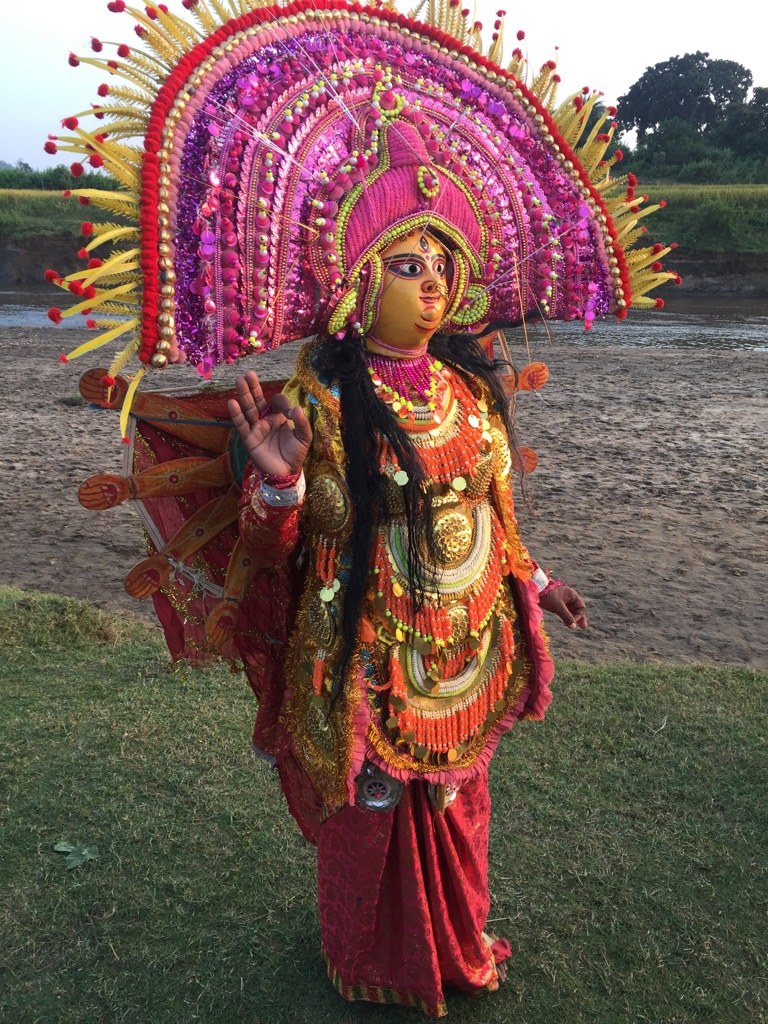
A Chhau dancer in Bagmundi

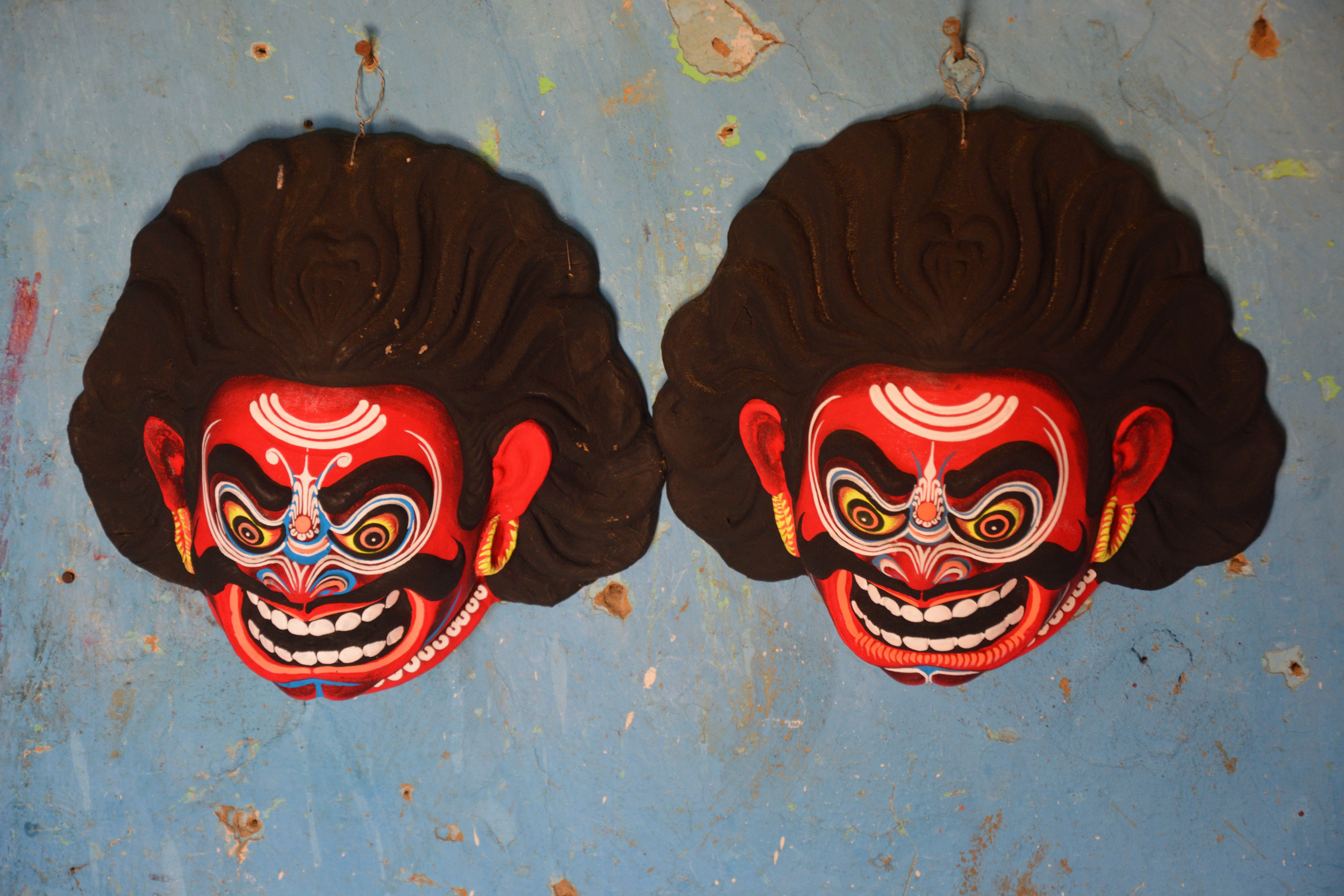
chhau mask

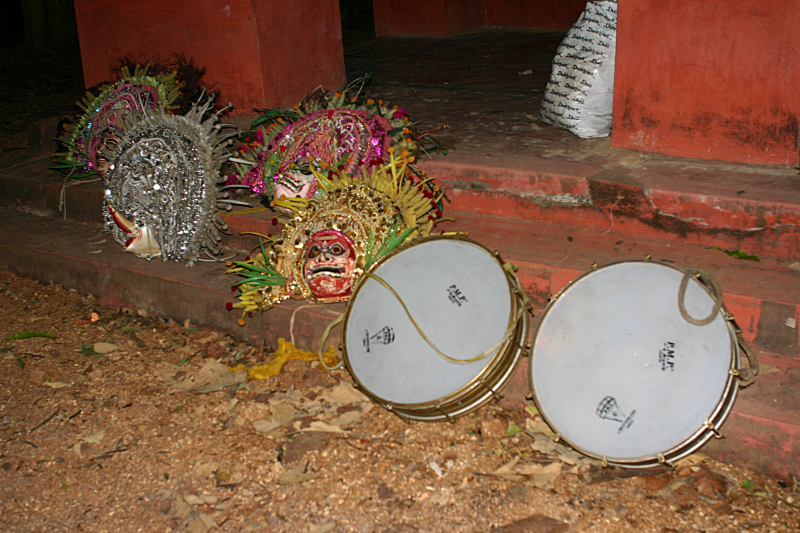
mask and musical instrument of chhau dance

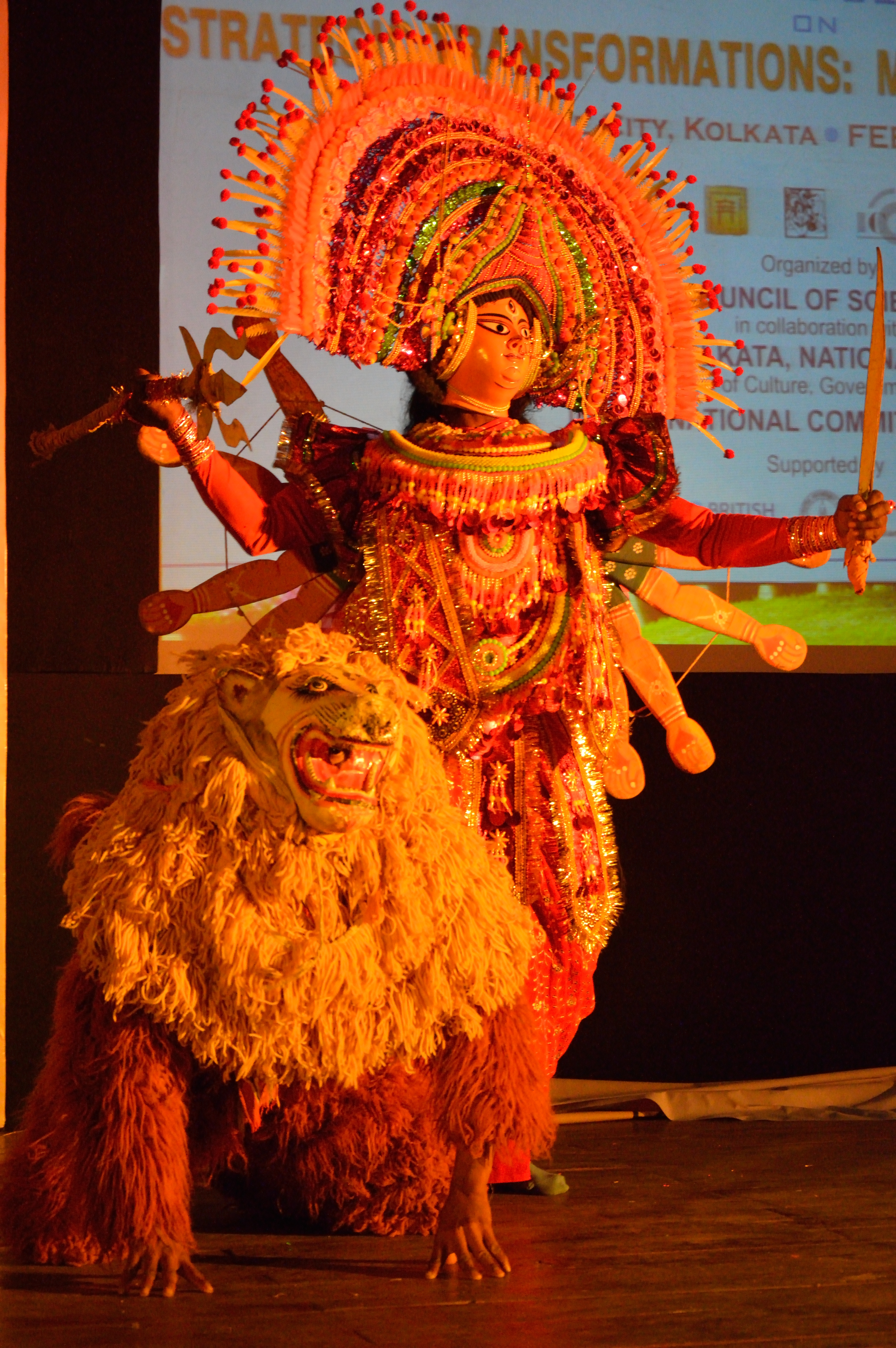
Durga with Lion, Purulia style Chhau

Chhau masks and dancer of West Bengal

The most interesting fact, Purulia Chhau Dance is listed on UNESCO’s world heritage list of dances. The main difference between the Purulia chhau and Orisha chhau is in the use of the mask. Purulia chhau used the mask in dance, but Orisha does not have the mask thereby adding facial expression with body movement and gesture. Traditionally, the chhau dance held in the mid march when one agricultural circle ends and a new circle begins. Purulia chhau dancer were the earthy and theatrical mask which represent the mythological characters. After making the shape of mask with clay, it is coloured and decorated with Shola and other things.

These Chhau Masks are made by the artists from the Sutradhar community. The making of a mask goes through various stages. 8-10 layers of soft paper, immersed in diluted glue, are pasted one after another on the mould before the mud mould is dusted with fine ash powder. The facial features are made of clay. A special layer of mud and cloth is applied and the mask is then sun-dried. After this, the mould is polished and the second round of sun drying is done before separating the layers of cloth and paper from the mould. After finishing and drilling of holes for the nose and eyes, the mask is colored and decorated.

== Gomera mask ==
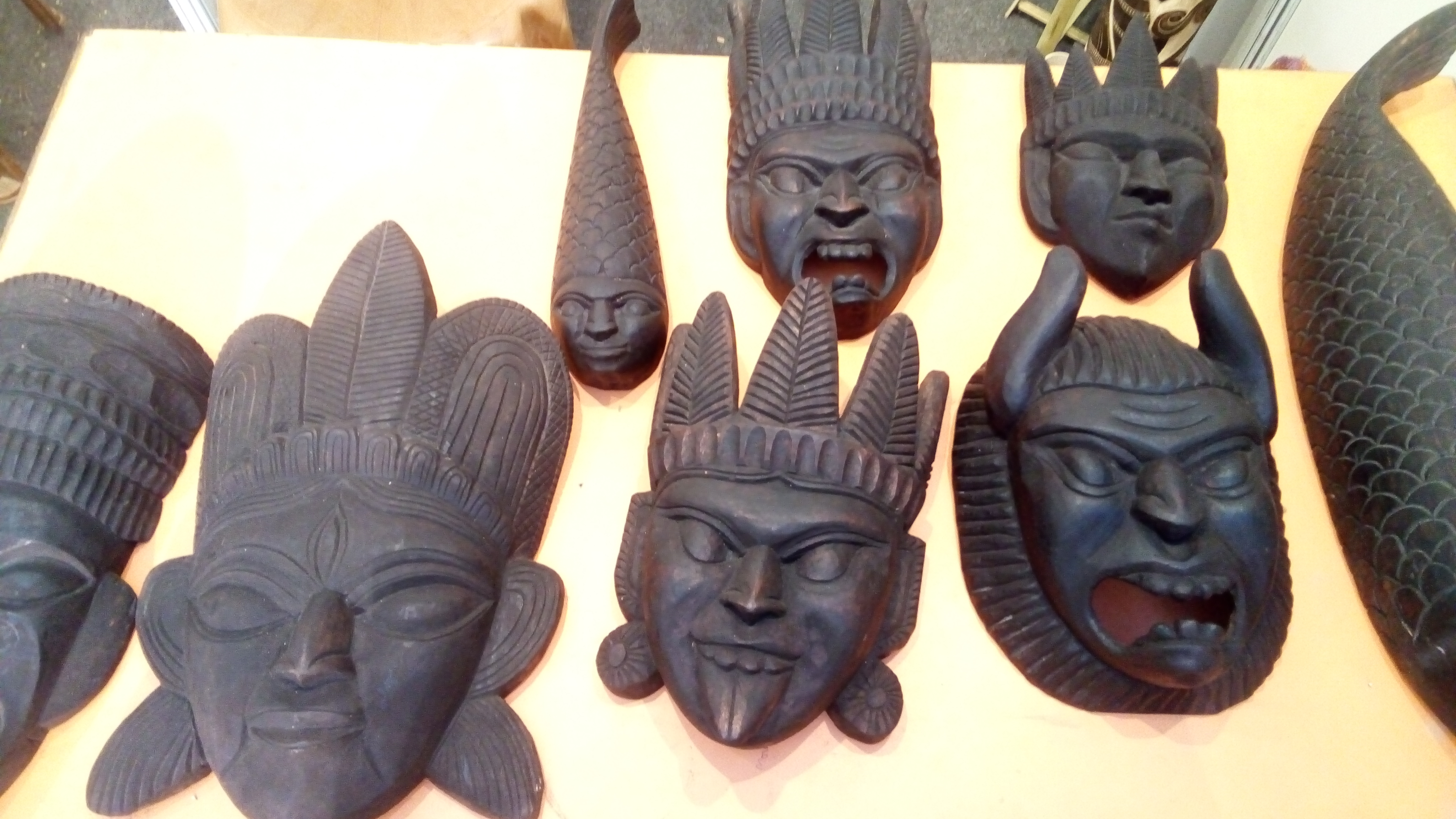
Wooden Gomera Masks of Dakshin Dinajpur

Gomera mask is a part of Gomera dance which is originated in North and South Dinajpur of West Bengal. The word Gomera is colloquial from Gram-Chandi, a female deity. The extract origin of this craft is no doubt very old and some of the craftsmen claim it is at least as old as the beginning of Kali Yuga. The Gomera dances are organized to propitiate the deity to usher in the good forces and drive out the evil forces. The mask dance organised within the month of mid-April to mid-July. The wood-crafted Gomera mask represents two distinct forms. The characters of two distinct forms of dance are the Gomera and the Ram-Vanwas. The scary masks of the Gomera are made from the wood of the Gamar tree. Holes are made under the eyes of the mask for the wearer to see.

In Gomera mask dance Mahiraban is a mythical character in the epic Ramayana. Mahiraban is said to be the brother of Raban, the Lanka king. The tri-headed wooden mask is made to represent Mahiraban. This mask is popular in South Dinajpur.

The ancient Gomera dance of North Dinajpur used sponge wood mask. At first, the artist prepares a model from mashed paper layered upon a piece of cloth soaked in mud water. After drying the cloth, it is topped with sponge wood and coloured. For the glow, it is given a varnish polish n the mask and decorated with sequences, foil and coloured paper.

Shiknidhal mask, the other gigantic wooden mask used in the gomira dance of South Dinajpur. This mask is used in the war dance. It is also called Mukha Khel meaning the game of masks.

In 2013, after a memorandum of understanding was signed between the West Bengal government and UNESCO to promote culture-based livelihoods, things began to change for the better for these mask-makers.

== Clay masks ==
Ghurni region of Krishnanagar has been a notable center of clay art for a long time. Their clay mask of Durga and the other is well known for their beauty and the mask follow a contemporary style. Kolkata Kumartuli is well-known for clay mask. The masks are made in clay and then sun-dried and finally coloured and decorated with sponge wood or foil. Potter has been receiving a lot of attention for sculpting Bengali deities.

== Gambhira mask ==
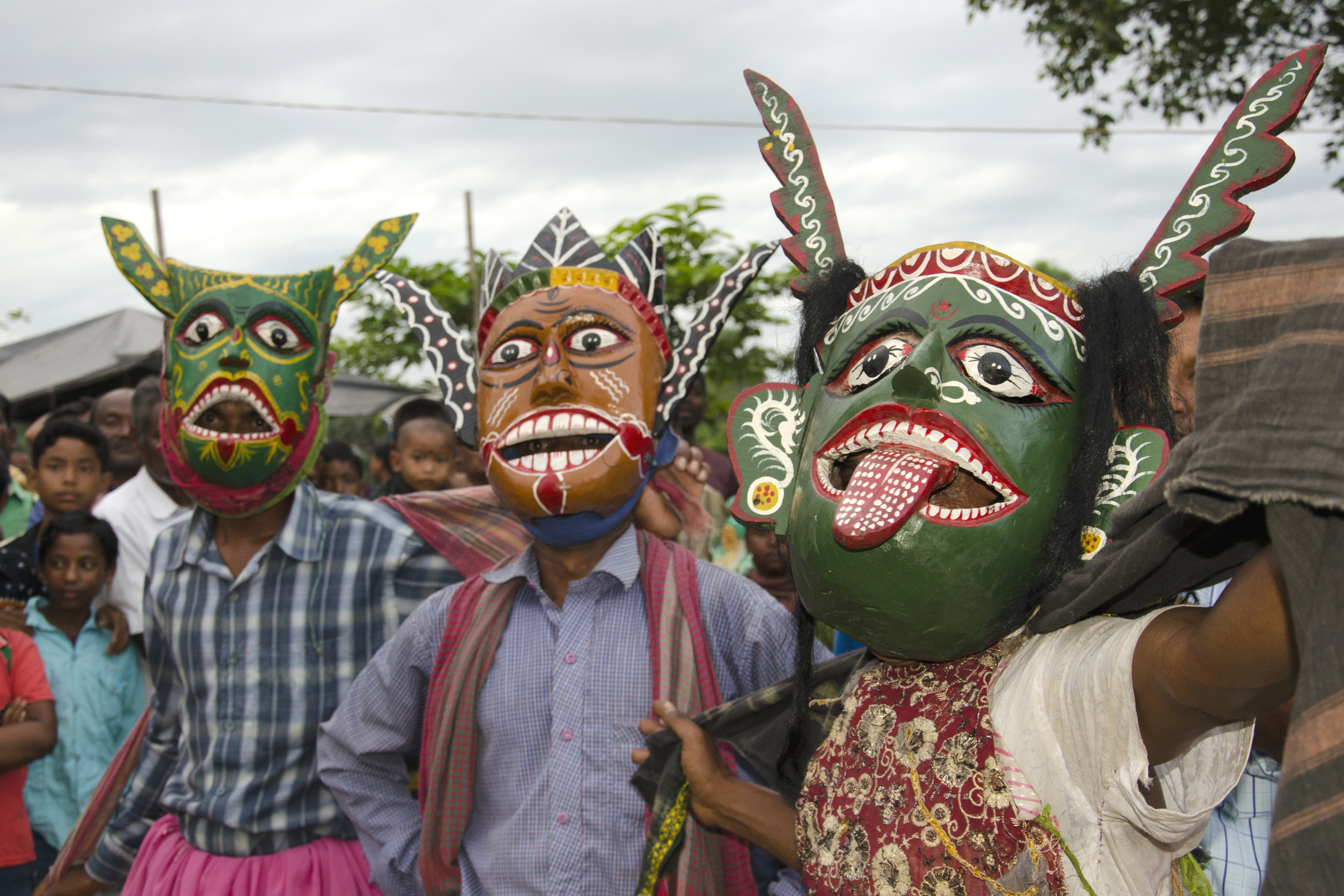
People wearing various types of wooden Gombhira mask

The Gambhira dance is performed all over the Malda district of North Bengal during the festival of Chaitra Sankranti. The masks are made out of neem and fig trees by the local Sutradhar community. Sometimes they were also made the mask of clay. The three-dimensional crowns are the specialty of these masks. First, the facial features are carved out from a piece of wood and then coloured according to the character. This mask dance performed with Gombhira song. The songs of Gambhira originated among the Hindu community of Maldah in West Bengal, completely in its theme formation.

== Rabankata mask ==
Rabankata mask dance is performed during Durga Puja in Bishnupur of Bankura district. The theme is the victory of good over the evil where Goddess Durga stands for the good that destroys the evil Raban. It is an old mask dance which is started between 1626 and 1656 CE. Six masks uses in the dance where the first four are used directly in the dance and the other two are absolutely ritualistic.

== Dokra mask ==
Dokra is unique folk art of West Bengal.Metal casting dokra mask is created various contemporary sculptures with this art form. Gita Karmakar, a female artist from Bankura has been awarded the President’s award. Her works of Dokra art are equally popular in other countries.

== Gilded mask ==
The Gilded mask is an ecstatic wooden mask from Kushmundi in the district of Dakshin Dinajpur, West Bengal. It is part of the costume of the traditional Gamira dancers. The themes of the masks are generally historic and religious. The mask made out of Bamboo and wood. The weight of the masks is around 2.5 to 3 kg. The soft wood, which is used to make the mask is called gamari. so that it can be easily chiselled into intricate designs. The mask is then covered with exquisite Italian gold leaves hammered into thin sheets.

== Shola mask of Murshidabad ==
Durga face is a well known shola mask of Murshidabad. It's mainly used for the decorate status. For making this masks, shola is pulled from water and dried. Then it is cut with the knife according to the design. The most attractive fact, Murshidabad is recognize for the shola work.

== Bagpa dance mask ==
Bagpa dance is a mask dance which is a part of tantrik Buddhism. It was conceptualised by Guru Padmashambhava. Bagpa is called Bagchham by the Buddhist guru lamas of Tamang. This dance is also known as Lama dance in the Himalayan region of Bengal. It’s a war dance based on the theme of the destruction by evil and for the well-being of humanity. It is a colorful wooden mask mainly colored with red, blue and white. Other color is used for detailing the mask.

== See also ==
- Chhau dance
- Chhau Mask
- Ghurni
- Kumortuli
- Gombhira
