= Pohela Falgun =

Spring festival of Bangladesh

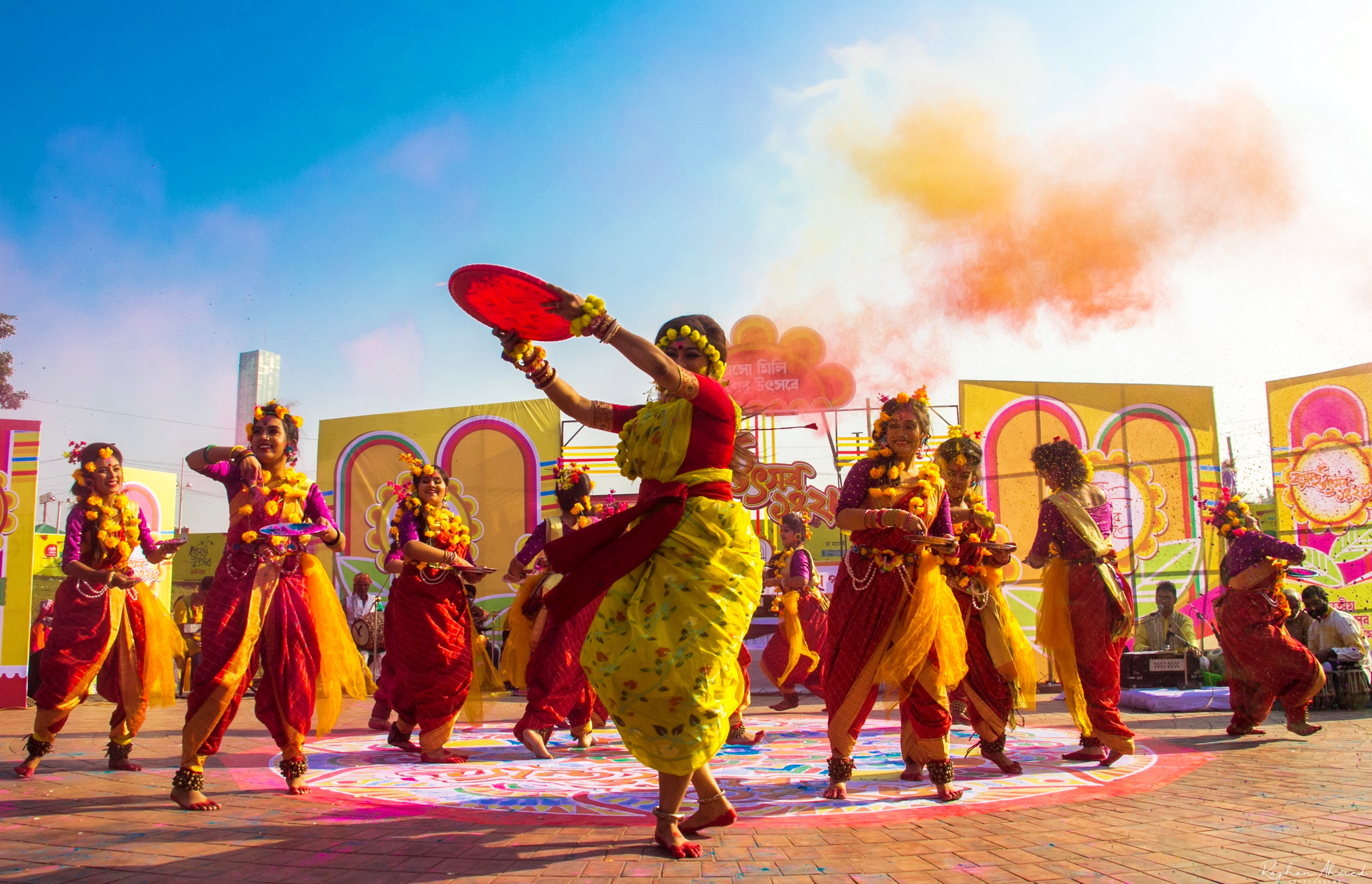
Woman in red and yellow sari dancing in the Pahela Falgun festival

Pohela Falgun (Bengali: পহেলা ফাল্গুন), or Poyla Falgun (পয়লা ফাল্গুন), is a festival observed on the first day of Spring of the Bengali month of Falgun in Bangladesh.

The celebration was started in 1991 by students of Dhaka University's Faculty of Fine Arts. Before 2019, the first day of Falgun fell on 13 February in the Gregorian calendar; however, from 2020 onward, due to revisions to the Bangladeshi calendar, Pohela Falgun has been celebrated on 14 February, coinciding with Valentine's Day in the country.

The National Spring Celebration Council is responsible for organizing the event. The celebration starts with chorus of traditional Bangladeshi music in the morning. On this day, people are seen to wear colourful traditional clothes such as sari and punjabi. Some young women also prefer to wear bangles, teeps and floral ornaments.

== Etymology ==
In Bengali, Pohela stands for 'first' and 'Falgun' is the eleventh month of the Bengali calendar.

== See also ==
- Pohela Boishakh
- Culture of Bangladesh
- Festivals of Bangladesh
- Festivals of West Bengal
