= Gombhira =

Traditional Bengalese song form

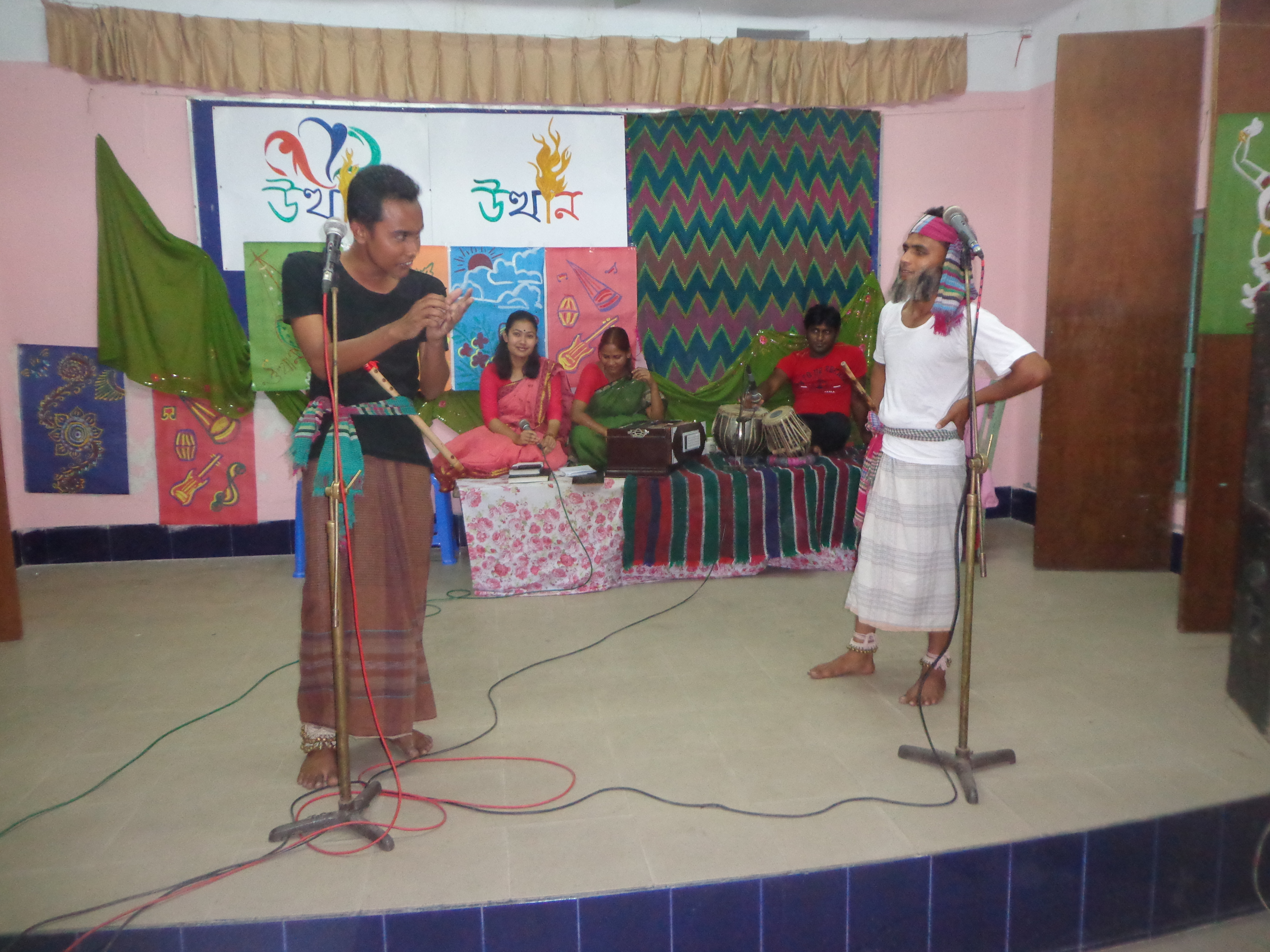
- Stylistic origins: Chapainawabganj, Maldah District

Gombhira, Gambhira or Gamvira (Bengali: গম্ভীরা) is a type of Bengali folk song and dance originating in the Bengal region, from what is known today as northwestern Bangladesh and north eastern West Bengal, India.

In West Bengal (India), gombhira performances are centred around the Malda District whereas Chapai Nawabganj District is the main centre of Gambhira performances in Bangladesh. The tradition is also popular in the nearby districts of Rajshahi and Naogaon. It is performed with a particularly distinctive rhythm and dance with two performers, always personifying a man and his maternal grandfather, discussing a topic to raise social awareness.

== Gambhira mask ==
The Gambhira dance is performed all over the Malda district of North Bengal during the festival of Chaitra Sankranti. The masks for Gambhira dance are made out of neem and fig trees by the local Bengali Sutradhar community. Sometimes they were also made the mask of clay.

== Performance ==
Gambhira songs frequently employ biting satire to mock and ridicule people, even those who are powerful and are in attendance.

== See also ==
- Masks of West Bengal
- Folk Music Festivals in Bangladesh
