= Rabindra Jayanti =

Commemorating the birth anniversary of Rabindranath Tagore

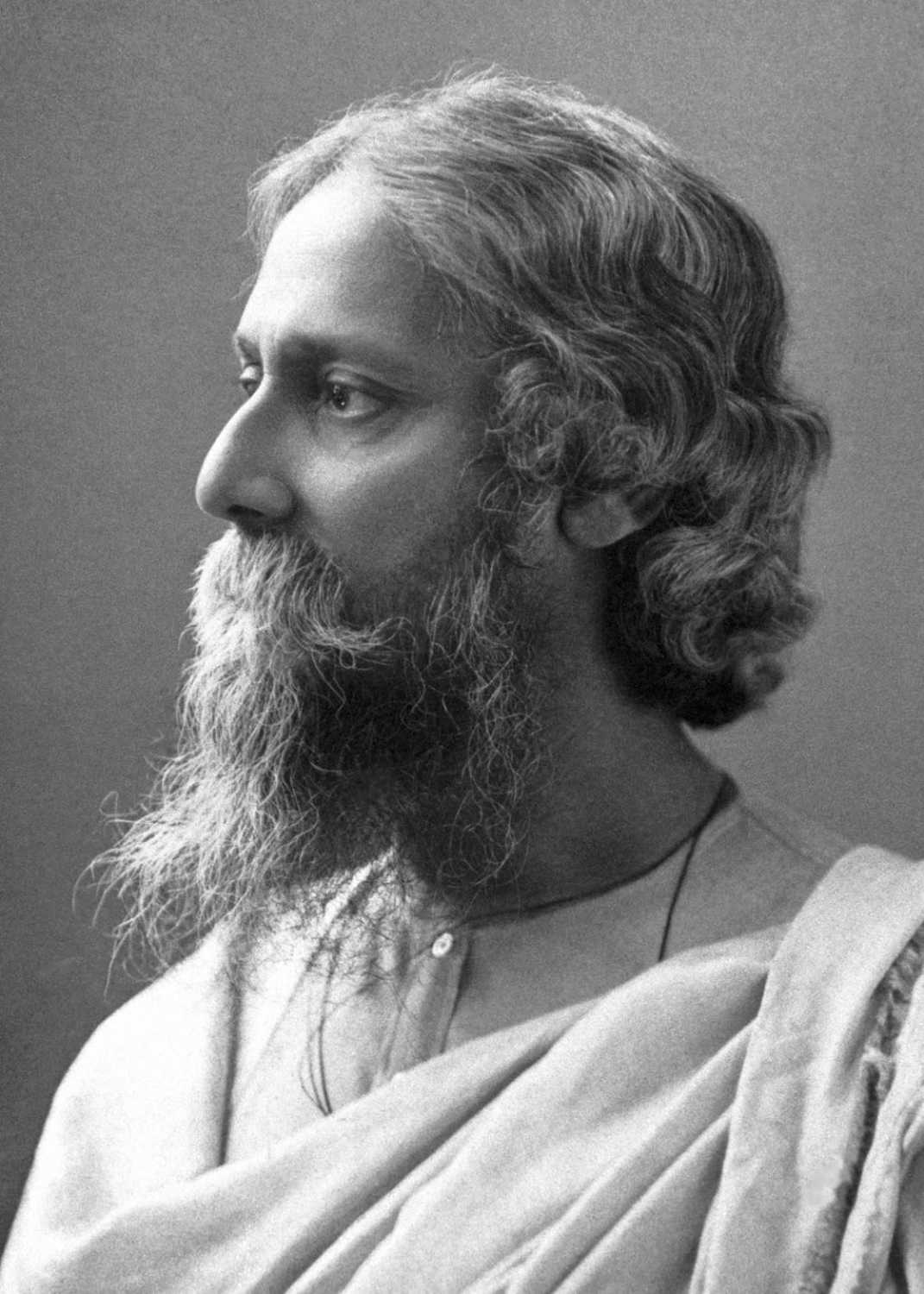
- Rabindranath Tagore
- Observed by: Bengalis
- Type: Bengali festival
- Date: 25th day of Boishakh
- Frequency: Annually

Rabindra Jayanti or Rabindranath Tagore Jayanti is an annually celebrated cultural festival, prevalent among Tagorephiles (people who love Tagore and his works) around the world, in remembrance of Rabindranath Tagore's birthday anniversary. In all over India, it is celebrated on the 7th of May, and in the Indian state West Bengal and Bangladesh, it is celebrated in early May, on the 25th day of the Bengali month of Boishakh, since Tagore was born on this day of the year 1268 of the Bengali calendar (1861 AD). Every year, numerous cultural programmes and events, such as: Kabipranam – the songs (Rabindra Sangeet), poetries, dances and dramas, written and composed by Tagore, are organised in this particular day, by various schools, colleges and universities in Bengal, and is also celebrated by different groups abroad, as a tribute to Tagore and his works. Throughout the globe, Tagore's birth anniversary is largely celebrated at Santiniketan, Birbhum in West Bengal, chiefly in Visva-Bharati University, the institution founded by Tagore himself for the cultural, social and educational upliftment of the students as well as the society. In 2011, the Government of India issued a five-rupee coin to mark the 150th anniversary of Rabindranath Tagore's birth.

== See also ==
- List of festivals in West Bengal
- List of festivals in Bangladesh
