= Bera Bhasan Festival =

Bengali festival

Bera Bhasan (বেরাভাসান) Festival, also known as the Khoja Khizri festival, is a festival that dates back to the Nawabs of Bengal and is hosted in Murshidabad district, in the district of West Bengal. During the time of the Mughal Empire, it was first a celebration held in honor of God Khoja Khizir, who was considered to be the god of water. This festival received support from the Nawabs. In the past, Bengali Hindus Sadagaras participated in a variety of trades, therefore their festivals and rituals from that time period were incorporated into it.

== Description ==
This festival is held on the final Thursday of the month of Bhadra (Hindu calendar) each year, and it is celebrated in the Bhagirathi -Ganga by floating rafts and boats that have been decked with multicolored lamps. JH Walsh writes in "A History of Murshidabad District" that this celebration was once held by Murshid Quli Khan. But he had no understanding that Murshid Quli Khan was leading to this event. It began in Dhaka in 1690, when Mukarram Khan was the Subedar of Bengal and Mughal King Jahangir was in power. After Murshid Quli Khan moved his capital from Dhaka to Murshidabad in 1704, it began here at Hazarduari Ghat. In front of the Hazarduari Palace, the ropes that connected the cannon to the gunnery hall were severed so that the rafts could be torn apart. The boats travel at a slow pace, and their music is timed to the rhythm of the water. Bamboo and banana tree trunks are used in their construction. One of the most important manufacturing centers for these kind of boats is located in Jafarganj, which is located in Murshidabad.

== Celebrations during Nawabi Period ==
During the Nawabi period, banana trees were floated on water, and bamboo-bakhari-chicha-mats were used to build items like minarets, arches, domes, niches, forts, etc. Mica sheets were often used to make lights that showed Quranic verses, churches, trees, and other things. On boats, silver-covered fake lights were hanging from the ceiling. The Ganges used to shine from Lalbagh in Murshidabad to Mahinagar. Different dance songs were set up. The Nawabs and their people loved the fireworks show.

== See also ==
- List of festivals in West Bengal
