= Bhatiali =

Bengali folk music

Bhatiali is a type of folk music which expresses the deep feeling from the heart of a group of local and professional people. It is based on their common and natural style of expression and uninfluenced by the rules of conventional music and contemporary songs. Bhatiali song expresses not only loss, pain and memory but also the human understanding of nature. Bhatiyali songs are a genre of folk ballads originating from the riverine regions of Bengal, which have a strong ecological connection.

Bhatiali or bhatiyali (Bengali: ভাটিয়ালি) is a form of bengali folk music, sung in both Bangladesh and West Bengal, India. The word 'Bhatiali' came from the bengali word "Bhata", which means the low tide of any river or ocean. The Bhatiali songs are basically sung by the boatmen who are known as "Majhi" or "Mallahs" while going down streams of the river.

It is mostly sung in several parts of greater riparian Bengal delta. Researchers have claimed Mymensingh District along the Brahmaputra River or the Bhati (lower region of a river) area of Bangladesh as its place of origin. Bhatiali lyrics traditionally consist of metaphorical and emotional verses and stories about the general village people who make their livelihood by depending on rivers or wetlands (Haor). Among the 14 subjects of folk music in Bangladesh and West Bengal, that includes Deha-tatva (about the body) and Murshid-tatva (about the guru), Bhatiali deals with Prakriti-tatva (about nature).

Notable collectors, composers and writers in the genre are Miraz Ali, Ukil Munshi, Rashid Uddin. Jalal Khan, Jang Bahadur, Shah Abdul Karim and Umed Ali. Between the 1930s and 1950s, Bhatiali has seen its golden age, when most of these personalities were contributing to the genre. Singer Abbas Uddin made the genre popular singing "Amay bhashaili re, amay dubaili re" and other popular numbers. In the 2000s, Malay Ganguly and Bari Siddiqui were two most prominent Bhatiali singers.

In the contemporary subcontinental music scene, Saurav Moni is also eminently known as an international Bhatiali performer from India. He hails from Hingalganj, the southernmost part of West Bengal. He unearthed a distinct style of Bhatiali from Southern Bengal and added it to the mainstream Bhatiali, which could draw attention and expand the horizon of its exposure. Recently, Moni left the audience spellbound on the set of MTV Coke Studio (Season 1, 2011) singing a rare Bhatiali “Shara Raatro Nouka Baiya” along with the Bollywood singer, Shaan who sang “O Majhi re”. Saurav Moni performs on both national and international stages. He has presented Bhatiali in various festivals like Celtic Connections, Scotland Alchemy Festival, London Lok Sangeet Samoan, Delhi Shrewsbury Folk Festival, Jaypur Literature Festival, United Kingdom, France, and Australia etc. He is also known as a collector of rare folk songs, vocal archivist and researcher of unexplored folk genres of Bengal.

== See also ==
- Baul
- Bhati region
- Folk Music Festivals in Bangladesh
