= Barsha Utsab =

Day-long Monsoon salutation festival celebrated in Bangladesh

Barsha Utsab (Bengali: বর্ষা উৎসব Barṣā uṯsaba) also known an Barsha Mangal Utsab is a day-long Monsoon salutation festival celebrated in Bangladesh. The festival date is set according to the lunisolar Bengali calendar as the first day of its third month Asharh, usually falls on 15 June of the Gregorian Calendar. This day is marked with colourful celebration included singing performances, drama, poetry recitation, screening of cinemas on rain, puppet show, Hilsha Fest and many other programmes. Traditionally women wear sky blue saris to celebrate the first day of Wet season.

but most of all, during the Barsha Utshob, also known as "Barsha Bondona"- the main attraction is having a rain bath in the first rain of the year. wman, woman, children of all age take part in this festival and share in on the fun. the children in particular go around to collect mangoes that have fallen during the storm to later prepare "Aam Kushli"; a traditional food made with sour mangoes, chilies, spices, onions and masalas.

== See also ==
- Monsoon of South Asia
- Culture of Bangladesh
- Festivals of Bangladesh
- seasons of Bangladesh
