= Basanta Utsab =

Bengali spring festival celebrated in India

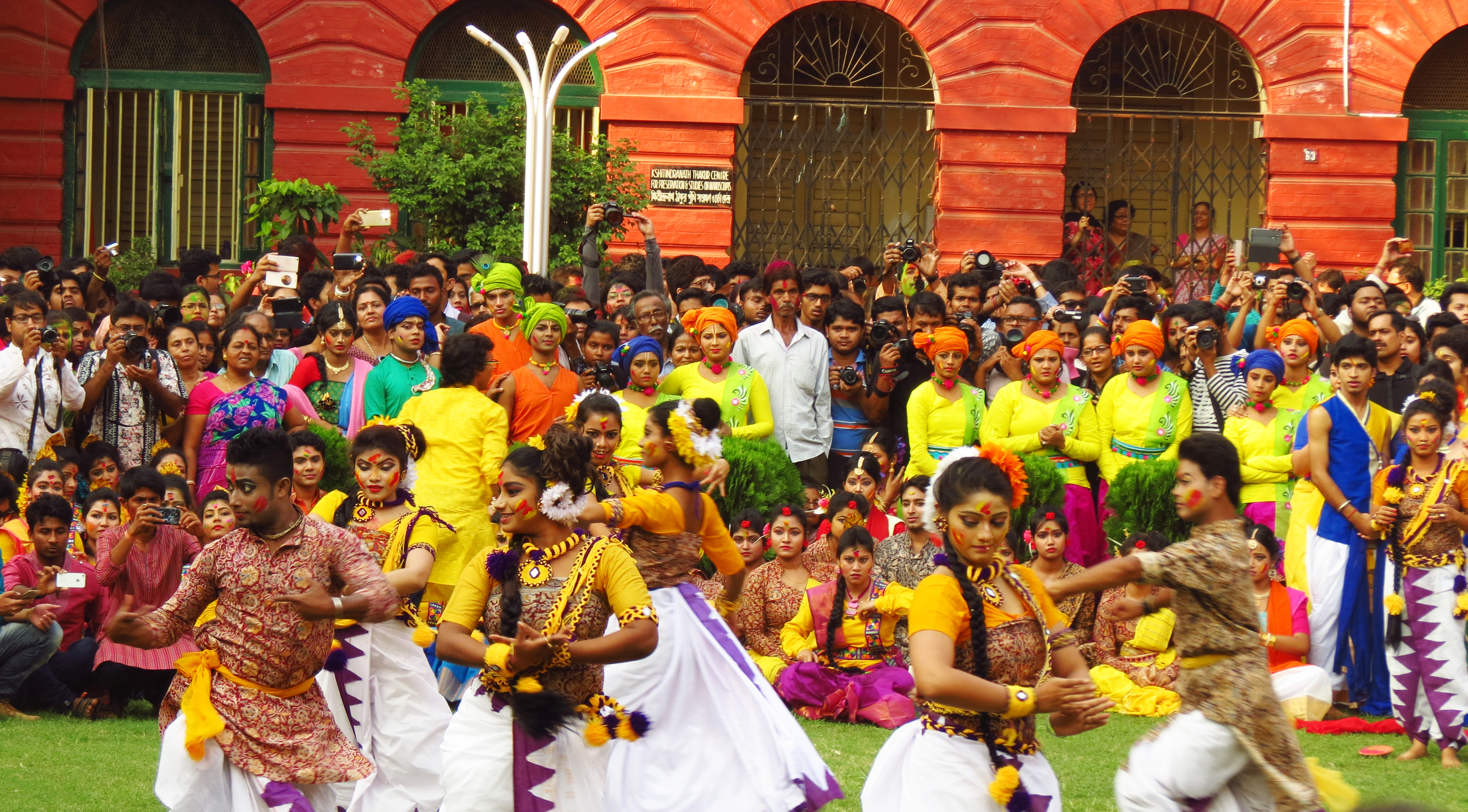
A view of the Basanta Utsab celebration held in Jorasanko Thakurbari in 2016.

Basanta Utsab (Bengali: বসন্ত উৎসব) is a Bengali spring festival predominantly celebrated in the Indian state of West Bengal. The festival is celebrated every year on the beginning day of Bengali month of Falgun. Celebrations of the festival are observed in West Bengal and Bengali-dominated areas of other Indian states; Shantiniketan, a neighbourhood of Bolpur town in West Bengal, sees the biggest celebration of the festival. This festival started in the third decade of the 20th century in Santiniketan of Bolpur in West Bengal. Rabindranath Tagore made the Basanta Utsab sacred and well-cultured. This festival showcases the elegant form of Holi and Bengal's own Dol Purnima.

== History ==
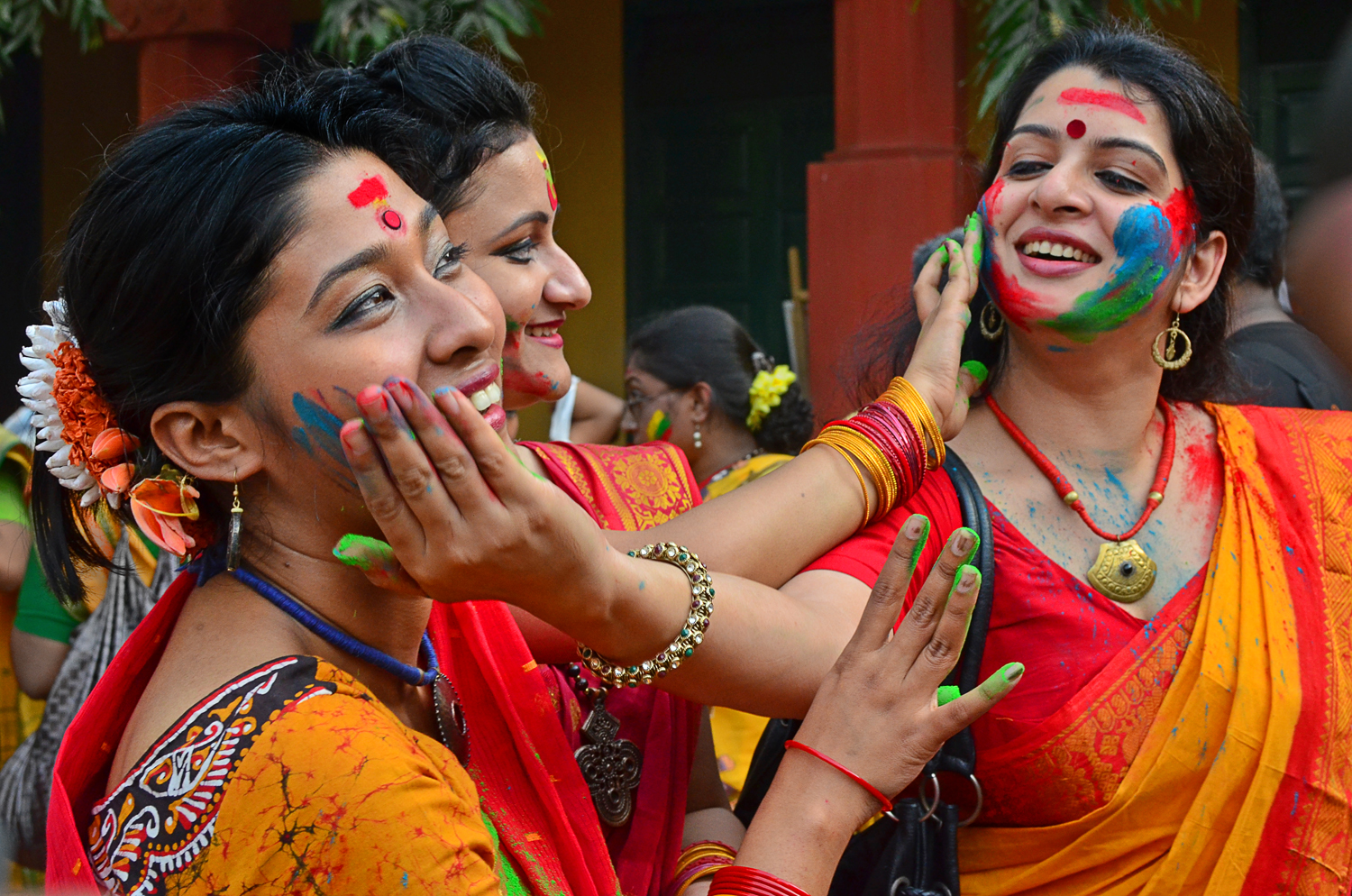
Women painting each-other's faces for Basanta Utsav

Shamindranath Tagore, son of Rabindranath Tagore, started Ritu-Utsab in 1907, but not held on Dol Purnima. Then at different times on different dates, the Ashram of Santiniketan celebrated Basanta. It was customary to circumambulate the ashram to sing spring songs.

In 1923, Basanta Utsab was started in Santiniketan; it was organized in Ashram-Sammilani session on Falguni Purnima. The festival has been organized regularly since 1923.
