= Jhulan Purnima =

Popular Vaishnavite festival

- Radha Krishna on swing
- Official name: Jhulan Purnima/ঝুলন পূর্ণিমা
- Observed by: Hindus, Vaishnavas
- Type: Hindu, Vedic
- Date: Shraavana Purnima
- Duration: 5 days
- Frequency: Annual
- Related to: Janmashtami

Jhulan Purnima, Jhulan Yatra or Hindola is a Hindu swinging festival that is dedicated to Hindu god Krishna and goddess Radha. It is popularly celebrated by the Hindu Vaishnava sect in the month of Shravana (July-August) which falls under the monsoon season in India when the weather is hot, humid and slightly breezy. This festival is known for its display of decorated swings, songs and dance. It is a joyful festival which celebrates the amour of divine couple Radha and Krishna along with the romantic fervor of the rainy season in India.

== Etymology ==
Hindola or Hiṇḍōla (हिंडॊल) is a Sanskrit word which means "a swing" or "swinging cradle". Hindola is also known as a special musical tune (raga) designed to accompany the act of swinging.

== Origin ==
Jhulan Yatra has been inspired from the swing pastimes of Krishna with the Gopis in Vrindavan. These pastimes are mentioned in literature such as the Bhagavata Purana, the Harivamsa, and the Gita Govinda. The metaphor of the swing of the monsoon or 'Sawan Ke Jhuley' have since been used by poets and songwriters to describe the romantic feeling that permeates the rainy season in the Indian subcontinent.

The popular Krishna literature Hari Bhakti Vilasa (Performance of Devotion to Hari or Krishna) mentions Jhulan Yatra as part of the various festivals dedicated to Krishna: "…the devotees serve the Lord during the summer by placing Him on the boat, taking Him out on a procession, applying sandalwood on His body, fanning Him with chamara, decorating Him with jeweled necklaces, offering Him palatable foodstuffs, and bringing Him out to swing Him in the pleasant moonlight."

== Celebrations ==
=== Mathura, Vrindavan, and Mayapur ===
Of all the places in India, Mathura, Vrindavan, and Mayapur are most famous for Jhulan Yatra celebrations. During the thirteen days of Jhulan— from the third day of the bright fortnight of the Hindu month of Shravan (July–August) until the full moon night of the month, called Shravan Purnima— thousands of Krishna devotees throng from around the world to the holy cities of Mathura and Vrindavan in Uttar Pradesh, and Mayapur in West Bengal, India. The idols of Radha and Krishna are taken out from the altar and placed on heavily decked swings, which are sometimes made of gold and silver. Vrindavan's Shri Rup-Sanatan Goudiya Math, Banke Bihari Temple and Radha-Ramana Temple, Mathura's Dwarkadhish temple, and Mayapur's ISKCON temple are some of the major places where this festival is celebrated in their greatest grandeur.

=== Orissa ===
In the Jaganath Temple, Puri and other shrines and mathas in Orissa, Jhulan Purnima is celebrated by swinging the image of Lord Jagannath to the accompaniment of music and dance. This is celebrated in the month of August for a week leading up to the full moon or Shravana Purnima.

=== ISKCON ===
Many Hindu organizations, especially the International Society for Krishna Consciousness, observe Jhulan Purnima for five days. At Mayapur, the world headquarters of the ISKCON, deities of Radha and Krishna are decorated and placed on an ornate swing in the temple courtyard for devotees to swing their favorite deities using a flowery rope while offering flower petals amid bhajans and kirtans. They dance and sing the popular hymns 'Hare Krishna Mahamantra,' 'Jaya Radhe, Jaya Krishna,' 'Jaya Vrindavan,' 'Jaya Radhe, Jaya Jaya Madhava' and other devotional songs. A special 'aarti' ritual is performed after the deities are placed on the swing, as devotees bring their 'bhog' or food offerings for the divine couple.

Srila Prabhupada, the founder of ISKCON, prescribed the following rituals to honor Krishna on Jhulan Yatra: During these five days the deities' clothes should be changed daily, a nice prasad (food offering) be distribution, and sankirtan (group singing) should be performed. A throne may be constructed on which the deities (Radha and Krishna) can be placed, and swayed gently with accompanying music.

=== Pushtimarg ===
In the Pushtimarg Vaishnava sect, Hindola is celebrated for 15 days during the monsoon season. Elaborate hindolas or swings are decorated with different material for each day.

== Music ==
The songs that are sung in the accompaniment of this festival is sung in a special raga or metre called "hindola". Hindola, which were sung by saints like Premanand Swami, are sung accompanied by musical instruments during this festival.
