= Ghurni =

- Neighbourhood
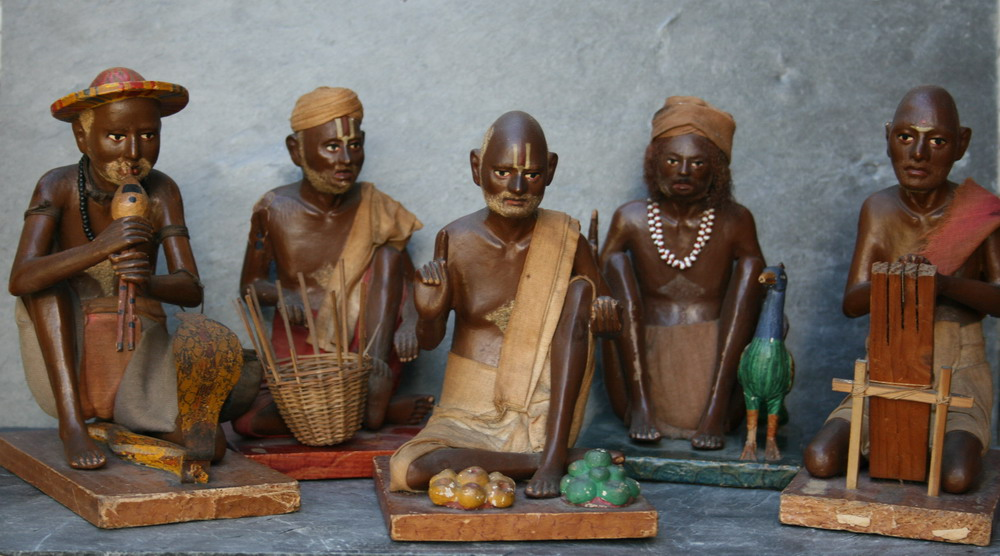
- Krishnanagar clay models

- Location in West Bengal, India Ghurni (India)
- Coordinates: 23.4286°N 88.5063°E
- Country: India
- State: West Bengal
- District: Nadia

Languages
  - Official: Bengali, English
- Time zone: UTC+5:30 (IST)
- Telephone/STD code: 03472
- Vehicle registration: WB51/52
- Lok Sabha constituency: Krishnanagar
- Vidhan Sabha constituency: Krishnanagar Uttar
- Website: nadia.gov.in

Ghurni is a neighbourhood of Krishnanagar in Nadia district in the Indian state of West Bengal. It is the centre for the production of clay dolls, often referred to as Krishnanagar clay dolls.

== Geography ==
Cities and towns in Krishnanagr Sadar subdivision of Nadia district
M: municipal town/ city, CT: census town, R: rural/ urban centre, H: place of historical/ religious interest, T: place of tourist interest.
Owing to space constraints in the small map, the actual locations in a larger map may vary slightly

=== Location ===
Ghurni is located at 23.4286°N 88.5063°E on the banks of the Jalangi River.

It can be reached from Kolkata by either train (100 km (62 mi)) or bus (118 km (73 mi)). Krishnanagar City is part of Kolkata Suburban Railway on the Sealdah – Naihati – Ranaghat – Krishnanagar line. Journey time is 2½ hours and one can return the same day. Cycle rickshaws, buses (town service) are available for travel within the city.

Note: The map alongside presents some of the notable locations in the subdivision. All places marked in the map are linked in the larger full screen map. All the four subdivisions are presented with maps on the same scale – the size of the maps vary as per the area of the subdivision.

== History ==
The old name of Krishnanagar was Rewe. In the early 17th century Bhabananda Majumdar founded the royal family of Nadia. Later, Maharaja Rudra changed the name to Krishnagar. In 1757, Maharaja Krishnachandra (1710–1783) helped the British East India Company against Siraj ud-Daulah in the Battle of Plassey. In 1728 he brought families of potters from Dhaka and Natore and settled them in Ghurni, then a village.

== Clay dolls ==
In an article, the Bangalore-based newspaper Deccan Herald writes, "We have clay dolls, toys and even clay sculptures in different parts of India. But there has been nothing to match the clay doll artisans of Krishnanagar in the Nadia district of West Bengal. The creations of these artists are displayed in most of the handicraft museums of the world. In India, we have a large display of these dolls in the Shankar’s Doll Museum in New Delhi. One look at the clay dolls and we are amazed at the reality with which the artist has displayed the character of the model. A horse rearing to gallop to a placid dog licking its lips after a hearty feed".

Exhibitions of Krishnagar dolls have been held in London, Paris and Boston. Ghurni clay models have won medals and certificates at international exhibitions.

=== Bronze casts ===
Some of the Ghurni artists have studied in art colleges in France and Italy, but theirs is a talent passed down through generations. Kartik Chandra Pal prepared clay models of statues of Mahatma Gandhi and Rabindranath Tagore. Based on his clay models bronze castings were made and have found pride of place in Washington DC and Moscow and were inaugurated by Bill Clinton and Mikhail Gorbachev, respectively.

=== Changing times ===
The clay modellers of Ghurni have fallen on bad days. The decline of feudal zemindari culture and loss of their patronage have adversely affected them. They are finding new patrons amongst NRIs, many of whom are acquiring clay models in large numbers.

Public preferences for clay models have shifted over time. Whereas demand had previously focused on literary figures and cultural icons such as Rabindranath Tagore and Kazi Nazrul Islam, it later shifted towards contemporary cricket players, including Sourav Ganguly, Sachin Tendulkar and Rahul Dravid. The popularity of these cricketers also surpassed that of religious figures such as Ramakrishna Paramahamsa, Baba Lokenath and Sai Baba.

The growing international market for fibreglass models has prompted some clay model makers in Ghurni to adopt fibreglass as an alternative material, despite the lack of adequate infrastructure for its production. Fibreglass is generally considered more durable and easier to mould than clay.

The number of master craftsmen is decreasing as members of the younger generation are switching over to more lucrative trades or more paying professions. In 2007, the number of master craftsmen staying at Ghurni dwindled to 10, most of them aged.

== Other achievements ==
Ghurni is one of the wards of Krishnanagar municipality which has started receiving piped arsenic-free water from 2006.

Women at Ghurni have formed co-operative societies with financial assistance from the funding agencies for the culture of ornamental fishes. Apart from their decorative value, these fishes fight mosquito-borne diseases and there is a potential export market in countries such as the US, Japan and China.
