= Kalpataru Day =

Hindu religious festival

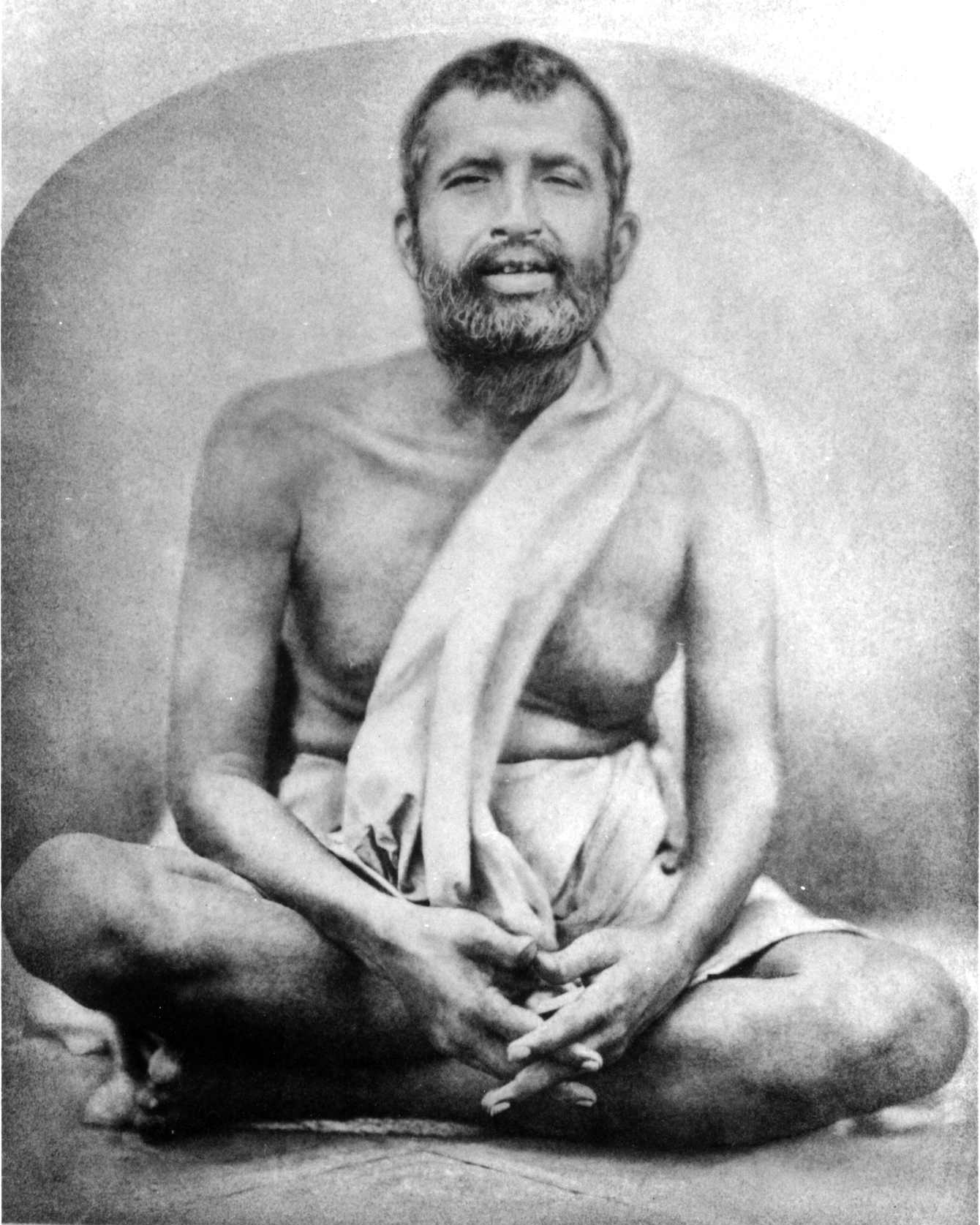
Ramakrishna

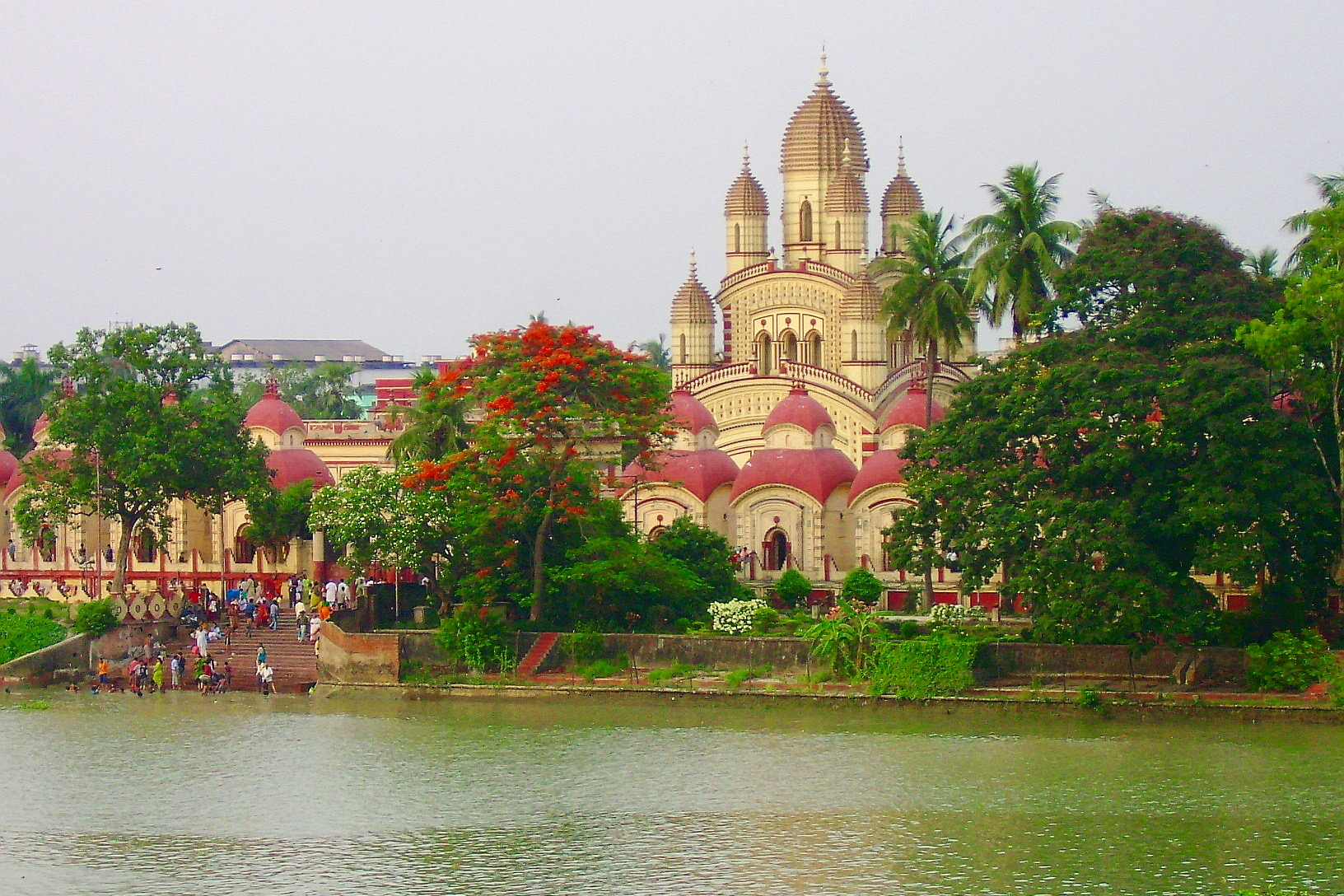
Dakshineswar Kali Temple

Kalpataru Day, also called Kalpataru Diwas or Kalpataru Utsav, is an annual religious festival held on 1 January each year. It is observed by monks of the Ramakrishna Math monastic order of Hinduism and lay followers of the associated Ramakrishna Mission, as well as the worldwide Vedanta Societies. These organizations follow the teachings of Ramakrishna, the 19th-century Indian mystic and figure in the Bengali Renaissance.

The event was named by his disciple Ramachandra Dutta and commemorates the day of 1 January 1886, which is when Ramakrishna is believed to have revealed himself to be an avatar, or God incarnate on Earth. The day carried meanings and memories of cosmic import for Ramakrishna's disciples and also prepared them for his death, which occurred a few months later on 16 August 1886.

Observances are held in several locations, most significantly at the Ramakrishna Math (Kashipur Udyanbati) at Cossipore, the place where Ramakrishna spent the last days of his life.
