= Liberation Docfest Bangladesh =

Film festival held in Dhaka, Bangladesh

Liberation DocFest Bangladesh
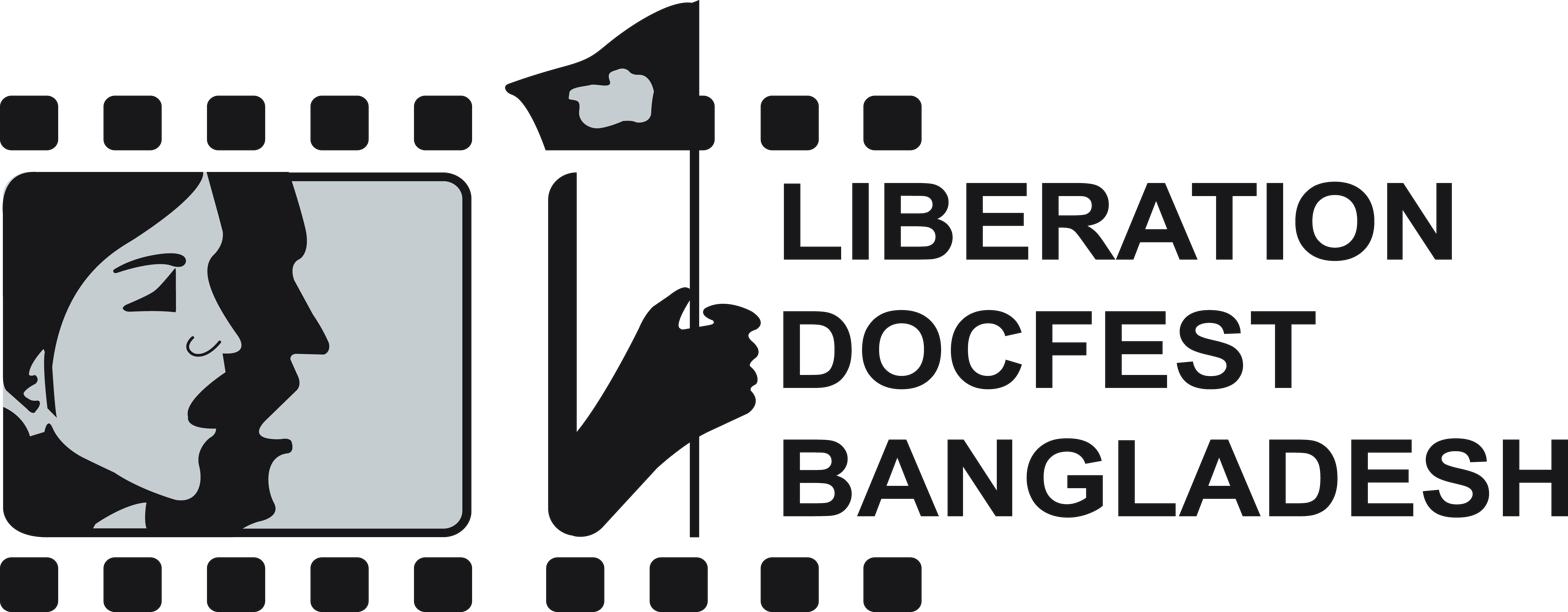
- Official logo of the festival
- Location: Dhaka, Bangladesh
- Founded: 2006
- Awards: 3
- Hosted by: Liberation War Museum
- Language: International
- Website: liberationdocfestbd.org

Liberation DocFest Bangladesh (Bengali: লিবারেশন ডকফেস্ট বাংলাদেশ) is an annual documentary film festival held in Dhaka, Bangladesh. Previously known as the International Festival of Docufilms on Liberation and Human Rights, it is one of the recognized film events in Bangladesh, dedicated to documentary cinema, seeking to highlight the struggle for the liberation and human rights of people in various parts of the world and its contemporary significance. The festival was established by the Liberation War Museum, a people's museum dedicated to highlighting the history of Bangladesh’s struggle for Independence.

== Awards ==
The festival authority invites films from all over the world to participate in different sections. The awards consist of award money, a crest and a certificate. The sections are:

- National Competition - The selection committee shortlists 5 films for this category from the Bangladeshi films submitted to the festival. Independent national juries judge this diverse selection and announce the best film. The National Best Film award carries a cash prize of BDT 100,000.
- International Competition - The film selection committee shortlists 7 films for this category from the various international films submitted to the festival. An independent international jury board evaluates these shortlisted films and announces the best film. The International Best Film award carries a cash prize of USD 1000.
- Youth Jury Award (National and International) - A jury board made up of young festival volunteers selects one national and one international film from the films submitted to the festival. Only certificates are presented as the Youth Jury Awards.

== Festival editions ==
The following is a list of all Liberation DocFest Bangladesh editions since 2006.

Edition	Dates	Best Film National	Best Film International	Notes	Sources
1st	2006				
2nd	2007				
3rd	2008				
4th	2009				
5th	2010				
6th	2011				
7th	April 18–22, 2019	Merciless Mayhem		Screened 35 films	
8th	June 16–20, 2020	Khunti (Road to Roots)	Highways of Life	Screened 70 films	
9th	June 08–12, 2021	Why Not	3 Logical Exits	Screened 110 films	
10th	March 11–15, 2022	The Revamp	POSTPONED	Screened 140 films from 48 countries	
11th	March 09–13, 2023	(No Award, only Jury Special Mention) Bokul's Saga	Karim	Screened 91 films from 39 countries	
12th	April 18–22, 2024	Taxibol	The Scrap	Screened 36 films from 22 countries	

== See also ==
- Dhaka International Film Festival
- Hill Film Festival
- National Film Awards (Bangladesh)
- Babisas Award
