= Music of West Bengal =

Overview of musical genres in Indian state of West Bengal

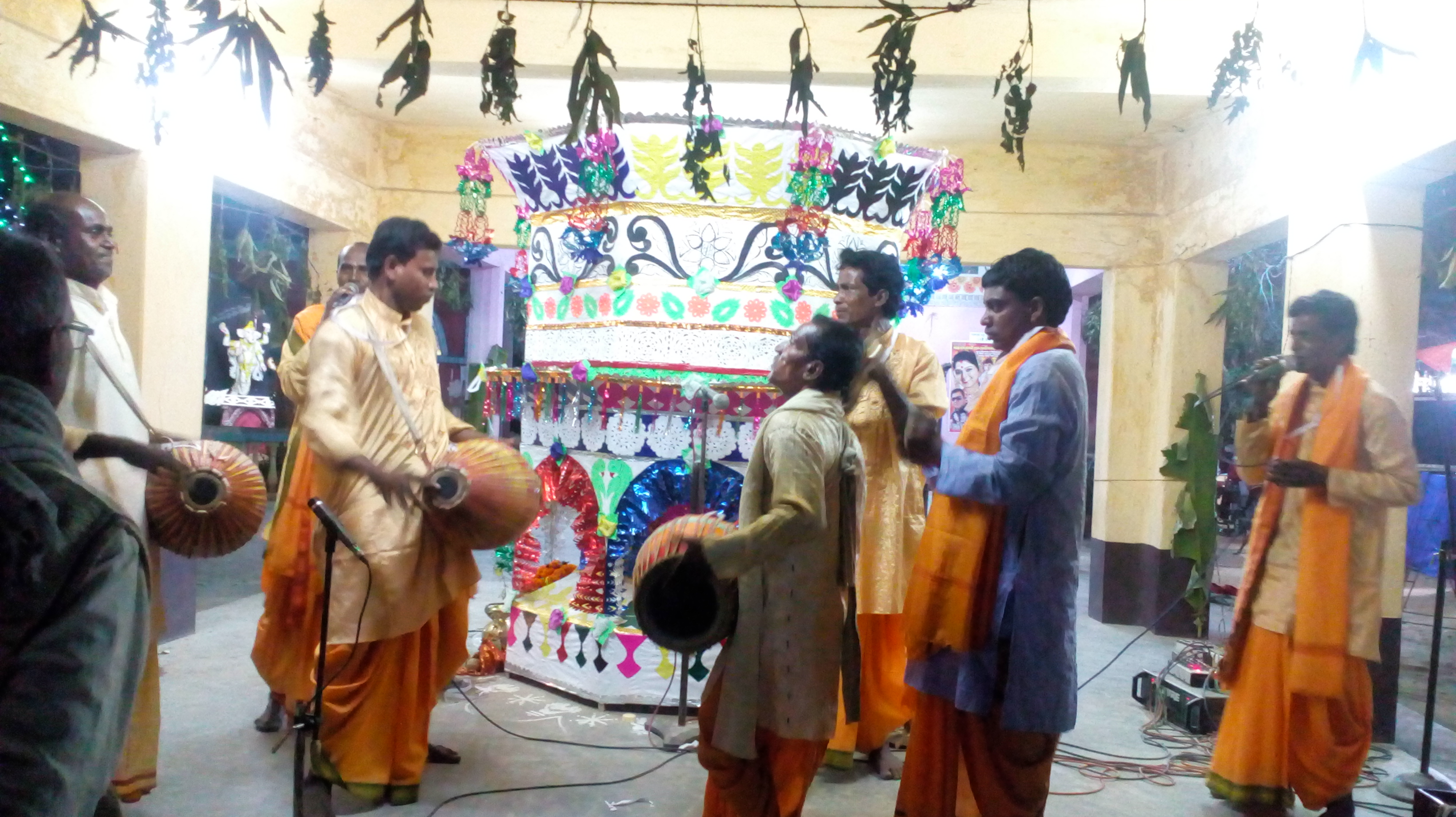
Kirtan, a Musical speciality of West Bengal

The music of West Bengal includes multiple indigenous musical genres such as Baul, Ramprasadi, Bishnupuri Classical, Kirtan, Shyama Sangeet, Rabindra Sangeet, Nazrul Geeti, Dwijendrageeti, Prabhat Samgiita, Agamani-Vijaya, Patua Sangeet, Gambhira, Bhatiali, Bhawaiya, Bengali Rock.

== Classical music ==
=== Ragapradhan Gaan ===
Bengali classical music is based on modes called ragas. In composing these songs, the melodies of North Indian ragas are used. As far as the Charyagiti (9th century), ragas have been used in Bengali music. Jaydev's Gita Govinda, Padavali Kirtan, Mangal Giti, Shyama sangeet, Tappa, Brahma Sangeet and Tagore songs have been inspired by Ragas. The use of North Indian ragas in Bangla songs began in 18th century. This trend gathered momentum during the 19th and 20th centuries. The pioneers of these trend were Ramnidhi Gupta of North Kolkata, Kali Mirza of Hooghly, Raghunath Roy and the founder of the Bishnupur Gharana, Pandit Ramshanker Bhattacharya of Bankura. Nawab of Lucknow, Wajid Ali Shah played an important role in this trend. He was dethroned by the British Empire in 1856 and banished to Metiaburuz, Kolkata in present-day West Bengal. During his 30-year exile, he patronized music, specially dhrupad, tappa, thumri and kheyal. And, thus made a lasting impact on Bengali music. All traditional Bengali music tend to be based on various variations of Hindustani classical music. Rabindranath Tagore had a deep appreciation for north Indian ragas, successfully introduced ragas in his songs. He was followed by Dwijendralal Ray, Rajanikanta Sen and Atulprasad Sen.

=== Bishnupur Gharana ===
The Bishnupur Gharana is the sole Classical (Drupad) gharana of Bengal. It originated in Bishnupur, Bankura, West Bengal by the court musicians of the Malla Kings. Bahadur Khan of Delhi, a descendant of the Tansen, was the father of Bishnupur Gharana. Bahadur Khan was brought to Bishnupur by Malla King Raghunath Singha II.

== Rabindra Sangeet ==
Rabindra Sangeet (Bengali: রবীন্দ্রসঙ্গীত Robindro shonggit, Bengali pronunciation: [ɾobindɾo ʃoŋɡit]), also known as Tagore Songs, are songs written and composed by Rabindranath Tagore. They have distinctive characteristics in the music of Bengal, popular in India and Bangladesh.

Rabindra Sangeet has been an integral part of Bengal culture for over a century. Indian social reformer Swami Vivekananda became an admirer of Rabindra Sangeet in his youth. He also composed music in the Rabindra Sangeet style, for example Gaganer Thale in Raga Jaijaivanti.

== Shyama Sangeet ==
Shyama Sangeet(Bengali: শ্যামা সঙ্গীত) is a genre of Bengali devotional songs dedicated to the Hindu goddess Shyama or Kali which is a form of supreme universal mother-goddess Durga or parvati. It is also known as Shaktagiti or Durgastuti.

Generally all music dedicated to goddess Mother Kali is called 'Shyama Sangeet' in Bengali. Two famous singers of this Bengali Shyama Sangeet are Pannalal Bhattacharya and Dhananjay Bhattacharya. Pannalal Bhattacharya's elder brother Prafulla Bhattacharya and middle brother Dhananjay Bhattacharya were the first music teachers of saint artist Pannalal Bhattacharya. Dhananjay Bhattacharya stopped singing devotional songs after finding devotional spirit in his brother Pannalal. However, after the demise of Pannalal Bhattacharya, he contributed again in Bengali music with many devotional songs by his sweet, melodious voice.

=== Ramprasadi ===
Ramprasadi (Bengali : রামপ্রসাদী) is a category of Shyama Sangeet composed by eighteenth century Bengali saint-poet Sadhak Rāmprasād Sen (Bengali: রামপ্রসাদ সেন; c. 1718 or c. 1723 – c. 1775). They are usually addressed to Hindu goddess Kali and written in Bengali language.

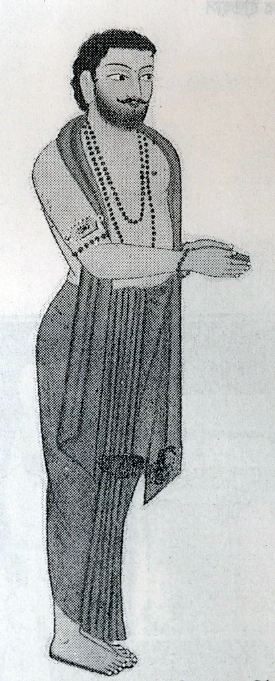
Ramprasad Sen

Ramprasad Sen was the first Shakta poet to address Goddess Kali with such as intimate devotion and to sing of her as a tender loving mother or even as a little girl. Ramprasad is credited with creating a new compositional form that combined the Bengali folk style of Baul music with classical melodies and kirtan. The new style took root in Bengali culture with many poet-composers combining folk and raga-based melodies, mixing every common style of music from classical to semi-classical and folk. His songs are sung today, with a popular collection—Ramprasadi Sangeet ("Songs of Ramprasad")—sold at Shakta temples and pithas in Bengal. After him, a school of shakta poets continued the Kali-bhakti tradition. Krishna Chandra Roy, Siraj ud-Daulah, Rabindranath Tagore, Kazi Nazrul Islam were immensely inspired by the songs of Ramprasad. Many of his songs have been sung by renowned Shyama sangeet singers of West Bengal like Dhananjay Bhattacharya, Pannalal Bhattacharya and Anup Ghoshal as well as popular Indian singers like Manna Dey, Hemanta Mukherjee, Kumar Sanu, Srikanta Acharya, Anuradha Paudwal, and Sadhana Sargam. These songs are still very popular in West Bengal.

== Agamani-Vijaya ==
Agamani (Bengali: আগমনী গান Āgōmōni gān "Songs of advent") and Vijaya (বিজয়া গীতি Bījōyā gīţi "Songs of parting") are genres of Bengali folk songs celebrating the return of the Goddess Parvati to the home of her parents on the eve of the Hindu autumn festival of Durga Puja. The Aagamani songs describe the return of Parvati to her home in rural Bengal, not as Goddess but as daughter, and are followed by Vijaya songs which describe the sorrow of separation three days later as Parvati returns to her husband Shiva.

== Atulprasadi ==
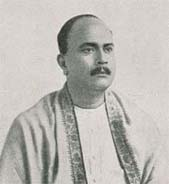
Atulprasad Sen.

Atulprasadi (Bengali: অতুলপ্রসাদী) or the Songs of Atulprasad Sen (1871–1934), one of the major lyricist and composers of early-modern period, is also widely popular in Paschimbanga. Atul Prasad is credited with introducing the Thumri style in Bengali music. His songs centred on three broad subjects – patriotism, devotion and love.

== Dwijendrageeti ==
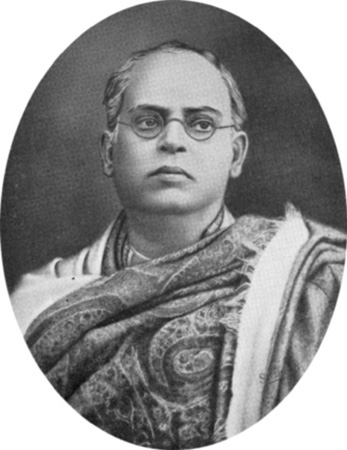
Dwijendra Lal Roy

Dwijendrageeti (Bengali: দ্বিজেন্দ্রগীতি) or the Songs of Dwijendra Lal Roy (1863–1913), which number over 500, create a separate subgenre of Bengali music. The patriotic songs of Dwijendra Lal Roy are very popular in West Bengal.

== Paramartha Sangeet ==
Paramartha Sangeet is a collection of devotional songs, which were composed and sung by Maharshi Nagendranath Bhaduri, a renowned yogi and spiritual figure.

Nagendranath Bhaduri founded "Sanatana Dharma Pracharini Sabha" in 1891, a society dedicated to spreading the message of Sanatana Dharma. This organization, later known as "Nagendra Math" under the guidance of his disciple Dhyanaprakash Brahmachari, published a compilation of songs called Paramartha Sangitabali. This compilation includes three songs composed by Nagendranath himself, which were reportedly sung in the presence of Ramakrishna.

== Prabhat Samgiita ==
Prabhat Samgiita (Bengali: প্রভাত সঙ্গীত), also known as Songs of a New Dawn or Prabhat's Songs, are songs composed by Prabhat Ranjan Sarkar. Sarkar composed a total of 5,018 songs, including the lyrics and the tune, in a period of eight years from 1982 until his death in 1990, making using of eight different languages: Bengali, Hindi, English, Sanskrit, Urdu, Magahi, Maithili and Angika.

== Patua Sangeet ==
Patua Sangeet or Poter Gan is a cultural tradition of Bengal Patachitra in West Bengal. It is performed by the Patuas. It is famous in the southern and south-western districts of West Bengal like Birbhum, Jhargram, Bardhaman and Murshidabad as folk song. There are three types of Patua Sangeet according to the difference of Patachitra and the mythological stories associated with it. This lyrical drama written about the Krishno leela, Gourango Leela, Ram Leela, Shib-Parboti Lila etc., is called Leela kahini. Gopalan or Cattlefarming story is another type of Patua Sangeet.

== Gombhira ==
In West Bengal, gombhira performances are centred around the Malda District in Northern part of West Bengal. It is performed with a particularly distinctive rhythm and dance with two performers, always personifying a man and his maternal grandfather, discussing a topic to raise social awareness. The Gambhira dance along with Gambhira Song is performed all over the Malda district of North Bengal during the festival of Chaitra Sankranti. For this festival Gambhira masks are made out of neem and fig trees by the local Sutradhar community. Sometimes the masks are also made out of clay. Gambhira dance is performed along with Gombhira song wearing these masks. The songs of Gambhira originated among the Hindu community of Maldah in West Bengal, completely in its theme formation.

== Bhadu Gaan ==
Bhadu is a social festival of South-Western part of West Bengal. The festival starts from the first day of Bhadro, the fifth month in Bengali Calendar and continues till the end of the month. Bhadu gaan, an inseparable part of Bhadu festival reflects the colours of rural society. It is popular in Purulia, Paschim Bardhaman, Bankura, Paschim Midnapore and Birbhum districts of West Bengal. Bhadu songs are composed extemporaneously and sung on each night of the festival, depicts the Goddesses as young girls. They describe Bhadu and tell in loving detail how they will be entertained. Since Bhadu is unmarried, her songs are sung mostly by unmarried girls. Dancing and playing drums accompanies Bhadu.

== Tusu Gaan ==
Tusu is a folk festival held on the last day of the Bengali month of Poush. It is a unifying form of local common faith and the joy of the harvest. Tusu is a cosmic goddess and conceived as a virgin girl, who imagined as a young girl and is worshipped by Tusu song improvised by womenfolk, based on popular beliefs as well as rituals associated with harvesting. At the end of the festivities, the immersion of the image of Tusu is done vividly and with Tusu songs which have a melancholic ring. Tusu puja is practised and Tusu songs are sung in the rural areas of Bankura, Purulia, Bardhaman and Hooghly districts of West Bengal.

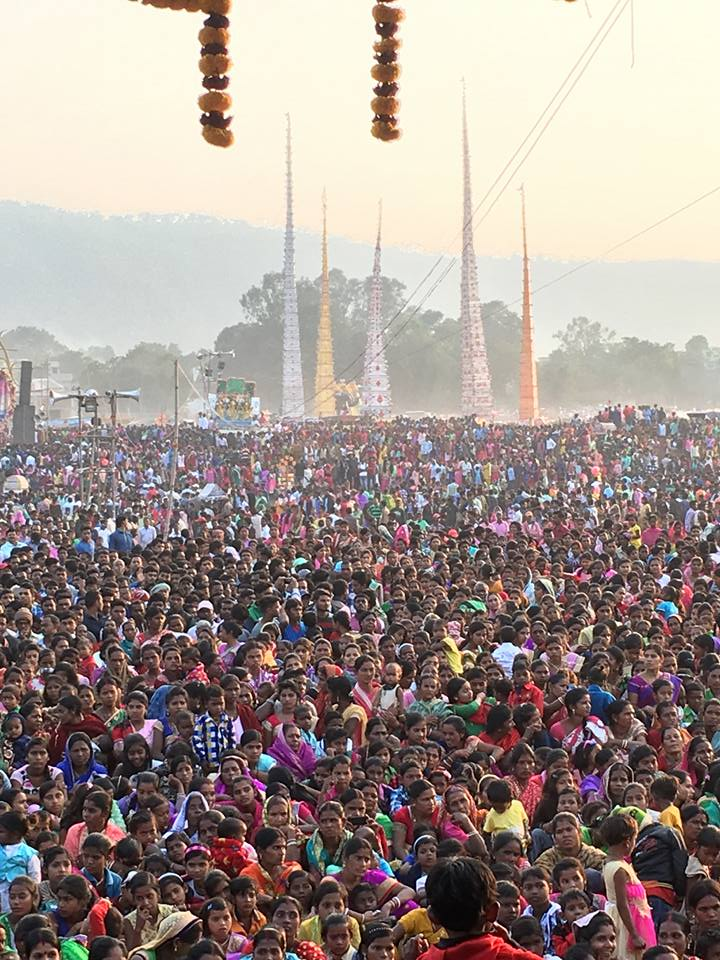
Crowd in Tusu Festival

== Jhumur ==
This type of folk song is very popular in Purulia, Birbhum, Bankura, Purba Midnapur and Paschim Midnapore districts of West Bengal.

== Bolan Gaan ==
Bolan or Bolan Gaan is a type of folk song of West Bengal which was once very popular in large areas of Birbhum, Nadia, Burdwan and Murshidabad districts of West Bengal.

== Bhawaiya ==
Bhawaiya is a musical form or a popular folk music that originated in Northern Bengal, especially in Cooch Behar district of West Bengal, India, Goalpara district of Assam, India and Rangpur Division in Bangladesh. A "working class" music, with the recurring figures of mahouts(মাহুত) (elephant trainers and catchers), mahishals (মইষাল)(buffalo herders) and gariyals(গাড়িয়াল)(cart drivers) the lyrics of these songs express pangs of separation and loneliness of their womenfolk, with elongated tones accentuating pain, longing and "deep emotion". Generally believed to have originated in the 16th century under the Koch king Vishwa Singha, it has evolved into stage performances since the 1950s and more widely since the 1990s. The lyrics of Bhawaiya songs are non-denominational.

== Bhatiali ==
Bhatiali or bhatiyali (Bengali: ভাটিয়ালি) is a form of folk music in both West Bengal and Bangladesh. Bhatiali is a river song mostly sung by boatmen while going down streams of the river. The word bhatiyali comes from bhata meaning "ebb" or downstream.

== Alkap ==
Alkap (Bengali: আলকাপ) is a form of Bengali folk performance popular in the districts of Murshidabad, Malda and Birbhum in West Bengal.

== Band music and Bengali rock ==
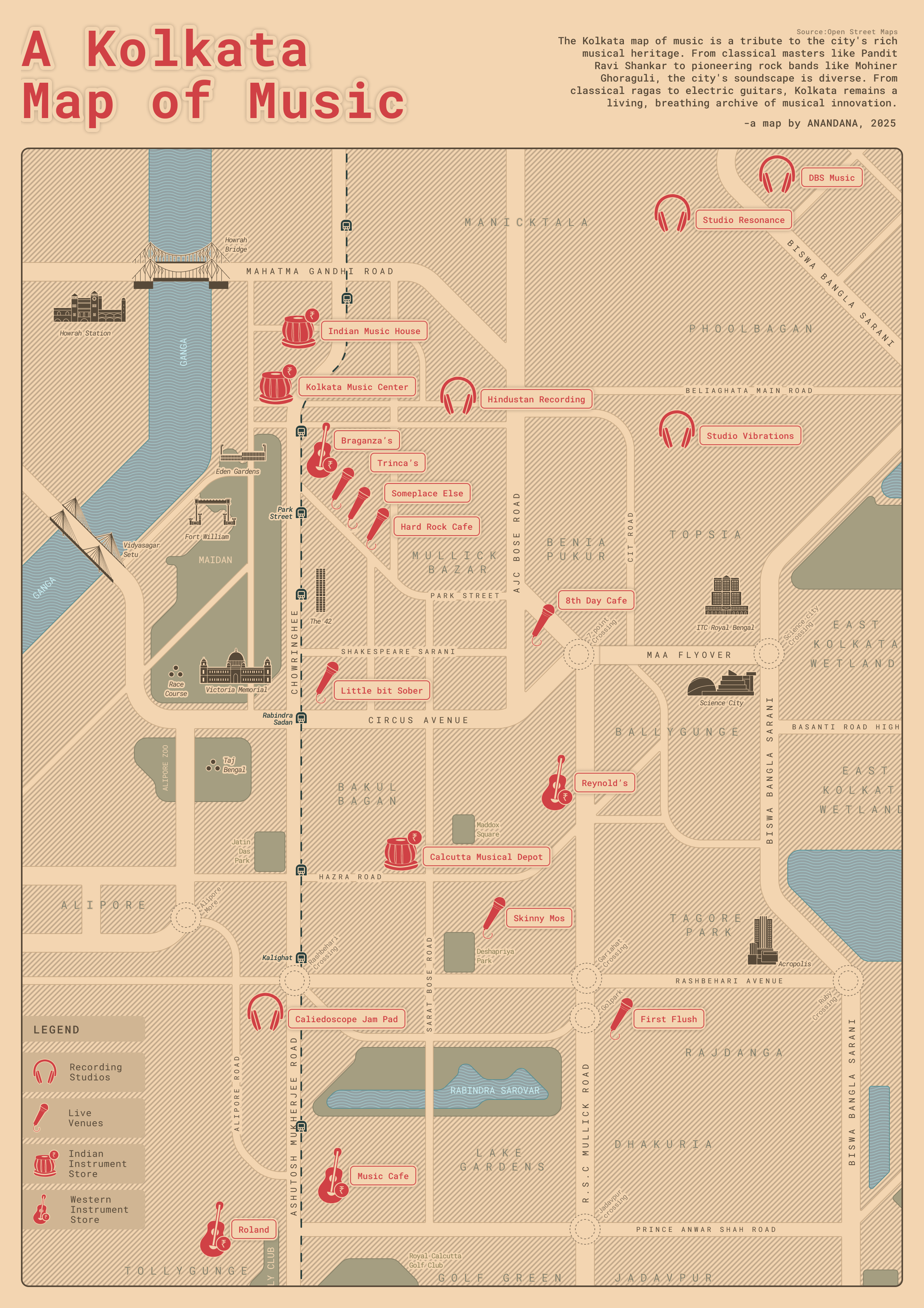
A Schematic map of Kolkata showing some relevant music landmarks by Anandana Dutta

Popular Rock Bands

Year formed	Band name	Genre	Language
1975	Moheener Ghoraguli	Bengali rock	Bengali
1990	Krosswindz	Bengali rock, fusion	Bengali, English, Hindi
1991	Chandrabindoo	Bengali rock	Bengali
1992	Cactus	Bengali rock, hard rock	Bengali
1996	Hip Pocket	Rock, hard rock	English
1998	Fossils	Bengali rock, hard rock, metal	Bengali, English, Hindi
1998	Kalpurush	Bengali Rock, Bengali Pop, Rock, Pop	Bengali, Hindi
1999	Bhoomi	Bengali rock	Bengali
1999	Skinny Alley	Rock, alternative rock	English
1999	Lakkhichhara	Bengali rock	Bengali
2001	Cassini's Division	Rock, alternative rock	English
2002	Insomnia	Bengali rock, alternative, nu metal	English, Bengali
2005	Rikterskale	Bangla Rock	
2005	Prithibi	Bengali rock	Bengali
2005	Agnish	Bengali Rock, Hard rock, Rock n Roll	Bengali
2005	Calcutta Blues	Bengali rock	Bengali
2006	Destiny	Progressive, neo-classical	
2006	Pinknoise	Experimental rock, alternative rock	English
2006	Pseudonym	Alternative rock, hard rock	English
2006	Kanvas	Alternative rock, Folk rock	Bengali, Hindi
2007	Five Little Indians	Alternative rock	English
2008	soul unity of rhythm	Alternative rock	Bengali
2009	Kendraka	Jazz rock	
2010	Underground Authority	Alternative rock, rap rock, hard rock	Hindi, English, Bengali
2012	RobiONobin	Folk rock	
2013	Lotus Eater	Country, Alternative rock, rap rock soft rock, folk fusion, rock 'n' roll	Hindi, English, Bengali https://web.archive.org/web/20150218104000/http://www.fruithuntt.com/lotus-eater/
2014	Cross Chords	Experimental Rock, Progressive Rock, Metal	Bengali, English
	Parama		
	Aurko		
2015	the troubadours	Folk, Blues, mainly known for their Protest songs, such as 'Raasta ta howa dorkar'	Bengali, English

== See also ==
- Tamang Selo
- Bengali folk literature
- Culture of Bengal
- Culture of West Bengal
- Music of Bangladesh
- Music of Bengal
- Baul
- Nazrul Geeti

== Bibliography ==
- Ayyappapanicker, K. (1997). Medieval Indian Literature: Surveys and selections. Sahitya Akademi. p. 64. ISBN 978-81-260-0365-5.
- Bhowmik, Dulal (2012). "Agamani-vijaya". In Islam, Sirajul; Jamal, Ahmed A. (eds.). Banglapedia: National Encyclopedia of Bangladesh (Second ed.). Asiatic Society of Bangladesh.
- Datta, Amaresh (2006). The Encyclopaedia Of Indian Literature Vol 1. Sahitya Akademi. ISBN 81-260-1803-8.
- Dutta, Soumik (24 December 2019). "The Solitude of Love: Nature, Culture and Womanhood in Bhawaiya Songs". Sahapedia. Archived from the original on 6 July 2020.
- Martin, Nancy M. (2003). "North Indian Hindi Devotional Literature". In Gavin D. Flood (ed.). The Blackwell companion to Hinduism. Wiley-Blackwell. ISBN 978-0-631-21535-6.
- McDaniel, June (2004). Offering Flowers, Feeding Skulls. Oxford University Press. ISBN 978-0-19-516790-0.
- Sarma, Simona; Monteiro (2019). "Contemporary 'Folk' Dynamics: Shifting Visions and Meanings in the Goalpariya Folk Music of Assam". Folklore. 130 (4): 331–351. doi:10.1080/0015587X.2019.1622923. S2CID 213283007.
