= Krishnarao Shankar Pandit =

Indian musician (1894–1989)

Pt. Krishnarao Shankar Pandit
- Born: 26 July 1893; Gwalior, Madhya Pradesh, India
- Died: 22 August 1989 (aged 96); Gwalior, Madhya Pradesh, India
- Occupations: Musician; Vocalist
- Known for: Gwalior gharana
- Children: 3
- Awards: Padma Bhushan; Sangeet Natak Akademi Award; Tansen Award; Sangeet Bhishmacharya; Akashwani Award; Shikhar Samman; Gaan Maharishi; Bhuwalka Award; Swar Vilas

Gaan Maharishi Pt. Krishnarao Shankar Pandit (1894–1989) was an Indian musician, considered by many as one of the leading vocalists of the Gwalior gharana. He authored several articles and 8 books on music and was the founder of Shankar Gandharva Mahavidyalaya, a music college based in Gwalior. The Government of India awarded him the third highest civilian honour of the Padma Bhushan, in 1973, for his contributions to music. He was also a recipient of several other honors, including the 1959 Sangeet Natak Akademi Award and the 1980 Tansen Award of the Government of Madhya Pradesh.

== Biography ==
Krishnarao Pandit was born on 26 July 1893 in Gwalior, a town known for its musical tradition, in the Indian state of Madhya Pradesh, to a notable musician by name, Shankarrao Pandit. His early music training was under his father as well as the father-son duo of Nathu Khan and Nissar Hussain Khan and learnt Khyal, Tappa, Tarana and Layakari genres of vocal renditions. After his debut performance aged 11, he started his solo career at the age of 14 as one of the younger musicians of the Gwalior durbar. In 1914, at the age of 18, he founded Shankar Gandharva Mahavidyalaya, a music college, which has since become a recognized music institution. Six years later, he was appointed as the State Musician of the Satara Principality but he returned to Gwalior after one year.

Pandit was credited with designing the curriculum for vocal and instrumental music for which he wrote eight text books and several articles. He tutored many notable singers including his two sons, Laxman Krishnarao Pandit and Chandrakant Pandit, and Meeta Pandit, his grand daughter. However, he continued his concerts without break and many of his renditions have been archived. In 1959, he received the Sangeet Natak Akademi Award for Hindustani music and Indira Kala Sangeet University honoured him with a doctorate, three years later. The Government of India included him the Republic Day Honours list for the civilian award of the Padma Bhushan in 1973, the same year as he received the Shikhar Samman from the Government of Madhya Pradesh. The state government honoured him again in 1980 with the Tansen Award. He is also a recipient of honours such as Akashwani Award, Swar Vilas title of Sursingar Samsad, Mumbai (1971), Gaan Maharishi title of the Jagatguru Shankaracharya Sankeshwar Peet (1975), Bhuwalka Award of Sangeet Saurabh (1982) and Sangeet Bhishmacharya title of the All World Marathi Sammelan, Mumbai (1989).

His disciples include his sons, Chandrakant Pandit and veteran Gwalior gharana vocalist, Pt. Laxmanrao Pandit, Pt. Sharatchandra Arolkar and granddaughter, noted torchbearer of the Gwalior parampara, Dr. Meeta Pandit.

Krishnarao Pandit, who was associated with All India Radio and Doordarshan as a producer, died on 22 August 1989, at the age of 96. His life has been documented in a biography, Krishnarao Shankar Pandit, a Doyen of Khayal, brought out by Neela Bhagwat. Another book, written by M. Chary also details the life of Pandit. Recently, his granddaughter Meeta Pandit published a book, titled "India's Heritage of Gharana Music: The Pandits of Gwalior" in 2018, based on the life of the Pandit lineage and their invaluable contribution to the Indian classical music scene in all.

== Award ==
2026: Lokmat Sur Jyotsna National Music Award was honoured Legend Award for contribution to Hindustani classical music

== See also ==
- Tansen Samaroh
