= Balasaheb Poonchwale =

- Born: 1918; Gwalior, India
- Origin: Gwalior, Madhya Pradesh, India
- Died: 4 January 2005 (aged 86)
- Genres: Hindustani classical music, Khayal, Tappa, Bhajan
- Occupation: Indian Classical Vocalist
- Years active: 1940-2005

Balasaheb Poonchwale (1918–2005) was a Hindustani classical vocalist and leading figure of the Gwalior gharana. The son and disciple of Raja Bhaiya Poonchwale, he also learned from celebrated musicologists Vishnu Narayan Bhatkhande and S. N. Ratanjankar. Regarded for his role as a music educator, Poonchwale's disciples include Raja Kale, Biswajeet Roy Chowdhury, Prof. Dr. P.L. Gohadkar, Prof. Dr. Jayant Khot, Prof. Dr. Ranjana Tonpay and Shashwati Mandal.
