= Neela Bhagwat =

Indian classical singer (1942-2026)

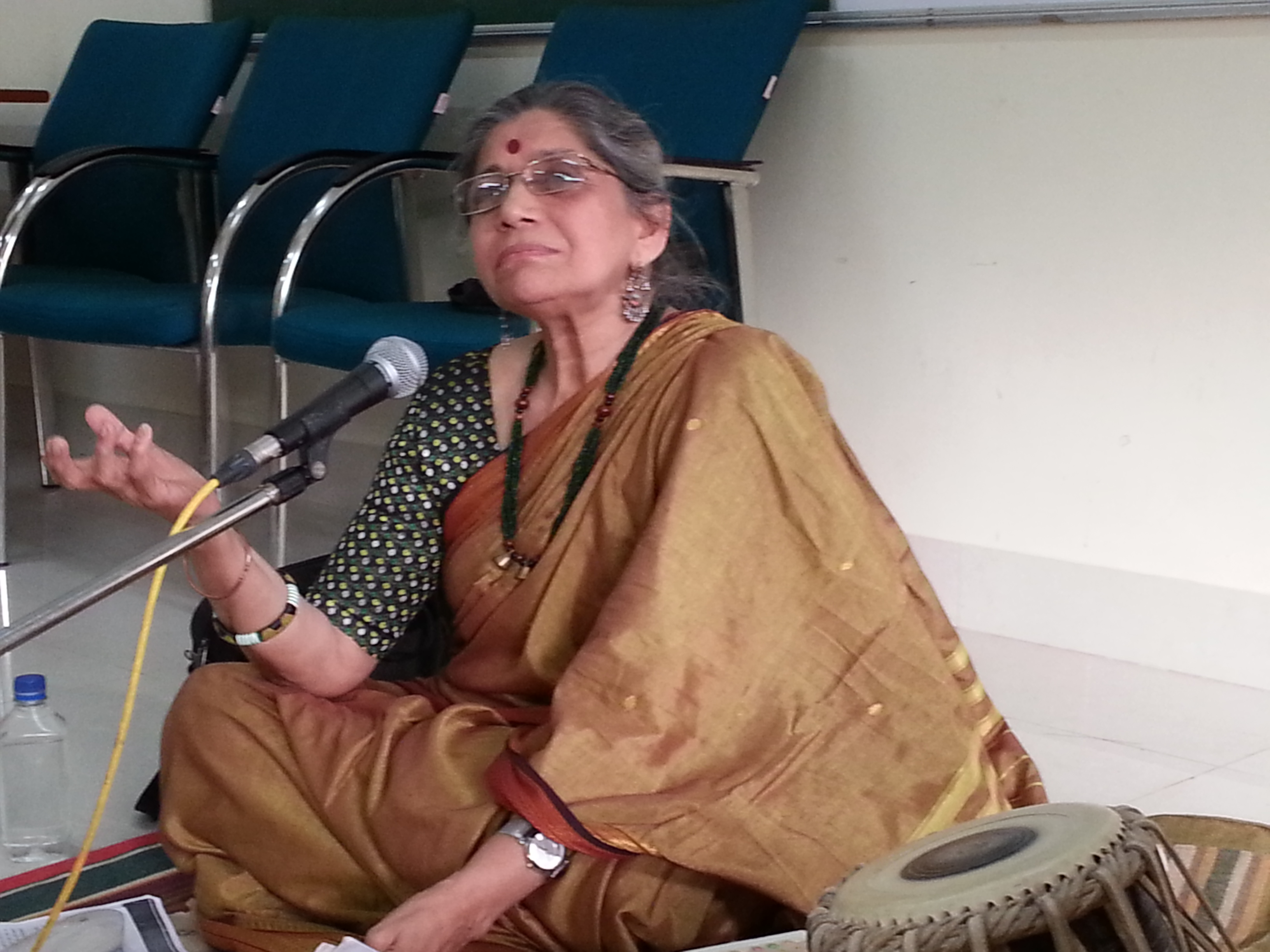

Background information
- Born: 29 November 1942; Pune, Maharashtra, India
- Origin: Pune
- Died: 14 April 2026 (aged 83)
- Genres: Hindustani classical music
- Occupations: Singer, professor, translator

Neela Bhagwat (29 November 1942 – 14 April 2026) was a classical singer, composer and teacher. As a classical musician, she belonged to the Gwalior gharana as represented by Pandit Sharatchandra Arolkar who studied with Krishnarao Shankar Pandit. Bhagwat's other teacher was Jal Balaporia. Over the years she developed a significant reputation as a feminist practitioner, where she expanded her repertoire to create several original khayal compositions. She also sang the work of saint poets Kabir and Meera and Marathi Saint poets, alongside contemporary experimental collaborations with other musicians in India and internationally.

== Early life and education ==
Bhagwat grew up in Mumbai. She recalls her college years growing up in Thana, attending concerts like Kal ke Kalakaar and Haridas Sangeet Sammelan at the Cowasjee Jehangir Hall and Rang Bhavan, and encountering legends like Pandit Omkarnath Thakur and Pandit Birju Maharaj. She did her MA in Sociology, also studying Marathi and Sanskrit, while doing theatre with Satyadev Dubey and learning dance with Lachhu Maharaj. She initially learnt music in the Jaipur gharana under Pandit Ganpatrao Tilak, but became restless, she says: 'life... was vast', and there was the 'Left movement waiting for me to do something'. This was the time of great student ferment, when the socialist Yuvak Kranti Dal, popularly known as Yukrand, had been launched by students in Pune. There was also the Dalit Panthers who had revolutionalised Marathi poetry, and the women's movement, all of which would frame her work.

== Classical music ==
For all her activism, Bhagwat saw herself primarily as a classical singer, and in this as a proud keeper of the Gwalior gharana, becoming for several decades its leading exponent. She was a student of Sharatchandra Arolkar, himself a disciple of Krishnarao Shankar Pandit. In an essay titled 'The Khayal: What It is and What It is not' in the Journal of Arts & Ideas, she explains the form as Gwalior practices it: a 'dialectical interaction between form, content and technique (where) the bandish implies the unfolding of a process, of improvisation of the song-form, of creation and re-creation of the composed form'. She also marked in that essay the lineage of the gharana all the way back to Sadarang and Adarang, two been players in the 18th century court of Mohammad Shah, the brothers Haddu, Hassu and Nathu Khan, sons of Natthan Peerbaksh and teachers of Nissar Husain Khan, to the Pandit family and then to Arolkar. Although her primary desire remained that of a practitioner, she says she had been assigned by Arolkar with the responsibility of 'preserving the knowledge': 'You have to become like a Guru, you have to analyse, become the source of Gwalior, the Khayal and the aesthetics', she says in one interview. She wrote several books on the Khayal, more specifically on the Gwalior gayaki: the biography Krishnarao Shankar Pandit: A Doyen of Khayal (1992), Sharatchandra Arolkar: Lene Pratibheche (later published in Hindi as Khyāla-gāyana kī antaragāthā: Mere Guru Sharatchandra Arolkar) and more recently Gāyanāce Raṅgī (2023)

Bhagwat began singing professionally from 1979. For the next three decades she gave numerous concerts across India and internationally and became well known as the leading exponent of the Gwalior gayaki. Both in the performances and the several lectures, and in writing across this time, she interpreted the legacies of tradition in unusual ways. As she writes in one essay, if 'the original khayal is the most evolved, it (also) has the potential to absorb a new word, connoting a new idea, thus to communicate the cultural ethos of any period in history, to transcend the boundaries and limitations of the period in which it is born'. What the form demonstrated to her '(was) the potential for being treated on a par with forms like drama, the novel or cinema'. She became increasingly critical of the conservatism of the traditional forms, their tendency towards secrecy and their gender bias. Unable to receive the full range of knowledge from Arolkar, she studied with Pandit Jal Balaporia mainly to access traditional compositions she could not learn from Arolkar.

Opening dedication in Bhagwat's Notebook 1 of the foiur-volume Treasure of Gwalior Gharana donated to Wikimedia Commons

In 2015, breaking from what she saw as the secretiveness of Hindustani music, Bhagwat donated four volumes of compositions that she had learnt to Wikimedia Commons under the title Treasure of Gwalior Gharana. Appreciating this remarkable gesture, the singer Shubha Mudgal described this as an 'exemplary act of generosity, in the very spirit of vidya daan, or sharing of knowledge, that forms an intrinsic part of the guru-shishya tradition'.

== Experimental Performances ==
Bhagwat is remembered as much for her work within the pure khayal form as for her several experiments, her musical collaborations, and her original compositions. Among these were Samantar, a cross-disciplinary collaboration with the Carnatic singer Aruna Sairam, singing the works of the saint poets Kabir, Meera, Chokhamela and Sahjo Bai. A special area of focus was the women saint poets, whom she translated together with Jerry Pinto as The Ant Who Swallowed the Sun: The Abhangs of the Marathi Women Saints. Then there have been her several piano collaborations, with British pianist Camilla Cancantata ('Getting the Feel' and 'The Inner Voice', part of the album titled Meeting Point ), her extensive work with the pianist Marion von Tilzer, especially 'Meditate Yourself', 'Soul to Soul' and 'Sound to Purity' in the album Moments in Togetherness, and with Aldo Brizzi ('Endless Trails', 2003-2004).

She composed and sang for several major films, notably Kumar Shahani's film Khayal Gatha (1989) and Anand Patwardhan's Raam ke Naam (1992) She taught music at the SNDT University and Bombay University. Since the early 2000s her focus was mainly on teaching students, and on presenting the work of musicians young and established as part of the Khayal Trust, an organization she ran with her partner, the singer and author Amarendra Dhaneshwar.
