= Kali Mirza =

Indian composer

Kalidas Chattopadhyay (Bengali: কালিদাস চট্টোপাধ্যায়), better known as Kali Mirza (Bengali: কালী মীর্জা), was an 18th-century composer of tappā music in Bengal. A contemporary of Nidhu Babu, he composed over 400 tappās. He received his training in the cities of Delhi and Lucknow. He was born at Guptipara, Hooghly District in present-day West Bengal. His name, "mirza", comes from the Muslim clothes he often wore.
