= Tusu Festival =

Folk festival in eastern India

Tusu parab
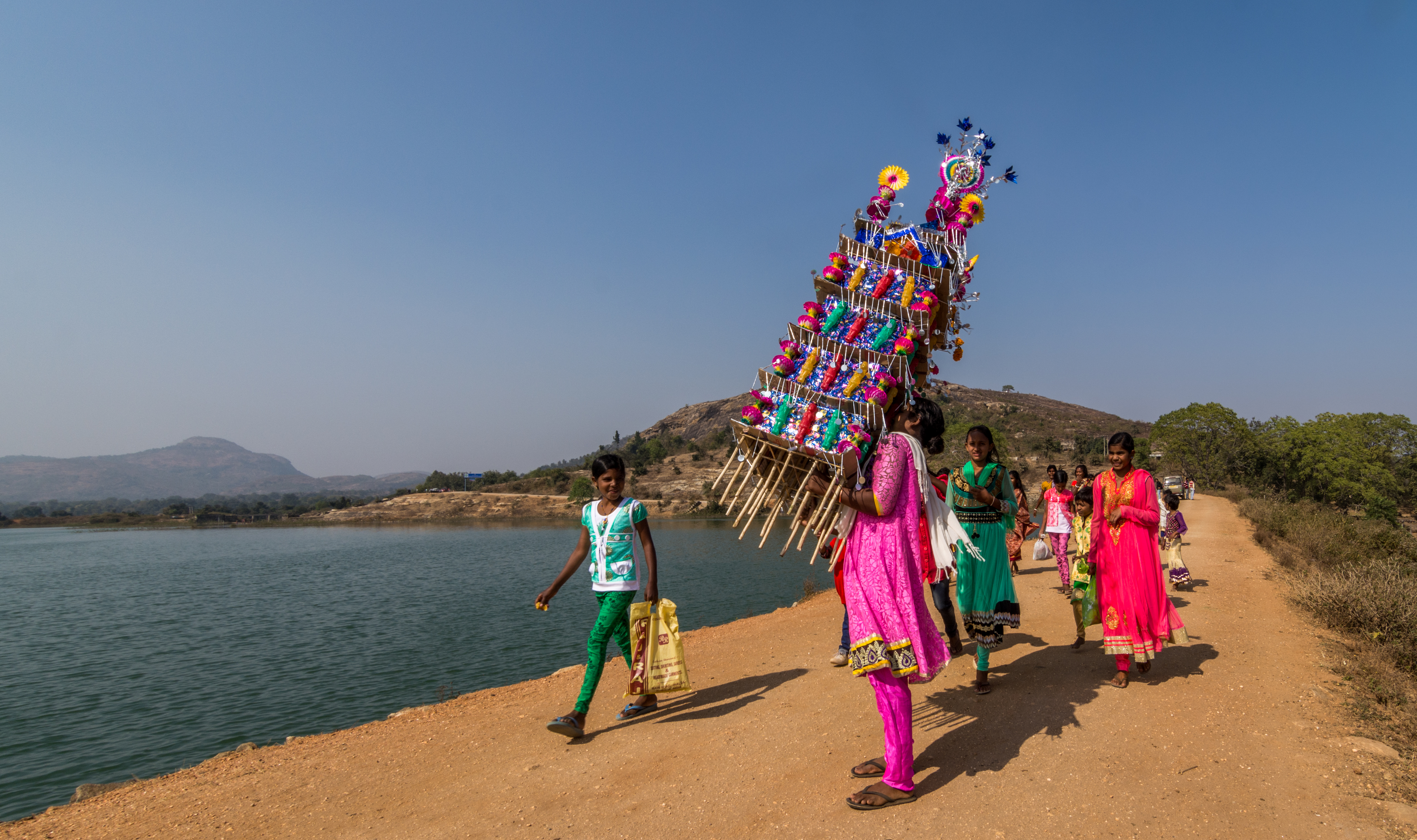
- Observed by: Tribal people of Eastern India
- Type: Cultural
- Significance: worship of Goddess Tusmani
- Celebrations: crops harvesting
- Frequency: Annually
- Related to: Makar Sankranti

Tusu Festival is a folk festival during Makar Sankranti. It is mainly river centric. It is a unifying form of common faith and belief of the agrarian society in joy of harvesting crops. The festival Tusu, is mostly celebrated in Southwest of West Bengal, Southeast of Jharkhand, Northeastern Odisha as well in the Tea-State of Assam.

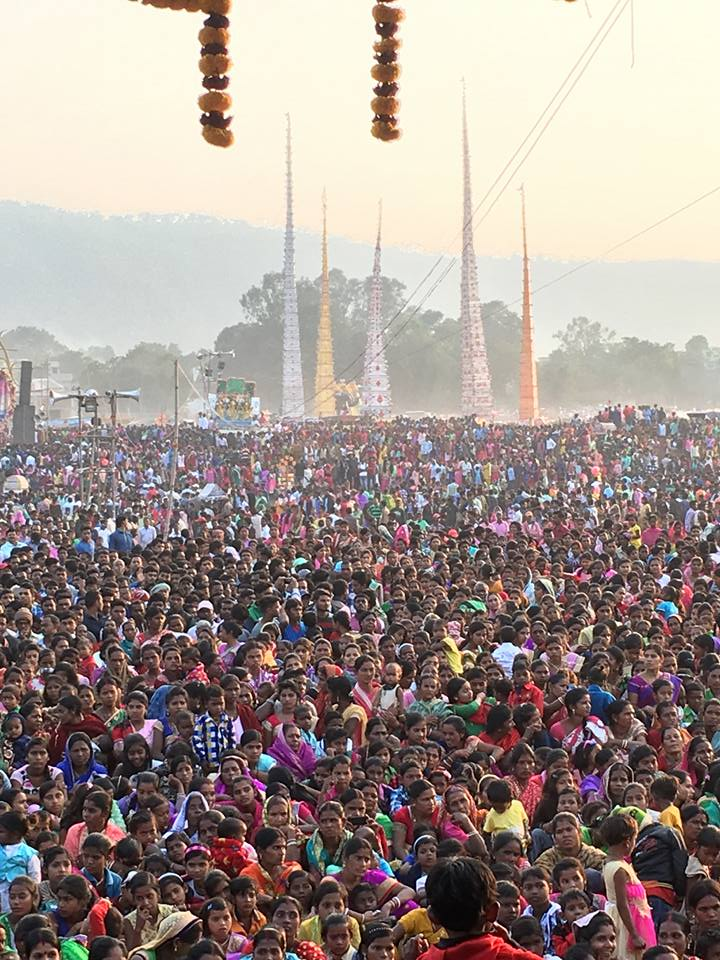
Crowd in Tusu Festival

== See also ==
- Bhadu
