= Mian Ghulam Nabi Shori =

Indian composer (1742–1792)

- Born: 1742; Multan, Subah of Multan, Mughal Empire
- Died: 1792 (aged 49–50)
- Genres: Tappa
- Occupations: Musician, poet

Mian Ghulam Nabi Shori (1742–1792), popularly known as Shori Mian, was an Indian composer of Hindustani classical music. He was a court singer of Asaf-Ud-Dowlah, Nawab of Awadh. He composed tappa, one of the most difficult classical forms, in Punjab. The brisk and ornate tappa form, romantic in nature, tappa's text is always in Punjabi.

It was supposed to be a song of the cameleers of Punjab and Rajasthan.

== Early life ==
He was born in Multan, Punjab, to Ghulam Rasool Khan. The common myth tells that he was initially trained in Khayal singing and had a great command on Taan.

== Tappa ==
He was not satisfied with Khayal for expressing his skill in singing Taan; he restlessly traveled in Punjab, where he listened to the folk songs of camel-riders, which he thought to be suitable for his own style of singing. He composed Tappa using various ornamentations with Taan, Jamjama, Khatka, etc. In the Tappas of Shori Miyan, in Antara we find his name as 'Shori'.
