= Ramprasadi =

Genre of Bengali song composed by Ramprasad Sen

- Native name: রামপ্রসাদী
- Etymology: songs and music composed by Ramprasad Sen
- Stylistic origins: Bengali folk song, Shyama Sangeet, Kirtan

Regional scenes
- India, West Bengal, Tripura, and Bangladesh

Ramprasadi (Bengali: রামপ্রসাদী) are the songs composed by eighteenth century Bengali saint-poet Ramprasad Sen. They are usually addressed to Hindu goddess Kali and written in Bengali language.

== Influence ==
Ramprasad Sen was the first shakta poet to address Kali with such as intimate devotion and to sing of her as a tender loving mother or even as a little girl. He is credited with creating a new compositional form that combined the Bengali folk style of Baul music with classical melodies and kirtan. After him, a school of shakta poets continued the Kali-bhakti tradition. Krishna Chandra Roy, Siraj ud-Daulah, Rabindranath Tagore, Kazi Nazrul Islam were immensely inspired by the songs of Ramprasad. Many of his songs were sung by famous Shyama sangeet singers like Dhananjay Bhattacharya, Pannalal Bhattacharya and Anup Ghoshal.

== Incomplete list of songs ==
- De maa amay tabildari
- Abhay pade pran sanpechi
- Mon re krishi kaaj jana na
- Mon keno mayer charanchara
- Dakre mon kali bole
- Aamar antore anandamayee
- Abhay charan sab lotale
- Apar sangsar nahi parapar
- Annapurnar dhanya kashi
- Asakale jaba kotha
- Aamar kapal go tara
- Ami eto doshi kishe
- Emon din ki hobe maa tara
- Patitapabani tara
- Maa aamar baro bhay hoyeche
- Naam bhrama bateshwar
- kemon kare charaye jaba
- Rasane, kali nam ratare
- Maa aamar khelan halo
- Akalanka shashimukhi, sudhapane sada sukhi
- Aami tei tarutale base
- Aaj subhanishi pohailo tomar
- Amay ki dhon dibi tor ki dhon ache
- Amay choyo naa re shamon aamar jat giyache
- Aamar sanad dheke jare
- Ami oi khede khed kori
- Ar kaaj ki aamar kashi?
- Chi mon tui bisoybhola
- Ar bholale bhulba naa go
- Kemon kare tarabe tara
- Kaligun geye bagal bajaye
- Ke hare hridmajhe bihare
- Mukta karo ma muktakeshi
- Chi-chi monbhramara dili
- Sura paan karine aami
- Tilek dhara ore saman
- Janani Pada Pankajam

== See also ==
- Music of Bengal
- Music of West Bengal
