= Shashwati Mandal =

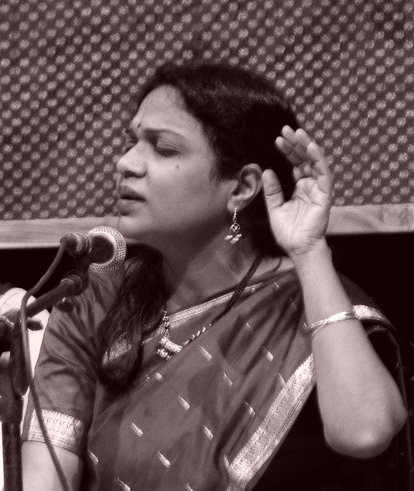
- Shashwati Mandal's performance at Vishnu Digambar Jayanti in Delhi, 2010.

Background information
- Also known as: Shashwati Mandal
- Born: Shashwati Mandal; 1971 (age 54–55); Gwalior, Madhya Pradesh, India
- Origin: Gwalior, Madhya Pradesh, India
- Genres: Hindustani classical music, Khayal, Tappa, Bhajan
- Occupation: Indian Classical Vocalist
- Years active: 1979–present

Shashwati Mandal (b. 1971) is a Hindustani classical music vocalist. She is an exponent of the Gwalior gharana.

== Early life and training ==
Shashwati was born in Gwalior in a family of musicians. Her maternal grandfather Pt. Balabhau Umdekar 'Kundalguru' was a darbar-gayak (court musician) at the royal court of Gwalior, and a singer of the Gwalior gharana. Shashwati started her early classical training under the guidance of her mother, Smt. Kamal Mandal, at a very young age. From 1987-1992, she received a Department of Culture (Govt of India) scholarship to study under the veteran Gwalior gharana singer Pt. Balasaheb Poonchhwale. Balasaheb instilled into her the finer nuances of Gwalior gayaki, and also trained her into the art of Tappa singing, the vibrant semi-classical genre. She continued her training with her gurus, Balasaheb Poonchhwale and Kamal Mandal until their deaths in 2005 and 2006, respectively.

She also studied briefly under Purnima Chaudhuri for Thumri, Gundecha Brothers for Dhrupad, and Sarbat Hussain for Ghazal singing. In 2009-2010, she received Sanskriti Foundation's Mani Mann Fellowship to study under Madhup Mudgal of Gandharva Mahavidyalaya, New Delhi. In addition, she is heavily influenced by the gayaki of Kumar Gandharva, and the repertoire of Jaipur-Atrauli Gharana.

Shashwati has integrated these eclectic musical leanings into her gayaki (musical style). She has received praise for her full-throated resonant voice, and clarity of taans and murkis. She is widely regarded as one of the foremost exponents of Tappa singing.

She currently resides in New Delhi.

== Career ==
As a child prodigy Shashwati started giving public performance at the young age of seven. She has performed extensively in India and abroad. Some of her major performances include Sawai Gandharva Bhimsen Mahotsav in Pune, Maharashtra in 2006 and 2022, Darbar Festival in United Kingdom in 2008, Saptak Annual Festival of Music in Ahmedabad, Gujarat in 2010, Vishnu Digambar Jayanti Samaroh in New Delhi in 2010 and 2018, Harballabh Sangeet Sammelan in Jalandhar, Punjab in 2012 and 2019, ITC Sangeet Sammelan in Kolkata, West Bengal in 2014, Hridayesh Art Festival in Mumbai, Maharashtra in 2019, Raga Music Circle in New York City in 2025, and Tansen Samaroh in Gwalior (several years, most recently in 2021).

Shashwati is a 'top' grade artist at All India Radio and is an empanelled artist at Indian Council for Cultural Relations. She has received several awards through her career, including the prestigious Shikhar Samman 2023 conferred by the Government of Madhya Pradesh to writers, musicians and theatre personalities. She has also received the Mani Mann Fellowship by Sanskriti Foundation, the senior fellowship of Centre for Cultural Resources and Training for her research on women composers in Hindustani music, and the Durga Samman by Veena Venu Art Foundation.

Shashwati also served as a staff artist in All India Radio, Bhopal and an Assistant Professor of Music in Mumbai University, Mumbai.

== Discography ==
- Shashwati Mandal, Alurkar Music House (2006) - Raag Dev Gandhar, Todi, Kalingada Tappa, Bhairavi Tappa
- Sasha: A Tappa Journey, Sense World Music (2007). Nominated to top ten of Songlines Music Awards 2009.
- Pratah Swar, Pancham Nishad (2014) - Raag Lalit, Bhatiyar
- Studio Series I, RagaNXT (2016) - Raag Malgunji, Sohni Bhatiyar, Yaman, Brindabani Sarang Tappa
