= Meeta Pandit =

Dr. Meeta Pandit
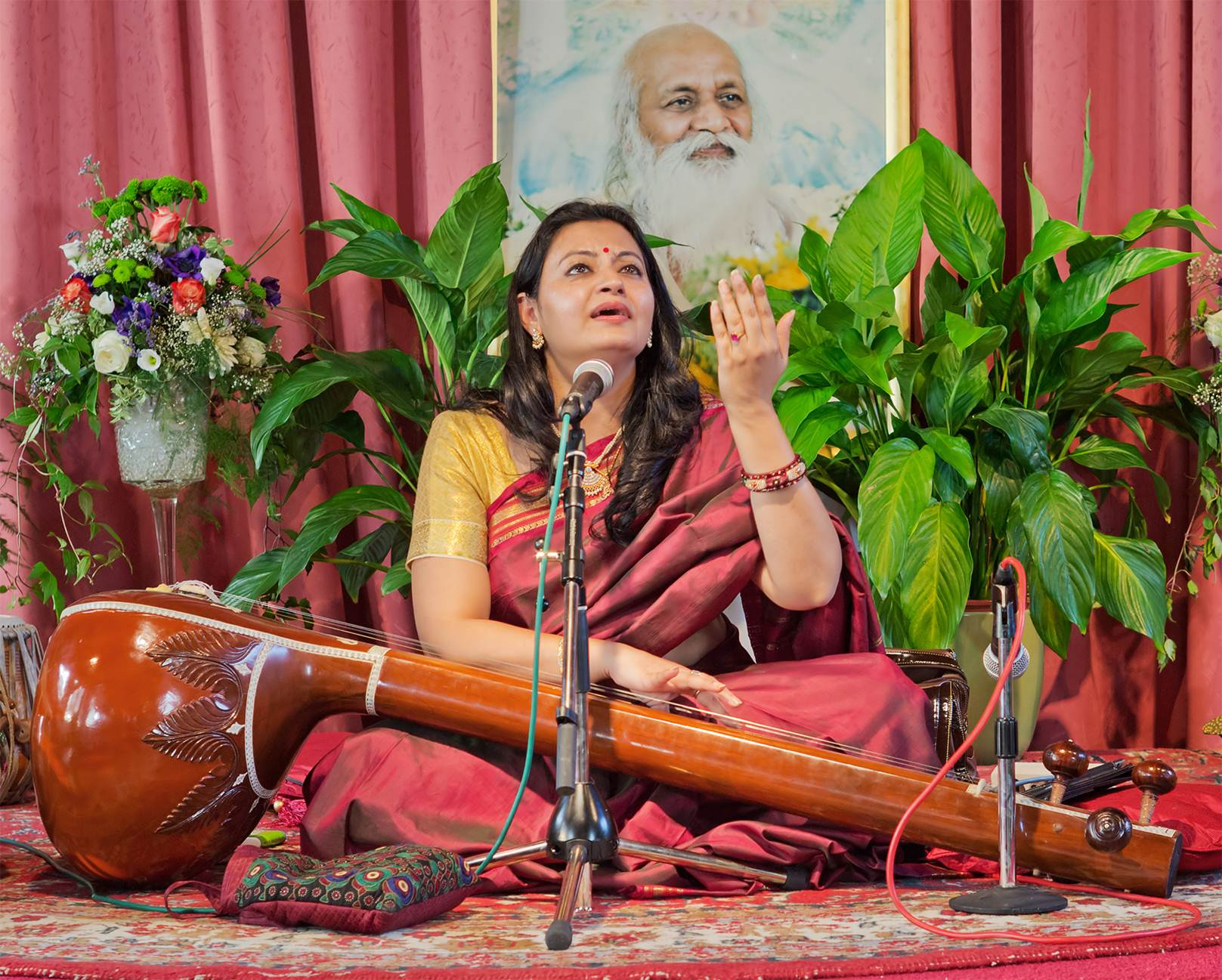
- Pandit at MERU Concert, Netherlands

Background information
- Born: New Delhi, India
- Origin: India
- Genres: Indian classical, Hindustani classical music
- Occupation: Vocalist
- Instrument: Vocals
- Years active: 1983–present
- Labels: EMI, Saregama, Underscore
- Website: www.meetapandit.in

Dr. Meeta Pandit is a Hindustani Classical vocalist and a leading exponent of the Gwalior Gharana. She is the granddaughter and disciple of Krishnarao Shankar Pandit and daughter of Laxman Krishnarao Pandit. She is the sixth in the unbroken lineage and the first woman in the family to have taken up music as a profession.

== Early life ==
Meeta is the daughter of Abha Pandit, a homemaker and Pt. Laxman Krishnarao Pandit, a veteran singer of the Gwalior gharana and Sangeet Natak Akademi awardee. She spent her childhood in New Delhi, where she attended St. Mary's School until higher secondary, and earned a bachelor's degree in commerce from Lady Sri Ram College, Delhi University.

Meeta began training with her legendary grandfather, the doyen of the Gwalior gharana, Padma Bhushan Pt. Krishnarao Shankar Pandit and her father Pt. Laxman Krishnarao Pandit, at the age of 3. Growing up in a house where music ustads and her father's disciples visited day in and day out, and all conversations centered around music, she was exposed to the finer aspects of music from a very young age. However, as a teenager, she was encouraged by her parents to take up a more stable profession than music, primarily due to the irregular working hours and solo travels involved, making it a difficult career choice for a woman. Her elder brother Tushar Pandit was in fact, being groomed to take the family legacy forward. He was pursuing a PhD in Hindustani classical music when he met with a fatal road accident in New Delhi on 1 September 1994 at the age of 27. Meeta, who was pursuing her bachelor's degree in commerce at the time and preparing for an MBA, decided to take up the cudgels of carrying on the legacy and went on to pursue her master's degree in music. She completed her PhD in Hindustani Classical music by the age of 27.

== Career ==
Meeta gave her first performance on stage at the age of 9, during a 3-day music festival ‘Prasang’ organized for the 75th birthday celebrations of her grandfather, Pt. Krishnarao Shankar Pandit at Bharat Bhawan, Bhopal. At the age of 15, she performed at the Sankat Mochan festival in Varanasi, one of India's biggest annual classical music and dance festival. She has performed at almost all the major classical music festivals of India and abroad which include the Sawai Gandharva Bhimsen Festival in 1999 and 2014, the Dover Lane Music Conference, Kolkata in 2013 and 2019 and the Tansen Samaroh, Gwalior in 2011, 2013 and 2019 .

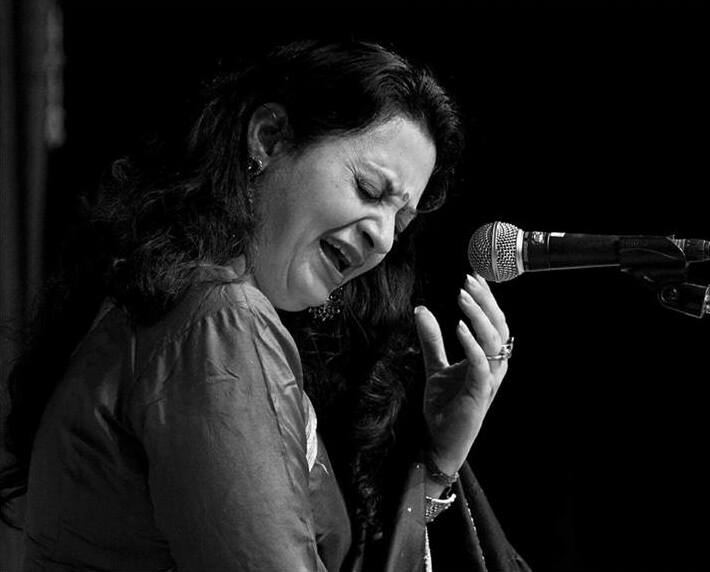
Meeta Pandit Live in Thane – Photograph Credits: Dhanesh Patil 2017

Other notable performances:

- De Meervaart, Netherlands
- 'Spring in the Season of Love' : Bagri Foundation, London (2015)
- WOMADelaide, New Zealand and Australia
- Tasmanian International Arts Festival, Australia
- International Mugham Festival, Baku, Azerbaijan
- India International Centre, New Delhi(2011 & 2014)
- Swaranjali, USA
- 'Strauss Reflected' with David Murphy, John Suchet and Sinfonia Verdi at Cadogan Hall, London (2017)
- Theatre Royal, Hobart, Australia
- Melbourne Recital Centre (2015)
- Darbar Festival, Milton Court Concert Hall, London (2018), United Kingdom
- MERU Concert, Netherlands (2012, 2015)
- Ram Marathe Smruti Sangeet Samaroh, Thane (2017)
- Sankat Mochan Sangeet Samaroh, Varanasi
- Pt. Jitendra Abhisheki Music Festival, Kala Academy, Goa (2017)
- Pancham Group, Satara
- Pracheen Kala Kendra, Chandigarh (2016)
- Ustad Alladiya Khan Sangeet Samaroh, Chembur, Mumbai (2015)
- ViViDa Sangeet Sammelan, Pune (2013)
- National Centre for the Performing Arts, Mumbai
- Swarzankar, Pune
- Pt. Sharatchandra Arolkar Smruti Sangeet Samaroh – Khayal Trust, Mumbai
- Harballabh Sangeet Sammelan, Jalandhar, Punjab (1998, 2001, 2015, 2023)
- Satguru Jagjit Singh Sangeet Sammelan, Sri Bhaini Sahib, Punjab (2017)
- C.R. Vyas Sangeet Samaroh, Vadodara (2015)
- Saptak Music Festival, Ahmedabad
- Ustad Shaik Dawood Tabla Trust, Hyderabad
- Soorya Festival, Trivandrum, Kerala
- Nadaneerajanam, Tirumala Tirupati Devasthanam, Tirupati
- Krishna Gaan Sabha, Chennai
- Delhi Classical Music Festival (2013)
- Thumri Festival, New Delhi (2017)
- West Bengal State Music Academy Music Festival, Kolkata (2017)
- Chowdhury House Music Conference, Kolkata (2019)
- Jnana Pravaha Music Festival, Sangeet Ashram, Kolkata (2011)
- Bharat Sanskriti Yatra, India Habitat Centre, New Delhi
- Madhya Pradesh Diwas, Government of Madhya Pradesh, Bhopal
- 'Aadya', Bharat Bhavan, Bhopal (2017)
- 'Swara- Music for Life', organized by Banyan Tree Events, Jaipur (2015)
- Zee Jaipur Literature Festival, Jaipur (2018)
- SaMaPa Sangeet Sammelan, New Delhi and Jammu (2015)
- 'Sapthak', Bangalore
- Akashwani Sangeet Sammelan, Mumbai (2019)
- Shimla Classical Music Festival, Shimla, Himachal Pradesh
- INK Conference, Jaisalmer, Rajasthan (2019)
- Patna Literature Festival, Patna, Bihar (2019)
- Pt. Sharatchandra Arolkar Smruti Sangeet Samaroh, Khayal Trust, Mumbai (2018)
- Gala Concert, Shanghai Cooperation Organisation Summit (SCO), Bishkek, Kyrgyzstan (2019)

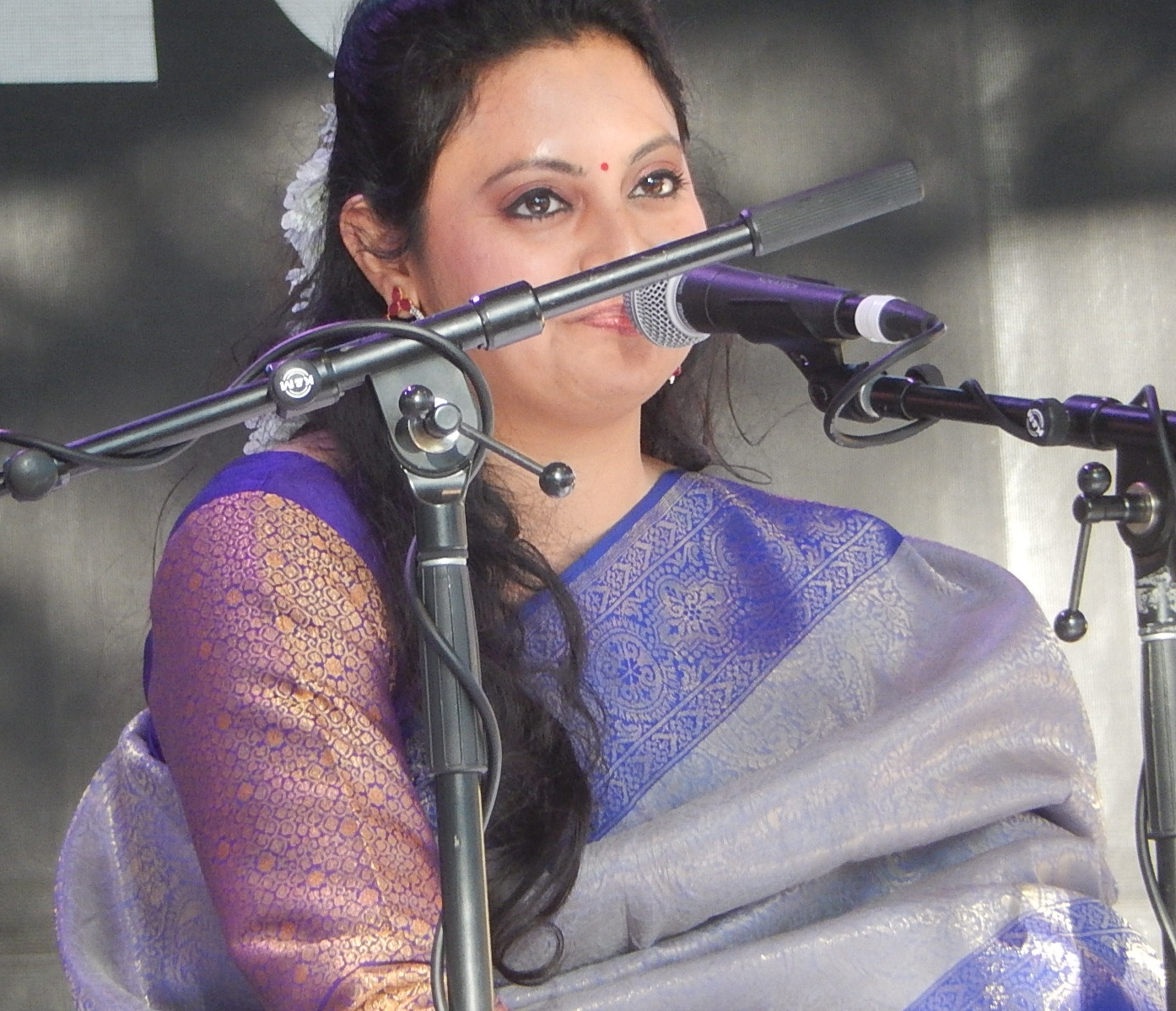
At the WOMADelaide Festival, New Zealand.

=== 1995–2000 ===
Between 1995 and 2005, Meeta performed in festivals in India and abroad in France, Germany, London, Switzerland, Norway, Rome, United States, Russia and Bangladesh.

Through a special project by French Embassy in New Delhi, she stayed in Paris for three months as an "Artist in Residence" in 2003. She collaborated with the Jazz pianist, Allie Delfau, as a part of an Indo-French project.

She represented India as the Cultural Ambassador of India to Pakistan during the South Asian Association For Regional Co-Operation (SAARC) Summit in Islamabad in 2004.

In 2005, the Public Service Broadcasting Trust and Prasar Bharati made a film titled – "Meeta: Linking a Tradition with Today” – which documents her life and growth as a singer.

=== 2005–2019 ===
In 2008, Meeta presented a music appreciation series called "Swar Shringar" on World Space Satellite Radio.

She collaborated with Amsterdam based Tabla player, Heiko Dijker on an album called "The Luminance Project". This album was launched in 2012.

From 2009, she worked as a consultant with Indira Gandhi National Centre for the Arts, New Delhi, a premier government-funded arts organization in India for the documentation of the series 'Masters of Hindustani Classical Music', involved in a project archiving more than 60 living maestros representing different genres and gharanas of Hindustani Classical music.

Along with being a popular performing artist, Pandit is the author of a book titled, 'India's Heritage of Gharana Music: Pandits of Gwalior'. She presently works as the Head of Department, Assistant Professor of music at the Maya Somaiya School of Music and Performing Arts, Somaiya Vidyavihar University, Mumbai. She is a 'top-grade' vocalist of the All India Radio.

For the dissemination of Indian Classical Music, the Prasar Bharati and Doordarshan invited her to present a 13-episodes music education series, 'Raga Sudha', which was telecasted on DD Bharati.

Meeta sings in different genres such as bhajan, thumri, tappa and ghazal and has proved her mastery over khayal and tappa. She actively promotes Indian Classical music worldwide. She has also been actively coaching budding singers from India and abroad in her attempt to spread Indian Classical Music globally. She often performs for SPIC MACAY in various schools and colleges to ignite an interest of Indian Classical Music in students.

== Awards ==
=== Before 2005 ===
- The 'Golden Voice of India' by the Singers Society of India – 1989
- 'Sur Mani' by Sur Singar Samsad – 1992
- 'Excellence in Music' Award: by Lady Shri Ram College – 1995
- 'Full Circle Inner Flame Award', Full Circle Publishing Pvt. Ltd, 1999 (Awarded by I.K Gujral)
- 'Yuva Ratna' – Youth Excellence Award by Rotaract Club – 1999
- 'Sur Mayank' – Pt. Nikhil Banerjee Smriti Award: Sangeet Bhavan (Lucknow) – 2001
- 'Yuva Ojaswini Award' – 2005

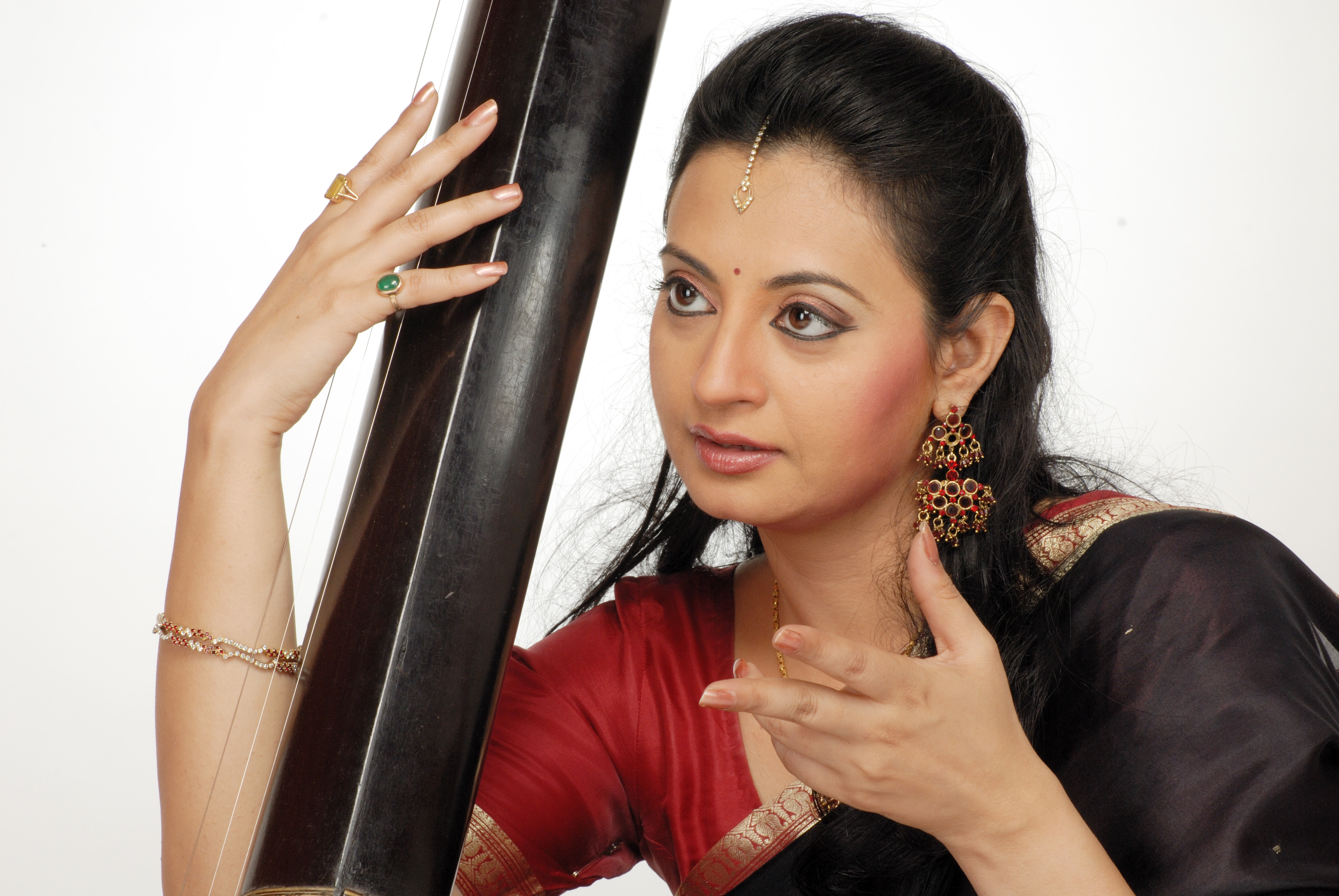

=== 2006–2015 ===
- FICCI Young Achiever Award for Indian classical music for 2007
- Bismillah Khan Yuva Puraskar by Sangeet Natak Academy for 2007
- Delhi Ratna – Art and Cultural Trust of India – 2009
- Art Karat Award for contribution to the field of music – 2013
- SaMaPa Yuva Ratna award from Sopori Academy of Performing Arts, Delhi for contribution to Classical Music – 2015
- Bhav Bhaveshwar Rashtriya Samman, Valsad, Gujarat −2015

=== 2016- Present ===
- JP Award- 2017, instituted by the Loknayak Jaiprakash International Studies Centre, New Delhi
- Kumar Gandharva Rashtriya Samman- 2021, Government of Madhya Pradesh
- 'SargamShree Samman' from Jai Narain Vyas University, Jodhpur, Rajasthan
- 'Kala Srijak Award' from Art of Living, Bengaluru
- 'Devi Award' from The New Indian Express

== Discography ==
- Raga Rang (Saregama)
- Arpan (Underscore Records)
- Young Maestros (Underscore Records and Musictoday)
- The Luminance Project (EMI Virgin)
- Gharana Aur Parampara (Gwalior Gharana) – Vol 1 (Prasar Bharti and Doordarshan)
- Gharana Aur Parampara (Gwalior Gharana) – Vol 2 (Prasar Bharti and Doordarshan)
