= Pseudonym (band) =

Indian alternative rock band

Pseudonym (সেউডনিম)
- Origin: Kolkata, West Bengal, India
- Genres: Alternative rock, 90s rock
- Years active: 2006–2015 (hiatus)
- Label: Independent
- Members: Suyasha Sengupta; Devapriya Sinha; Sompratim Das; Roheet Mukherjee; Rajan Bhaumik
- Past members: Tirthankar Ray; Damayanti Chakravarty; Sudipto (Johnny) Chakraborty; Bhaveen Juthani
- Website: www.pseudonymband.webs.com

Pseudonym [sju:dənim], (Bengali: সেউডনিম) is an alternative rock band, based in Kolkata, West Bengal, India. The band was formed in 2006, with an outright inclination towards progressive and alternative music.

Pseudonym was established when Sompratim, Devapriya, and Rajan, who previously worked together as band members decided to work together.

== Early years ==
During the initial days the three members fought hard to find a bassist and after almost a year they found Tirthankar Ray and proceeded with their music. Since the band did not have any vocalist, they started playing instrumental covers and composed a few originals. Pseudonym featured local vocal talents from friends in their gigs as special acts till they found Damayanti Chakravarty as their vocalist. Tirthankar left the band to carry on with his own music projects and Sudipto (Johnny) Chakraborty joined in as the band's bassist. After a long stint with Pseudonym, Johnny also left the band and Roheet Mukherjee joined as bassist.

== Later years ==
Damayanti left the band to pursue higher studies and after prolonged auditions the members found Suyasha Sengupta to be the perfect fit as the front person of the band. Pseudonym by that time had already established themselves in the live music scene and started performing regularly at Someplace Else, The Park hotel pub which is considered to be the ace pub in Kolkata hosting the biggest local and national names in western music once Suyasha joined the band. Now the band performs live on Wednesdays from 11:30pm onwards at Someplace Else, Kolkata.

== Personnel ==
Current band members

- Suyasha Sengupta (vocals)
- Devapriya Sinha (guitar/vocals)
- Sompratim Das (guitar)
- Roheet Mukherjee (bass)
- Rajan Bhaumik (drums)

Former band members

- Tirthankar Ray
- Damayanti Chakravarty
- Sudipto (Johnny) Chakraborty
- Bhaveen Juthani

== Discography ==
Dreams

EP by Pseudonym
- Released: October 2008
- Recorded: 2008
- Genres: Alternative rock, 90s rock
- Length: 15:05
- Label: Independent
- Producer: Pseudonym

Pseudonym has released one EP, entitled, Dreams, which consists of three singles "Ants in a Queue", "Little Calvin", and "The Journey", which was released in the year 2008. Although the EP was not commercially successful but the singles became popular when they played during their live concerts. The name of the EP, Dreams, was suggested by the lead guitarist of the band Devapriya and other members of the band agreed to it.

Production

- Compilation concept: Devapriya Sinha
- Producer and mixer: Saikat Ghosh and Rajan Bhaumik
- Cover art design: Rajan Bhaumik
- Photography: N. G. Bhaumik

Tracks

- "Ants in a Queue" – (6:20)

The song was written to put a glance on the comparison between human beings and the ants. The artist tries say that how we human beings are disorganized and greedy while even insects (ants) like an army of marching ants are more disciplined, in harmony and how we should learn from them.

- "Little Calvin" – (4:28)

This was the band's favorite track. The song is based on the Bill Watterson comic strip Calvin and Hobbes. The song puts a glance on the character Calvin as he grows up and the beautiful imaginary world transforms into a place of practical filth, making things around not great as it was. It urges everyone to keep ‘the child inside’ living even if one grows up.

- "The Journey" – (4:17)

This song was the band's first non-instrumental composition. The song is an Ode to nature and hovers around Mother Nature and its beauty with the footsteps of a wanderlust who is mesmerized by the wonders around. It also glances about the thrills, joys and even the fears of being drenched in the rain of romanticism and soaked in the sun.

== Singles ==
No.	Title	Writer(s)	Length
1.	"Shadowfight"	Pseudonym	3:16
2.	"Ants in a Queue"	Pseudonym	6:20
3.	"Little Calvin"	Pseudonym	4:28
4.	"The Journey"	Pseudonym	4:17

== See also ==
- Rock music of West Bengal
