= Ramprasad Sen =

Shakta poet of eighteenth century Bengal

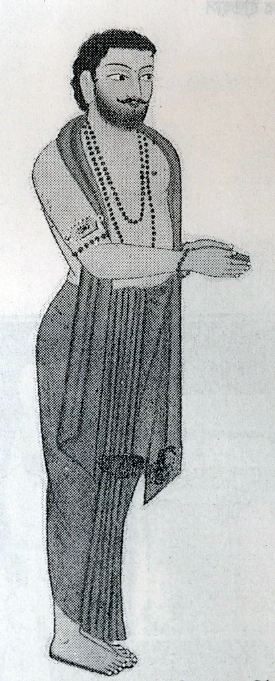
- Born: c. 1723 or c. 1718; Halisahar-Kumarhatta, Bengal Subah, Mughal Empire
- Died: 1781 (aged 62–63); Halisahar, Bengal, British India
- Other name: Sadhak Ramprasad
- Occupations: Saint, Poet
- Known for: Ramprasadi

Rāmprasād Sen (c. 1723/1718 – c. 1775) was a Hindu Shakta poet and saint of 18th-century Bengal. His bhakti poems, known as Ramprasadi, are still popular in Bengal—they are usually addressed to the Hindu goddess Kali and written in Bengali. Stories of Ramprasad's life typically include legends and myths mixed with biographical details.

It is said that, Ramprasad was born into a Bengali Baidya Brahmin family, and showed an inclination towards poetry from an early age. He was highly influenced by Krishnananda Agamavagisha, a Tantric scholar and yogi. Ramprasad became well known for his devotional songs. His life has been the subject of many stories depicting his devotion to, and relationship with, Kali. Ramprasad's literary works include Vidyasundar, Kali-kirtana, Krishna-kirtana and Shaktigiti.

Ramprasad is credited with creating a new compositional form that combined the Bengali folk style of Baul music with classical melodies and kirtan. The new style took root in Bengali culture with many poet-composers combining folk and raga-based melodies, mixing every common style of music from classical to semi-classical and folk. His songs are sung today, with a popular collection—Ramprasadi Sangit ("Songs of Ramprasad")—sold at Shakta temples and pithas in Bengal.

== Biography ==
Biographies of Ramprasad are a mixture of biography, metaphor, and legend.

=== Early life ===
Ramprasad was born in Garalgachha, in Hooghly District (at his maternal house), in a Baidya family, but his paternal ancestral house was in Halisahar-Kumarhatta (today in district North 24 Parganas) belonging to Dhanvantari gotra. Due to the absence of birth records, his actual birth date is not known, but it is believed to be around 1718 or 1723. His father, Ramram Sen, was an Ayurvedic doctor and Sanskrit scholar. Ramprasad's mother Siddheswari was Ramram's second wife. Ramprasad was sent to a Sanskrit tol (school) where he learned Sanskrit grammar, literature, Persian, and Hindi. As a youth, he had a talent for poetry and learning new languages.

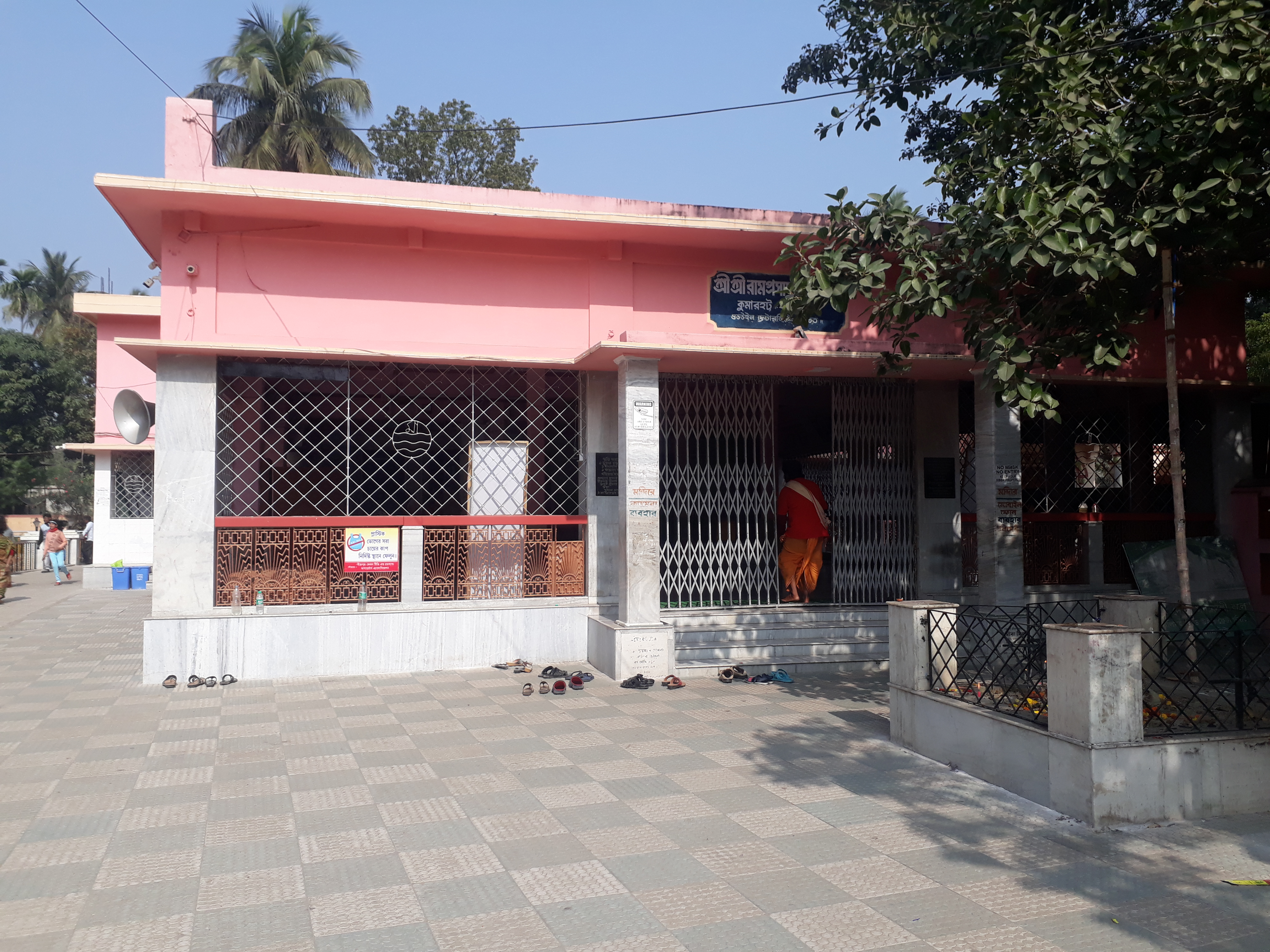
House of Ramprasad Sen at Halisahar

Ramram hoped his son would follow in his profession, but Ramprasad showed no interest in practical pursuits. As he grew up, his spiritual inclinations caused a great deal of anxiety to his parents. Believing that marriage would make Ramprasad more responsible, his parents married him to a girl named Sarvani when he was twenty-two years old. In keeping with the family custom, the newly wed couple was initiated by the family's spiritual teacher, Madhavacharya. According to traditional accounts, during initiation when the guru whispered the mantra to him, Ramprasad became consumed by intense longing for the goddess Kali. One year after the initiation, he lost his guru. Ramprasad later became the disciple of Krishnananda Agamavagisha, a Tantric yogi and scholar. Agamavagisha was a well known devotee of Kali and the author of the Bengali book Tantrasara. Agamavagisha instructed Ramprasad in Tantric sadhanas (spiritual disciplines) and worship of Kali.

=== Employment ===
Instead of following his parents wishes and looking for a job, it is said that Ramprasad devoted most of his time to sadhana. Ramram died before he could make provisions to support the family. Forced finally by poverty, Ramprasad moved to Kolkata and worked as an accountant in the household of Durga Charan Mitra for a monthly salary of thirty rupees. According to traditional accounts, during his employment Ramprasad would write devotional songs to Kali. His fellow employees were appalled to see Ramprasad write poems in his account book, and reported him to their employer. Durga Charan Mitra, upon reading Ramprasad's work, was moved by his piety and literary skill. Instead of dismissing Ramprasad from work, he asked him to return to his village and compose songs to Kali, while continuing to pay his salary.

=== Sadhana and poetry ===
After returning to his village, Ramprasad spent most of his time in sadhana, meditation, and prayer. Traditional accounts tell of several esoteric sadhanas that he performed, including standing neck-deep in the river Ganges, singing songs to Kali. Ramprasad would regularly practice his sadhana in a panchavati: a grove with five trees—banyan, bael, amalaki, ashoka, and peepul—all regarded as holy in Tantric tradition. He would reportedly spend hours meditating on a panchamundi asana (an altar inside which are interred five skulls–that of a snake, frog, rabbit, fox, and man). According to popular stories he had a vision of Kali in her form of Adyashakti Mahamaya.

Raja Krishnachandra of Nadia, heard Ramprasad's hymns. Being an ardent devotee of Kali, he appointed Ramprasad as his court poet. Ramprasad rarely attended the Maharaja's court and would spend his time in sadhana and worship of Kali instead. Krishna Chandra became Ramprasad's benefactor, giving him 100 acres (0.40 km^{2}; 0.16 sq mi) of tax free land. Ramprasad, in return, dedicated his book Vidyasundar ("Beautiful Knowledge") to the Maharaja. Krishna Chandra also gave Ramprasad the title Kaviranjana ("Entertainer of poets"). During the Maharaja's last years, Ramprasad stayed beside him, singing hymns to Kali.

=== Death ===
During Ramprasad's old age, he was looked after by his son Ramdulal and daughter-in-law Bhagavati. A folk story is told of Ramprasad's death. Ramprasad was very fond of taking part in Kali puja on the night of Diwali, the festival of lights. On one Kali puja night, he performed the puja and sang throughout the night. In the morning, Ramprasad carried the jar of Divine Mother's sanctified water on his head to the Ganges. He was followed by the devotees, who carried the clay image of Kali to be immersed in the Ganges after the night of worship. Ramprasad waded into the holy river, until the water was neck deep, all the while singing for Kali. As Kali's image was immersed, Ramprasad died— this was believed to be around 1775.

However, recent documentary evidence, a Kabulatipatra dated April 1794 bearing the sign of Ramprasad Sen as a witness, clearly proves the fact that Ramprasad Sen was alive in 1794. The said Kabulatipatra has been preserved and displayed at Sabarna Sangrahashala in Barisha.

== Stories and legends ==
In Bengal, popular stories and legends are told of Ramprasad. One of the most well known stories is about a "radiant girl" who helped him one day. Ramprasad was repairing a fence with the assistance of his daughter, who left shortly thereafter. Soon a "radiant girl", whom he didn't recognize, came to help him. After finishing the task, she vanished. According to the story, Ramprasad then realized that she was a manifestation of Kali.

Another popular story is told of Ramprasad's vision of goddess Annapurna of Varanasi. Ramprasad was on his way to the river for his daily ritual bath when a beautiful young woman stopped him, asking if she could hear him sing a devotional song to the Divine Mother. Ramprasad requested her to wait, since it was getting late for his noon worship. When he returned, he couldn't find her, and began to think that it may have been the "play of Divine Mother." Sitting down to meditate, he was surrounded by a radiant light and heard a female voice saying, "I am Annapurna (…) I came all the way from Varanasi to hear your songs but, alas, I had to leave disappointed." Ramprasad was angry with himself and immediately left for Varanasi to find Mother Annapurna and sing for her. After walking many miles, he reached Triveni, where he took rest under a tree on the bank of the Ganges. Here he reportedly received another vision, saw the same mystical light, and heard the Mother's voice saying, "Stay here and sing for me. (…) Varanasi is not the only place where I live; I pervade the whole universe."

== Poetry and influence ==
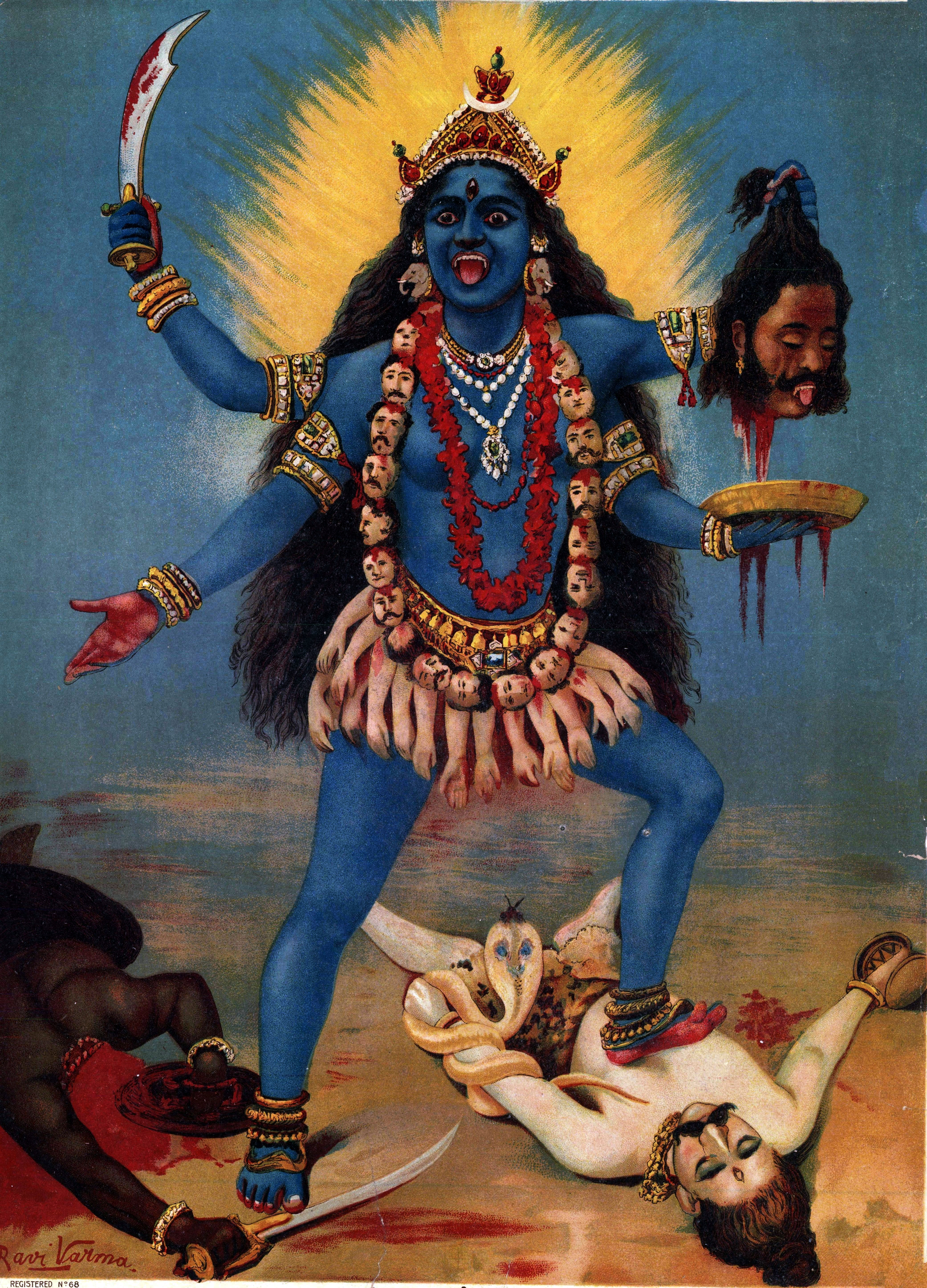
Goddess Kali, the patron goddess of Ramprasad Sen

Ramprasad Sen is regarded as one of the notable figures of the bhakti movement in Bengal during the eighteenth century. He is credited with popularizing the bhakti Shakta tradition and Shyama Sangeet—devotional songs to the goddess Kali. Ramprasad was the first Shakta poet to address Kali with such intimate devotion, and to sing of her as a tender loving mother or even as a little girl. After him, a school of Shakta poets continued the Kali-bhakti tradition.

Ramprasad created a new compositional form that combined the Bengali folk style of Baul music with classical melodies and kirtan. This new form took root in Bengali culture for the next hundred and fifty years, with hundreds of poet-composers combining folk and raga-based melodies, and bringing together styles of music that included classical, semi-classical, and folk. His poetic style has been described as "sweet, familiar and unsophisticated", though his lyrics were sung in classical style rather than a folk style. Two of his notable successors as composers in the same style were Kamalakanta Bhattacarya and Mahendranath Bhattacarya.

Ramprasad's songs are known as Ramprasadi. The devotion to Kali often included as a background the events in Bengal during his time, such as the Bengal famine of 1770, economic hardships, and the deterioration of rural culture. His poems were very popular during his lifetime.

Ramprasad's literary works include Vidyasundar (or Kalikaman-gala) (ca. sixth or seventh decade of the 18th century), Kali-kirtana, the fragmentary Krishna-kirtana, and Shaktigiti. Kali-kirtana is a collection of lyric and narrative poetry describing the early life of Uma. Krishna-kirtana is an incomplete book of poems and songs to Krishna—the complete collection is yet to be discovered. Vidyasundara Kavya is written in a narrative style that was already popular in Bengali literature, telling the traditional love story of Vidya and Sundara—children of kings who are aided by Kali in meeting, falling in love, and marrying. Shaktigiti is Ramprasad's well known and respected work, in which he expresses his deepest feelings and love for Kali. In Shaktigiti, he shares the most intimate relationship with Kali—a child who can both love and quarrel with his mother over the inequities of human birth.

Ramakrishna Paramahamsa, a mystic of nineteenth century Bengal, often sang his songs and regarded Ramprasad as his beloved poet. Many of these songs are recorded in The Gospel of Sri Ramakrishna, which at one point mentions, "…he (Ramakrishna) would spend hours singing the devotional songs of great devotees of the Mother, such as Kamalakanta and Ramprasad. Those rhapsodic songs describing direct vision of God…" Paramahansa Yogananda also was an admirer of Ramprasad and his devotional songs, frequently singing them. Sister Nivedita compared Ramprasad with the English poet William Blake.

One of Ramprasad's hymns to the Goddess is as follows:

You'll find Mother In any house.
Do I dare say it in public?
She is Bhairavi with Shiva,
Durga with Her children,
Sita with Lakshmana.
She's mother, daughter, wife, sister—
Every woman close to you.
What more can Ramprasad say?
You work the rest out from these hints.

Another of his popular poems describes the human attempt to understand the Goddess:

You think you understand the Goddess?
Even philosophers can not explain her.
The scriptures say that she, herself,
is the essence of us all. It is she, herself,
who brings life through her sweet will.

You think you understand her?
I can only smile, you think that you can
truly know her? I can only laugh!
But what our minds accept, our hearts do not.
Ants try to grasp the moon, we the goddess.

Ramprasad's songs are still popular in Bengal and recited regularly in the worship of Kali. Scholar Shuma Chakrovarty notes that his songs are "broadcast over the radio and sung on the streets and in the homes and temples of Calcutta by a cross-section of people—children, the elderly, housewives, businessmen, scholars, the illiterate, monks, householders, and the youth of all classes". Many of his songs were sung by popular Shyama Sangeet singers like Dhananjay Bhattacharya, Pannalal Bhattacharya, and Anup Ghoshal. Uttara Devi, Kamla Jharia.

Still his master literature combination of simple words in the songs melts one's hearts and floods the eye with tears. An [anekanta]vadin reading of Ramprasad's texts is also found.
