= Nidhu Babu =

Promoter of Tappa song in Bengal

Ramnidhi Gupta (Bengali: রামনিধি গুপ্ত) (1741– 6 April 1839), commonly known as Nidhu Babu, was one of the reformers of Bengali tappā music.

Nidhu Babu was born in Chapta, Hooghly District at his maternal uncle's house. His ancestral house was at Kumartuli in North Kolkata, where he grew up learning Persian and some English. Little is known about his upbringing, but by 1776 he had become a clerk in the office of the Chhapra Collectorate.

In Chhapra, Nidhu Babu found a Muslim ustad to train him in the techniques of a formal gharana, or school of musical thought. However, he soon became fed up with his method of teaching, and decided to independently translate Hindi music into Bengali.

In 1794, Nidhu Babu left his job in Chhapra and returned to Calcutta with a savings of ten thousand rupees.

In 1805-06, Nidhu Babu organized an akhrai troupe, an akhra being a fraternal society for studying and practicing classical Indian music. It was for his refinement and composition of akhrai songs that he initially became notable. However, his tappā were the songs that brought him lasting fame.

Nidhu Babu's principal work is the Gitaratna, a book of tappā love songs (with one exception, a tappā expressing his love for the Bengali language). Most of the songs in the Gitaratna are chaste and deal with separation or neglect.

As a babu in early modern Bengali society, Nidhu Babu had few worldly needs; he was never ordered to sing a song. According to his contemporary James Long, he composed his best poems under the influence of wine. However, he was also noted for his fiercely independent personality, his hygiene and his love for food and wine.
