= Bhadu (festival) =

Festival in Southern districts of West Bengal

Bhadu is the social festival of Southern West Bengal, East India. The festival starts from the first day of Bhadro, the fifth month in Hindu Calendar and continues till the end of the month.

It has its origins in the story of a princess called Bhadravati (Bhadresvari) of Panchakote who magically disappeared. Bhadravati's devotees make an image of her and sing and dance before it throughout the month. On the last day of Bhadra, they gather on the river bank and immerse the image in the water. Songs, mainly focussing on marriage, form the main attraction of the festival in which both professional groups and amateurs take part. Celebrations include fairs and cultural programmes.

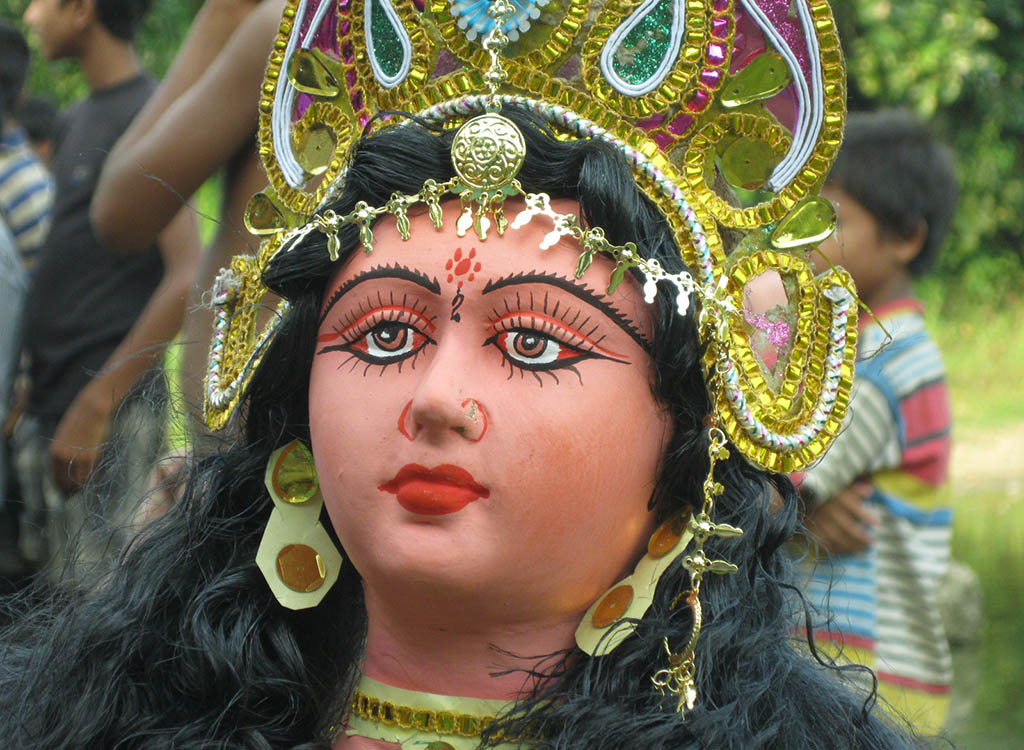
An idol of Goddess Bhadu

== Location ==
Bhadu festival is mostly celebrated in Purulia, Bankura, Birbhum and Bardhaman districts of West Bengal.

== Folklore ==
The Bhadu festival is centered around the legend of the princess Bhadu. According to legend, she was found as an orphan by the chief of Lada village. Bhadu is said to be the living embodiment of the goddess Lakshmi. The chief adopts her and secretly raises her as a princess. Bhadu falls in love with Anjan, the son of a doctor in a neighboring village. The king does not approve of the relationship and has Anjan imprisoned. Bhadu and two companions then travel the kingdom singing song at the gates of forts and prisons, hoping that Anjan will hear her voice. The king eventually releases Anjan, but by then Bhadu has disappeared, and is said to have faded away and merged with the sky.

The songs of the Bhadu festival are based on those that Bhadu was believed to have sung.

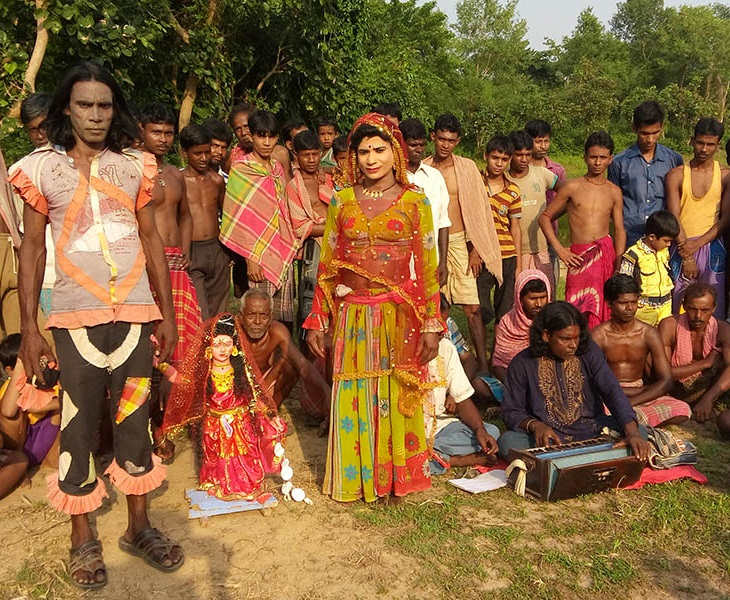
Bhadu songs are being sung in a village

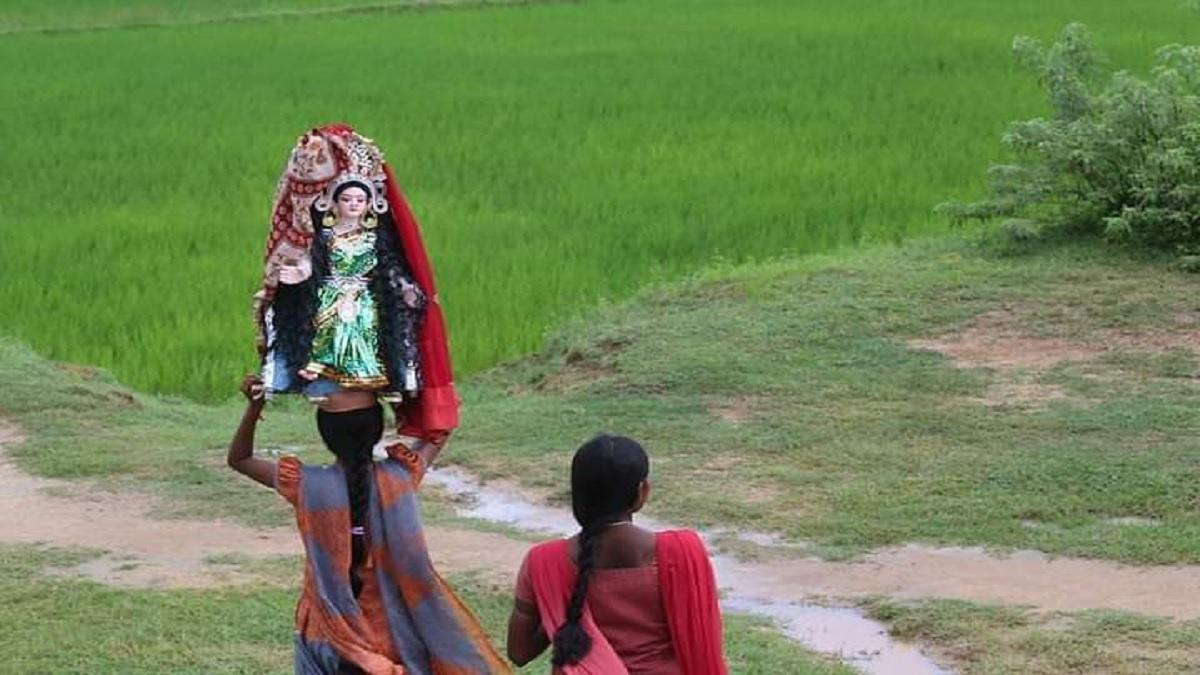
Goddess Bhadu being taken for immersion

== Songs ==
Bhadu gaan, an inseparable part of Bhadu festival reflects the colours of rural society. It used to be very popular in Burdwan, Bankura and Midnapore. But in Birbhum the existence of this unique genre is being threatened by the rising popularity of cinema and television. Bhadu songs are composed extemporaneously and sung on each night of the festival, depicting the Goddesses as young girls. They describe Bhadu and tell in loving detail how they will be entertained. Since Bhadu is unmarried, her songs are sung mostly by unmarried girls. Dancing and playing drums accompanies Bhadu.

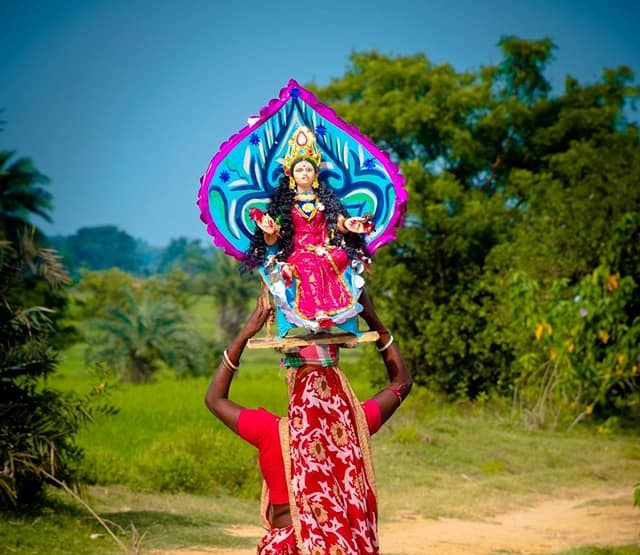
Woman carries an idol of Goddess Bhadu
