= Tappa =

Form of Indian semi-classical vocal music

Tappa is a form of Indian semi-classical vocal music. Its specialty is a rolling pace based on fast, subtle and knotty construction. Its tunes are melodious and sweet, and depict the emotional outbursts of a lover. Tappe (plural) were sung mostly by songstresses, known as baigees, in royal courts.

== History ==
Tappa originated from the folk songs of the camel riders in Punjab. The tappa style of music was refined and introduced to the imperial court of the Mughal Emperor Muhammad Shah, and later by Mian Ghulam Nabi Shori or Shori Mian, a court singer of Asaf-Ud-Dowlah, Nawab of Awadh.

In Bengal, Ramnidhi Gupta, Shibangshu De & Kalidas Chattopadhyay composed Bengali tappa and they are called Nidhu Babu's Tappa. Tappa gayaki took new shape and over decades became puratani, a semi-classical form of Bengali songs.

Tappa, as a significant genre in Bengali musical styles, reached levels of excellence in lyrics and rendition (gayaki), arguably unmatched in other parts of India. Hugely popular in the latter half of the 19th century and the beginning of the 20th, tappa was the genre of choice of the wealthy elite as well as the classes with more modest means. An evolved format of the tappa was the baithaki style, which evolved under the direct patronage of the landed elites of the zamindari classes of the late 19th and early 20th centuries, in their baithak-khanas (literally, baithak - assembly, khana - halls or salons) and jalsaghar (literally, halls for entertainment, mujra or nautch halls)

Composers of repute included Bidyasundar, Roopchaand Pakkhi, Dadathakur, and Hiralal Sarkhel. Unfortunately, tappa being mainly a vocal tradition, a lot of priceless material from the body of art has been lost in the passage of time. Many celebrated artists died before recordings of music became common. What is left today is mainly handed down from the generations by oral traditions as well as some written matter, occasionally turned up in the course of research.

Ramkumar Chattopadhyay was one of the vocal proponent of the tappa style music in Bengal, renowned for his semi-humorous and majorly artistic renditions and his comical incorporation of English into the Bengali lyrics, either his own translations or his anecdotal translations based on prior sources, ostensibly for the 'comprehension' of the British 'sahibs' in the British Raj era, but containing many subversive and sarcastic tones in the English transliterations, clearly against the Imperial regime, but subtly put, so as not to arouse the suspicion of the strict and (usually) sensitive colonial government and invite charges of sedition. (e.g. Let me go, ohe dwari, tumi kader kuler bou (humorously translated by him as "Madam, whose family you belong to...").

== Performers ==
Among the prominent living performers of this style are Pt. Laxmanrao and his daughter Vidushi Meeta Pandit, Pandita Malini Rajurkar and Shashwati Mandal of the Gwalior Gharana, Shanno Khurana of the Rampur-Sahaswan gharana, Smt. Shubhada Paradkar, a disciple of Gajananrao Joshi and Pt. Ajoy Chakrabarty of the Patiala gharana.

Among instrumentalists, sarod player Shekhar Borkar from Pune was the first ever to perform a tappa on an instrument, implementing the Tarankaar Baaz, a style of playing he invented.
