= Prithibi Ta Naki Chhoto Hote Hote =

Song by Krosswindz and Moheener Ghoraguli

from the album Aabaar Bochhor Kuri Pore
- Language: Bengali
- English title: Our world keeps shrinking
- Released: 1995
- Recorded: 1995
- Studio: Presto
- Venue: Kolkata, West Bengal
- Genre: Bengali rock
- Length: 6:04
- Label: Asha Audio
- Songwriter: Gautam Chattopadhyay
- Lyricist: Pallab Roy (additional)

Audio sample
- file; help

"Prithibi Ta Naki Chhoto Hote Hote" (Bengali:পৃথিবীটা নাকি ছোট হতে হতে lit. 'Our world keeps shrinking') is a Bengali rock song by Krosswindz from Moheener Ghoraguli's 1995 album Aabaar Bochhor Kuri Pore. It was composed and written by Gautam Chattopadhyay, and sung by Bonnie Chakraborty. This song among others in the album helped Moheener Ghoraguli in their way to popularity and critical recognition after they disbanded in 1981. It was later covered by various Bengali rock bands and also in a Hindi song called "Bheegi Bheegi".

== Background ==
A decade-and-a-half after Moheener Ghoraguli (MG), the Bengali rock band, disbanded in 1981 was when the lead composer of the band, Gautam Chattopadhyay, decided to create a new album after being fascinated by the MTV music videos that were released in the early 90s. Chattopadhyay's son, Gaurab Chatterjee, in an interview stated, "He (Gautam) got new people to sing some of his post-Moheener songs, shot videos for them and that’s how a collective of great music came about".

The album, Aabaar Bochhor Kuri Pore, would include songs from artists other than MG namely Krosswindz, Lakkhichhara, Garer Maath and individual artists for e.g., Surojit Chatterjee, Antara Chowdhury and Paroma Banerji. One of the songs from the album, Prithibi Ta Naki Chhoto Hote Hote, was a collaborative work between Krosswindz and MG.

== Release and reception ==
The song with the album, Aabaar Bochhor Kuri Pore, was released as a booklet in Kolkata Book Fair in January 1995. Fossils' lead guitarist Allan Ao understood the lyrics much later than the song's release as he found the wordplay in the lyrics to be "fantastic" and that "It has taken on an anthemic quality, both young and old listeners love it." This was the first hit Bengali rock song as stated by Lakkhichhara's drummer Gaboo (or Gaurab Chatterjee), (Note: Not to be confused with Gautam Chattopadhyay's son) "The first hit rock number was Prithibi ta naki chhoto hote hote, composed by Gautam Chatterjee in 1995 and performed by Krosswindz in Abar Bochhor Kuri Porey."

Critical commentary remarked in the deeper meaning within the song's lyrics as being "one of the most celebrated anthems for the doomed youth of technocracy". It is stated that the song's narrator remained conscious of the ontologically liminal person, which is a result of technocracy and remaining immobile for a period of time. The narrator is both ridiculing and inquisitive to the "alienated selves of the urban Bengali middle class". The modern society is being rendered to a state of being alone together for which marvels of technology such as telephones and television are among the ones to be held responsible. The song concludes by saying that the stars that are light-years away are closer to us than our loved ones "because one can see stars far more easily than their dear ones".

== Other versions ==
In the 2006 Bollywood film, Gangster, a song "Bheegi Bheegi" was released which was originally composed by Mayur Puri and sung by James, and it was adapted from the song by Moheener Ghoraguli.

== Legacy ==
In a tribute to Moheener Ghoraguli in 2013, the Tollywood film Hanuman.com, included the song and was remarked by the protagonist Prosenjit Chatterjee as, "The more I hear the lyrics, I realize how Goutam Chattopadhyay acted as a pathbreaker by composing a prophetic number Prithibita naki chhoto hote hote. The song has given life to the film."

In November 2023, Coca Cola organised a two–day event in Kolkata which included music performances by artists such as Fossils, Lakkhichhara, Euphoria, When Chai Met Toast, Amit Trivedi, Coke Studio Bangla etc. Coke Studio Bangla paid tribute to MG by performing the song, Prithibi ta naki chhoto hote hote.

== Personnel ==
The musicians who were involved in the production and release of this song are:

- Gautam Chattopadhyay – composer and lyricist
- Pallab Roy – lyricist
- Bonnie Chakraborty – vocalist
- Debjit Biswas – sound
- Hiran Mitra – cover

== See also ==
- Shudhijon Shono
- Mohin Ekhon O Bondhura
