= Shudhijon Shono =

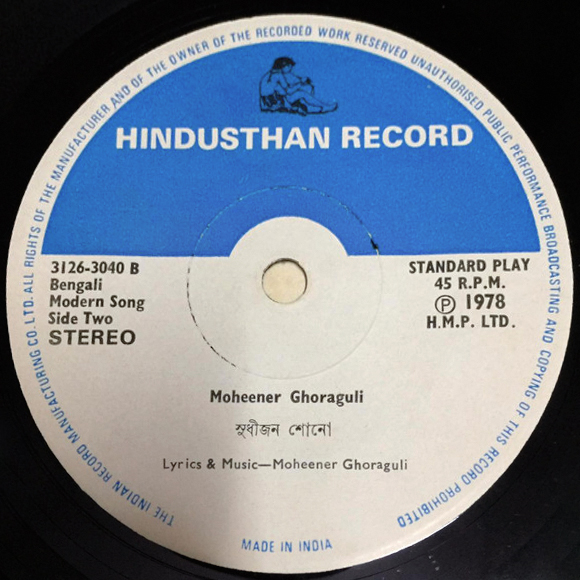
- Side B of IN retail single

Single by Moheener Ghoraguli

from the album Ajaana UDonto bostu ba Aw-Oo-Baw
- Language: Bengali
- A-side: "Ajaana UDonto bostu ba Aw-Oo-Baw"
- Released: 21 August 1978
- Recorded: 1978
- Studio: Chitrabani
- Genre: rock
- Length: 3:08
- Label: Hindusthan Record (IN)
- Composer: Gautam Chattopadhyay
- Lyricist: Ranjon Ghoshal
- Producer: Moheener Ghoraguli

Moheener Ghoraguli singles chronology
"Ajaana UDonto bostu ba Aw-Oo-Baw" (1978)	"Shudhijon Shono" (1978)	"Ayee Surey Bohudurey" (1979)

"Shudhijon Shono" ("Listen, Gentlemen") is a song by Bengali rock band Moheener Ghoraguli, featured on their 1978 maxi single, Ajaana UDonto bostu ba Aw-Oo-Baw. Written by Ranjon Ghoshal, composed by Gautam Chattopadhyay, and sung by Tapesh Bandyopadhyay, Tapas Das and Ranjon. The lyrics is a call to the people of the city, while bass guitar carry the music. It was one of the band's initial songs such as "Haay, Bhalobasi" and "Bheshe Ashey Kolkata".

== Release ==
"Shudhijon Shono" was released by Hindusthan Record as the B-side of a Standard play 7-inch single 45-rpm record "Ajaana UDonto bostu ba Aw-Oo-Baw".

== Alternative and live versions ==
In 1999, an Alternative version of "Shudhijon Shono" was released on the album Khyapar Gaan, and performed by Krosswindz.

A live version was played at Ambedkar Bhavan, Bangalore in Indian on 17 February 2007 at the First Rock Concert – Remembering Mohiner Ghoraguli by Shilajit Majumdar.

== Personnel ==
- Gautam Chattopadhyay - lead guitar
