= Insomnia (band) =

Bengali psychedelic rock band

- The mark of sleeplessness

Background information
- Origin: Kolkata, West Bengal, India
- Genres: Nu metal; progressive rock; Bengali rock
- Years active: 1998–2010
- Labels: Independent, Asha Audio, His Master's Voice
- Members: Sayantan Neogi (Ninnai), Rajarshi Barman (Dodo), Souvik Gupta (Savvy Gupta), Bodhisattwa Ghosh (Bodhi), Prasenjit Chakrabutty (Pom), Rohit Nandi (Rohit), Manager - Rahul Mehra (Paiya)
- Past members: Subhajit Roy Chowdhury (Subho), Sudipto Banerjee (Buti), Dipanjan Mukherjee (Ebu), Santanu Das Roy (Tito), Ayan Dasgupta (Boom), Sougata Basu (Papa), Subhodip Banerjee (Subho),

Insomnia (Bengali: ইনসমনিয়া) was the first psychedelic rock band from Kolkata, West Bengal. The band's repertoire included both English and Bengali songs. The band has an album each in English (Cry of the Spirit - self released) and Bengali (Proloyer Shomoye – Asha Audio). Insomnia were also quite adept at executing live music for theatre, being part of the act itself, in plays such as Peacewards (directed by Jayant Kripalani, produced by Red Curtain Productions, based on monologues written by Manjula Padmanabhan), a 3rd theatre version of Rokto Korobi (written by Rabindranath Tagore, conceptualised by Badal Sarkar, directed by Parnab Mukherjee, starring Sudipta Chakraborty) and numerous other plays. "Opekkha" from their Bengali album Proloyer Shomoye was part of the original soundtrack of the first Bengali sex comedy movie Aamra (produced by Venkatesh films, directed by Mainak Bhaumik, cast – Parambrata Chatterjee, Jisshu Sengupta, Rudranil Ghosh, Nilanjana, Ananya Chatterjee, Kaushik Ghosh, Rajatava Datta, Momo).

== Discography ==
Cry of the Spirit

Studio album by Insomnia
- Released: September 2004 (India)
- Recorded: September–October 2003
- Genres: Progressive rock, psychedelic rock
- Label: Independent Label
- Producer: Sumit Ray

Year of release	Title	Label	Language
2004	Cry of the Spirit	Independent Label	English
2006	Proloyer Shomoye	Asha Audio	Bengali
2008	Parallel Universe (The Underground – Kolkata)	His Master's Voice	English
2012	Untitled	Asha Audio	Bengali

=== Cry of the Spirit ===
Cry of the Spirit' was the debut album of Insomnia. The album showed the original sound of Insomnia which shifted heavily later on after moving to Bengali language abandoning English.

Insomnia recorded their debut album titled Cry of the Spirit at Studio Vibrations, Kolkata between September and October 2003. As the name suggests, the album is about a human being's loneliness of the soul. Musically, the album is loosely based on experimental Classic Rock, amalgamated with Post-modern synthesizers. Mixed at Studio Vibrations and produced by brand developer Sumit Roy, the album was released in September 2004 at Someplace Else, The Park and is on private circulation and available on SoundCloud.

=== Proloyer Shomoye ===
Proloyer Shomoye

Studio album by Insomnia
- Released: September 2006 (India)
- Recorded: September–October 2003
- Genres: Bengali metal, nu metal
- Label: Asha Audio
- Producers: Jojo, Potla

Proloyer Shomoye is the second full-length studio album by, Insomnia, and their first Bengali album. It was recorded at Dream Digital Inc., Kolkata between May and August 2006. Proloyer Shomoye is a reflected contemporary times that we live in, the times of turbulence. With this album, Insomnia radically changed their sonic direction to New Age Alternative. Mixed at Dream Digital Inc. and mastered at Edensound Mastering, Melbourne, the album was launched in September 2006 at Octane, Gariahat Mall under the banner of Asha Audio.

== The Band's journey ==
Insomnia plugged in for the first time in 1999 as the South Point High School (Kolkata India) school band. The initial line up of Subho, Rohit, Dipanjan and Bodhi went on to win most of the school fests in the following years playing mostly covers of every genre. The next three years the band went through self-discovery writing their own music. It was in 2001 when Dodo and Buti joined completing the band. The bass player, Dipanjan, also the founding member, left and Tito joined. Ninnai, a long time friend of the band was the last to join as the second vocalist in 2002 end. The band's sound was defined by Bodhi's poetry and elegant playing, Buti's arrangements, Subho's wild stage antiques, Ninnai's psychedelic performances, Dodo's emotion rich voice and Rohit's act as the backbone. Ultimately the psychedelic sound evolved to a heavy mix of rock, electronica and western classical genres.

Insomnia's first show as a professional outfit was on 7 July 2002 in Music World, Park Street and it went on to reach great heights for the next two years as the kids were recognized as true rockers. They worked with veteran ad man Sumit Roy who drove the band to create a sound what they called Visionary Rock.

In 2004 Buti left to join Cactus while a dispute among members led to Subho, one of the founder members and driving force of the band leaving. Since then the band went through many line-up changes. However against all odds they stuck on to continue explore and create more music.

Noteworthy performances by the band:

- Insomnia were Eastern Zonal Winners and All – India 2nd Runners up at Castrol Garage Rock, 2003 held in Mumbai
- Insomnia were Finalists at the All – India Rock band competition at Springfest 2003, IIT Kharagpur
- Insomnia have rocked crowds in schools and colleges on the following occasions:
  - R G Kar Medical College, Freshers' welcome, 2003
  - South Point High School, Melting Point, 2004
  - Pailan Institute of Management, Freshers' welcome, 2004
  - Calcutta Medical College, Annual Fest, 2004
  - Jadavpur University, Electrical Engineering, Freshers' welcome, 2004
  - Jadavpur University, Civil Engineering, Freshers' welcome, 2004
  - District Interact Council, Annual Fest, 2004
  - St. Xavier's College Kolkata, Xavotsav 2004
  - District Rotaract Council, Annual Fest, 2005
  - Dr. B. C. Roy Engineering College, Durgapur, Annual Fest, 2005
  - Meghnad Saha Institute of Technology 2005
  - Jadavpur University, Arts Faculty, Sanskriti 2006
  - St. Xavier's College Kolkata, Xavotsav 2007
  - Institute of Technology & Marine Engineering, Impulse 2007
  - Gupta College of Technology & Science, Asansol, Panacea 2007
  - JIS College of Engineering, Kalyani, Annual Fest 2007
  - Jadavpur University, Arts Faculty, Sanskriti 2007
  - Gyan Ghosh Memorial College, Annual Fest 2007
  - Heritage Institute of Technology, Eclecia 2007
  - Calcutta Medical College, Annual Fest 2007
  - Bankura Sammilani Medical College, Synapse 2007
  - St. Stephen's School, Dum Dum, Reunion 2007
  - Kalyani Govt. College of Engineering, Annual Fest 2007
  - Bethune College, Annual Fest 2007
  - South Point Reunion 2008
  - West Bengal National University of Juridical Sciences (NUJS), Outlawed 2008
  - Techno India Hooghly, Chinsura, Verbena 2008
  - Sikkim Manipal University, Ballygunge Phari, Kolkata, Live Wire 2008
  - Dinabandhu Andrews Institute of Technology & Management, Razzmatazz 2008
  - St. Thomas' College of Engineering and Technology, Atria 2008
  - Government College of Engineering & Ceramic Technology, Jagriti 2008
  - Carmel Convent School, Jamshedpur, 10th Anniversary Celebrations, 2008
  - Ramakrishna Mission Shilpapeeth Belghoria, Boreas 2008
  - Saroj Mohan Institute of Technology, Guptipara, Annual Fest 2008
  - Calcutta Boys School, Annual Fest 2008
  - Carmel High School, Kolkata, Annual Fest 2008
  - Pailan Institute of Engineering, Annual Fest 2008
  - Shri Shikshayatan College, Srijan 2008
  - South Point High School, Annual Fest 2008
  - Army Institute of Management, Kolkata, Inferno 2009(Annual Fest)
  - Techno India Hooghly, Chinsura, Verbena 2009
  - Hooghly Engineering and Technology College, Festinobeats 2010
- Insomnia organised the concert, Reach Out and played in it along with the leading English bands of Calcutta. The concert also featured Usha Uthup, Amyt Datta and Nandan Bagchi and raised funds for the children of Reach.
- In 2003, Insomnia featured in Peacewards, a Red Curtain productions play based on monologues by Manjula Padmanabhan. The play was directed by Jayant Kripalani and saw the band live on stage doing a musical narration
- In 2003 again, Insomnia soundscaped a third theatre version of Rabindranath Tagore's play, Rakta Karabi, which was directed by Parnab Mukherjee and featured actress Sudipta Chakraborty. In 2004, under the same director, Insomnia soundscaped third theatre versions of Shakespeare's Measure for Measure and King Lear
- In November 2004, Insomnia became the first band in the city to have an unplugged concert in the bag. It was held at Caffeine, Elgin Road
- In April 2005, Insomnia performed along with Fossils, Aasma and Neha Bhasin in aid of the Tsunami victims in the 'One World' concert held at La Martiniere for boys grounds
- In November 2005, Insomnia went to Thimphu, Bhutan and performed at the country's premier night club, Space 34
- In January 2006, Insomnia launched themselves in the Bangla rock circuit at 'Republic Rock' along with acts from Bangladesh such as Warfaze, Artcell, Metalmaze, ArboVirus and acts from West Bengal such as Lakkhichara, Cactus and Fossils
- In December 2007, Insomnia put up a concert as part of the centenary celebration of TATA steel in Jamshedpur in the coveted XLRI auditorium.
- In January 2008, Insomnia was part of the historic Mohiner Ghoraguli tribute concert (organized by Ranjon Ghoshal), 'Abar Bochhor Tirish Pore', which had a complete Philharmonic Orchestra (Conducted by Abraham Mazumder) playing. The Concert was held at the big lawn, Nicco Park and had a turnout of about 30,000 people.
- In January 2009, Insomnia raised funds for leukemia patient, 3-year-old Aarav Seal along with Cactus and Bickram Ghosh. The concert was an initiative by Red FM, Power FM and Aamar FM.

== See also ==
- Bangladeshi rock
- Mohiner Ghoraguli
- Cactus
- Lakkhichhara
- Bhoomi
- Chandrabindoo
- Fossils
- Cassini's Division
- Underground Authority
