= Tapas Das =

Indian musical artist (1954–2023)

Tapas Bapi Das
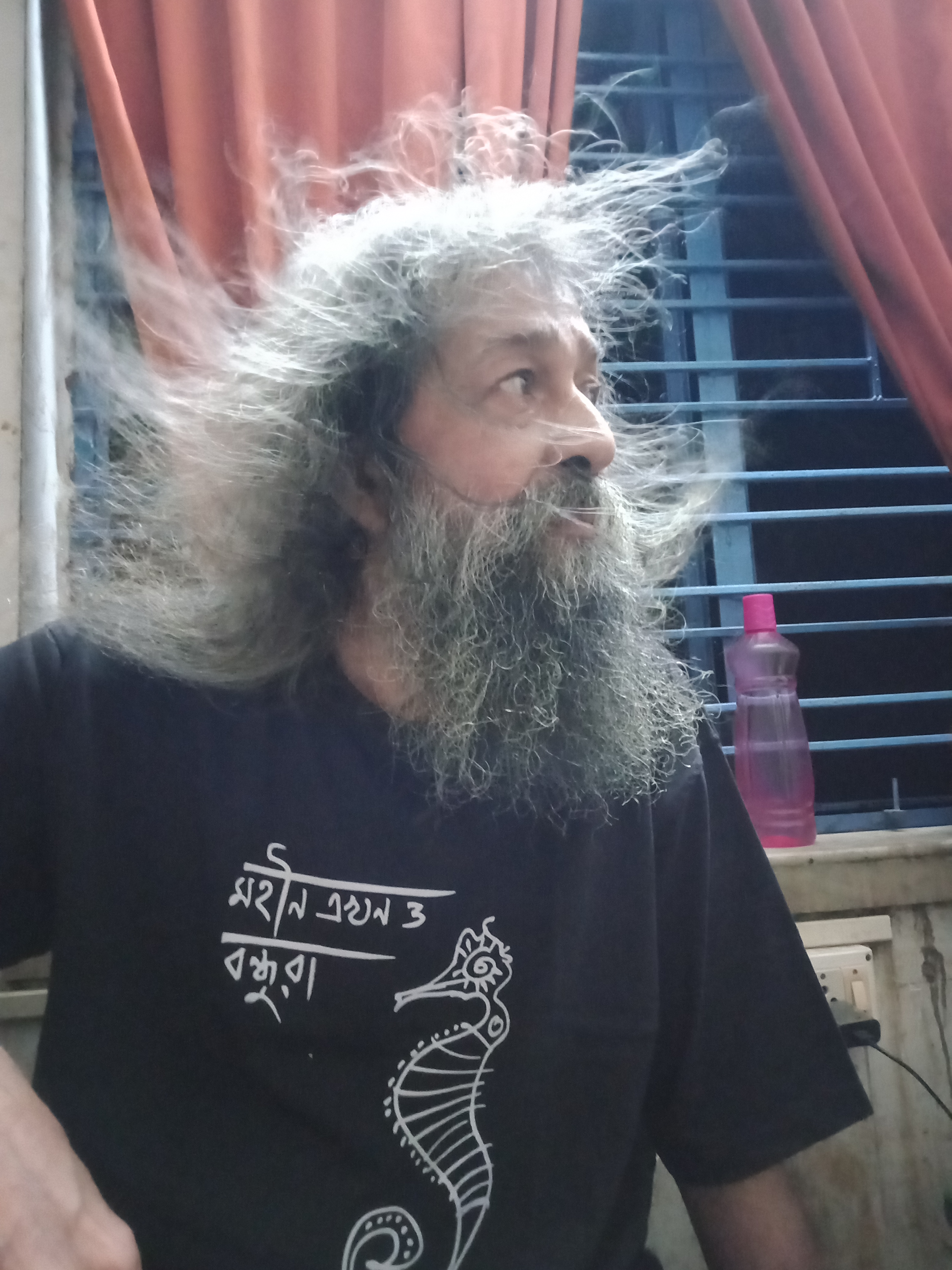
- Das in 2020

Background information
- Also known as: Tapas Bapi
- Born: Tapas Das; 22 September 1954
- Origin: Calcutta, West Bengal, India
- Died: 25 June 2023 (aged 68) SSKM Hospital, Kolkata, West Bengal, India
- Genres: folk-rock
- Occupations: singer-songwriter; guitarist
- Formerly of: Moheener Ghoraguli

Tapas Bapi Das (also known as Bapida, or its variations Bapi Da, Bapi-da, (22 September 1954 – 25 June 2023) was an Indian singer-songwriter and guitarist. He was one of the founding members of the Bengali rock band Moheener Ghoraguli established in 1975 in Kolkata.

== Early life and career ==
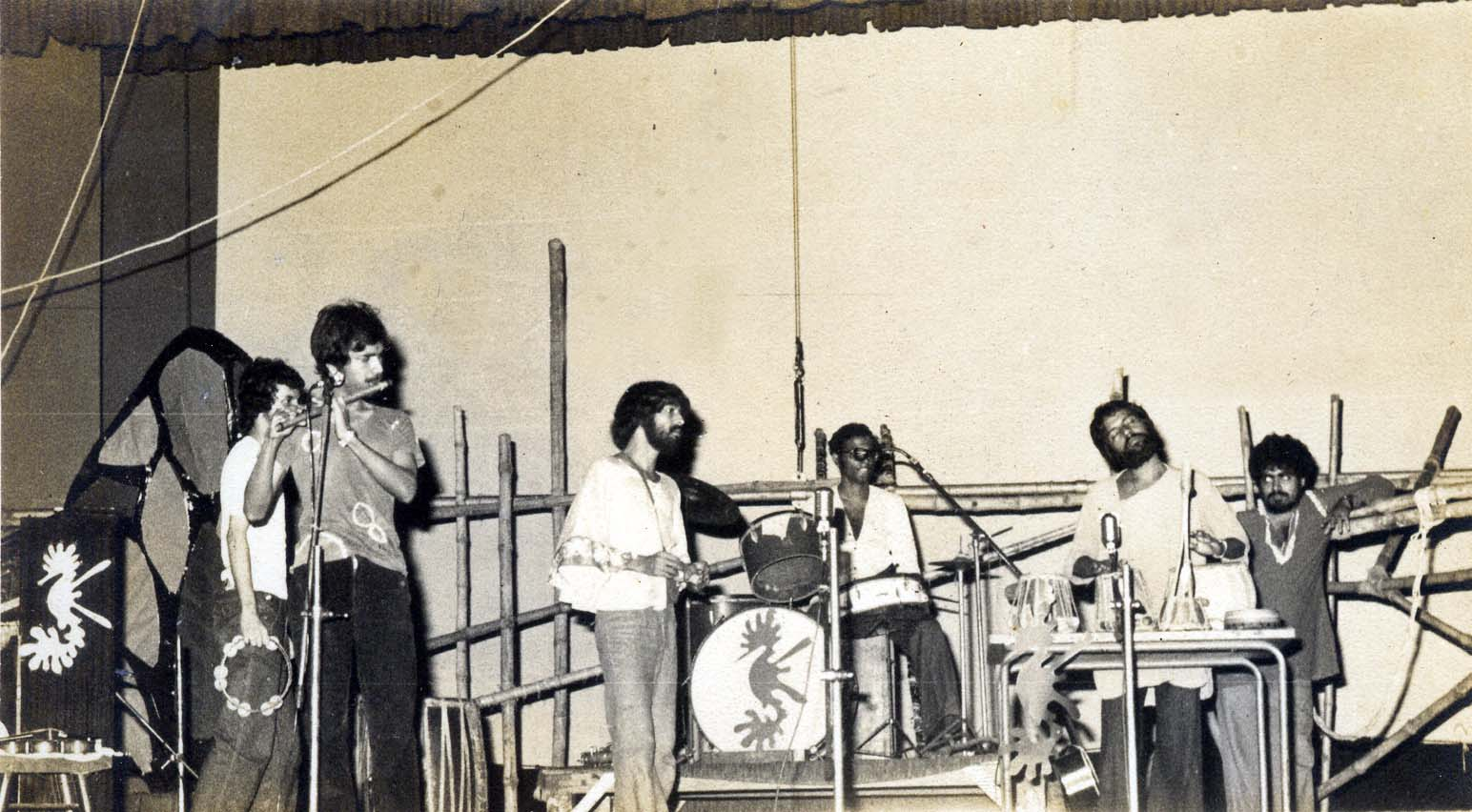
Moheener Ghoraguli at Rabindra Sadan in 1979. Left to right: Raja Banerjee, Pradip Chatterjee, Tapas Das, Pranab Sengupta, Gautam Chattopadhyay and Ranjon Ghoshal.

Born on 22 September 1954 into a typical Bengali family, the fourth son of Narayan Chandra Das and Jyotsna Das, Das's musical journey started from an early age. His taste in music was wide and diverse. He also considered his mother, Jyotsna Das as his first Guru or teacher. A self-taught guitarist, Das began playing the instrument during college. In 1975, he became part of the first Bengali rock band Moheener Ghoraguli, along with Gautam Chattopadhyay, Pradip Chatterjee, Ranjon Ghoshal, Bishwanath Chattopadhyay, Abraham Mazumdar, and Tapesh Bandopadhyay.

In 2015, he formed a Bengali band called Moheen Ekhon O Bondhura and released the EP album Mohin Ekhon O Bondhura with Lagnajita Chakraborty, Malabika Brahma and Titas Bhramar Sen. The album consisted of five songs and was a tribute to Moheener Ghoraguli.

== Death ==
Das died of lung cancer at the SSKM hospital at 9:30 AM on 25 June 2023, at the age of 68. He was admitted to the SSKM hospital under the auspices of the West Bengal government on 3 January 2023 before his death.

== Discography ==
=== Moheener Ghoraguli albums ===
- Shangbigno Pakhikul O Kolkata Bishayak (1977)
- Ajaana UDonto bostu ba Aw-Oo-Baw (1978)
- Drishyomaan Moheener Ghoraguli (1979)

=== Other ===
- Mohin Ekhon O Bondhura
