= Mohin Ekhon O Bondhura =

Moheen Ekhon O Bondhura

EP by Tapas Das, Lagnajita Chakraborty, Malabika Brahma, Titas Bhramar Sen
- Released: 6 October 2015
- Venue: Kolkata
- Length: 24:56
- Label: DBS Music
- Producer: DBS Music

Mohin Ekhon O Bondhura (Bengali: মহীন এখন ও বন্ধুরা) is a Bengali EP album by Tapas Das, Lagnajita Chakraborty, Malabika Brahma, Titas Bhramar Sen. It was released on 6 October in 2015 by DBS Music in India. The album consists of five songs and a tribute albums to Moheener Ghoraguli, was an Indian Bengali rock band.

== Tracklist ==
No.	Title	Lyrics	Music	Lead vocal(s)	Length
1.	"Onek Bhabbo Ami"	Tapas Das	Tapas Das	Tapas Das; Titas Bhramar Sen	4:15
2.	"Ekhane Shobdohin Shobde"	Tapas Das	Tapas Das	Titas Bhramar Sen	3:08
3.	"Dekhecho Ki Chokh Khule"	Gautam Chattopadhyay, Tapash	Gautam Chattopadhyay, Tapas Das	Lagnajita Chakraborty	3:38
4.	"Keno Bhenge Jay"	Tapas Das	Tapas Das	Tapas Das	7:45
5.	"Khachar Bhitor Ochin Pakhi"	Lalon		Malabika Brahma	6:07
Total length:					24:56

== Personnel ==
- Tapas Das – vocal, composer
- Titas Bhramar Sen – vocal
- Lagnajita Chakraborty – vocal
- Malabika Brahma – vocal
- Bidesh Basu – vocal
- Suddhasatta Mitra – vocals
- Gautam Chattopadhyay – composer (posthumous)
- Pradip Chatterjee – flute
- Dhurba Basu Roy – guitar, music arrangement (1-4)
