= Gangster: A Love Story =

2006 Indian film by Anurag Basu

- Theatrical release poster
- Directed by: Anurag Basu
- Screenplay by: Mahesh Bhatt; Anurag Basu; Dialogues by: Girish Dhamija
- Story by: Mahesh Bhatt
- Produced by: Mahesh Bhatt; Mukesh Bhatt
- Starring: Emraan Hashmi; Kangana Ranaut; Shiney Ahuja; Gulshan Grover; Vicky Ahuja
- Cinematography: Bobby Singh
- Edited by: Akiv Ali
- Music by: Songs: Pritam; Score: Raju Singh
- Production company: Vishesh Films
- Distributed by: Nimbus Motion Pictures
- Release date: 28 April 2006
- Running time: 117 minutes
- Country: India
- Language: Hindi
- Budget: ₹6.5 crore
- Box office: ₹17.93 crore

Gangster: A Love Story is a 2006 Indian Hindi-language romantic thriller film directed by Anurag Basu and produced by Mahesh Bhatt and Mukesh Bhatt under Vishesh Films. The film stars Emraan Hashmi, Kangana Ranaut (in her debut) and Shiney Ahuja. The music was composed by Pritam.

Gangster was released theatrically on 28 April 2006, and proved to be a commercial success at the box office. It received positive reviews from critics, with praise for its screenplay, soundtrack, cinematography and performances of the cast, with particular praise directed towards Ranaut's debut performance.

At the 52nd Filmfare Awards, Gangster received 10 nominations, including Best Villain (Hashmi) and Best Male Playback Singer (Zubeen Garg for "Ya Ali"), and won Best Female Debut (Ranaut).

== Plot ==
Simran, a former bar dancer from Mumbai, is living in Seoul, where she struggles with alcoholism and the trauma of her past with Daya, a gangster who fled India with her after defying his crime boss Khan. Their relationship is further scarred by the death of a young boy, Bittu, during their escape from the Mumbai police, leaving Simran emotionally shattered.

In Seoul, Simran finds comfort in Aakash, a singer at an Indian restaurant, and their friendship gradually develops into love. However, Daya returns seeking redemption and a peaceful life with Simran, unaware that she has grown close to Aakash. Tensions rise when Daya learns of their relationship, while also attempting to leave his violent past behind. Simran becomes pregnant with Aakash’s child but remains torn between both henchmen. Aakash urges her to turn Daya in for their future, while Simran refuses out of loyalty and guilt. The situation escalates when Daya kills Khan and is ultimately arrested following Simran’s conflicted involvement in a police setup.

Devastated, Simran discovers Aakash was an undercover officer who manipulated her to reach Daya. Enraged and betrayal, she fights and kills Aakash, but both are left mortally wounded in the confrontation. Aakash dies, Simran later dies by committing suicide, and Daya is executed. The story concludes with a symbolic reunion of all three, Daya, Simran and Bittu in the after life for ending.

== Cast ==
- Emraan Hashmi as Akash Kapadia
- Kangana Ranaut as Simran
- Shiney Ahuja as Daya Shankar
- Gulshan Grover as Khan
- Hitanshu Lodhia as Bittu
- Vicky Ahuja as Usman
- Jeetpal as Inspector Raghavan
- Zubeen Garg (special appearance in song "Ya Ali")
- Pritam as himself (special appearance in song "Bheegi Bheegi")

== Production ==
Pakistani cricketer Shoaib Akhtar was initially offered the role of Daya, but he turned the role down claiming, "Cricket is not only my profession but my obsession as well".

Koel Mallick was offered the role of Simran, but rejected it due to her discomfort towards the intimate and bold scenes in the script. Chitrangada Singh had also been offered the role, before Kangana Ranaut was cast.

== Reception ==
Gangster received positive reviews from critics, with praise for its screenplay, soundtrack and performances of the cast, with particular praise directed towards Ranaut's performance. Raja Sen of Rediff awarded the film 3.5 stars (out of 5) and stated that ‘‘Ranaut is a remarkable find, the actress comes across with great conviction. Hers is the pivotal character and an extremely difficult role to essay, but she manages it well. Ranaut's nuances [of an alcoholic dancer] are disconcertingly realistic’’. Praising Hashmi's performance he further added, ‘‘His character is an understated one, and he manages to keep it that way. There is no unnecessary bluster or melodrama, and he does a pretty believable job. There is something lazy about his acting, by which I mean he makes the job look easy’’. Vinayak Chakraborty of Hindustan Times praised Basu's direction, noting that he "laces enough twists in the plot to keep surprising you and "keeps the tension quotient high at all times, cunningly moving his script from one climax point to the other. The critic concluded the movie as "definitely the director’s best work yet - better than 2004’s Murder." Film critic Rajeev Masand of CNN-IBN wrote that "The film works primarily because it’s an engaging story that’s neither predictable nor plagarised [sic]. Is it based on underworld don Abu Salem’s life? I don’t think so, and quite frankly I don’t even care. What I do care about, however, is the director’s conscious attempt to abandon clichés in exchange for originality. And for that reason, Gangster is worth a watch".

== Soundtrack ==
The soundtrack is composed by Pritam Chakraborty. The complete album consisted of five original tracks and four remixes. Saregama brought the music rights of the film. The song "Bheegi Bheegi" is a composition adapted from the song "Prithibi Ta Naki Chhoto Hote Hote" by Moheener Ghoraguli, covered earlier by the Kolkata-based band Krosswindz. Singer Zubeen Garg had first sung "Tu Hi Meri Shab Hai" but later in the released version was dubbed by KK. "Ya Ali" is an Interpolation the Kuwaiti pop song "Ya Ghali" by the Kuwaiti band Guitara.

Gangster

Soundtrack album by Pritam Chakraborty
- Released: 1 December 2005 (Digital Release); 28 April 2006 (Film)
- Genre: Feature Film soundtrack
- Length: 45:46
- Labels: Saregama; Universal Music India; Sony Music India
- Producer: Pritam Chakraborty

Pritam Chakraborty chronology
Fight Club – Members Only (2005)	Gangster (2005)	Ankahee (2006)

=== Track list ===
All music is composed by Pritam Chakraborty.

No.	Title	Lyrics	Singer(s)	Length
1.	"Tu Hi Meri Shab Hai"	Sayeed Quadri	KK	6:26
2.	"Bheegi Bheegi"	Mayur Puri	James	5:43
3.	"Lamha Lamha"	Neelesh Misra	Abhijeet Bhattacharya	5:23
4.	"Ya Ali"	Sayeed Quadri	Zubeen Garg	4:51
5.	"Tu Hi Meri Shab Hai" (Euro Mix)	Sayeed Quadri	KK	5:12
6.	"Mujhe Mat Roko"	Sayeed Quadri	Kavita Seth	4:09
7.	"Lamha Lamha (not used in the film)"	Neelesh Misra	Abhijeet Bhattacharya & Sunidhi Chauhan
8.	"Tu Hi Meri Shab Hai" (Remix)	Sayeed Quadri	KK	5:01
Total length:				45:46

=== Reception ===
The soundtrack was popular upon release with songs like "Ya Ali", "Tu Hi Meri Shab Hai" and "Bheegi Bheegi" topping the charts and being consequently declared chartbusters within a week of their release. Gangster became the fifth best-selling album of 2006 in India selling over 16,00,000 units.

== Awards and nominations ==
Award Ceremony	Category	Recipient	Result	Ref.(s)
52nd Filmfare Awards	Best Female Debut	Kangana Ranaut	Won	
52nd Filmfare Awards	Best Villain	Emraan Hashmi	Nominated	
52nd Filmfare Awards	Best Male Playback Singer	Zubeen Garg (for "Ya Ali")	Nominated	
52nd Filmfare Awards	Best Story	Mahesh Bhatt	Nominated	
52nd Filmfare Awards	Best Screenplay	Anurag Basu	Nominated	
52nd Filmfare Awards	Best Dialogue	Girish Dhamija	Nominated	
52nd Filmfare Awards	Best Cinematography	Bobby Singh	Nominated	
52nd Filmfare Awards	Best Editing	Akiv Ali	Nominated	
52nd Filmfare Awards	Best Sound Design	Akiv Ali	Nominated	
52nd Filmfare Awards	Best Action	Parvez Kiran	Nominated	
8th IIFA Awards	Best Actress	Kangana Ranaut	Nominated	
8th IIFA Awards	Best Female Debut	Kangana Ranaut	Won	
8th IIFA Awards	Best Villain	Emraan Hashmi	Nominated	
8th IIFA Awards	Best Male Playback Singer	KK (for "Tu Hi Meri Shab Hai")	Nominated	
8th IIFA Awards	Best Male Playback Singer	Zubeen Garg (for "Ya Ali")	Nominated	
8th IIFA Awards	Best Screenplay	Anurag Basu	Nominated	
8th IIFA Awards	Best Dialogue	Girish Dhamija	Nominated	
Global Indian Film Awards	Best Actress	Kangana Ranaut	Nominated	
Global Indian Film Awards	Best Female Debut	Kangana Ranaut	Won	
Global Indian Film Awards	Best Music Director	Pritam	Nominated	
Global Indian Film Awards	Best Male Playback Singer	Zubeen Garg (for "Ya Ali")	Won	
Asian Festival of First Films	Best Actress	Kangana Ranaut	Won	
Bollywood Movie Awards	Best Female Debut	Kangana Ranaut	Won	
Screen Awards	Most Promising Newcomer – Female	Kangana Ranaut	Won	
Screen Awards	Best Male Playback Singer	Zubeen Garg (for "Ya Ali")	Nominated	
10th Zee Cine Awards	Best Female Debut	Kangana Ranaut	Won	
10th Zee Cine Awards	Best Villain	Shiney Ahuja	Nominated	
10th Zee Cine Awards	Best Male Playback Singer	KK (for "Tu Hi Meri Shab Hai")	Nominated	
10th Zee Cine Awards	Best Male Playback Singer	Zubeen Garg (for "Ya Ali")	Nominated	
10th Zee Cine Awards	Best Background Score	Raju Singh	Nominated	
10th Zee Cine Awards	Best Story	Mahesh Bhatt	Nominated	
10th Zee Cine Awards	Best Screenplay	Anurag Basu	Nominated	
10th Zee Cine Awards	Best Editing	Akiv Ali	Nominated	
10th Zee Cine Awards	Best Track of the Year	"Ya Ali"	Nominated	
Stardust Awards	Superstar of Tomorrow – Female	Kangana Ranaut	Won	
