= U/A =

U/A may refer to:

- U/A certificate, a censor rating given by the Central Board of Film Certification of India
- Urinalysis
- U/A (album), a 2008 album by Chandrabindoo
