= Prithibi =

Indian Bengali rock band

- Origin: Kolkata, West Bengal, India
- Genres: 80s glam rock; Alternative Rock; Bangla Rock
- Years active: 2005–present
- Members: Kaushik Chakraborty; Deep; Debasish; Deepayan; Debangshu
- Past members: Aniruddha; Arunangshu; Arnab; Prosanto; Raja; Roni; Abhijit; Souvik; Saptarshi; Dipu; Palash Babumoshai; Pom; Puff; Kunal; Riku; Supran; Subhojit; Paromanu; Amin; Samarpan; Sharad; Bubun
- Website: prithibimusic.com

Prithibi (Bengali: পৃথিবী) is a Bengali rock band officially formed in Kolkata, India in the year 2005. But its original formation goes back to 2001 at Ashutosh College. Kaushik (vocals), Bubun (guitars), Prosanto (bass), Arnab (drums), Samarpan (guitars) and Amin (keyboards), were the team during whose time, the band achieved a stable group of members and received its peak success. The band became more popular with audiences when they stood first runner up in a competition, Band-e-Mataram held in Kolkata by a music channel, Sangeet Bangla, record label Asha Audio and Sangbad Pratidin in 2005.

In December 2019, the band got dissolved due to some internal issues as three of the members left the group. In January 2020, Kaushik Chakraborty renamed the band as "Reincarnation 2020" and released their first single "Mukti", with a completely new set of artists — Koushik (lead vocals, composer, lyricist), Deep (bass, backing vocals), Debasish (drums, percussions), Deepayan (keyboard, backing vocal) and Debangshu (lead guitar). Arunangshu (Rhythm Guitarist) left the band in 2024.

== Genre ==
Their music has been a blend of various genres like classic rock, 80s glam rock, metal and Bengali rock along with modern poetical lyrics written and composed by Kaushik. However, after the major line up change in 2020, the band has shifted to Alternative Rock music.

== History ==
In 2001, when three Ashutosh College students, Kaushik, Abhijit and Souvik joined to form a band, "Prithibi" was found. Before forming the band, three of them used to jam together at the canteen corner. Among them Kaushik was already a solo artiste and had done many projects in and outside Kolkata. But, he was searching for a band to create music.

The band experienced a flurry of line-up changes until 2005, by which time a sort of permanency was attained – Kaushik (vocals), Bubun (guitars), Prosanto (bass), Arnab (drums), Samarpan (guitars) and Amin (keyboards). 2005 was also the year when "Prithibi" stood first runner up in the competition 'Band-e-Mataram'.

By the end of 2007 keyboardist Amin left the band for some of his personal reasons. And followed the exit of Samarpan in 2010. And Raja joined as the new guitarist. Their guitarist, Bubun, died on 17 November 2012. Later Sharad Diyali joined as the guitarist of the band. In November 2023, they performed their first show in the USA, which included a six city tour.

== Discography ==
Release	Type	Year	Notes
Band-e-Mataram	Promotional Entries	2005	Demo recording submitted for a music contest, where Prithibi finished as runners-up
25th Anniversary Collection - Vol One	EP	2007	Contains five tracks revisiting and reworking material from their early phase
25th Anniversary Collection - Vol Two	EP	2011	Follow-up EP featuring additional reinterpreted tracks from earlier releases
Cholo Ure Jai	Single	2018	Promotional song for a film
Mukti	Single	2020	Marked the band’s return after reformation, with themes centered on personal freedom
Ajana Highway	Single	2020	Reflects the experiences and challenges of touring musicians; released with a video
Prithibi Bhalo Theko	Single	2020	A song carrying a message of hope and well-being, influenced by global humanitarian themes
Aro Kotokaal	Single	2021	
Mon Amar	Single	2022	
Bidaye Priyotama	Chapter Five(Pragoitihashik)	2026	Love,Betrayal and Revenge
