= Chandrabindoo (band) =

Indian band from Kolkata

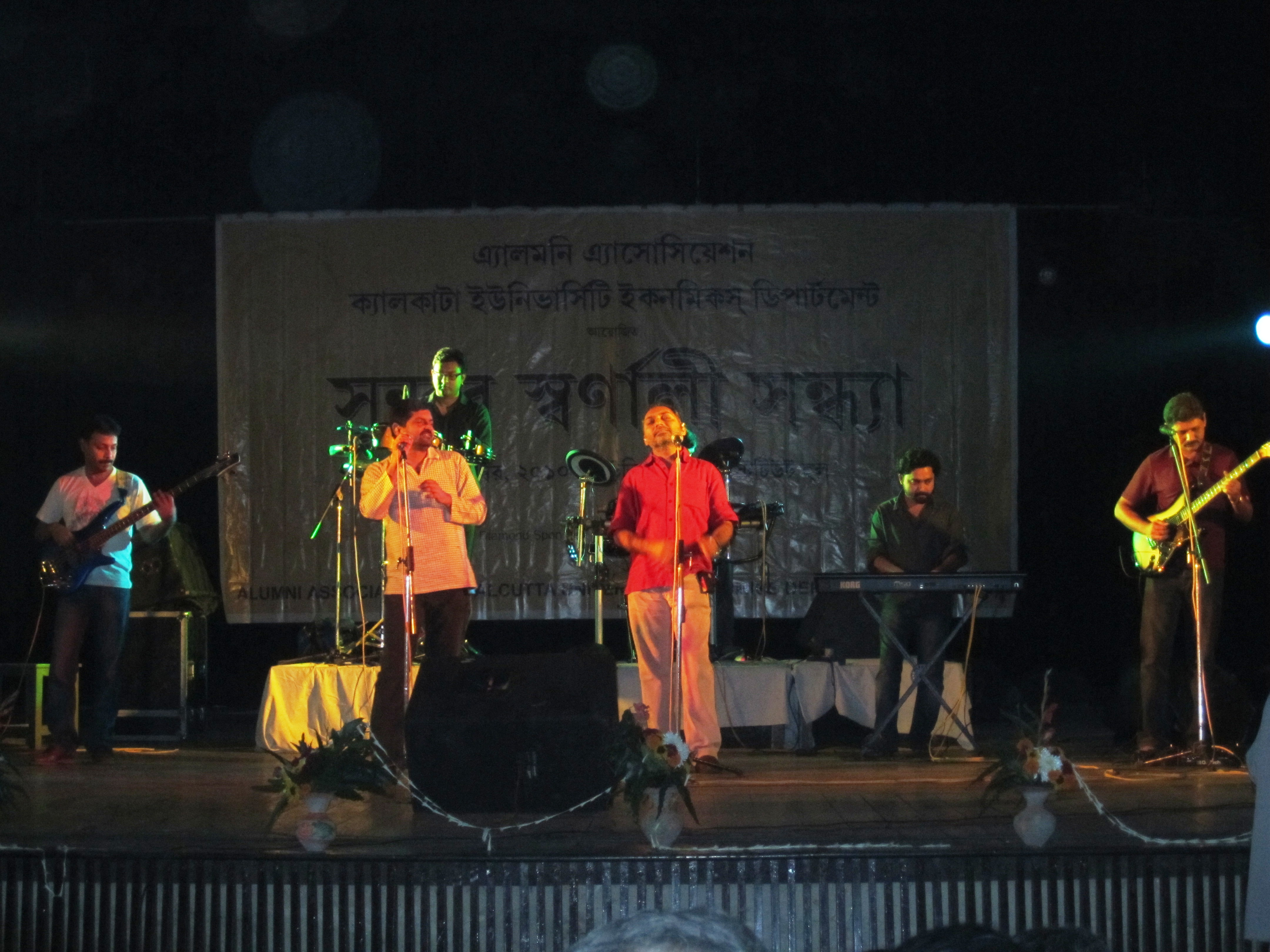
- Chandrabindoo, left to right: Arup, Saurabh, Upal, Rajshekhar, Anindya, Sibu, Surojit in 2010

Background information
- Origin: Kolkata, West Bengal, India
- Genres: Band Music, Bengali rock
- Years active: 1998–present
- Labels: Saregama, Times Music, Universal Music Group, Sagarika
- Members: Upal Sengupta; Anindya Chatterjee; Chandril Bhattacharya; Arup Podder; Surojit Mukherjee; Rajshekhar Kundu; Sibabrata Biswas; Sourabh Chatterjee; Tirthankar
- Past members: Dron Acharya; Pritam
- Website: chandrabindoo.in

Chandrabindoo (often spelled Chandrabindu), Bengali: চন্দ্রবিন্দু, based in Kolkata, is a Bengali band known for satirical, colloquial lyrics, with references to current affairs and cultural phenomena.

The band is mainly popular in the Indian city of Kolkata, and in cities like Delhi and Mumbai that have a large expatriate Bengali population.

== Name Origin ==
The band shares its name with the last letter (technically a modifier) of the Bengali alphabet, ◌̐. The name is a reference to a piece of dialogue from Sukumar Ray's হযবরল HaJaBaRaLa, a well-known work of literary nonsense in Bengali.

বেড়াল বলল, “বেড়ালও বলতে পার, রুমালও বলতে পার, চন্দ্রবিন্দুও বলতে পার।” আমি বললাম, “চন্দ্রবিন্দু কেন?”

শুনে বেড়ালটা “তাও জানো না?” বলে এক চোখ বুজে ফ্যাচ্‌ফ্যাচ্ করে বিশ্রীরকম হাসতে লাগল। আমি ভারি অপ্রস্তুত হয়ে গেলাম। মনে হল, ঐ চন্দ্রবিন্দুর কথাটা নিশ্চয় আমার বোঝা উচিত ছিল। তাই থতমত খেয়ে তাড়াতাড়ি বলে ফেললাম, “ও হ্যাঁ-হ্যাঁ, বুঝতে পেরেছি।”

বেড়ালটা খুশি হয়ে বলল, “হ্যাঁ, এ তো বোঝাই যাচ্ছে— চন্দ্রবিন্দুর চ, বেড়ালের তালব্য শ, রুমালের মা— হল চশমা। কেমন, হল তো?”

The cat said "You can call me a cat, or a handkerchief, or even a chandrabindoo". "Why a chandrabindoo?" I asked.

"Can't you tell?" said the cat, winking and sniggering in a most irritating way. I was taken aback. Perhaps I ought to have known about the chandrabindoo, I thought. "Ah!" I said quickly. "I understand".

"Of course you do,"said the Cat, pleased. "‘cha’ for chandrabindoo, ‘sha’ for birāl (cat), and ‘mā’ for rumāl (handkerchief) - that spells ‘chashma’(spectacles) Simple, isn't it?"

== Early days ==
Upal Sengupta formed Chandrabindoo in 1989 with Anindya Chatterjee, Chandril Bhattacharya and others, most of them being college friends.

The band faced many problems during the production of their first album Aar Jani Na, having to produce their demo with the help of an out-of-date sound mixer. It was released in 1998, and received an indifferent response. However, they came to the attention of Gautam Chattopadhyay of Mohiner Ghoraguli, and he recommended them to Asha Audio, who released their second album Gadha. The first public live show of Chandrabindoo was held in Gyan Manch near Rabindra Sadan, Kolkata.

== Band members ==
- Upal Sengupta – singer/ music composer/ lead vocal
- Anindya Chatterjee – singer/ music composer/ lead vocal
- Chandril Bhattacharya – lyricist/music composer/ vocal
- Arup Podder – bassist
- Surojit Mukherjee – guitarist/ arranger
- Rajshekhar Kundu – drummer
- Sibabrata Biswas aka Sibu – keyboardist
- Sourabh – percussionist

and Tirthankar as sound engineer.

== Former members ==
Chandrabindoo's former members include Subrato Lodh, Subrato Ghosh, Sukhendu Ghosh, Subhendu, Debapriyo, Tennie, Lintu, Santanu, Arindam, Pritam, Dron Acharya, Riju, Kallol, Rajesh, Riddhi, Chandan, Papa, Jisshu Sengupta, Neepabeethi Ghosh, Lopamudra Mitra.

== Discography ==
Studio Albums

- Aar Jani Na (Bengali: আর জানি না, Lit: Don't Know Any More) (1997), T-Series
- Gadha (Bengali: গাধা, Lit: Donkey) (1998), Asha Audio
- Twaker Jatna Nin (Bengali: ত্বকের যত্ন নিন, Lit: Take Care Of Your Skin) (1999), Asha Audio
- Chaw (Bengali: চ, Lit: Let's Go) (2001), Asha Audio
- Daknam (Bengali: ডাকনাম, Lit: Nickname) (2002), Sony BMG
- Juju (Bengali: জুজু, Lit: The Bugbear) (2003), Sony Music
- Hulabila (Bengali: হুলাবিলা, Lit: Hullabaloo) (2005), Sagarika
- U/A (Bengali: ইউ/এ, Lit: U/A) (2008), BIG Music
- Noy (Bengali: নয়, Lit: Nine) (2012), Kaleidoscope
- Talobasha (Bengali: টালোবাসা, Lit: A playful reduplication on the Bengali word for love) (2024), Chandrabindoo

Compilation Albums

- Chandrabindaas (Bengali: চন্দ্রবিন্দাস, Lit: Chandrabindoo is Bindaas) (2005)
- Ebhabeo Phire Asha Jae (Bengali: এভাবেও ফিরে আসা যায়, Lit: Even that's a Comeback) (2005)
- Bachhai 11 (Bengali: বাছাই ১১, Lit: Selected 11) (2006)
- Sera Chandrabindoo (Bengali: সেরা চন্দ্রবিন্দু, Lit: Best Of Chandrabindoo) (2008)

== Filmography ==
| Year | Film | Director | Notes |
|---|---|---|---|
| 2009 | Box No. 1313 | Aniruddha Bhattacharya | as Music Director |
| 2009 | Cross Connection | Abhijit Guha, Sudeshna Ray | as Lyricists |
| 2009 | Brake Fail | Kaushik Ganguly | as Playback Singers |
| 2009 | Antaheen | Aniruddha Roy Chowdhury | Anindya and Chandril as Lyricist together, They won 56th National Film Awards for National Film Award for Best Lyrics in 2010 for it |
| 2010 | Jodi Ekdin | Riingo Banerjee | Anindya and Chandril as lyricists together, Upal and Anindya made a video appearance for a song (Playback Singers) |
| 2010 | Ekti Tarar Khonje | Abhik Mukhopadhyay | as Lyricists |
| 2010 | 033 | Birsa Dasgupta | as Music Director |
| 2010 | Natobar Not Out | Amit Sen | Playback Singers; Upal and Anindya made a video appearance for a song |
| 2011 | Jiyo Kaka | Parambrata Chatterjee | as Music Director |
| 2011 | Icche | Nandita Roy, Shiboprasad Mukhopadhyay | Anindya as a Playback Singer |
| 2011 | Rang Milanti | Kaushik Ganguly | as Music Director, lyricist, Voice Artist |
| 2011 | Gosainbaganer Bhoot | Nitish Roy | as Music Director and Playback Singer(s) |
| 2012 | Aparajita Tumi | Aniruddha Roy Chowdhury | Anindya and Chandril as Lyricist |
| 2022 | Kakababur Protyaborton | Srijit Mukherji | Anindya, Upal and Chandril as Playback Singers |
| 2025 | Joto Kando Kolkatatei | Anik Dutta | Anindya, Upal as Playback Singers |

== Other work ==
They made their first international tour in July 2015, when they performed in London in aid of the Kolkata-based Child In Need Institute (CINI). Chandrabindoo is the official brand ambassador for CINI ASHA.

== See also ==
- Moheener Ghoraguli
- Music of West Bengal
