= Ranjon Ghoshal =

Indian musician (1955–2020)

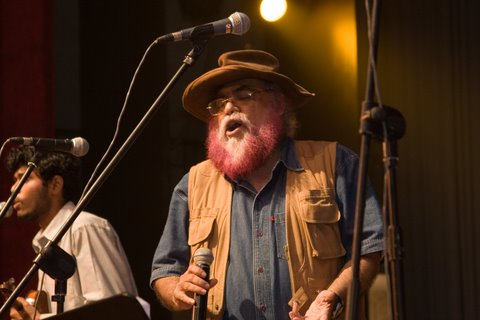
Ranjon Ghoshal

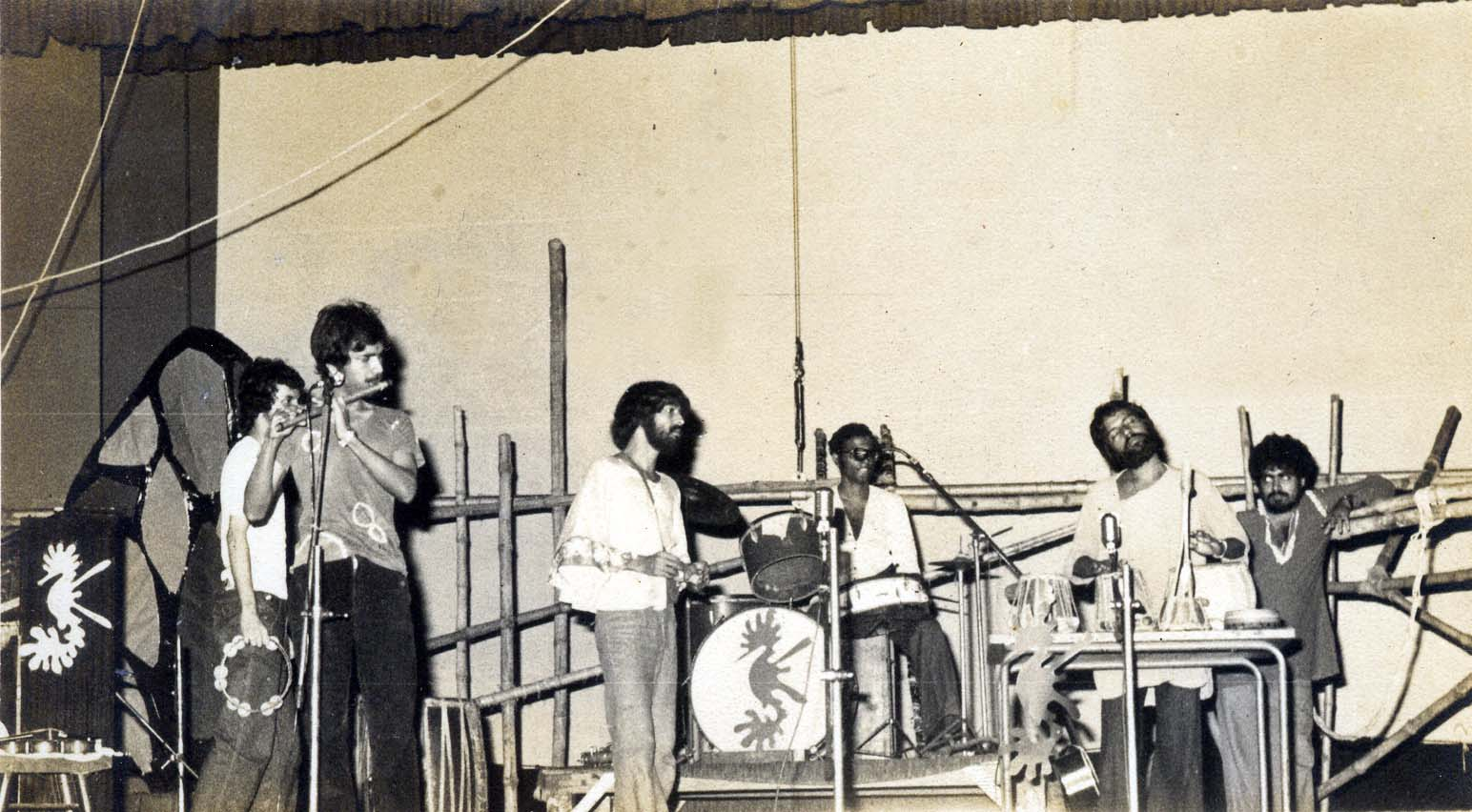
Moheener Ghoraguli in concert at Rabindra Sadan, 1979, left to right: Raja Banerjee, Pradip Chattopadhyay, Tapas Das, Pranab Sengupta, Gautam Chattopadhyay and Ranjon Ghoshal.

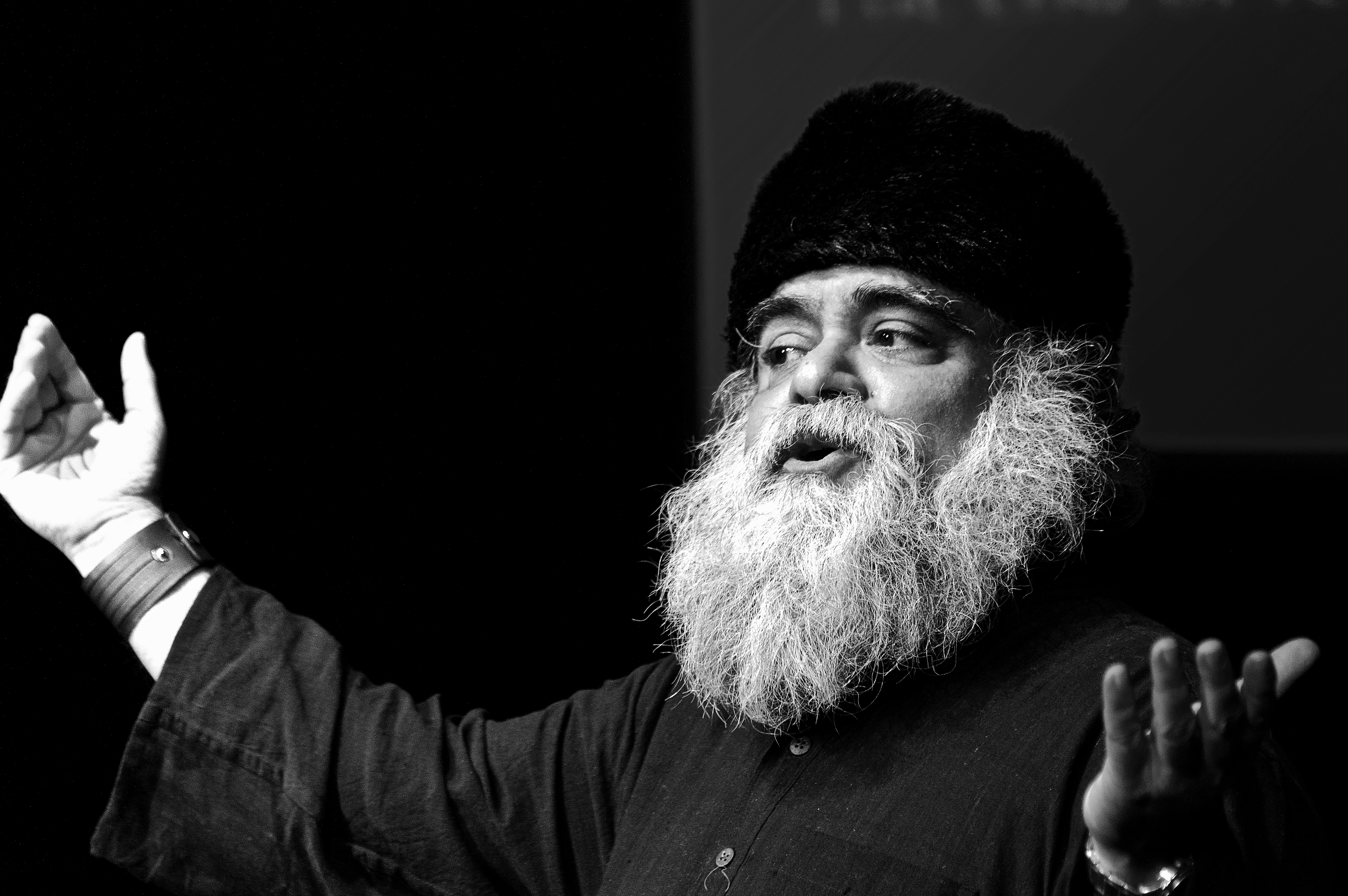
Ranjon Ghoshal portraying Rabindranath Tagore in 2011

Ranjon Ghoshal (Bengali: রঞ্জন ঘোষাল; 7 June 1955 – 9 July 2020) was an Indian theatre director and musician. He was a member of the Bengali band Moheener Ghoraguli, and ran an advertising agency, Mareech Advertising in Bangalore, apart from Forum Three, a theatre group.

== Biography ==
He was born in a small town named Memari, in Burdwan District, West Bengal to Leela (born: 1925) and late Tarapada Ghoshal (1915 - 16 February 2008), both from Barishal, now in Bangladesh. Tarapada retired from a Govt. of India's political intelligence bureau posting equivalent of an additional Superintendent of Police in 1973. Leela has always been a homemaker. Ranjon has three elder brothers, Tapan (born:1945), Swapan (born: 1947) and Chandan (born: 1950), one sister, Mala (born: 1957) and a younger brother, Kanchan (born: 1960).

On 27 April 1980, Ranjon was married to Sangeeta (née Ghosh).

A first cousin of Gautam Chattopadhyay, who founded arguably Bengal's and India's first band in 1975 along with himself and other members; Ranjon was the presenter of the band and also contributed to the lyrics. He used to handle all the media interaction and cover designing.

An electrical engineer from Jadavpur University and PGD in Industrial Management, NITIE, Mumbai, Ranjon has worked with BHEL for a few years before becoming a designer-entrepreneur. He resided in Bangalore, India with his wife Sangeeta and two sons, Indrayudh and Abhimanyu. Ranjon hosted various Bengali celebrities at his home in Bangalore which was also known as Yellow Submarine.

He was an active member of the Bangalore theatre scene, directing and performing plays in English with the group Forum Three.

Ranjon, as a part of his effort in keeping alive the spirit of Moheen songs, had organized the First Rock Concert in Bangalore and Abar Bochhor Tirish Pore in Kolkata. He had started grooming brands under a venture named 'Mind It!'.

Ghoshal died on July 9, 2020, at the age of 65.

== Discography ==
=== Moheener Ghoraguli albums ===
- Shangbigno Pakhikul O Kolkata Bishayak (1977)
- Ajaana UDonto bostu ba Aw-Oo-Baw (1978)
- Drishyomaan Moheener Ghoraguli (1979)

== Plays ==
As an Actor, Producer and Director
Name	year
ShahJahan (Bengali: শাহ্‌জাহান)	1980
Sajano Bagan (Bengali: সাজানো বাগান)	1980
Banchharam's Orchard	1981
Hayavadana	1982
The Zoo Story	1983
Mareech, the Legend	1984
Waiting for Godot	1985
End Game	1986
Ram-jatra (Bengali: রাম-যাত্রা)	1987
Baro-pishima (Bengali: বড় পিসিমা)	1988
Lathi (Bengali: লাঠি)	1990
An Audience With The King	1999
Jagannath, Story of a Half-man	2001
The Other Side of History	2006
Schweyk in the Second World War	2014
A Terrorist Hanged	2016
The Blooming Orchard	2018
A Matter of Life and Death	2018

As an Actor and Playwright
Name	year
Hello Tagore	2009
Hello Rabindranath (Bengali: হ্যালো রবীন্দ্রনাথ)	2010
A Journey With Tagore	2011

== Scandals ==
In October 2019, there were allegations of sexual harassment against Ranjon Ghoshal. Though he had initially dismissed the allegations, he finally extended a public apology for his behavior, following social media outrage. Gaurab Chatterjee, son of Moheener Ghoraguli leader Goutam Chatterjee, said "Ranjon Ghoshal is not synonymous with Moheener Ghoraguli" after these incidents. An original member of the band, Tapas Bapi Das, also did the same.
