= Bengali rock =

Bengali rock (Bengali: বাংলা রক) is a music genre in which the song lyrics are written in the Bengali language. It may refer to:

- Rock music of West Bengal
- Rock music of Bangladesh
