= Moheener Ghoraguli =

Indian rock band

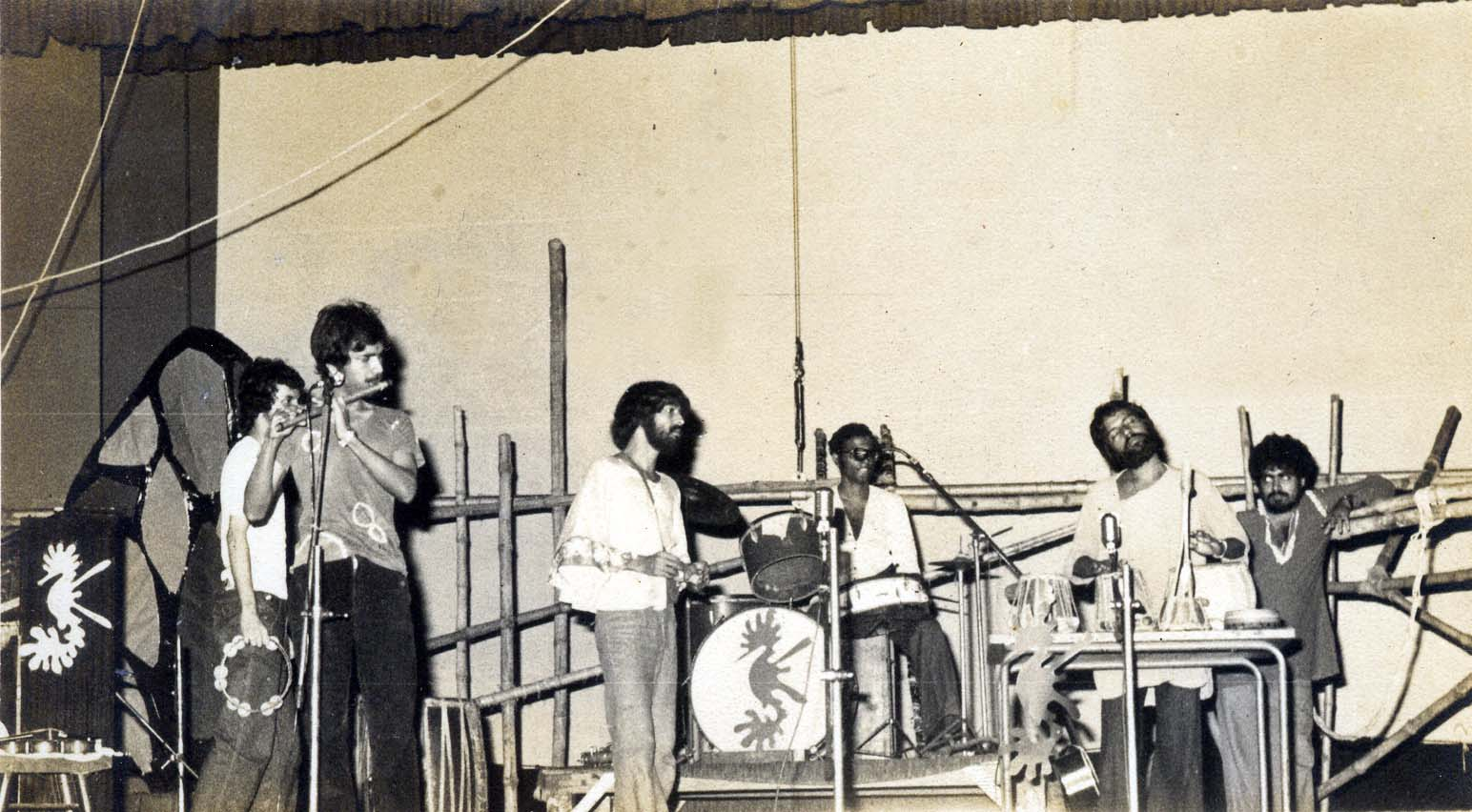
- Moheener Ghoraguli in concert at Rabindra Sadan, 1979, left to right: Raja Banerjee, Pradip Chatterjee, Tapas Das, Pranab Sengupta, Gautam Chattopadhyay and Ranjon Ghoshal. Not shown also present were Abraham Mazumdar and Biswanath Bishu Chattopadhyay.

Background information
- Origin: Kolkata, India
- Genres: Bengali folk rock; Blues rock; Psychedelic rock; Bengali rock; Jazz
- Years active: 1975–1981;
- Labels: Gathani; Hindusthan Records; Bharati Records
- Past members: Gautam Chattopadhyay; Bishu (Biswanath) Chattopadhyay; Pradip Chatterjee; Ranjon Ghoshal; Abraham Mazumdar; Tapas Das; Tapesh Bandopadhyay; Raja Banerjee

Moheener Ghoraguli (Bengali: মহীনের ঘোড়াগুলি, (Mohin’s horses) was an Indian rock group from Kolkata, established in 1975. Their music drew from a wide variety of influences, including Bengali folk, Baul, urban American folk, and jazz. They sometimes described their style as "Baul jazz."

Established in the 1970s during a period of stagnation in Bengali music, when commercial film songs were the dominant market force, the lyrics and music (and to some extent the compositions) of Moheener Ghoraguli with its leader Gautam Chattopadhyay were radically new. They were of a very personal or social nature, similar to the urban folk movement led by Bob Dylan in the 60s. Though they were almost unknown in their time, in recent years they have undergone a critical re-evaluation. The band disbanded in 1981.

In the 1990s, Gautam released a compilation of "Moheener Ghoraguli Sampadito" albums, including songs that were written and composed by Gautam Chattopadhyay himself and by other contemporary artistes and a few old songs of Moheener Ghoraguli. The albums were Aabaar Bochhor Kuri Pore in 1995, Jhora Somoyer Gaan (1996), Maya in 1998 and Khyapar Gaan in 1999.

== Later years ==
In the early years Moheener Ghoraguli, the band, performed in and around Kolkata and produced three albums until 1981 and then dissolved. In the late 1980s Subrata Ghosh a student of Presidency College, Kolkata, an ardent music lover, heard a song bhalo bashi jotsnay kash boney chhut tey and learned of Gautam Chattopadhyay. In a few days, Subrata reached Monida's residence at Naktala and after a few days of jamming with Subrata, the 2nd innings of Moheener Ghoraguli started. After months, they wanted to break the traditional tide of Bengali music started jamming in at Monida's small drawing room and sometimes they gathered at the Salt Lake BE Park at Salt Lake Welfare Association's tent to create innovative music. This was the time when the most revolutionizing compositions like "Prithibi", "Telephone", "Bangalee Korechoo" were created.

In the mid-1990s, a decade and a half after Moheener Ghoraguli's dissolution, Gautam Chattopadhyay decided to revive the movement of Moheener Ghoraguli. In 1994 Gautam was awarded from Kolkata Doordarshan to make a first ever Bengali Music Video with a budget. The budget was too little to make a quality product, so after the video songs got recorded and televised for the Doordarshan, Gautam decided to come out with an audio cassette with the support of Sourish and A. Mukherjee. The cassette album Abar Bochhor Kuri poray – compiled by Moheener Ghoraguli: Moheener Ghoraguli shompadita Bengali Gaan.

Abar Bochhor Kuri Porey ("Again, After Twenty Years", a quotation from Jibanananda Das), released at the Kolkata Book Fair. It included Gautam Chattopadhyay's own compositions, a few original Moheener Ghoraguli classics from the 1970s, as well as songs recorded by selected music makers of the 90s. Although listeners were initially slow to catch on, the album proved to be a hit, and it introduced the MG movement to a new generation of music-lovers. Gautam Chattopadhyay finally saw Moheener Ghoraguli music gaining the popularity and critical recognition that had eluded their band in the 1970s. Several other successful compilations have followed since the first one. Both in their native West Bengal and in Bangladesh, Moheener Ghoraguli is now a much-admired movement.

After returning from a location shooting of his last film Rong Bin, which was never completed, the next day he went to the Indropuri Studio to meet his longtime cinematographer friend and colleague, Vivek Banerjee and there he collapsed and died of a heart attack. An entire generation of old and new musicians who had been popularised by Gautam Kolkata mourned his untimely death and a tribute album "Moni Chara Shunno Laage" was released; Moni was not Gautam's nickname, but his siblings would call him Moni-da, moni, defining that he was the third of the brothers. His nickname was Manik.

== Meaning of the band's name ==
The literal meaning of Moheen'er Ghora-guli is "Moheen's horses". While this obscure phrase puzzles many of the band's fans, it is actually taken from a poem Ghora ('Horses') from the poetry book Shatti Tarar Timir (Bengali: সাতটি তারার তিমির) by the great modernist Bengali poet Jibanananda Das. The second line of the poem is:

"মহীনের ঘোড়াগুলো ঘাস খায় কার্তিকের জ্যোৎস্নার প্রান্তরে;"

loosely translated as:

"Moheen's horses graze on the horizon, in the Autumn moonlight"

One of the band's most popular songs, Bhalobashi Jyotsnay (Bengali: ভালোবাসি জ্যোৎস্নায়), is a tribute to the natural beauty of the Bengali countryside; the influence of Jibanananda's pastoral poetry is evident throughout the song.

There are other parallels: Jibanananda broke with the literary tradition of his time and introduced modernist themes and diction to Bengali poetry. He is often considered the first Bengali poet to truly break free of Rabindranath's imposing presence. To some extent, Moheener Ghoraguli attempted to do the same for Bengali popular music.

== Band members ==
Original line-up:

- Gautam Chattopadhyay (Manik a.k.a. Moni-da to his younger siblings) – voice, lead guitar, saxophone, folk instruments, lyrics
- Pradip Chatterjee (Bula Chattopadhyay)- bass guitar, flute
- Tapas Das – lyrics, voice, guitar
- Ranjon Ghoshal – lyrics, emcee, visuals, media relations
- Biswanath Bishu Chattopadhyay – drums, bass violin
- Abraham Mazumdar – piano, violin
- Tapesh Bandopadhyay (Bhanu) – voice, guitar,

(until 1978)

Later members:

- Raja Banerjee – (1978 onwards – voice, guitar)

After Tapesh Bandopadhyay left the band in 1978, he was replaced by Raja Banerjee. Raja went on to record the third Moheener Ghoraguli album Drishyomaan Moheener Ghoraguli with the band and performed in numerous concerts till the band was disbanded. For a brief period Pranab Sengupta and Christopher Vaz appeared with the band.

== Discography ==
=== Extended plays ===
List of extended plays
Title	Album details
Shangbigno Pakhikul O Kolkata Bishayak	Released: 1977; Label: Gathani; Formats: LP

=== Collaboration albums ===
List of collaboration albums
Title	Album details
Aabaar Bochhor Kuri Pore	Released: 1995; Label: Asha Audio; Formats: CD, cassette, digital download
Jhora Somoyer Gaan	Released: 1996; Label: Asha Audio; Formats: CD, cassette, digital download
Maya	Released: 1997; Label: Asha Audio; Formats: CD, cassette, digital download
Khyapar Gaan	Released: 1999; Label: Asha Audio; Formats: CD, cassette, digital download

=== Singles ===
List of singles
Title	Year	Album
"Ajaana UDonto bostu ba Aw-Oo-Baw"	1978	Ajaana UDonto bostu ba Aw-Oo-Baw
"Shudhijon Shono"	1978	Ajaana UDonto bostu ba Aw-Oo-Baw
"Ayee Surey Bohudurey"	1979	Drishyomaan Moheener Ghoraguli
"Chaitrer Kafan" (Je Gechhe Bonomajhe)	1979	Drishyomaan Moheener Ghoraguli

== Musicianship ==
=== Style ===
This group was formed by a group of Kolkata musicians led by Gautam Chattopadhyay towards the end of 1974. Initially, they called themselves 'Saptarshi', and finally settled on the name 'Moheener Ghoraguli' proposed by Ranjon Ghoshal. The name was borrowed from a poem 'Ghora' by Jibanananda Das.

In such a conservative climate, Moheener Ghoraguli, with its unorthodox musical compositions and strange choice of song themes, failed to gain much of a fan base. Its songs dealt with everyday topics—politics, poverty, injustice, revolution, love, loneliness, even begging and prostitution. Gautam Chattopadhyay had strong political beliefs; in common with many intelligent and idealistic young men of his generation, he was involved in socialist/communist politics during the 1960s and 1970s, and may have been involved in the Naxalite movement. This political outlook was reflected in the musical output of the band.

The type of music that Moheener Ghoraguli pioneered, though debatably, had the seeds of now very popular Jibonmukhi gaan or 'Songs of ordinary life'. Two decades after Moheen, singers like Kabir Suman, Nochiketa and Anjan Dutt took Jibonmukhi gaan to a new level of popularity, but the origins of the genre can be found in the songs of Moheener Ghoraguli.

The band recorded with Western and Bengali folk instruments and also experimented in a variety of musical styles, created baul-jazz, some of which must have jarred with the sensibilities of its audience. Today, these compositions sound quite contemporary, leading many to conclude that Moheener Ghoraguli was indeed ahead of its time. The band freely borrowed elements from baul shongeet, the folk music of rural Bengal. It can therefore lay claim to being the original Bengali folk-rock band. Many bands since Moheen have adopted similar innovations.

=== Live performances ===
The original Moheener Ghoraguli line-up performed consistently over the period 1976–1981 throughout the city of Kolkata. Some of their notable performances were at:

- Jogesh Mime Academy (1977 and 1978)
- Star Theater (1978)
- Max Mueller Bhavan (1979)
- Rabindra Sadan (1977 and 1979)
- St. Paul's Cathedral, Kolkata (1980)
- Kolkata International Jazz Festival (1980)
- Calcutta School of Music (1981)
- Tollygunge Club (1981)

Abar Bochhor Kuri Pore concert: All the new generation musicians who performed in the Aabaar Bochhor Kuri Pore album artists were given the opportunity to perform. While the singers and musicians were performing on the stage, at the backside, six huge canvas was kept and drawn by one of Bengal's most famous contemporary painters, depicted the meaning of the songs live on the canvas. The canvases were donated to Jadavpur University Student's Union with an autograph of Gautam and Rathin.

Gautam Chattopadhyay's last live performance was at Kalyani University in January 1999, along with Subrata Ghosh of Garer Math, Neel, Bonny & Dwide of the then Krosswindz.

=== Tribute concerts ===
- First Rock Concert - Remembering Moheener Ghoraguli, a concert held at Ambedkar Bhavan, Bangalore on 17 February 2007.
- Monfokira and Koushik (Prithibi) - Sangbigno Pakhikul & Nagar Sankirtan (2009). A tribute concert to Moheener Ghoraguli
- Abar Bochhor Tirish Pore, Moheener Ghoraguli, Concert at Nicco Park, Kolkata, 5 January 2008
- Tribute to Moheener Ghoraguli by Kolkata musicians 2010 at the Basement, Kolkata
- Bandwood Underground v.03 by News at Bengali Bands. Former Moheener Ghoraguli member Tapas, Subrata Ghosh and Joyjit Lahiri shared the same stage as a tribute to Gautam Chattopadhyay.
- Smarane Gautam: A musical tribute to Moheener Ghoraguli held on 25 December 2017
- Jhora Shomoyer Gaan - Smritir Molate Moheener Ghoraguli: A musical tribute to Moheener Ghoraguli held on 8 September 2019, organized by Kristy, A musical organization of Khulna University at Khulna University Campus.

=== Covers ===
Moheener Ghoraguli's music is covered by Subrata Ghosh (Gorer Math) and also by a number of Bengali artists including Fossils, Chandrabindoo, Bhoomi, Krosswindz, Lakkhichhara and Insomnia and Prithibi. Koushik of Prithibi with Monfokira has organised an experimental concert on Shottorer Sohortolir gaan, an unreleased album of Moheener Ghoraguli, with the aim of taking their music forward.

In 2006, the original Moheener Ghoraguli song Prithibi ta naki chhoto hote hote was remade as Bheegi Bheegi by the music-director Pritam Chakraborty for the Hindi film Gangster which received commercial success. The song was also sung by Bangladeshi singer James of Nagar Baul fame. On 9 January 2001 and 2002, Jadavpur University AISA organised "Dariyay Ailo Tufan" where all the contemporary Bengali bands performed in memory of Gautam Chattopadhyay.

== See also ==
- Bengali band music
