= Pradip Chatterjee =

Indian musician (born 1950)

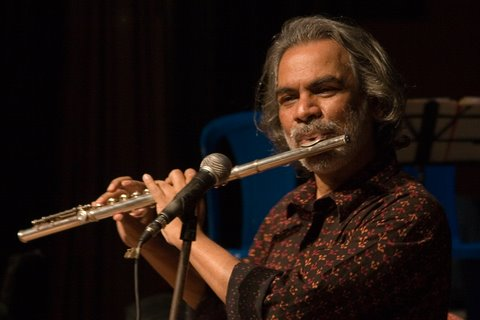
- Born: 15 December 1950 (age 75); Kolkata, West Bengal, India

Pradip Chatterjee (born 15 December 1950) is a founder member of the Bengali band Moheener Ghoraguli. He is the younger brother of Gautam Chatterjee. He was also a theatre person, filmmaker and ethnographer.

Also known as Bula, Chatterjee is a flautist and vocalist.

== Career ==
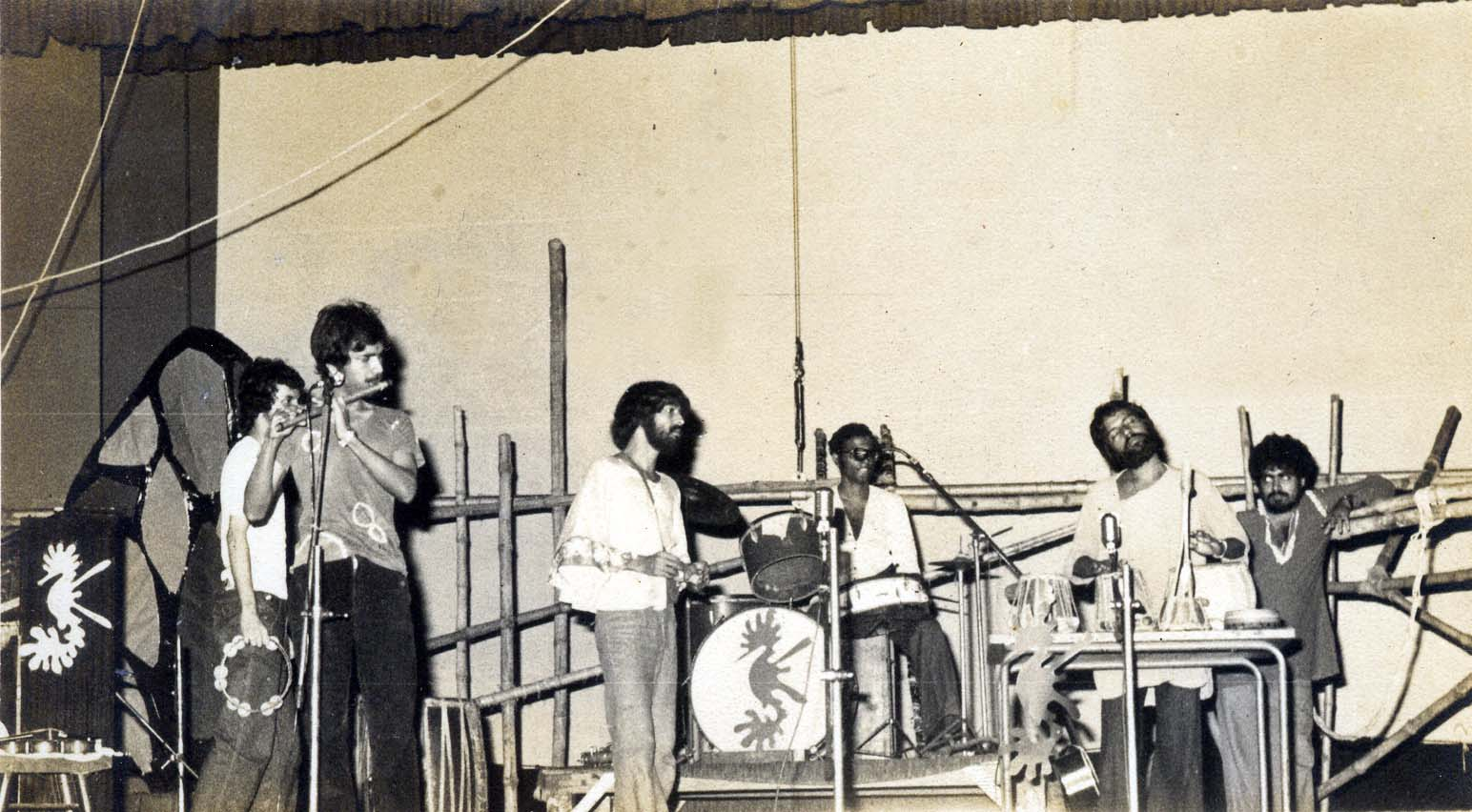
Moheener Ghoraguli in concert at Rabindra Sadan, 1979, left to right: Raja Banerjee, Pradip Chatterjee, Tapas Das, Pranab Sengupta, Gautam Chattopadhyay and Ranjon Ghoshal.

An engineering graduate from the Indian Institute of Engineering Science and Technology, Shibpur, which was then affiliated with the University of Calcutta, he joined the Calcutta engineering firm M.N. Dastur & Company (P) Ltd, after the break-up of Moheener Ghoraguli.

He resides in Kolkata, with his wife Sharmistha, daughter Anka and son Ritoban.

== Discography ==
=== Moheener Ghoraguli albums ===
- Shangbigno Pakhikul O Kolkata Bishayak (1977)
- Ajaana UDonto bostu ba Aw-Oo-Baw (1978)
- Drishyomaan Moheener Ghoraguli (1979)
