= Obscure (band) =

Rock band from Bangladesh

Obscure অবসকিউর
- Origin: Khulna, Bangladesh
- Genres: Rock, Pop rock
- Years active: 1985–present
- Labels: G-Series, Soundtek, Sangeeta
- Members: Sayed Hasan Tipu; Sheikh Abir; MD Arifur Rahman Shanto; Binod Roy Das; Rabbani Mir Rabbi
- Past members: Azam Babu; Sohel Aziz; Tanim; Shamim; Raajue Sheikh; Tushar; John Bala; Tutul; Masud; Sohel Alam Chowdhury; Ahsan; Shumon Patwary; Liton D Costa; Richard; Mehdi; Rabbani; Christofer Prince Gomes
- Website: obscurebd.com

Obscure is a Bangladeshi pop and rock music band from Khulna formed by Sayed Hasan Tipu on 15 March 1985.

== History ==
Sayed Hasan Tipu established the band on 18 March 1985. He is the founder and main vocalist of the band. The first Album Obscure Vol. 1 was released in 1986 and second album Obscure Vol.2 was released in 1987.

== Discography ==
- Obscure – Vol 1 – 1986
- Obscure – Vol 2 – 1988
- Swopnocharini - 1990
- Ferate Tomay – 2001
- Obscure Unplugged – 2006
- Opekkhay Theko – 2007
- Ichcher Daka Daki – 2009
- Fera - 2013
- Obscure O Bangladesh – 2014
- Majhrate Chad – 2015
- Crack Platoon – 2016
- Stop Genocide – 2017
- Titor Shadhinota - 2019

== Band members ==
=== Current members ===
- Sayed Hasan Tipu – Vocal, Founder of Band (1985–present)
- Sheikh Abir – Guitars, backing vocals, (2018–present)
- MD Arifur Rahman Shanto – Guitars, backing vocals (2014–present)
- Binod Roy Das – Keyboard (2008–present)
- Wahidul Mamun Apu – Keyboard, backing vocals (2018–present)
- Tanvirul Islam Zibon – Drums (2019–present)
- Nadim – Bass (2020–present)

Guest member

- Shawan Mahmud - Vocals

=== Former members ===
- Azam Babu – Drums (1985-)
- Sohel Aziz – Keys (1985-)
- Tanim – Bass
- Shamim – Drums
- Tushar – Guitars (1985–)
- John Bala – Guitars
- Tutul - Guitars
- Masud – Bass
- Sohel Alam Chowdhury – Lyricist
- Ahsan – Lyricist
- Shumon Patwary – Guitars
- Liton D Costa – Drums
- Richard – Guitars
- Mehdi – Guitars
- Raajue Sheikh - Bass
- Christofer Prince Gomes - Bass
- Rabbani Mir Rabbi – Drums

=== Obscure first line-up ===
- Tipu – Vocals
- Azam Babu – Drums
- Sohel Aziz – Keys
- Tushar – Guitars
- John Bala – Guitars
- Tutul - Guitars
- Masud – Bass
- Sohel Alam Chowdhury – Lyricist
- Ahsan – Lyricist
