= Joler Gaan =

Independent folk band from Dhaka

Joler Gaan জলের গান
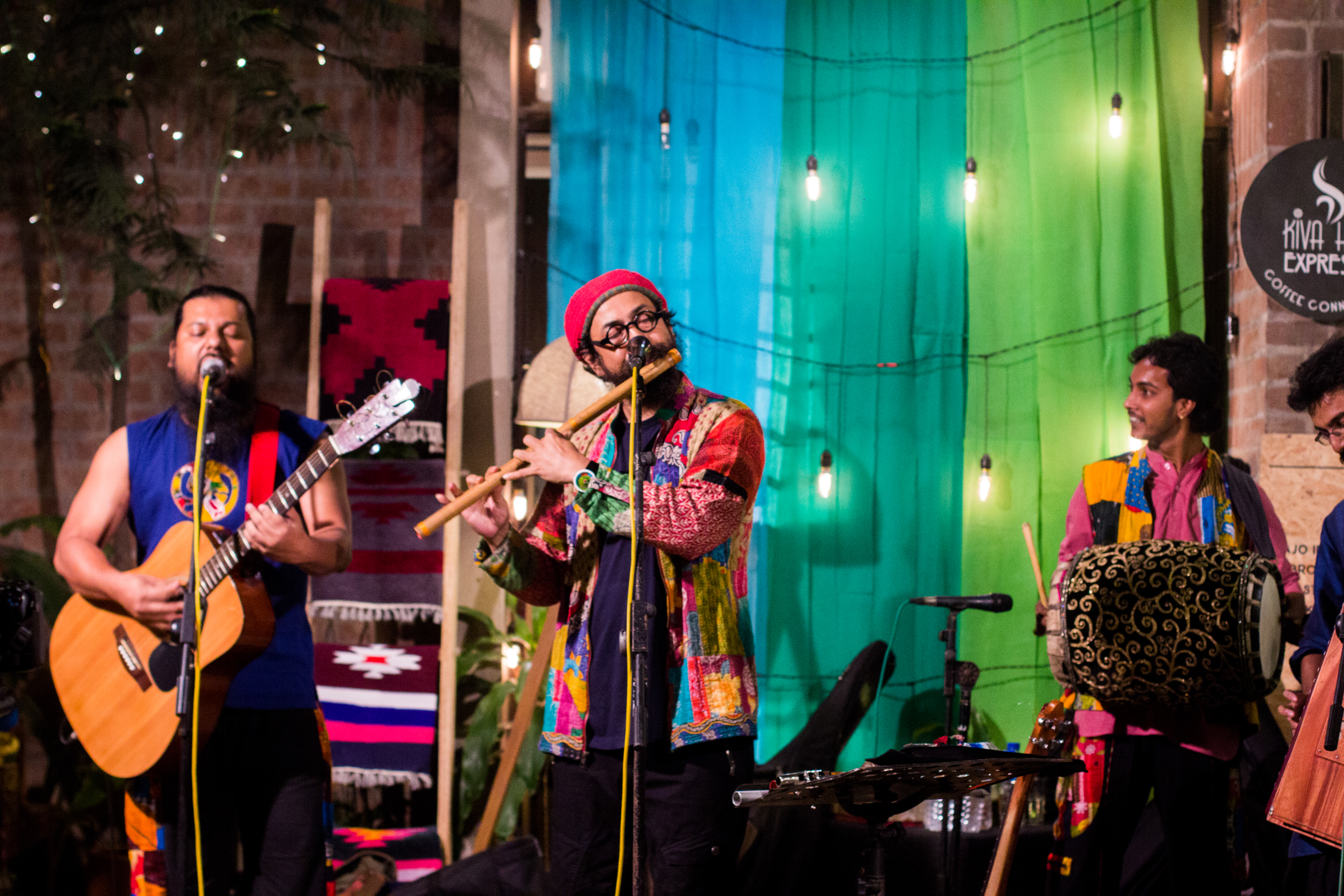

Background information
- Origin: Dhaka, Bangladesh
- Genres: Folk, Indie folk
- Years active: 2006–present
- Members: Rahul Ananda; Kanak Aditya; ABS Xem; Mallik Ayushshairja; Rana Sarwar; MD Masum; Gopi Debnath; Dip Roy; DH Shuvo; Sutradhar Arjun
- Past members: Al Fahmi Kazi Bashar Kartik; Parijat Moumon; Sanjay Kumar Saha; Md. Shariful Islam; Shyamal Karmakar; Fazlul Kader Chowdhury Mithu; Sheuly Bhattarcharjee; Aseer Arman; Saiful Jarnal
- Website: jolergaan.com

Joler Gaan (English: Song of Water) is an independent folk band from Dhaka, Bangladesh formed in 2006.

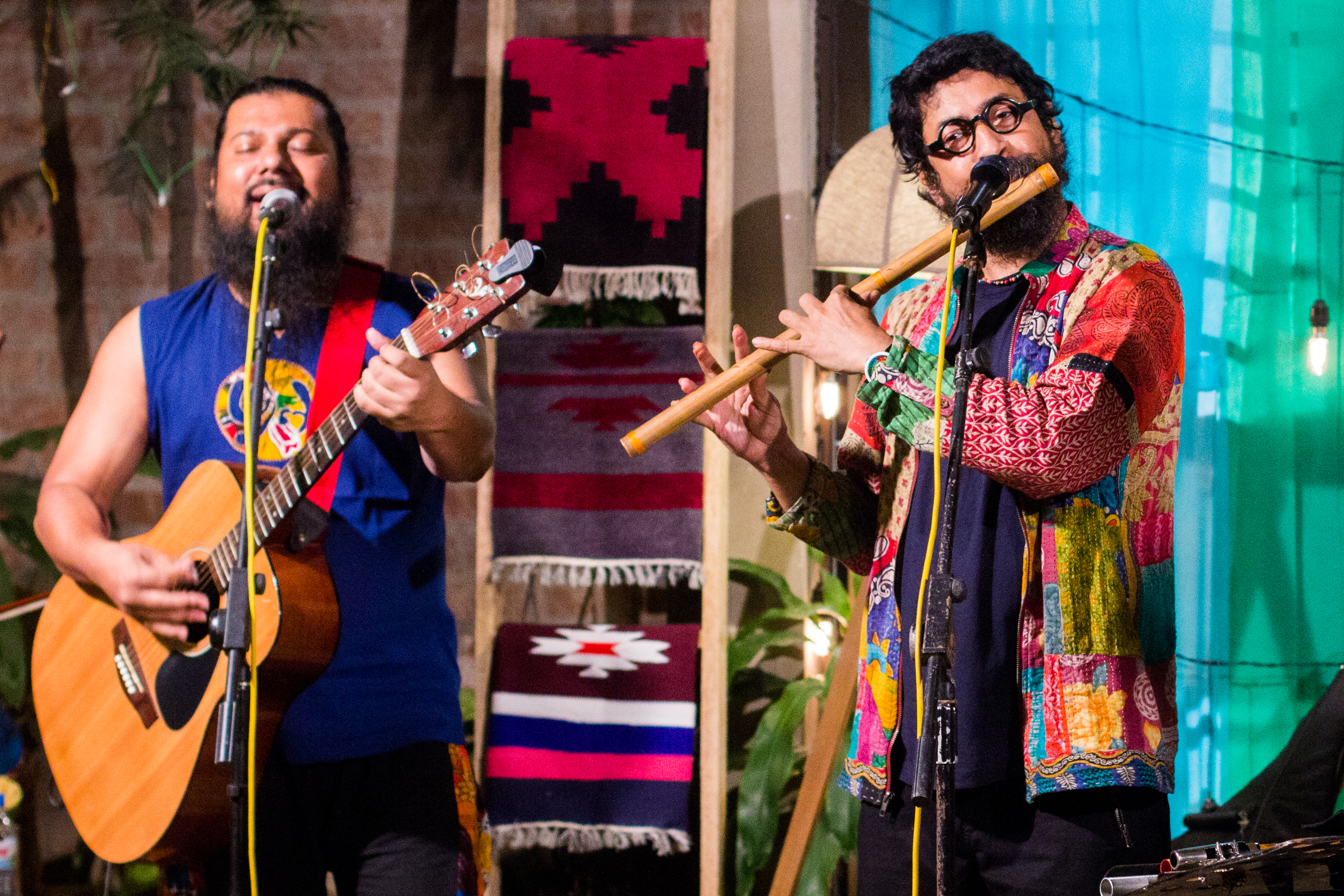
Joler Gaan is performing in MIB Spirit, Dhanmondi

== Name ==
The term "Joler Gaan" consists of two Bengali words which reflect ideals of the band. "Jol" means water and "Gaan" means music or song in Bengali. Together they mean "Music of Water".

== Style ==
The lyrics are based on human stories. Few lyrics are collected from various sources. Some songs are especially written. Joler Gaan makes new instruments and sometimes customizes foreign ones. The instruments of Joler Gaan are usually portable, and do not require electric wires and jacks.

== Discography ==
- Otol Joler Gaan (12 April 2013)
- Patalpurer Gaan (1 June 2014)
- Noyon Joler Gaan (27 October 2019)

== Members ==
=== Current members ===
- Rahul Ananda – lyricist, composer, vocalist, flutes, clarinet and mandola
- Mollik Oishorjo - vocalist, harmonium
- Gopi Devnath – violin
- Rana sarwar – cajon, percussion, guitar, piano
- ABS Xem – vocalist, guitar
- Md Masum – dhol, percussion
- Dip Roy – double bass, pagli, podma totaban
- DH Shuvo - sound engineer

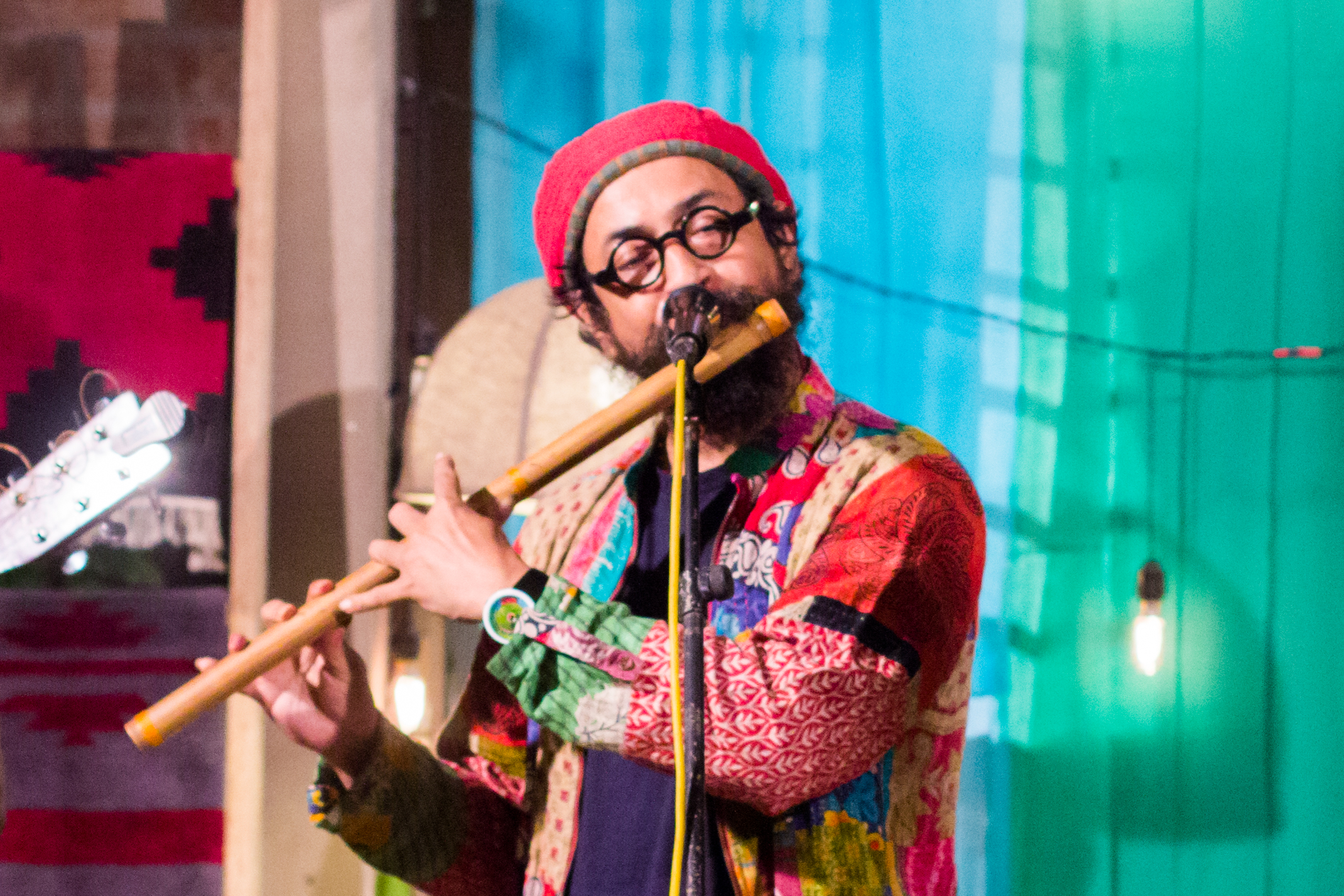
Rahul Ananda is playing flutes in MIB Spirit.

=== Past members ===
- Kanak Adittya
- Shyamol Karmaker
- Saiful Jurnal
- Aseer Arman
- Sheuli Bhattacharjee
- Al Fahmi Kazi Bashar Kartik
- Parijat Moumon
- Sanjay Kumar Saha
- Shariful Islam
- Fazlul Kader Chowdhury Mithu

== Notable performances ==
In 2006, the band participated in the World Sufi Festival, Glasgow, Scotland. Joler Gaan also performed around Scotland. They played mystical spiritual songs of Old Masters. Joler Gaan performed in the National Museum of Scotland in Edinburgh.

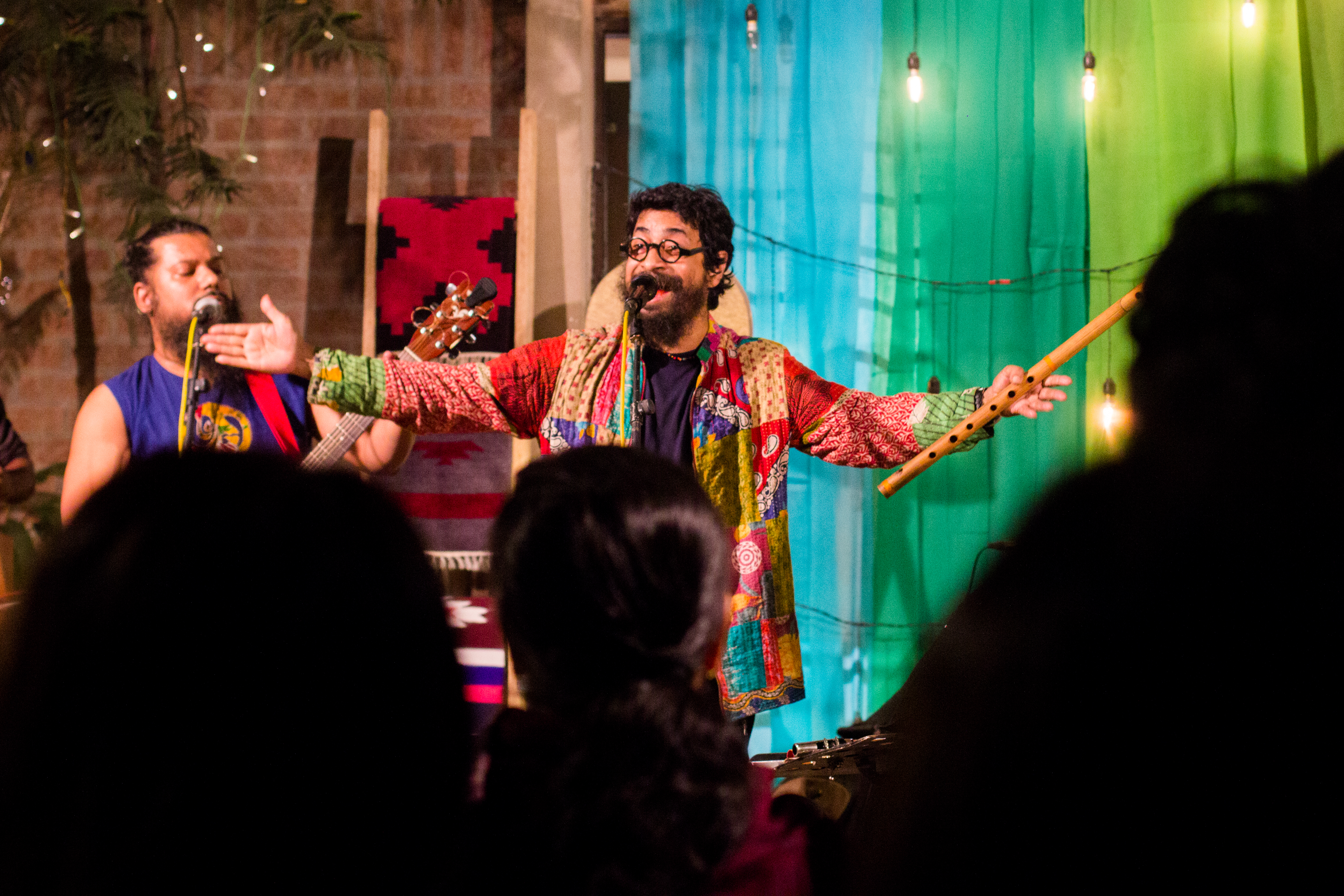
Rahul Ananda is performing in MIB Spirit Concert
