= Shonar Bangla Circus =

Bangladeshi psychedelic rock band

- Origin: Dhaka, Bangladesh
- Genres: rock, Psychedelic rock
- Members: Probar Ripon — (vocalist and guitarist); Saad Chowdhury — (keyboard); Shakil Haque — (bass guitar); Seth Panduranga Bloomberg — (guitarist); Hasin Arian — (drummer)
- Past members: Dewan Enamul Hasan Raju — (drummer)

Shonar Bangla Circus is a five-member Bangladeshi psychedelic rock band known for its eclectic and boundary-defying musical style. The band does not confine its music within any single genre; their released works incorporate elements of rock, blues, folk, jazz, and metal.

The band was formed in 2018 in Dhaka. About a year and a half after its formation, they released their debut album Hyena Express on YouTube in 2020. The album later gained recognition for its conceptual and experimental approach, and introducing a new sound in Bangladeshi rock.

The band's founder, lyricist, rhythm guitarist, and vocalist Probor Ripon named the group after a circus troupe he encountered during his childhood.

Shonar Bangla Circus has gained popularity through live performances across Bangladesh. Their popularity has also extended beyond Bangladesh, reaching audiences in Kolkata, India.

On January 8, 2026, the band released their double album Mahashmashan on streaming platforms. The album consists of 17 tracks and has been described as a conceptual continuation of Hyena Express.

== History ==
Shonar Bangla Circus was formed in May 2018 with five members. The band initially planned to announce their debut album through a concert at the TSC grounds of University of Dhaka, but this was disrupted due to the COVID-19 pandemic.

In February 2020, the band announced their debut album Hyena Express, releasing the title track on February 29 via YouTube. On November 24, 2021, they held their first solo concert at the TSC of the University of Dhaka.

== Discography ==
- "হায়েনা এক্সপ্রেস (Hyena Express)" (2020)
- "মহাশ্মশান (Mohashoshan/Necropolis)" (2026) (A Double-album)

=== Albums ===
==== Hyena Express (2020) ====
All lyrics are written by Probor Ripon.

No.	Title	Length
1.	"Hyena Express"	6:20
2.	"Mrittu Utpadon Karkhana (Death Production Factory)"	9:07
3.	"Ondho Deyal (Blind Wall)"	5:38
4.	"Shurjer Ondhokar (Darkness of the Sun)"	6:57
5.	"Amar Naam Oshukh (My Name is Disease)"	6:39
6.	"Kromosho (Gradually)"	5:59
7.	"Perfume er Fele Dewa Botol (Discarded Perfume Bottle)"	5:01
8.	"Attohottar Gaan (Suicide Song)"	6:10
9.	"Epitaph"	6:44
Total length:		58:58

==== Mahashmashan (2026) ====
No.	Title	Length
1.	"Punorutthan (Resurrection)"	0:32
2.	"Aguner Ponkhiraj (Fire Pegasus)"	6:00
3.	"Nihshongota (Loneliness)"	6:38
4.	"Byertho Manush (Failed Human)"	8:04
5.	"Esho Prem (Come, Love)"	5:27
6.	"Noroke Brishti (Rain in Hell)"	5:35
7.	"Shomokal Kirton (Contemporary Hymn)"	6:05
8.	"Duburi (Diver)"	7:05
9.	"Ondho Moth (Blind Monastery)"	9:54
10.	"Mohashoshan (Necropolis)"	5:42
11.	"Rajhaash (Goose)"	7:53
12.	"Ondho Shohor (Blind City)"	6:55
13.	"Premagneyogiri (Love Volcano)"	9:00
14.	"Nekre (Wolf)"	6:24
15.	"Bod Obbhash (Bad Habit)"	4:30
16.	"Ondho Buror Blues (Blind Old Man’s Blues)"	9:33
17.	"Prem O Shokun (Love and the Vulture)"	6:49
Total length:		1:56:32
