= Bengali band music =

Modern Bengali music genre

Bengali Band Music
- Native name: বাংলা ব্যান্ড
- Stylistic origins: Classical music, Rock and roll, electric blues, folk music, country, blues
- Cultural origins: 1960s; Bangladesh; 1970s; West Bengal (India)
- Typical instruments: Vocals, electric guitar, bass guitar, drums, synthesizer, keyboards

Regional scenes
- Bengal

Bengali band music is a form of modern music performed in the Bengali language that incorporates elements of Western rock, pop, jazz, and folk music. The genre emerged during the 1960s in Bangladesh (then-East Pakistan) and 1970s in West Bengal, and later developed into a significant component of Bengali popular music. In Dhaka, the band Iolites, formed around St. Gregory's High School and College in 1963, is widely regarded as the first band in the history of Bengali band music. However, Uccharon, Spondan, and Souls (formed under the name Shurela) were established in Bangladesh in 1972 and were among the first bands to be formed exclusively around Bengali-language songs. In 1975, India's first Bengali band, Moheener Ghoraguli, was formed under the leadership of Gautam Chattopadhyay. Over time, the genre gradually gained popularity among the youth of both Bengals and began reflecting various social, cultural, and political realities. In the 21st century, its reach expanded further through digital platforms and online media.

== History ==
=== Early development and institutional foundations ===
The early development of band music in Bangladesh is closely associated with St. Gregory's High School and College in Dhaka. Founded in 1882 by the Belgian Benedictine missionary Gregory De Groote, the institution was regarded as one of the leading centres of Western education and cultural practice in contemporary Dhaka. Its comparatively liberal cultural environment played a role in promoting Western musical traditions, which later influenced the growth of band music in the region.

On 18 March 1963, during a cultural programme at the school, a guitar performance by Anglo-Indian student Telfar Johnson attracted the interest of young students. According to various sources, he performed popular songs by the British band The Shadows. Inspired by the performance, Fazle Robe became interested in learning the guitar and engaging in group-based musical practice. At the same time, rock and roll and beat music were rapidly gaining popularity worldwide. In 1963, the British band The Beatles released their debut studio album Please Please Me, which marked the emergence of a new trend in global popular music. Researchers note that the influence of these international musical developments gradually began to resonate among the educated youth of Dhaka during that period.

==== Formation of Iolites and early activities ====
Fazle Robe took the initiative to form a band after acquiring an electric guitar and amplifier. In 1964, guitarist Rafiq Mazhar Islam Saju joined him, followed later by Sufi Rashid. The group eventually developed a complete lineup when Sabbir Qader, a member of the Nawab family, joined with a drum set. In the same year, they officially established the band under the name Iolites. Later, Alamgir Haq joined as the lead vocalist, and his vocal style played a significant role in increasing the band's popularity. During its early years, Iolites faced various social and cultural obstacles. At the time, Western-style band music was regarded by sections of society as a form of “cultural degradation”. Nevertheless, the band continued performing at various schools, colleges, and social events across Dhaka.

After the launch of the Dhaka centre of Pakistan Television in 1965, Iolites performed an instrumental music programme there. According to various sources, it was one of the earliest band performances broadcast on television in then-East Pakistan. The programme is said to have been aired under the supervision of producer Hadi.

In 1967, the band changed its name to The Windy Side of Care. The group subsequently gained considerable popularity among urban youth in then-East Pakistan. According to various sources, they organised a ticketed concert at the Engineering Institute in Dhaka, which is regarded as one of the earliest commercial band concerts held in East Pakistan prior to independence. Contemporary accounts suggest that the band's remuneration and popularity were significant indicators of the growing spread of urban modern music culture during that period.

==== Contemporary bands and social expansion ====
Alongside the growth of band culture centred in Dhaka during the 1960s, modern musical trends also began to develop in other cities, including Chittagong and Narayanganj. In 1963, Chittagong College student Safat Ali formed the group Jinga Shilpi Goshti with members of his family. Although the group was primarily associated with orchestral music practice, it contributed to the spread of modern music through performances of contemporary popular and Western-influenced songs. Around the same period, Jalal Abedin formed a group named Bakalam in Narayanganj. Various sources also mention the emergence of bands such as Lightenings in Chittagong and Time Ago Emotion, led by Robin.

Elite hotels and social clubs in then-East Pakistan played an important role in the development of band music during this period. In particular, cultural events held at Hotel InterContinental Dhaka, Dhaka Club, and Shahbagh Hotel became recognised venues for Western-style musical performances. Guitar, drums, and other modern instrument-based performances gained popularity among the urban educated class. Although most bands of the time mainly performed English songs and instrumental music, these practices later laid the foundation for the development of Bengali-language band music.

==== Liberation War and the transformation of band music ====
The 1969 mass uprising and the 1971 Bangladesh Liberation War had a significant impact on the country's cultural sphere. In the post-war period, themes of patriotism, social reality, and wartime experiences began to be reflected more prominently in music, literature, and theatre. These changes also influenced band music. Many musicians were directly involved in the Liberation War, and their wartime experiences later became reflected in the themes and presentation of their music.

One of the most influential figures of this movement was Azam Khan, who became widely known as the Pop Samrat (“King of Pop”). During the Liberation War, he reportedly participated as a guerrilla fighter under Sector 2 and was associated with the Crack Platoon. After independence, he formed the band Uchcharon in 1972. Azam Khan’s music combined elements of Western rock and roll with the social realities and urban experiences of Bangladesh. His lyrics reflected the lives of working-class people, poverty, social inequality, and the spirit of the Liberation War. Songs such as Rail Liner Oi Bostite, Alal O Dulal, and Ore Saleka Ore Maleka gained widespread popularity among the youth of the time and brought Bengali band music into closer connection with the experiences of ordinary people.

==== Spondan and the modernisation of folk music ====
In the post-Liberation War period, various new trends began to emerge in Bengali band music. On 17 January 1972, the band Spondan was founded under the leadership of Nasir Ahmed Apu. The band became known for presenting Bengali folk music through a fusion with modern Western musical instruments. This approach contributed to the development of a distinct folk- and pop-oriented trend within Bengali band music. Several artists, including Firoz Sai, Ferdous Wahid, and Pilu Momtaz, were associated with Spondan. Their performances, which combined folk melodies, modern musical arrangements, and Western instrumentation, gained considerable popularity. The song Emon Ekta Ma De Na is regarded as one of the band's most notable performances. From this period onward, the use of drums, electric guitars, bass guitars, and keyboards became more systematically integrated into Bengali band music. As a result, a strong framework for band-oriented musical arrangements developed within Bengali modern music, profoundly influencing musical trends in the following decades.

=== Development of Bengali band music in West Bengal ===
During the 1970s, Bengali music in West Bengal remained largely dependent on film-based modern songs. In this context, Moheener Ghoraguli was formed in 1975 as part of an alternative musical movement. The band was founded by Gautam Chattopadhyay. Its name was inspired by a line from a poem by Jibanananda Das. Moheener Ghoraguli sought to introduce a new musical style in the Bengali language through a fusion of rock, jazz, folk music, and songs centred on urban life. Alongside Western musical instruments, their music also incorporated influences from Baul and Bengali folk traditions. Members of the band occasionally described this hybrid musical style as “Baul jazz”. Compared to mainstream Bengali music of the time, the band’s lyrics and musical arrangements were distinctly unconventional. Their songs reflected urban life, social transformation, personal emotions, and political realities. Although the band did not achieve major commercial success during its early years, it was later recognised as one of the most influential and pioneering bands in the history of Bengali band music.

==== Themes and influence of Moheener Ghoraguli ====
Gautam Chattopadhyay was known as a politically and socially conscious artist, and his outlook was reflected in the lyrics and musical style of Moheener Ghoraguli. The band’s songs emphasised themes such as the crises of urban life, social inequality, political instability, and personal alienation. The band’s albums Shangbigno Pakhikul O Kolkata Bishayak (1977) and Ajaana UDonto bostu ba Aw-Oo-Baw (1978) reflected the contemporary social and political realities of Kolkata. Their music incorporated folk, rock, and jazz influences alongside experimental musical arrangements, making it distinctly different from mainstream Bengali popular music of the time. During its early years, the band failed to achieve widespread popularity among mainstream audiences, and its alternative style was often regarded as unconventional. However, in the 1990s, songs such as Tomay Dilam and Hay Bhalobashi regained popularity among a new generation of listeners. As a result, Moheener Ghoraguli came to be reassessed as one of the most influential and pioneering bands in the history of Bengali band music.

=== 1980s: Commercial popularity and the expansion of rock music ===
During the 1980s, Bengali band music in Bangladesh developed a more organised commercial foundation. In this period, various bands gained widespread popularity through album releases, television performances, and stage concerts. Bands such as Souls, Miles, and Feedback played important roles in the growth of Bangladeshi band music. The Chittagong-based band Souls, which was initially known as Surela, is regarded as one of the most influential bands in Bengali band music. At different times, artists such as Nakib Khan, Tapan Chowdhury, Kumar Bishwajit, and Ayub Bachchu were associated with the band. Their contributions had a significant impact on the development of Bengali band music.

Meanwhile, Miles, formed in 1979, initially performed songs in English but later achieved widespread popularity through Bengali pop and rock music. Following the release of the band’s debut album, the 1991 album Protishruti received particular attention. Miles’ music, characterised by Western-influenced melodies, modern musical arrangements, and guitar-driven compositions, created a new appeal among young listeners.

==== Development of heavy metal ====
During the mid-1980s, heavy metal and hard rock music began to emerge within the Bangladeshi band music scene. Warfaze played a significant role in the rise of this genre. Formed in Dhaka in 1984, the band gained a distinct identity through fast-paced guitar riffs, extended guitar solos, and high-intensity vocal performances. The performances of Ibrahim Ahmed Kamal and Sanjoy received particular attention. In later years, Warfaze came to be recognised as one of the most influential bands in the history of Bangladeshi heavy metal music. At the same time, bands such as Rockstrata, In Dhaka, and Aces also became active in Dhaka’s underground music scene. In various musical discussions, these bands are regarded as important representatives of the early heavy metal movement in Bangladesh. Beyond music, the bands of this era also contributed to the development of a distinct youth culture. Long hair, black clothing, and the influence of Western metal culture became popular among sections of urban youth. As a result, new musical trends, subcultures, and audience communities emerged within Bengali band music.

=== 1990s: The golden age of Bengali band music ===
The 1990s are regarded as a significant and influential period in the history of Bengali band music. During this decade, band music achieved widespread commercial success and expanded to a large audience in both Bangladesh and West Bengal. The growth of the audio cassette industry, television programmes, and large-scale concerts played important roles in increasing the popularity of Bengali band music. In Bangladesh, LRB (Love Runs Blind) and Nagar Baul emerged as two of the most popular bands of the era. Under the leadership of Ayub Bachchu, LRB became particularly known for its hard rock, blues rock, and guitar-driven music. The band’s songs and stage performances gained widespread popularity among young audiences. Meanwhile, Feelings, led by James and later known as Nagar Baul, developed a distinctive style within Bengali rock music. The band’s music incorporated influences from rock, psychedelic rock, and folk traditions. James’ distinctive vocal style and lyric-oriented performances established him as one of the most popular artists in Bengali band music.'

=== The “Bangla Band” movement in West Bengal ===
During the mid-1990s, Bengali band music experienced renewed popularity in West Bengal. In this period, a new cultural trend centred on alternative Bengali rock music emerged in Kolkata, which later became known as the “Bangla Band” movement. Following the release of Gautam Chattopadhyay’s album Aabaar Bochhor Kuri Pore in 1995, interest in alternative Bengali rock music grew among a new generation of artists. During this time, Cactus, Fossils, and Chandrabindoo emerged as some of the leading representatives of Bengali band music in Kolkata. Cactus became known for its fusion of rock, blues, and psychedelic music. The band’s song Holud Pakhi gained particular popularity and is regarded as one of the notable songs in Bengali rock music.

Meanwhile, Fossils, led by Rupam Islam, achieved widespread popularity among young audiences in the late 1990s. The band’s songs emphasised themes of personal emotion, social crisis, and existentialism. Fossils’ stage performances and Rupam Islam’s lyric-centred presentation introduced a new dimension to Bengali rock music in West Bengal.

==== Influence of Jibonmukhi songs ====
During the 1990s, a musical genre known as Jibonmukhi Gaan (“songs about life”) gained popularity in West Bengal. Songs in this genre focused on personal experiences, the realities of urban life, social crises, and contemporary social consciousness. Kabir Suman, Nachiketa Chakraborty, and Anjan Dutt are regarded as some of the principal artists associated with this movement. However, Kabir Suman preferred to describe his music simply as modern Bengali songs rather than using the label “Jibonmukhi”. The realistic lyrics and social awareness of this musical trend had a significant influence on later Bengali band music. In particular, lyric-centred presentations dealing with urban life, personal struggles, and social observation became increasingly important in Bengali rock and alternative band music. The music of Anjan Dutt also reflected influences from blues, folk, and country music. His songs, which centred on the experiences and culture of Kolkata’s middle-class urban life, gained particular popularity among city audiences.

=== Modern era: Digital platforms and new trends ===
At the beginning of the 21st century, the expansion of digital technology brought significant changes to the promotion and commercial structure of Bengali band music. Following the decline of the cassette- and compact disc-based market, the music industry faced a new reality. The later rise of online streaming platforms, social media, and video-based media created new opportunities for independent and alternative artists. In Bangladesh, bands such as Chirkutt, Shironamhin, Meghdol, and Sonar Bangla Circus introduced new trends to contemporary Bengali band music. Their songs incorporated alternative rock, folk influences, experimental sounds, and poetic lyricism, which gained popularity among younger audiences.

In 2022, Coke Studio Bangla introduced a renewed interest in the fusion of Bengali folk music and modern musical arrangements. Under the musical direction of Shayan Chowdhury Arnob, the platform presented various folk and indigenous musical traditions through contemporary instrumentation and modern arrangements. Songs such as “Nasek Nasek” and “Murir Tin” gained particular popularity. According to critics and music analysts, the initiative played a role in increasing the younger generation’s interest in Bengali folk music.

== Prominent Figures ==
- Ayub Bachchu
- Azam Khan
- Faruq Mahfuz Anam James
- Gautam Chattopadhyay
- Naquib Khan
- Tapan Chowdhury

== Band List ==
=== Bangladeshi Bengali Bands ===
Band Name	Founded
Iolits	1963
Zinga	1963
Uccharon	1972
Spondan (formed under the name Shurela)	1972
Souls	1972
Winning	1983
Feedback	1976
Renaissance	1985
Miles	1979
Chime	1983
Warfaze	1984
Rockstrata	1985
Obscure	1986
LRB (Love Runs Blind)	1991
Ark	1991
Cryptic Fate	1993
Shironamhin	1996
Dalchhut	1996
Nagar Baul	1997
Artcell	1999
Nemesis	1999
Bangla	1999
Maqsood O' Dhaka	1999
Aurthohin	1998
Odd Signature	2001
Black	2001
Meghdol	2001
Arbovirus	2002
Chirkutt	2002
Avash	2005
Joler Gaan	2006
Shohortoli	2006
Shunno	2007
Adverb	2008
Ashes	2010
Bay of Bengal	2014
Sonar Bangla Circus	2015
Uchcharon	—
Highway	—
Ongsho	—
Mechanics	—
Lalon Band	—
Prometheus	—
Pentagon	—
Vikings	—
Conclusion	—
Krishnopokkho	—
Muktanchal	—
Vibe	—
Monosoroni	—
Encore	—
Shohojia	—
Oblig	—
Recall	—
Subconscious	—
Aftermath	—
The Trap	—
Old School	—

=== Indian Bengali Bands ===
Band Name	Founded
Moheener Ghoraguli	1975
Crosswinds	1978
Chandrabindoo	1989
Parash Pathar	1991
Cactus	1992
Fossils	1998
Dohar	1999
Bhoomi	1999
Prithibi	2005
Shohor	—
Friends	—
Kaya	—
Eklabya	—
Kolkata Blues	—
Neon	—
Kalpurush	—
Bisher Doshok	2017-present

== See also ==
- Bangladeshi rock
