= Abraham Mazumdar =

Abraham Mazumder
- Origin: Kolkata, India
- Genres: Classical, Bengali
- Occupations: Music instructor Conductor
- Instrument: Violin; Viola; Piano
- Years active: 1984–present

Abraham Mazumder is an Indian conductor and violinist. He is a former member of the Bengali band Moheener Ghoraguli and has been active in Kolkata's western classical music world since the 1980s.

== Career ==
Abraham Mazumder started learning music in the 1970s under the guidance of Father Theodore Mathieson. He earned ATCL and LTCL degrees in violin.

Mazumder began teaching music at Calcutta Boys' School in 1974. In early 1976, he met Goutam Chattopadhyay and became closely associated with his music. Later on he became the youngest member of the band Moheener Ghoraguli. He continued playing with the band until it broke up around 1982.

Since 1983, Mazumder has taught music at La Martiniere for Boys. He formed his own orchestra at the premises of Alliance Francaise de Calcutta (Park Mansion), L'Atelier de Musique in 1983.

Now, he has even opened his own music academy called the Abraham Mazumdar Academy in which many kinds of instruments will be taught to students. Instruments include, the violin, piano, guitar, and trumpet. Singing is also taught here.

== Discography ==
- Shangbigno Pakhikul O Kolkata Bishayak (1977)
