= Gautam Chattopadhyay =

Indian musician

- Gautam Chattopadhyay, the founder of Moheener Ghoraguli

Background information
- Born: Gautam Chattopadhyay; 1 June 1949; India
- Died: 20 June 1999 (aged 50) Kolkata, India
- Genre: Bangla folk rock
- Occupations: Musician, singer, music programmer
- Instruments: Vocals, guitar, saxophone
- Years active: 1960s–1999
- Formerly of: Moheener Ghoraguli

Gautam Chattopadhyay (Bengali: গৌতম চট্টোপাধ্যায়) was an Indian Bengali singer, songwriter, guitarist, and composer. In 1975, as a leader he founded the progressive rock band Moheener Ghoraguli with Tapas Das, Abraham Mazumdar, Pradip Chatterjee, Ranjon Ghoshal, Biswanath Bishu Chattopadhyay, Tapesh Bandopadhyay. He was also a theatre personality, filmmaker, and ethnographer.

He played many Indian and Western instruments. During his college years he played lead guitar in a band called The Urge, whose members were mostly Anglo Indians, in pubs including Trincas and Moulin Rouge at Park Street of Kolkata during the 1960s.

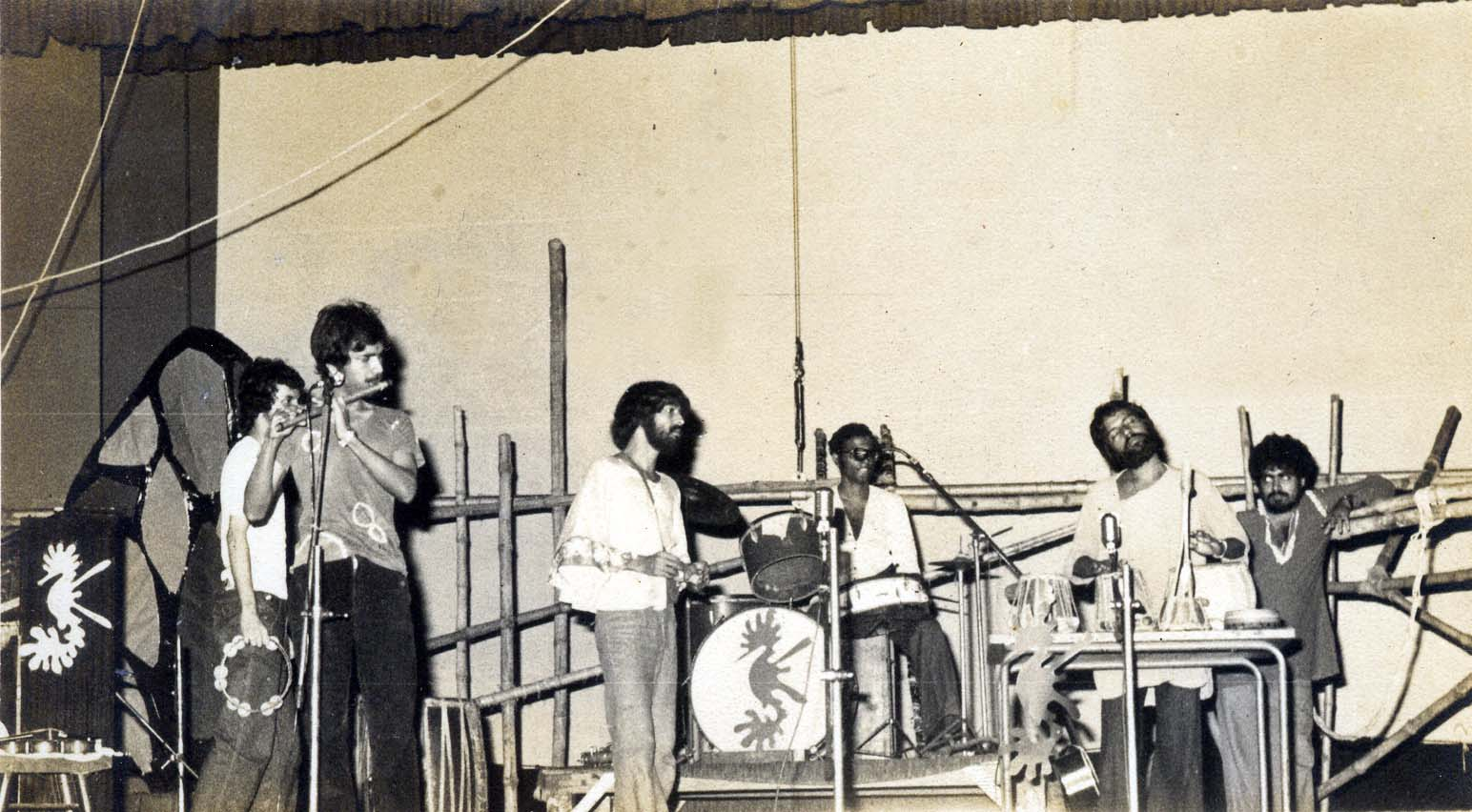
Moheener Ghoraguli in concert at Rabindra Sadan, 1979. Left to right: Raja Banerjee, Pradip Chattopadhyay, Tapas Das, Pranab Sengupta, Gautam Chattopadhyay and Ranjon Ghoshal.

While a student at the Presidency College in Kolkata, he participated in the political movement of the late 60s and early 70s in Bengali campuses known as the Naxal Movement. He then moved to Jabalpur, working for about a year as a Medical representative in Jabalpur and then in Bhopal. He continued composing music during this phase of his life.

Chattopadhyay returned to Kolkata, and formed a band called Saptarshi with his brothers Pradip Chattopadhyay, Biswanath (or Bishu) Chattopadhyay, first cousin Ranjon Ghoshal, Biswanath's friend Abraham Mazumder, and family friends Tapesh Bandopadhyay and Tapash Das - later Raja Bandopadhyay replacing Tapesh. The band finally settled with the name Moheener Ghoraguli. He worked with the Bauls and Fakirs, creating a new genre of music, 'baul-jazz'. Chattopadhyay introduced a different sound with new lyrics and the guitar, saxophone, bass, and drum set.

Moheener Ghoraguli was not commercially successful at the time, and the band stopped playing in 1981. During the mid-nineties, Chattopadhyay revived Mohiner Ghoraguli by releasing the albums Abar bachhor kuri pore (1995), Jhara shomoyer gaan (1996), Maya (1997), and Khepar gaan (1998). He included new singers and his own compositions, as well as songs composed by others.

Later, Chattopadhyay continued a solo career, composing new songs, composing music for his own films and working as music director for other film-makers. The feature films directed by him include Nagmoti which won the President's Medal at the 1983 National Film Awards. He made A Letter to Mom, a shorter english film on the life of the Anglo Indian community that came out shortly after. He made a second feature film Somoy which was never released.

His first documentary was about the dhakis (drummers) of Bengal called The Primal Call. After that he made several documentaries, including 'The Dinosaurs, The sun temple of konarak to The Naya theatre and Habib Tanvir. He made a short film for the American community television program To Love is to Paint...

Chattopadhyay was invited to Karbi-Anglong in the mid-nineties to work with the Karbi people and to preserve their folk lores and folk music, which they felt was being influenced by film music. Gautam did not believe in just saving their music by making notations and keeping it in an archive, instead, he started teaching the young people to read notations, to play and sing the songs and during this period he came up with the idea of doing an opera with them. He created the opera on their folklore called Hai-mu. About 300 Karbi youth performed in this opera which was a grand success. The Karbis fell in love with Gautam. Gautam then began to make a film in Karbi language, which remained incomplete due to his sudden death in 1999.

== Discography ==
- Shangbigno Pakhikul O Kolkata Bishayak (1977)
- Ajaana UDonto bostu ba Aw-Oo-Baw (1978)
- Drishyomaan Moheener Ghoraguli (1979)

== Filmography ==
=== As director ===
1, Nagmoti National award (in 1983).

2, Shomoy

3, Letter to Mom

4, Rongbin (karbi)

=== As music director ===
- Kichhhu Sanlap Kichhu Pralap (1999)
- Nagmoti (1983)
- Bhalobasa O Andhakar (1982)
- Shomoy
- Rongbin

== Awards and nominations ==
Year	Award	Category	Outcome	Capacity	Work	Notes
1983	National Film Awards	Best Feature Film in Bengali	Won	Director	Nagmoti	
