= Krosswindz =

Indian Bengali rock band

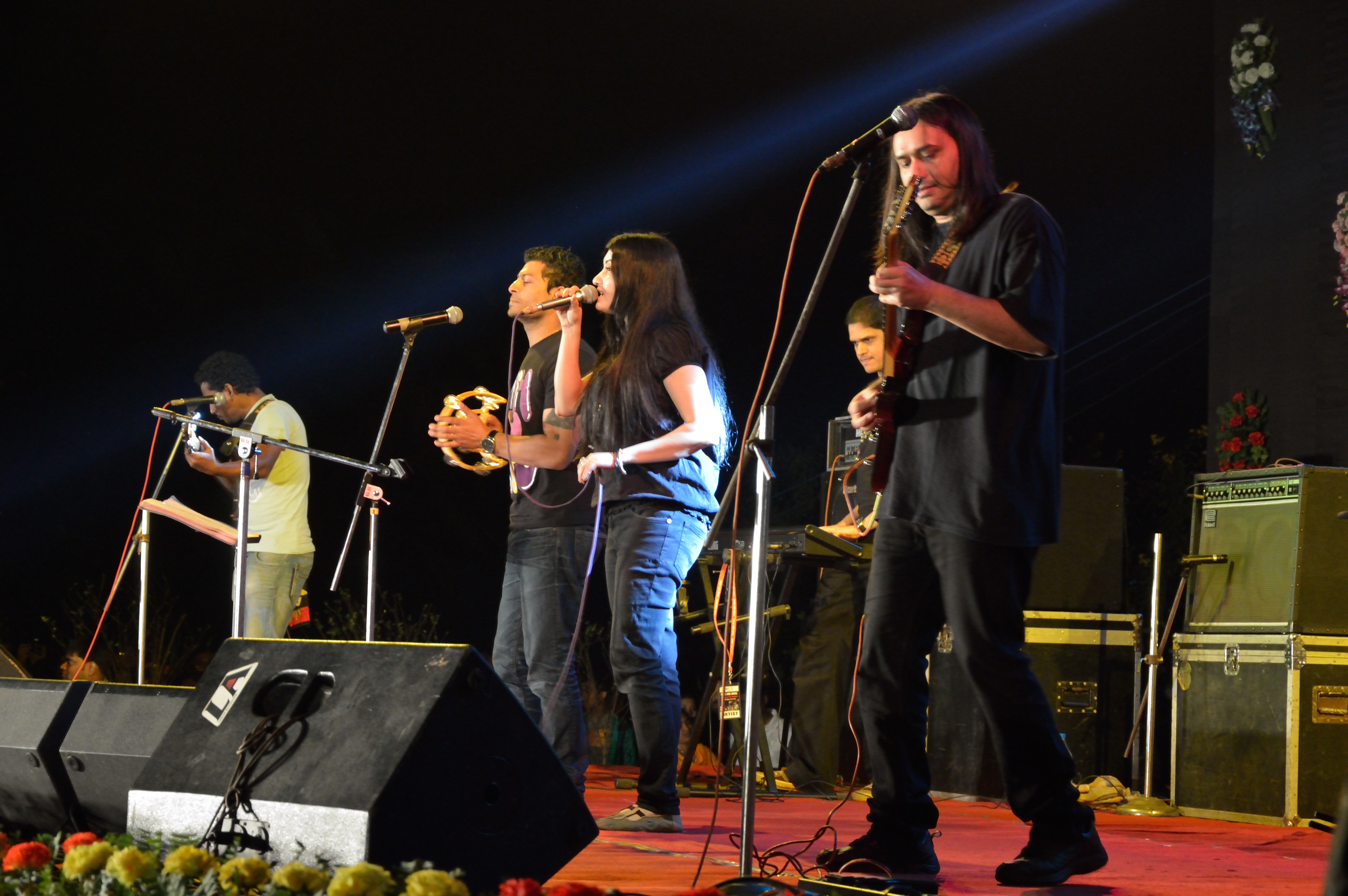
- The Krosswindz in Kolkata

Background information
- Origin: Kolkata, India
- Genres: Bengali Rock, Progressive Rock, Jazz, Fusion
- Occupation: Music
- Years active: 1990–present
- Labels: Saregama; Sagarika Music Pvt. Ltd. Kosmic Music
- Members: Vikramjit (Tuki) Banerjee; Chandrani Banerjee; Ratanjit
- Past members: Bonnie Chakraborty
- Website: www.krosswindz.com

Krosswindz (Bengali: ক্রসউইন্ডস) is a Bengali rock/folk-fusion band, based in Kolkata, India. They have played all over India and abroad and have helped urbanize the folk music of Bengal and have tried to make it popular. Krosswindz is one of the few Kolkata-based Bengali rock bands who have female singers for their lead vocals.

== History ==
The band was formed in 1990 and started out playing at college festivals. Today, they have toured all over India and have played at all major college festivals and stadium concerts. The band has performed and collaborated with internationally reputed names like Herbie Hancock (USA), Sky High (Sweden), Tizian Jost (Germany), Pandit Ramesh Mishra (Indian Sarangi Player) and The Jazz Ambassadors (USA). The band's music has been featured in numerous documentary films and commercials.

== Members ==
- Vikramjit (Tuki) Banerjee - Lead guitars, vocals, songwriter, producer (also worked with Bhoomi)
- Chandrani Banerjee - Lead vocals, Songwriter (also worked with Bhoomi)
- Ratanjit - Keyboards, Indian folk instruments

== Discography ==
Year	Album name	Record label
2015	Jhora Palok	Krosswindz
2011	Phire Dekha	Saregama
2006	Dhoan	Sagarika Music Pvt. Ltd.
2005	Misiki Misiki	Sagarika Music Pvt. Ltd.
2004	Jhiko Jhiko	Sagarika Music Pvt. Ltd.
2003	Music of the Globe	Joe Anthony Productions, USA
2002	Bhebe Dekhecho Ki	Kosmic Music
2002	One World	Kosmic Music
1999	Khyapar Gaan	Asha Audio
1996	Path Gechhe Benke	Sagarika Music Pvt. Ltd.
1995	Aabaar Bochhor Kuri Pore	Asha Audio
1994	Singles	BMG Crescendo (India)

=== Collaboration albums ===
- Aabaar Bochhor Kuri Pore (1995)
