= Rabindra Sadan =

Cultural centre and theatre in Kolkata, India

Coordinates: 22°32′30.65″N 88°20′40.86″E

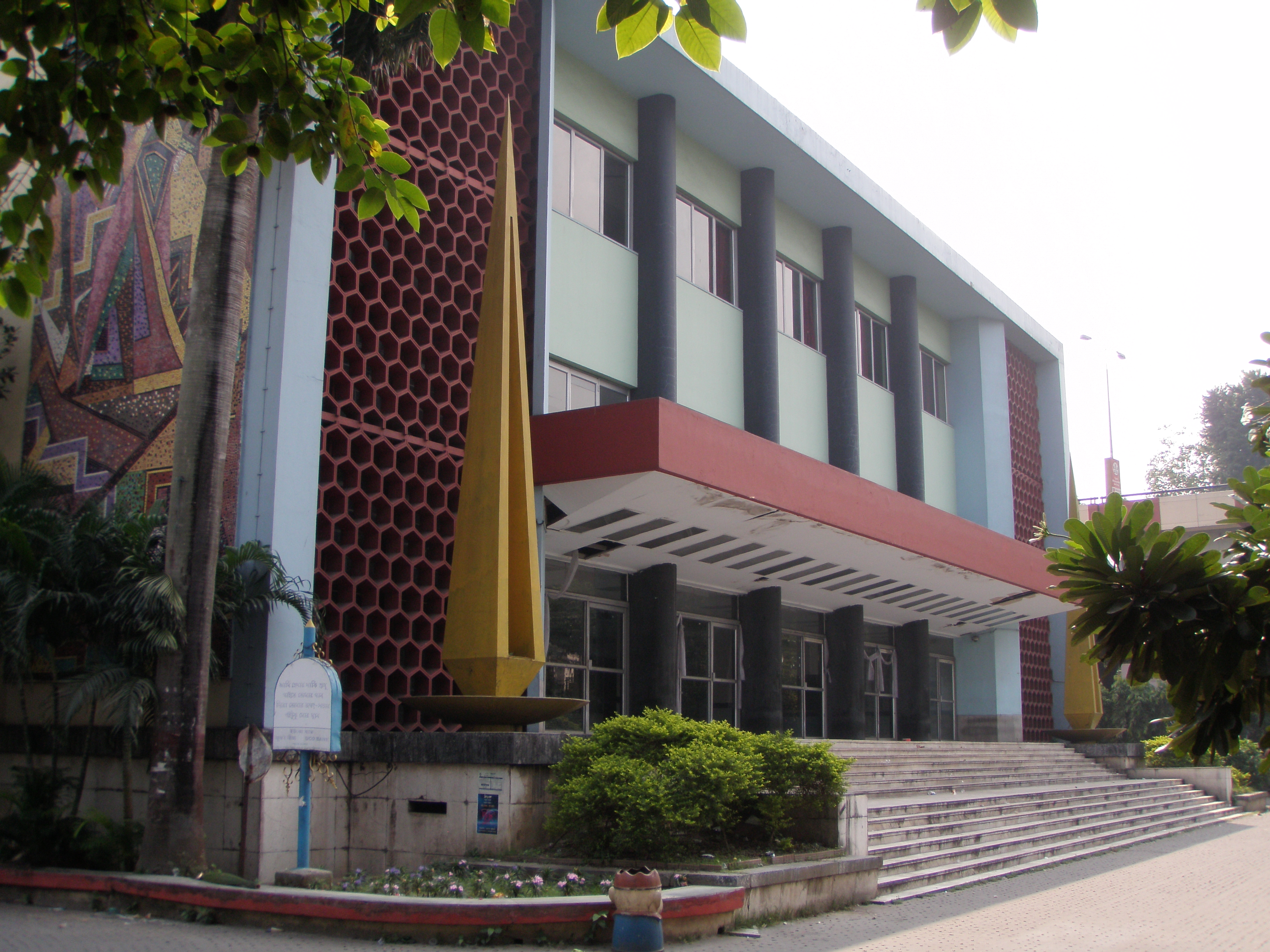
- Rabindra Sadan, Kolkata
- Interactive map of Rabindra Sadan
- Location: South Kolkata, India
- Owner: Government of West Bengal
- Capacity: 1200 (Rabindra Sadan hall)
- Acreage: 4.5 acres
- Public transit: Rabindra Sadan metro station (Blue Line)

Construction
- Opened: 1961
- Renovated: 1999; 2016

Rabindra Sadan is a cultural centre and theatre complex in Kolkata, India. It is located on Acharya Jagadish Chandra Bose Road in South Kolkata. It is noted for its large stage which is a prime venue for Bengali theatre and Kolkata Film Festival. It was established in 1961 to mark the birth centenary of Nobel Laureate Rabindranath Tagore, its foundation was laid by Prime Minister Jawaharlal Nehru on 5 August 1961, and construction was completed in 1967. The venue has since become a major hub for Bengali cultural life, hosting theatre productions, concerts, and the Kolkata International Film Festival. Named in honor of Tagore, the complex has been renovated multiple times, most recently in 2022, and continues to serve as a significant center for artistic and literary expression in West Bengal.

== History ==
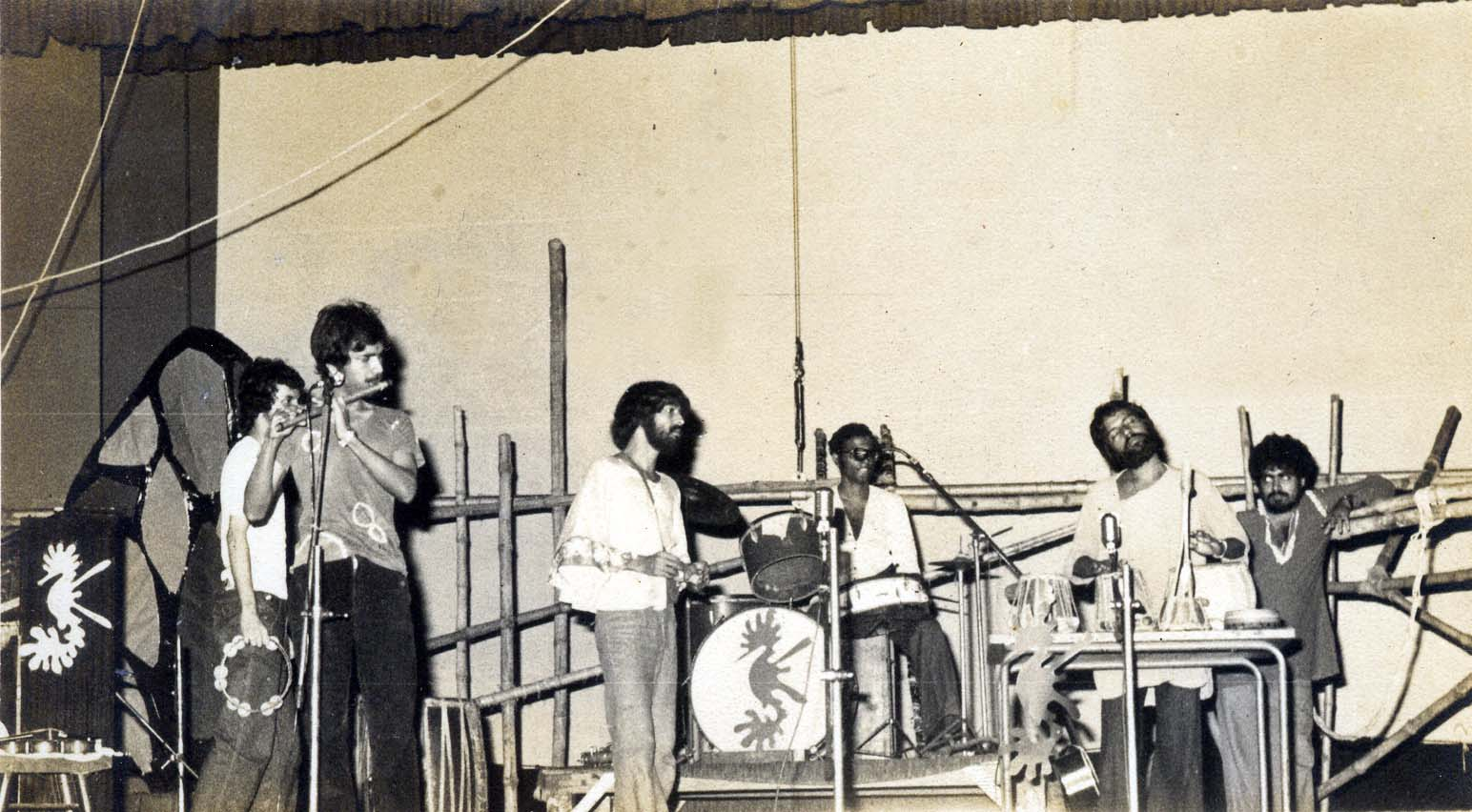
In 1979, Moheener Ghoraguli performed in a concert at Rabindra Sadan

Rabindra Sadan, a prominent cultural and theatre complex in Kolkata, was conceptualized to commemorate the birth centenary of Nobel prize winner Rabindranath Tagore in 1961. The foundation stone was laid by Prime Minister Jawaharlal Nehru on 5 August 1961, and construction was completed in October 1967. The centre was established as a major venue for Bengali theatre and cultural events, including the Kolkata International Film Festival. Named in honor of Tagore, who received the Nobel Prize in Literature in 1913, Rabindra Sadan has since served as a nucleus for Bengali cultural life. The structure has undergone multiple renovations in 1999, 2016, and most recently in 2022 to maintain its modernity and relevance.

== Features ==
The Rabindra Sadan has two storeys. The complex now houses the Rabindra Sadan stage, Nandan, Paschimbanga Bangla Akademi, Gaganendra Pradarshanshala, Sisir Mancha, Nazrul Academy etc. among other centers of cultural activities. Rabindrasadan Auditorium has seating capacity of around 1200 audience. The building is surrounded by serene and peaceful surroundings that create a welcoming atmosphere for visitors. As one enters the premises, the elegant architectural design stands out, reflecting the cultural importance of the space. The auditorium is specially designed with acoustics that enhance sound clarity and emotional impact, allowing every note and word to resonate effectively. In addition to the main Rabindra Sadan stage, the complex houses several other institutions like Nandan, Paschimbanga Bangla Akademi, Gaganendra Pradarshanshala, Sisir Mancha, and the Nazrul Academy, making it a hub for diverse cultural activities.
