= Afrolit Sans Frontieres Festival =

Online literary festival

The Afrolit Sans Frontieres Festival is a virtual literary festival founded by South African author and curator Zukiswa Wanner as a response to the curfews and lockdowns related to the 2019–20 coronavirus pandemic within the African continent.

== Background ==
In an interview with the Mail & Guardian, Wanner talked about how the coronavirus epidemic inspired the festival and how she was able to get in touch with all the writers via WhatsApp. Because she had read their books, it was easier for her to pair them to discuss different topic that would not bore the audience. The eight-day festival brings book lovers together, through live events on Facebook and Instagram. The festival featured prominent African writers reading in English, French and Portuguese.

=== First edition ===
The first edition of the festival took place on Instagram and Facebook Live from March 23 to 30, 2020, featuring 16 African writers: Abubakar Adam Ibrahim, Richard Ali Mutu, Leye Adenle, Hawa Jande Golakai, Chike Frankie Edozien, Maaza Mengiste, Mũkoma wa Ngũgĩ, Nozizwe Cynthia Jele, Yara Monteiro, Bisi Adjapon, Mohale Mashigo, Shadreck Chikoti, Remy Ngamije, Kalaf Epalanga, Natasha Omokhodion-Kalulu Banda, and Zukiswa Wanner.

=== Second edition ===
The second edition, curated by Zukiswa Wanner and Maaza Mengiste, took place from April 20 to 27, 2020. The writers featured were Chris Abani, Elma Shaw, Yvonne Adhiambo Owuor, Ondjaki, Fred Khumalo, Jennifer Nansubuga Makumbi, Mona Eltahawy, Nii Ayikwei Parkes, Sulaiman Addonia, Lola Shoneyin, Edwige-Renée Dro, Hemley Boum, and Ishmael Beah.

=== Third edition ===
A third edition of the festival took place from May 25 to June 1, 2020, with Mohale Mashigo as the co-curator. featuring 16 African writers: Jose Eduardo Agualusa, Leila Aboulela, Tsitsi Dangarembga, Molara Wood, Max Lobe, Mubanga Kalimamukwento, Chimeka Garricks, Dilman Dila, Angela Makholwa, Vamba Sherif, Tanella Boni, Ayesha Harruna Attah, Masande Ntshanga, Beata Umubyeyi Mairesse, Tochi Onyebuchi, and Virgília Leonilde Tembo Ferrão.

=== Fourth edition ===
The fourth edition of the festival took place from June 29 to July 6, and focused on short story writers and poets, with the theme "To Cut A Long Story Short".

=== Fifth edition ===
The fifth edition of the festival, curated by founder Zukiswa Wanner, took place from July 27 to August 2, 2020. The participants were Lerato Mogoatlhe in Johannesburg, South Africa, Joe Khamisi in Texas, USA, Frances Mensah Williams in London, UK, Conceição Evaristo in Rio de Janeiro, Brazil, Kayo Chingonyi in Leeds, UK, L.L. McKinney in Kansas City, USA, Gauz in Abidjan, Cote D’Ivoire, Fiston Mwanza Mujila in Graz, Austria, Ondjaki in Luanda, Angola, Rodrigo França in Rio de Janeiro, Brazil, Ashley Hickson-Lovence in London, UK, and Helon Habila in Centreville, VA, USA, with the final guest being Margaret Busby in London, UK, on August 3.
