= High (musical group) =

Musical group from Kolkata, India

High was an Indian rock group from Kolkata, established in 1974. High marks the efflorescence of American pop and rock music in the city and was contemporaneous with rock bands from other metropolitan cities like Calcutta, Bombay, Goa, Darjeeling and Chennai. Some of the notable ones were The Combustibles and The Savages in Bombay, the Fentones in Shillong and the Mustangs in Madras. High performed in the 1970s and 1980s, disbanding in 1990. Although their music was heavily influenced by British and American rock acts like the Grateful Dead, Allman Brothers' Band, Pink Floyd and Traffic, it was in terms of their original compositions that the band gained a huge cult following.

The original line-up of the band comprised Dilip Balakrishnan (Rhythm Guitar, keyboards, harmonica and vocals), Nondon Bagchi (Drums), Adi Irani (Lead Guitar) and Lew Hilt (Bass Guitar) with Balakrishnan's lyrics and compositions comprising the bulk of the band's original playlist over the years. Dwight Pattison also briefly played in the band.

In addition to songs like 'Monkey Song' and 'Shambhu' that achieved anthem-like status among followers, Balakrishnan and High were unique in that their discography boasted of 3 thematic rock operas – White Knight's Tale (inspired by Lewis Carroll), The Tolkien Suite (based on the poems of JRR Tolkien) and The Winter Planet (about nuclear holocaust).

Although High disbanded with Balakrishnan's death in 1990, the band has retained a cult following over the years. A collection of the band's recordings were released on the Saregama label in 2009.

Nondon Bagchi and Lew Hilt have regrouped periodically with other musicians (Shaukat Ali, Jeff Menezes and others) to bring back the music of High. The band was awarded the 'Rerock Award for Lifetime Contribution to Indian Rock' in 2013.

== Rock and Pop Bands in Calcutta ==
Kolkata's rock scene rose to prominence from the mid-1960s. Some of the notable bands were Cavaliers, Flintstones, Calcutta-16. The Cavaliers was one of the earliest rock bands formed in 1964-65 and went through many iterations. The original lineup was Neil and Robin Sen on guitar and drums, Ricky Chandburn/Carl Oxllay on guitar and saxophone.

Dilip Balakrishnan joined the Cavaliers on rhythm guitar. The Cavaliers were managed by Mr. K.C. Sen, a 'veritable institution in Calcutta showbiz.' He ran an agency called 'The Bangwagon' and he managed all kinds of acts, including girlie floor shows, mimicry artistes and ventriloquists. Bandwagon was an event management and talent hunting agency which hosted regular shows to encourage young musicians and performers of all kinds. The company manufactured several 'pop groups' like the Clefs, the Juniors, the Undergrads and the Waggoners.

Cavaliers, formed in 1966, consisted of Neil and Robin Sen, K.C Sen's sons, Fats Kapoor, Lew Hilt and then in a later iteration, Balakrishnan joined them. They were playing in restaurants, clubs, fashion shows and parties. The Cavaliers were also among the earliest to record original music in India. Their first was 'Close to you' produced in July 1967 but it was the B side single, 'Love is a Mango' that became a hit after it was released in Harry's Music House in Calcutta.

== The Great Bear ==
Devdan Sen used to play in a band called the Calcutta 16 with John Brinnand, P.C Mukherjee, and Nondon Bagchi. Sen went on to form the Great Bear with the same people in 1969 and Dilip Balakrishnan joined the band along with Lew Hilt on bass. Although, the Great Bear played covers of Traffic, Stones, Beatles, Cream, Hendric to CSNY---they were also the first group to play a one-hour-long original rock opera called The White Knight's Tale, inspired by Lewis Caroll. Balakrishnan recalls

'White Night's Tale is my favourite. People who are a bit non-sensical really get me. I can identify with their eccentricity. Sometimes its sad, sometimes its funny. I had a melody and I had no words until suddenly I was reading Lewis Carrol and the words of his white knight's tale fitted. The eccentric lyrics fitted into the graveyard, somber atmosphere of the melody.

The first performance was held at Kala Mandir on 5 March 1972. Dilip wrote most of the music for that concert and lead singer John Brinnand and Devdan Sen also contributed. For this concert the lineup was John Brinnand on lead vocal, Dilip Balakrishnan on Vocals and Rhythm, Eddie Rynjah on vocals and bass, P.C. Mukherjee on lead, Nondon Bagchi on drums. The stage manager was Naveen Kishore, owner proprietor of Seagull Books. The Seagull Empire concert was produced by Sumit Roy and the concert brochure sets out the musical agenda of the group:

The purpose of "Seagull Empire" from which we have tried to exclude any form of exhibitionism, is to open through the sensuous art of the visual depiction, channels along which your mind would flow under the influence of Rock music. Our visual effects aspire to be relevant to the kind of music we are presenting as opposed to the momentary sensationalism, through such media as vibrant colour patterns, promoted by the usual run of beat shows.

In 'The Rock Transition', the second phase of "Seagull Empire" we have attempted to trace the evolution of Rock music from the early Beatles to "now music". We are not presenting a detailed historical record of Rock music. All we want to do is to pay a tribute to those who have contributed and influenced this form of music, the most, in the last decade....

Which brings us to the finale 'The White Knight's Tale, a brief rock opera which definitely indicates that the probable subsequent phase of Rock Music is likely to be on the lines of Rock Fantasy.

In 2021, Tejan Balakrishnan put together an album for 'The White Knight's Tale' using the 'scratchy tapes of private home recordings of Baba and his musical brother (and bass legend) Lew uncle, recorded in the early 80's'. Their opening song, for the section 'In My Mind: A Selection of Great Bear Originals' was titled 'Seagull Empire' written by John Brinnand. This song would later lend its name to a famous independent publishing house Seagull Books owned by Naveen Kishore who was involved in producing the Seagull Empire show. The lyrics of the song goes as follows:

Save it for a rainy day

Sunday Monday Tuesday

Come with me come away

Come with me and come to stay

I live all alone in my Seagull Empire

I live all alone in my Seagull Empire.

No explanations take my hand

Follow the foam you'll understand

And you could see what it all means

The sea turns red the sky is green

We live all alone in our Seagull Empire's

We live all along in our Seagull Empire...

As Great Bear, they also participated in the Simla Beat Contest of 1970, which featured competition between several Indian beat groups.

== The Formation of High ==
High was formed in 1974. John Brinnand and Devdan Sen, the founding figures of The Great Bear, had left the scene. The original High line-up was Dilip Balakrishnan, Nondon Bagchi, Lew Hilt and Adi Irani.

In 1975 High performed in Bombay for the Synchrony concert. Their introductory session, which involved an hour long session of rock music where they played their favourite rock bands of the world, was called 'A First Experience' Adi Irani was on lead guitar, Lew Hilt on bass and Nondon Bagchi on drums. Dilip Balakrishnan 'stole the show with his pyrotechnic vocalisation of 'Shock Shock' and 'Skelington'. They performed The White Knight's Tale. In 'Synchrony', other bands which made a mark on the audience were Savage Encounter of Bombay. The lineup consisted of Bashir, Michael, Barry Murray and Darryl.

The High also set more of Tolkien's poems to music and compiled another piece called The Songs of Adventure. Though this piece received lukewarm reviews initially, a concert at Rabindra Sadan titled 'Highways,' finally saw the breakthrough:

The feeling of fantasy was gradually built up by three guitars, rhythm, lead and bass, reaching an intensity of almost hypnotic repetition, punctuated by periodic bell-like notes on the key-boards. And once having established the mood, the songs flowed easily enough without one feeling uneasy at being unable to recall where in The Lord of the Rings the lyrics were to be found.

Balakrishnan wrote two more rock operas, Tolkien Suite and Winter Planet. The former was performed at the Kala Mandir basement for a concert called 'Axis' on 23 December 1982. Winter Planet, as Balakrishnan stated in a concert in Kohima in 1987, was a reference to an imminent nuclear holocaust.

In 1989, High staged its final concert in Jadavpur University for an audience of over 3000 people which, unlike their usual lineups, consisted mostly of High originals.^{[8]}

Re-Union Concert in 1991

In 1991, Balakrishnan's friends put together a concert 'A Concert for Dilip'. The digitized brochure of the concert situated High in the urban history of rock music and reproduced a number of articles on the band that came out in the Junior Statesman.

Facebook group 'High'

Tejan Balakrishnan, Dilip Balakrishnan's son, runs a Facebook group which has brought together a large number of people who were involved with the band.
