= Christian Hohmann =

Art dealer

Christian Hohmann (born March 6, 1974) is an art dealer and art gallerist.

== Early life and education ==
Hohmann was born in Walsrode, Germany. Two years after his birth, in 1976, his parents Werner and Ursula opened their first art gallery.

In 1993, Hohmann started studying art history at the University of Trier in Trier, Germany.

== Career ==
In 1993, Hohmann opened his first fine art print publishing business, in Walsrode, Germany, which was centered around a print by European artist Rudolf Hausner called The Butterfly Woman. In November 1995, he opened his first gallery, Galerie Hohmann. Hohmann staged exhibition of Rudolf Hausner's work upon the occasion of the first anniversary of his death in 1996. In 1996, he organized four shows, including a display of the work of Herwig Zens and an Eberhard Eggers show called Curious About People. It also featured a show by artist Andora, a gentleman known for painting on money. Lastly Hohmann displayed fine prints and sculptures by Jörg Immendorff.

Hohmann presented a show of the work of Egyptian artist Mohamed Abla in 1997. That year's other shows included Straight Lines Are Ungodly: Gerarde Linien sind Gottlos; a look at Richard Lindner's brand of pop art; and Lois Wagner's The Color of Wood and the Power of Imagination.

In 1998, Hohmann arranged a show centered around New Realism in the 1920s, including work by Christian Schad wherein objects on a silver plate were lit transferring an impression onto the paper below them. In 1998, together with art dealer Thomas Levy, he opened Galerie Levy Hohmann. Shows included the portraits of painter Heinz Rabbow in Cross Currents. In 1999 the Marc Chagall show Worry Not, Levitate was mounted at this gallery. That year, Hoffman also produced the Leather, Latex, Blooms and Staged Celebrities show and participated in the Photo Triennale. The year ended with a Francis Bacon exhibition titled Love is the Devil.

In 2000, Hohmann was profiled in the Millennium Hamburg and was recognized for dealing with prominent 20th century artists, including Christian Schad, Francis Bacon and Jörg Immendorff. That year, he staged a show called Joan Miró: When Worthless Things Turn into Magic which featured paintings, fine prints and sculptures by the artist and the gallerist's first serious, published adjunctive catalog. From 2001 to 2002 he opened a project space, the Kunstraum Linienstrasse in conjunction with Levy Hohmann in Berlin, Mitte. That period's show highlights were an Eberhardt Hückstädt exhibition called Erotic on Historic Ground as well as Intoxicated by Painting – featuring Rudolph Hauser's daughter Xenia Hausner's work. In 2002, he closed both the Hamburg and Berlin galleries, and moved to the United States.

In 2002, Hohmann joined Eva Hart as director of her new gallery in Palm Desert, CA. and organized exhibitions from a number of artists, including Joan Miró, Chagall, and Gabriele Münter, as well ascontemporary artists Paul Wunderlich, Eberhard Hückstädt and Karin Voelker through 2009.

In 2009, with the retirement of Eva Hart and the closing of the Hart Gallery, Hohmann opened the gallery Christian Hohmann Fine Art nearby. In 2011 the gallery was expanded, incorporating the adjacent building.

In 2012, Hohmann presented a show of the work of Armin Mueller-Stahl. In 2012 he exhibited fine prints by Marc Chagall (catalog) and in 2014 fine print and originals by Joan Miró (catalog). He represents the estates of David Schneuer (1905–1988) and Robert Freimark (1922–2010).

According to the gallery web site, Hohmann has published more than 40 catalogs and participated in the following art fairs: Scope (2004), Los Angeles Art Show (2010,2011, 2012), Red Dot Miami (2013), Silicon Valley Art Fair (2015), Palm Springs Fine Art Fair (2012, 2013, 2014, 2015, 2016).

In 2014 the gallery logo and name was changed from "Christian Hohmann Fine Art" to "HOHMANN®”
