= Raquel Araujo =

Mexican playwright

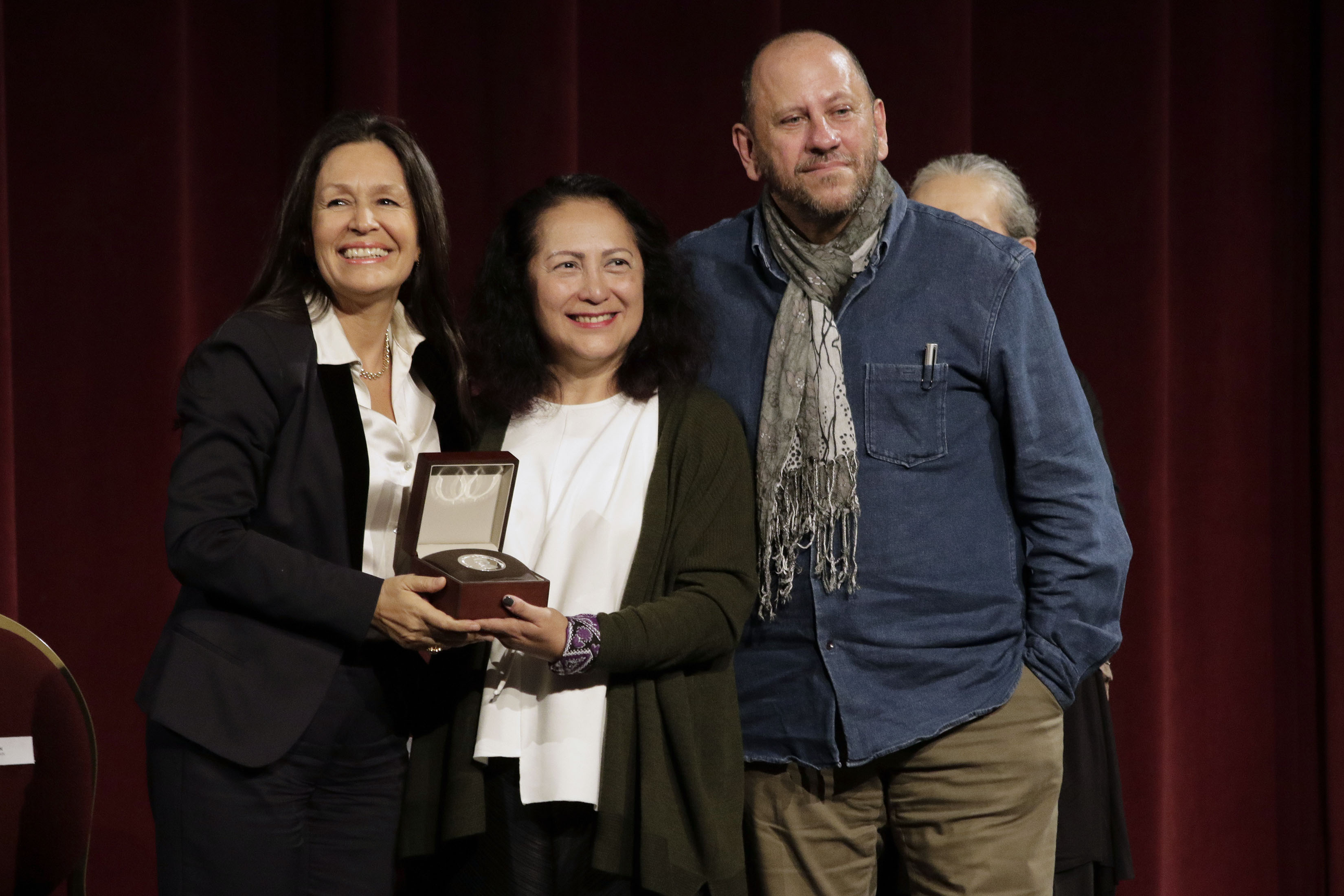
- Raquel Araujo (center) receiving the Xavier Villaurrutia medal.
- Born: 3 August 1964 (age 62); Ticul, Yucatán, México
- Occupations: Theatre director; actress; playwright
- Spouse: Óscar Urrutia

Raquel Araujo Madera (born August 3, 1964) is a Mexican actress, playwright and theatre director. She's a founder of both the Department of Scenic Arts in the Instituto de Cultura de Yucatán and the Center of Scenic Research of Yucatán, as well as Teatro La Rendija. She has been a member of the Artistic Advisory Council of the National Theatre Company of Mexico.

== Career ==
Araujo founded the Teatro La Rendija in 1998 and has been its art director ever since. In 1998 she premieres her play Horizones de Sucesos, and in 2001, Óvalo. Between 1997 and 2001 she was the Information and Dissemination Coordinator for the Rodolfo Usigli National Center for Theater Research. In 2002 she founded the Department of Scenic Arts in the Instituto de Cultura de Yucatán and the Center of Scenic Research of Yucatán. She also founded the Department of Scenic Arts of the Universidad de las Artes de Yucatán, where she's also a professor.

She's done various presentations in the Muestra Nacional de Teatro, as well as other international showcases with plays such as Estrategias fatales, Condesa Sangrienta, Los errores del subjuntivo, Vitrinas, La importancia del llamarse Ernesto, Uncle Vanya, Viñetas Chejovianas y Medea Múltiple.

Raquel's technique follows the dramatic proposals of Gabriel Weisz Carrington, better known as "theatre of the body".
