= Zukiswa Wanner =

South African journalist, novelist and editor (born 1976)

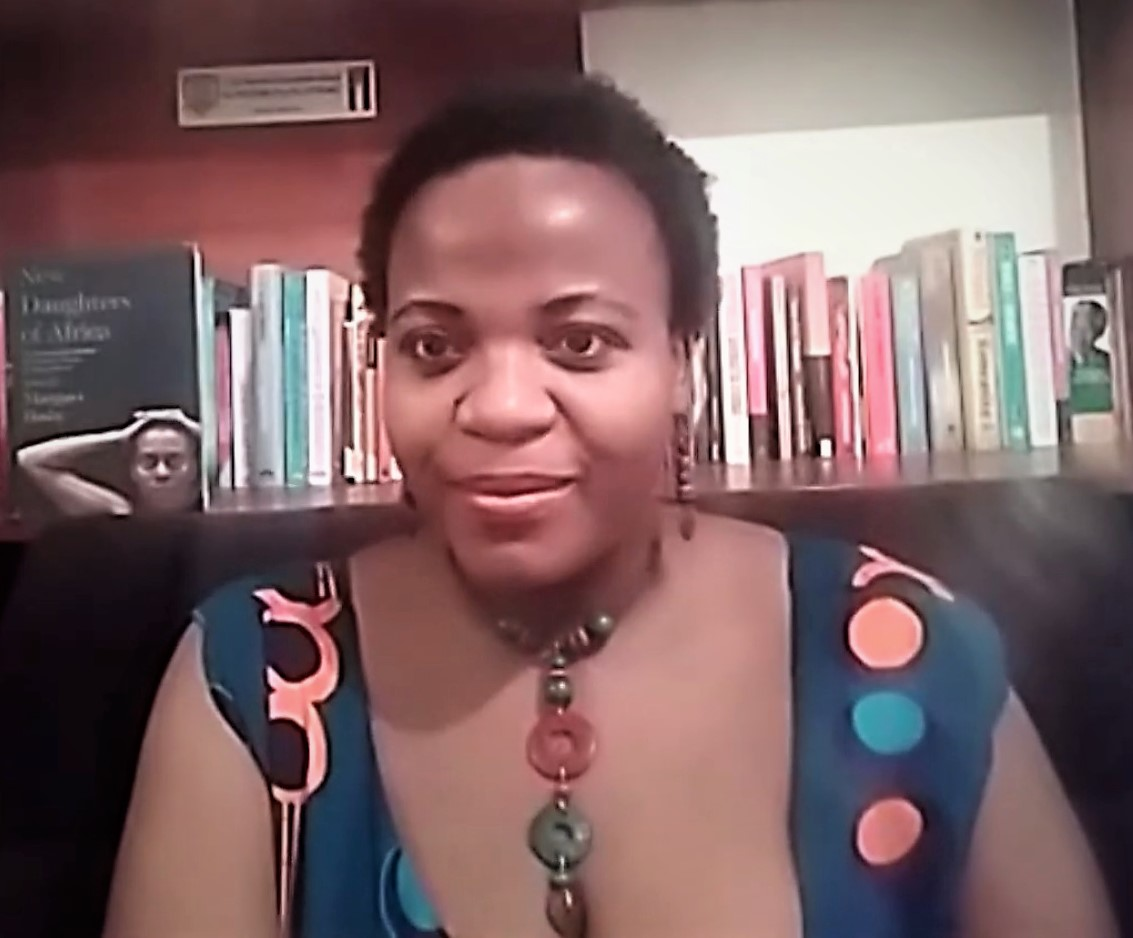
- Wanner discusses anthology New Daughters of Africa in 2020
- Born: 30 July 1976 (age 50); Lusaka, Zambia
- Education: Hawaii Pacific University, Honolulu
- Occupations: Journalist; novelist
- Organization: Afrolit Sans Frontieres Festival
- Notable work: London Cape Town Joburg (2014)
- Awards: Africa39; K Sello Duiker Memorial Literary Award
- Writing career
- Period: 2006–present
- Genres: Fiction, non-fiction, children's books
- Website: zukiswa-wanner.com

Zukiswa Wanner (born 30 July 1976) is a South African journalist, novelist and editor born in Zambia and now based in Kenya. Since 2006, when she published her first book, her novels have been shortlisted for awards including the South African Literary Awards (SALA) and the Commonwealth Writers' Prize. In 2015, she won the K Sello Duiker Memorial Literary Award for London Cape Town Joburg (2014). In 2014, Wanner was named on the Africa39 list of 39 Sub-Saharan African writers aged under 40 with potential and talent to define trends in African literature.

In 2020, Wanner was awarded the Goethe Medal alongside Ian McEwan and Elvira Espejo Ayca, making Wanner the first African woman to win the award. In March 2024, she returned the medal, depositing it at the German embassy in Nairobi, with her reason for doing so being cited as the German government's role in the ongoing Gaza war.

== Life and career ==
Zukiswa Wanner was born on 30 July 1976 in Lusaka, Zambia, to a South African father and a Zimbabwean mother. After receiving primary and secondary education in Zimbabwe, she studied for a degree in journalism at Hawaii Pacific University in Honolulu.

Her debut novel, The Madams, was published in 2006 and has been called "a racy and hilarious take on the black economic empowerment crowd in Johannesburg". It was shortlisted for the K Sello Duiker Award of the South African Literary Awards (SALA) in 2007. She went on to write three other novels: Behind Every Successful Man (2008), Men of the South (2010), which was shortlisted for the 2011 Commonwealth Writers' Prize (Africa region), as well as the Herman Charles Bosman Award, and 2014's London Cape Town Joburg, which won the K Sello Duiker Memorial Literary Award in 2015.

In 2010, she co-authored two works of non-fiction: with South African photographer Alf Kumalo A Prisoner's Home, a biography on the first Mandela house 8115 Vilakazi Street, and L'Esprit du Sport with French photographer Amelie Debray. Wanner is co-editor, with Rohini Chowdhury, of the African-Asian short-story anthology Behind the Shadows (2012). In addition, Wanner has written two children's books, Jama Loves Bananas and Refilwe – an African retelling of the fairy tale "Rapunzel". In 2018, her third nonfiction work Hardly Working, a travel memoir, was published by Black Letter Media.

She was one of 66 writers to write a contemporary response to the Bible, the works being staged at the Bush Theatre and at Westminster Abbey in October 2011.

She is a founding member of the ReadSA initiative, a campaign encouraging South Africans to read South African works. She also sat on the pan-African literary initiative, Writivism's Board of Trustees until September 2016. She is a regular participant at international literary events and has conducted workshops for young writers in Zimbabwe, South Africa, Denmark, Germany and Western Kenya.

In 2015 Wanner was also one of three judges of the Etisalat Prize for Literature, a Pan-African literary prize for book-length fiction, and she was the African juror for the Commonwealth Short Story Prize 2017. She has also been the founder and curator of Artistic Encounters in Nairobi, Kenya. In 2020, in response to the COVID-19 lockdown she founded and curated the Afrolit Sans Frontieres Festival, which first took place on 23 March via Facebook and Instagram, with further editions being held subsequently. The festival has featured prominent African writers including Maaza Mengiste, Fred Khumalo, Chris Abani, Yvonne Adhiambo Owuor, Shadreck Chikoti, Abubakar Adam Ibrahim, Mũkoma wa Ngũgĩ, Jennifer Nansubuga Makumbi, Mona Eltahawy, Nii Ayikwei Parkes, Sulaiman Addonia, Chike Frankie Edozien, and Lola Shoneyin, among others.

In 2018, Wanner set up her publishing company, Paivapo, in partnership with her friend and businessperson Nomavuso Vokwana, with a focus on marketing African literature in the Anglophone, Francophone and Lusophone African regions.

A prolific journalist, essayist and short-story writer, she has been a contributor to a wide range of newspapers and magazines, including The Observer/The Guardian, Sunday Independent, City Press, Mail & Guardian, La Republica, Open Society, The Sunday Times, African Review, New Statesman, True Love, Marie Claire, Real, Juice, OpenSpace, Wordsetc, Baobab, Shape, Oprah, Elle, Juice, Guernica, Afropolitan and Forbes Africa. Her short story "This is not Au Revoir" is included in the 2019 anthology New Daughters of Africa, edited by Margaret Busby.

In November 2023, Wanner released a collection of essays entitled Vignettes of a People in an Apartheid State, reflecting what she witnessed in Palestine, where she went in May 2023 for the Palestine Festival of Literature.

Wanner currently lives in Nairobi, Kenya, having visited for the first time in 2008 and moved there three years later.

In 2025, Wanner was among four South Africans – the others being Nkosi Zwelivelile Mandela (grandson of Nelson Mandela), Reaaz Moolla and Dr Fatima Hendricks – sailing with the Global Sumud Flotilla (GSP) international maritime initiative with a mission to break the blockade of the Gaza Strip, who were detained by the Israeli special forces when the humanitarian fleet was intercepted on 1 October. Wanner's book about the experience, titled Flotilla: A Journey of Conscience, was published in 2026.

== Awards and honours ==
In April 2014, Wanner was named on the Hay Festival's Africa39 list of 39 Sub-Saharan African writers aged under 40 with potential and talent to define trends in African literature.

In July 2014, she was chosen for "Twenty in 20", an initiative to select twenty works of fiction considered as South Africa's best literature since 1994 best stories in South African literature.

In 2015, at the South African Literary Awards (SALA), she won the K Sello Duiker Memorial Literary Award for her novel London Cape Town Joburg (2014).

In 2020, Wanner was awarded the Goethe Medal, a yearly prize given by the Goethe-Institut honouring non-Germans "who have performed outstanding service for the German language and for international cultural relations".

In December 2020, she was chosen by Brittle Paper as "African Literary Personality of the Year".

In February 2024, she returned her Goethe Medal not as a criticism of the Goethe-Institut but rather the German government, citing the government's complicity in the ongoing Palestinian occupation as a callousness to human suffering.

In April 2026, the University of the Free State conferred on Wanner the honorary degree Doctor of Letters for her body of work and life of service.

== Bibliography ==
=== Novels ===
- The Madams, Oshun Books, 2006. ISBN 978-1770070585
- Behind Every Successful Man, Kwela Books, 2008. ISBN 978-0795702617
- Men of the South, Kwela Books, 2010. ISBN 978-0795702983
- London Cape Town Joburg, Kwela Books, 2014. ISBN 978-0795706301
- Love Marry Kill, Kwela Books, 2024, ISBN 978-0795711022

=== Non-fiction ===
- 8115: A Prisoner's Home with Alf Kumalo, Penguin, 2010
- Maid in SA: 30 Ways to Leave Your Madam, Jacana, 2010. ISBN 978-1431408962
- Hardly Working: A Travel Memoir of Sorts, Black Letter Media, 2018. ISBN 9780987019813
- Vignettes of a People in an Apartheid State, Periferias, 2023
- Flotilla: A Journey of Conscience, 2026

=== Children's books ===
- Jama Loves Bananas, Jacana, 2013
- Refilwe (an African retelling of "Rapunzel"), Jacana, 2014. ISBN 978 1431400980

=== As editor ===
- With Rohini Chowdhury, Behind The Shadows. Contemporary Stories from Africa and Asia (2012)
