= Goethe Medal =

German award

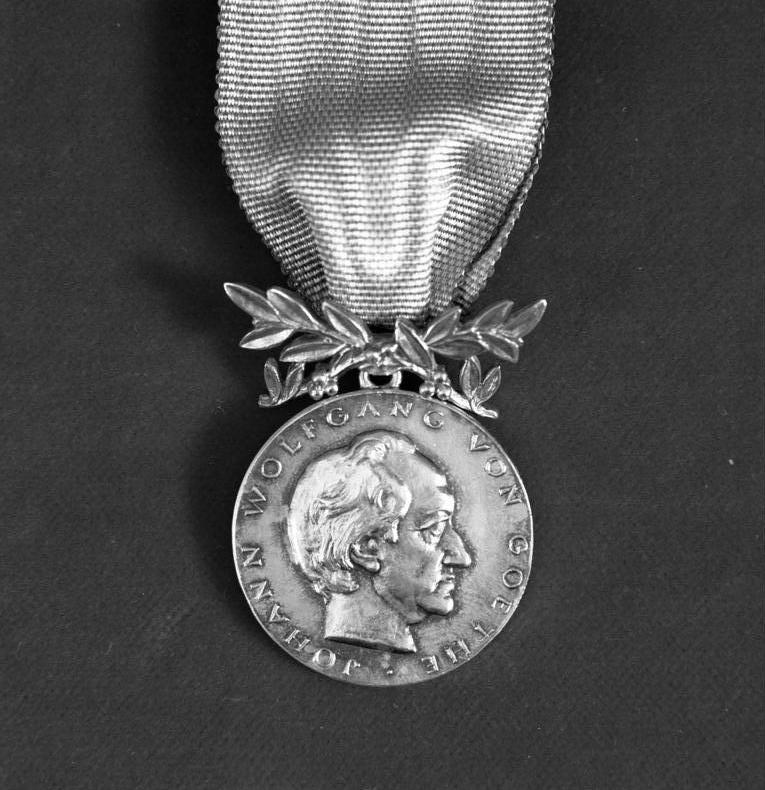
Goethe-Medal obverse

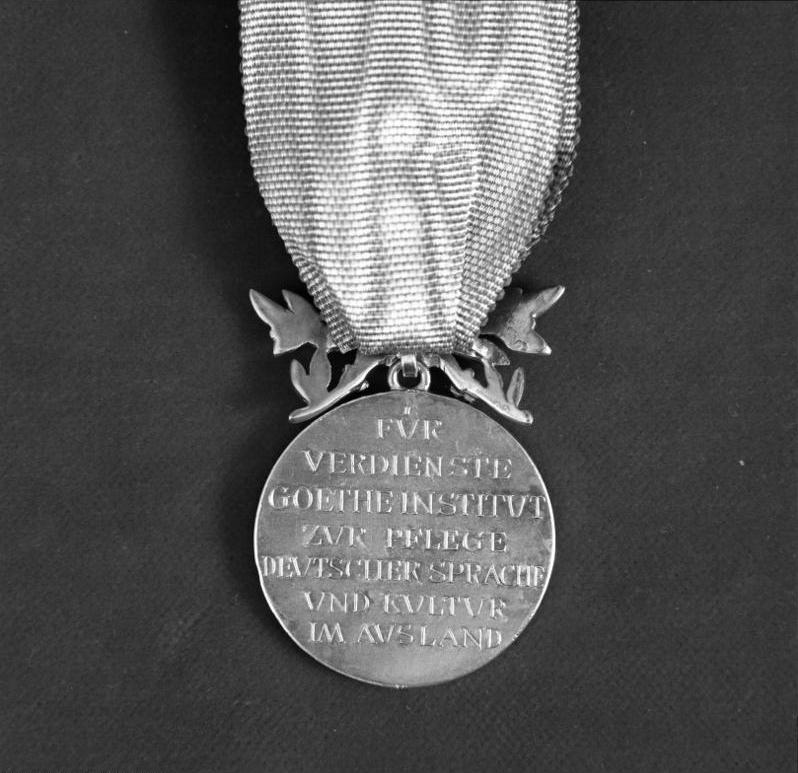
Goethe-Medal reverse

The Goethe Medal, also known as the Goethe-Medaille, is a yearly prize given by the Goethe-Institut honoring non-Germans "who have performed outstanding service for the German language and for international cultural relations". It is an official decoration of the Federal Republic of Germany. The prize used to be given on 22 March, the anniversary of Goethe's death. Since 2009, it has been given on 28 August, the anniversary of Goethe's birth. The first awards were made in 1955. In the intervening years, through 2018, a total of 348 women and men from 65 countries have been so honored. It is not to be confused with Goethe-Medaille für Kunst und Wissenschaft (1932–1944), Goethe Prize and Goetheplakette der Stadt Frankfurt am Main.

== Recent recipients ==
=== 2026 ===
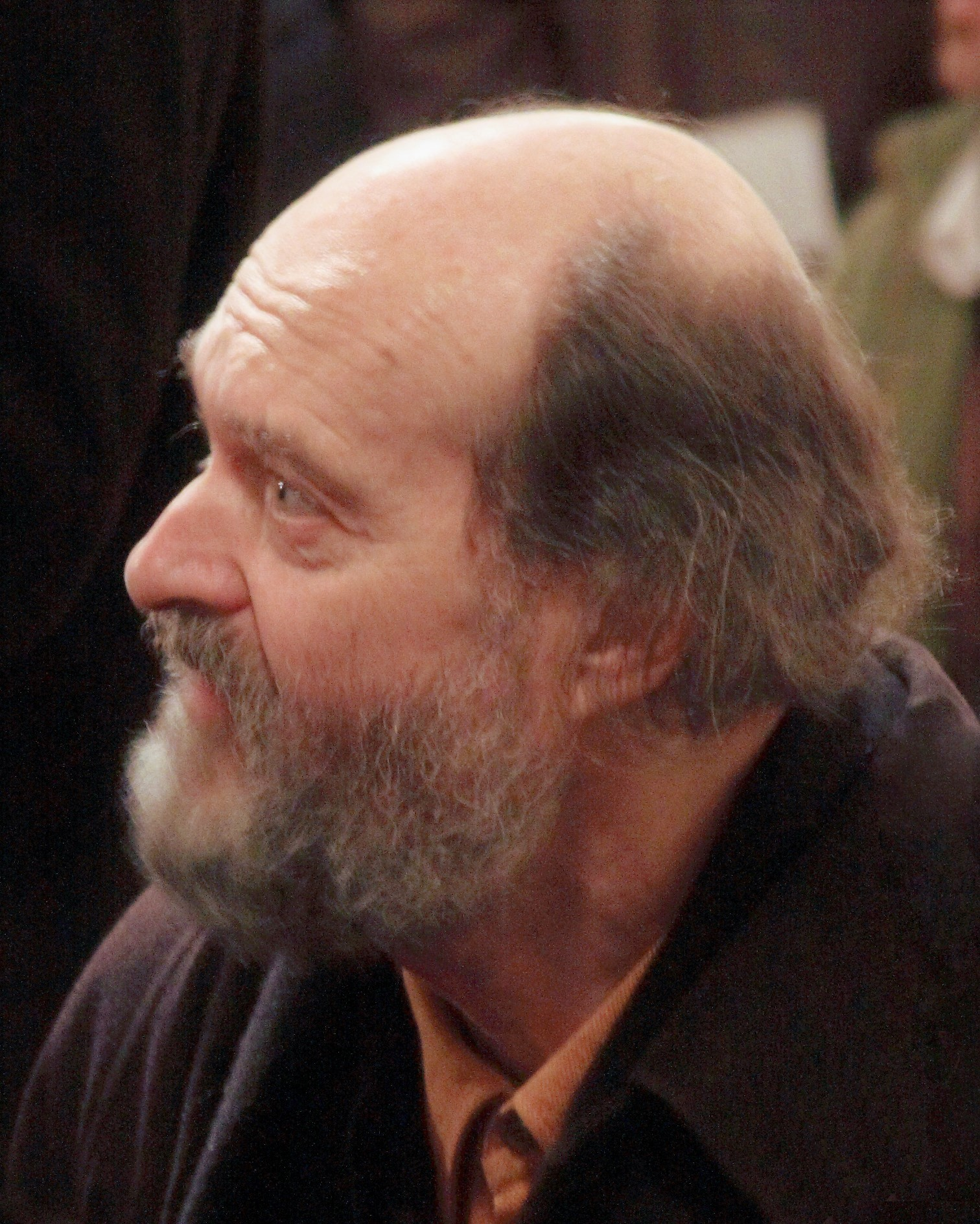
Arvo Pärt, recipient 2026

- Arvo Pärt, composer, Estonia
- Anita Raja, translator, Italy
- Prodromos Tsinikoris, theatre director, dramaturge and actor, Greece

=== 2025 ===
- Osman Kavala, cultural promoter, Turkey
- Li Yuan, German studies scholar, China
- David Van Reybrouck, cultural historian, archaeologist and author, Belgium

=== 2024 ===
- Claudia Cabrera, literary translator and interpreter, Mexico
- Iskra Geshoska, art historian and cultural manager, North Macedonia
- Carmen Romero Quero, founder and director of the theatre festival Teatro a Mil, Chile

=== 2023 ===
- Gaga Chkheidze, film manager, Georgia
- Yi-Wei Keng, curator, dramaturg, and translator, Taiwan
- OFF-Biennale Budapest, Hungary

=== 2022 ===
- Mohamed Abla, multimedia artist, Egypt
- Tali Nates, historian and director of the Johannesburg Holocaust & Genocide Centre, South Africa
- Nimi Ravindran und Shiva Pathak from Sandbox Collective, artists and arts administrators, India

=== 2021 ===
- Marilyn Douala Bell, Socio-economist
- Toshio Hosokawa, Composer
- Wen Hui, Choreographer

=== 2020 ===
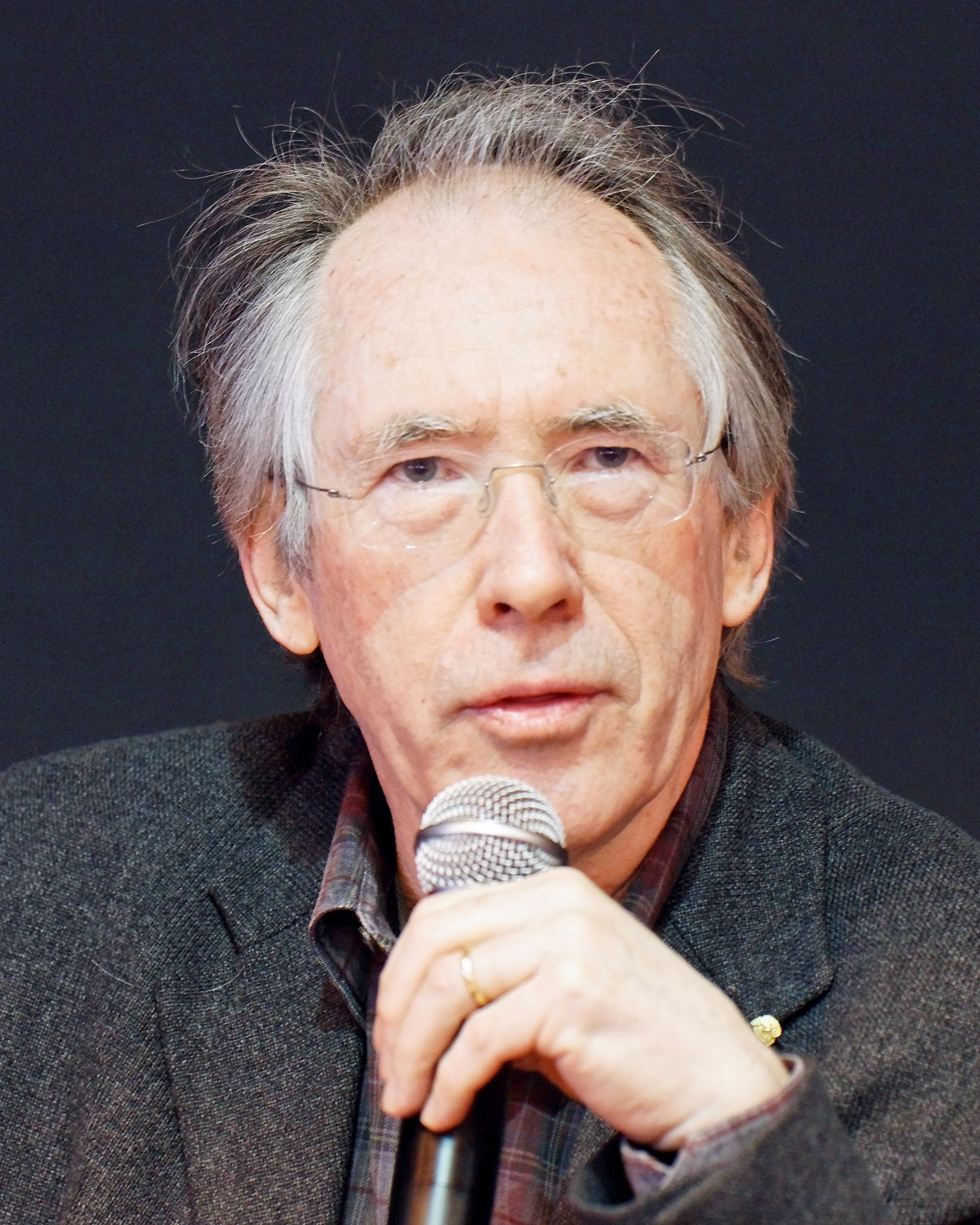
Ian McEwan

- Zukiswa Wanner, Writer, publisher and curator
- Ian McEwan, Author
- Elvira Espejo Ayca, Artist and museum director

=== 2019 ===
- Enkhbat Roozon, Publisher, bookseller and political journalist
- Shirin Neshat, Artist and filmmaker
- Doğan Akhanlı, freelance author of novels and essays in Turkish, and a play in German

=== 2018 ===
- Heidi Abderhalden and Rolf Abderhalden (Mapa Teatro), Colombian theater maker
- Claudia Andujar, Brazilian photographer and activist
- Péter Eötvös, Hungarian composer and conductor

=== 2017 ===
- Urvashi Butalia, Indian feminist and historian
- Emily Nasrallah, Lebanese writer
- Irina Shcherbakova, Russian historian and journalist

=== 2016 ===
- Akinbode Akinbiyi, British-Nigerian photographer
- Yurii Andrukhovych, Ukrainian writer and translator
- David Lordkipanidze, Georgian anthropologist and archaeologist

=== 2015 ===
- Sadiq Jalal al-Azm, Syrian philosopher and writer
- Neil MacGregor, British art historian and former museum director
- Eva Sopher, German-Brazilian cultural entrepreneur

=== 2014 ===
- Krystyna Meissner, Polish director
- Robert Wilson, American director and playwright
- Gerard Mortier, (posthumously) Belgian opera director

=== 2013 ===
- S. Mahmoud Hosseini Zad, Persian translator of German literature.
- Naveen Kishore, publisher of Seagull Books.
- Petros Markaris, Greek novelist.

=== 2012 ===
- Irena Veisaitė
- Bolat Atabayev
- Dževad Karahasan, Bosnian writer

=== 2011 ===
- John le Carré
- Adam Michnik
- Ariane Mnouchkine

=== 2010 ===
- Ágnes Heller, Hungarian philosopher
- Fuad Rifka
- John Spalek

=== 2009 ===
- Lars Gustafsson
- Victor Scoradet
- Sverre Dahl

=== 2008 ===
- Gholam Dastgir Behbud
- Bernard Sobel
- John E. Woods

=== 2007 ===
- Daniel Barenboim
- Dezső Tandori
- Kim Min-ki

=== 2006 ===
- Vera San Payo de Lemos
- Giwi Margwelaschwili
- Said

=== 2005 ===
- Samuel Assefa
- Ruth Klüger
- Dmytro Zatonsky
- Yoko Tawada
- Simone Young

=== 2004 ===
- Mohan Agashe
- Kevin Willie
- Imre Kertész
- Paul Michael Lützeler
- Anatoli A. Michailow
- Sergio Paulo Rouanet

=== 2003 ===
- Lenka Reinerová
- Jorge Semprún

=== 2002 ===
- Werner Michael Blumenthal
- Georges-Arthur Goldschmidt
- Francisek Grucza
- Touradj Rahnema
- Antonio Skármeta

=== 2001 ===
- Adonis
- Sofia Gubaidulina
- Gerardo Marotta
- Werner Spies

=== 2000 ===
- Nicholas Boyle
- György Konrád
- Daniel Libeskind
- Sara Sayin
- George Tabori
- Abdel-Ghaffar Mikkawy

== Other notable recipients ==
20th century recipients are:

- 1957: Hans Trümpelmann
- 1960: Hermann Boeschenstein
- 1961: Robert Minder
- 1963: Marian Szyrocki
- 1967: Peter Jørgensen
- 1968: Gertrud Seidmann
- 1969: Cornelis Soeteman
- 1970: Pierre Bertaux
- 1973: Chetana Nagavajara
- 1976: Pierre-Paul Sagave, Elichi Kikuchi, Waichi Sakurai, John Asher, Ingerid Dal
- 1982: Ekrem Akurgal, Werner Kraft
- 1983: Bruno Bettelheim
- 1985: Alokeranjan Dasgupta, Johannes Edfelt
- 1987: Gordon A. Craig, Pierre Boulez, Pavica Mrazović
- 1988: George Mosse, Pierre Bourdieu, Giorgio Strehler
- 1989: Ernst Gombrich
- 1990: György Ligeti, Thomas Messer, Hubert Orłowski, Eda Sagarra, Hilde Spiel
- 1991: Leslie Bodi, Jan Hoet, Panagiotis Kondylis, Eduardo Paolozzi, Hans Sahl
- 1992: Elisabeth Augustin, Karl Raimund Popper, Hugo Rokyta
- 1993: Michel Tournier
- 1994: István Szabó, Billy Wilder
- 1995: Isang Yun, Hermann von der Dunk
- 1996: Jan Křen
- 1997: Nam June Paik, Rolf Liebermann
- 1998: Ralf Dahrendorf
- 1999: Dani Karavan, Leoluca Orlando, Jiří Gruša

== Controversy ==
South African novelist Zukiswa Wanner and Egyptian artist Mohamed Abla returned their Goethe Medals in protest of Germany's support of Israel during Israel's bombing campaign in the Gaza Strip.
