= Mexican theater =

Mexican theater can refer to:

- Mexican drug war, the Mexican theater of the US war on drugs
- National Theatre of Mexico
- National Theatre Company of Mexico
