= Andújar (disambiguation) =

Andújar is a city in Andalusia, Spain.

Andújar may also refer to:

- Andújar Cedeño (1969–2000), Dominican Major League Baseball player
- Claudia Andujar (born 1931), Swiss-born Brazilian photographer and indigenous rights activist
- Joaquín Andújar (1952–2015), Dominican Major League Baseball player
- Pablo Andújar (born 1986), Spanish tennis player
- Mariano Andújar (born 1983), Argentine football goalkeeper
- Miguel Andújar, (born 1995), Dominican Major League Baseball player
- Stephanie Andujar (born 1986), American actress
