= Heidi Abderhalden =

Swiss-Colombian artist and theatre director

Heidi Abderhalden Cortés
- Born: 1962 (age 63–64); Bogotá, Colombia
- Occupation: Theatre director
- Employer: Mapa Teatro

Heidi Abderhalden (born 1962) is a Swiss-Colombian artist and theatre director. In 1984 she co-founded and since then she has co-directed Mapa Teatro in Bogotá. Together with her co-director and brother, Abderhalden has been recognised for her notable efforts in breaking down cultural barriers through fifty years of dedicated work. In 2018, they were honoured with the Goethe Medal, a prestigious award in the field of culture and arts.

== Life ==
She was born in Bogotá. Her mother was Colombian and her father was Swiss. Her family's first language was French and she and her brother left Colombia after school there to study at the L'École Internationale de Théâtre Jacques Lecoq. Abderhalden studied all aspects of theatre production in Lausanne and Paris and became a director and a Dramaturge.

She, her sister Elizabeth and her younger brother Rolf Abderhalden co-founded Mapa Teatro in Paris in 1984, before moving their partnership to Bogotá in 1986. Elizabeth remained in Paris but she continued to be the theatre's costume designer. They based their theatre in a building that was saved from decay and destruction by their interest and occupation. Their theatre collective has functioned for over fifty years and at many times in a country under arms facing internal conflict. It is now known as one of the leading artistic companies in Colombia. In 2000 the theatre company took on a former hotel as their base in a less well to do area of Bogotá. Their creations have included Testigo de las Ruinas in 2005 about the destruction of a community and in Los Incontados the play looks at contemporary violence and the country's civil war

Her own project is 1000voces.com which started on 16 September 2017 and it records the oral history of women affected by war. It is known as “La Ruta Pacífica de las Mujeres project” (The Peaceful Route of Women project).

In 2018 she and her brother Rolf were awarded the Goethe Medal for their work with Mapa Teatro in breaking down cultural barriers.
