= Globe to Globe Festival =

The Globe to Globe Festival ran at Shakespeare's Globe from 23 April to 9 June 2012 as part of the World Shakespeare Festival, itself part of the 2012 Cultural Olympiad. The festival's director was Tom Bird.

The Globe to Globe Festival hosted 37 productions of Shakespeare's plays in 37 different languages over a six-week period. The festival was primarily intended to be an experiment with foreign language Shakespeare in the languages of London, however, it also aimed to discover how important Shakespeare is to the rest of the world. The Festival was recorded through blog responses on the Theatre's own website and on the Year of Shakespeare blog.

More than 100,000 people attended the performances, 80% of whom had not previously been to the Globe.

== Performances ==
Play	Language(s)	Company
Taming of the Shrew	Urdu	Theatre Walley, Pakistan
Venus and Adonis	Zulu, Xhosa, Sesotho, Setswana, Afrikaans, English	(South Africa) Isango Ensemble
Troilus & Cressida	Māori	(New Zealand) Ngākau Toa
Measure for Measure	Russian	(Russia) Vakhtangov Theatre
The Merry Wives of Windsor	Swahili	(Kenya) Bitter Pill
Pericles	Greek	National Theatre of Greece
Twelfth Night	Hindi	(India) Company Theatre
Richard III	Mandarin	National Theatre Company of China
A Midsummer Night's Dream	Korean	(South Korea) Yohangza Theatre Company
Julius Caesar	Italian	(Italy) 369gradi artistic director Valeria Orani
Cymbeline	Juba Arabic	The South Sudan Theatre Company
Titus Andronicus	Cantonese	(Hong Kong) Tang Shu-Wing Theatre Studio
Richard II	Arabic	(Palestine) Ashtar Theatre
Othello	English Hip Hop	(United States) Q Brothers / Chicago Shakespeare Theatre / Richard Jordan Productions
The Tempest	Bangla	(Bangladesh) Dhaka Theatre
Macbeth	Polish	(Poland) Teatr im. Kochanowskiego
The Two Gentlemen of Verona	Shona	(Zimbabwe) Two Gents Productions
Henry VI: Part I	Serbian	(Serbia) National Theatre in Belgrade
Henry VI: Part II	Albanian	National Theatre of Albania
Henry VI: Part III	Macedonian	(North Macedonia) National Theatre of Bitola
Henry IV: Part 1	Mexican Spanish	National Theatre Company of Mexico
Henry IV: Part 2	Argentine Spanish	(Argentina) Elkafka Espacio Teatral
King John	Armenian	(Armenia) Gabriel Sundukyan National Academic Theatre
King Lear	Belarusian	Belarus Free Theatre
As You Like It	Georgian	(Georgia (country)) Marjanishvili Theatre
Romeo & Juliet	Brazilian Portuguese	(Brazil) Grupo Galpão
Coriolanus	Japanese	(Japan) Chiten
Love's Labour's Lost	British Sign Language	(United Kingdom) Deafinitely Theatre
All's Well that Ends Well	Gujarati	(India) Arpana
The Winter's Tale	Yoruba	(Nigeria) Renegade Theatre
The Taming of the Shrew	Urdu	(Pakistan) Theatre Wallay
Antony and Cleopatra	Turkish	(Turkey) Oyun Atölyesi
The Merchant of Venice	Hebrew	(Israel) Habima National Theatre
Henry VIII	Castilian Spanish	(Spain) Rakatá
The Comedy of Errors	Dari Persian	(Afghanistan) Roy-e-Sabs
Timon of Athens	German	(Germany) Bremer Shakespeare Company
Much Ado About Nothing	French	(France) Compagnie Hypermobile
Hamlet	Lithuanian	(Lithuania) Meno Fortas
Henry V	English	(United Kingdom) Shakespeare's Globe
