= Chike Frankie Edozien =

Nigerian-American writer and journalist

- Born: June 10, 1970 (age 56)
- Occupations: Writer; journalist
- Organization: New York University

Chiké Frankie Edozien is a Nigerian-American writer and journalist. He is currently the director of New York University, Accra. He directed the New York University Journalism Institute's Ghana based Reporting Africa program from 2008 to 2019. He is a journalist who honed his skills writing about government, health and cultural issues for a variety of publications.

== Career ==
He is the author of the 2017 book Lives of Great Men, a Lambda Literary Award winner. Lives was shortlisted for the Randy Shilts Award for Non-Fiction in 2018 by the Publishing Triangle. Edozien has spoken about the themes of freedom, perseverance, and courage expressed in Lives around the world from India to Australia to New Zealand to South Africa and Nigeria as well as Ghana and the United States.

His work has been examined in universities around the world from Yale University to New York University to Manchester Metropolitan University as well as Kristu Jayanti College, Bangalore, University of Delhi, and more.

Originally published in the UK and US by Rikki Beadle-Blair and John R. Gordon's Team Angelica Press, in July 2018 it was brought out in South Africa by Jacana Books. Lives is available in West Africa and East Africa since 2018 on Ouida Books.

Lives is an exploration of the lives of contemporary LGBTQ men and women on the African continent and in the diaspora. Edozien's "Shea Prince" was shortlisted for the 2018 Gerald Kraak Human Rights Award and his "Last Night in Asaba" was shortlisted again in 2019 for the Gerald Kraak and was part of the book As You Like It earning him a second Lambda award in 2019. His "Forgetting Lamido" was also anthologized in Safe House: Exploration in Creative Nonfiction. In 2018 Edozien wrote the introduction for the New Internationalist Edition of Queer Africa: Selected Stories a collection of drawn from two ground breaking anthologies from around Africa.

His work has appeared in The Times (UK), Vibe, Time, Transition Magazine, Out Traveler, Black AIDS Institute, The Advocate, Quartz, New York Times, Jalada, Atlas Obscura and more.

Edozien is a founding member of Afrolit Sans Frontieres Festival, a virtual literary festival founded by South African author and curator Zukiswa Wanner as a response to the curfews and lockdowns related to the 2019–20 coronavirus pandemic.

He was awarded New York University's Martin Luther King Jr Faculty Award in 2017 for excellence in teaching, community building, social justice advocacy and leadership. While living in New York, Edozien was an award-winning New York Post reporter for 15 years, and its City Hall reporter from 1999 to 2008 where he was the lead writer on legislative affairs. He covered crime, courts, labor issues, human services, public health and politics, reporting from around the country and abroad for the paper.

Edozien's work on the shooting death of Amadou Diallo by four New York police officers was featured in episode three of Netflix's Trial by Media ("41 Shots"). He is one of the over 100 African writers to speak out in an unprecedented open letter against police brutality worldwide.
