= Doğan Akhanlı =

Turkish-German writer (1957–2021)

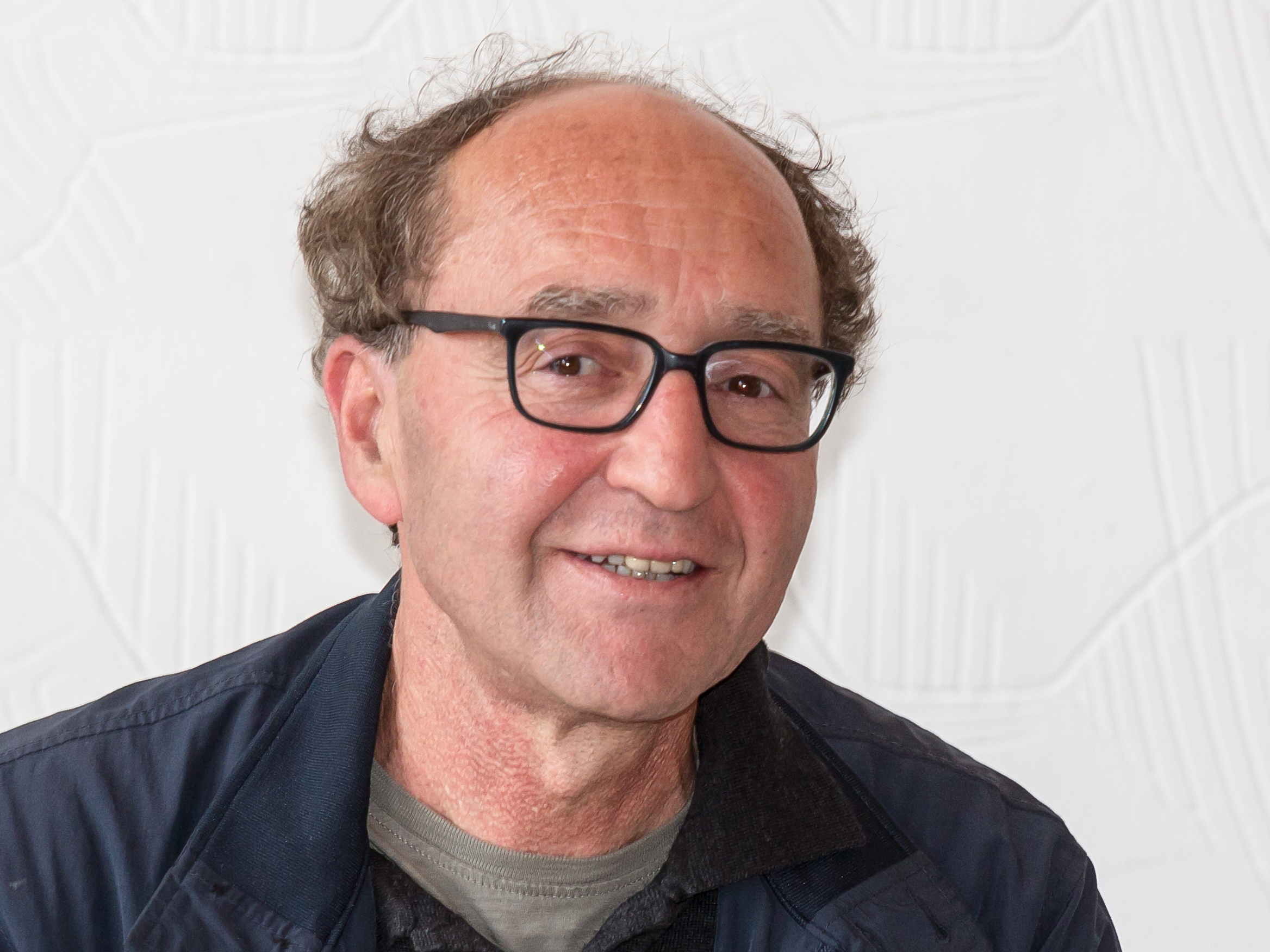
- Akhanlı in 2017
- Born: 18 March 1957; Şavşat, Artvin Province, Turkey
- Died: 31 October 2021 (aged 64); Berlin, Germany
- Citizenship: German
- Occupations: Novelist, essayist
- Writing career
- Language: Turkish
- Notable awards: Goethe Medal
- Website: dogan-akhanli.de

Doğan Akhanlı ([doːˈ‿an aˈhanlɯ]; 18 March 1957 – 31 October 2021) was a Turkish-born German writer, and author of novels, plays, and essays, mostly in Turkish. He had been living in exile in Germany since 1992, after his political views led to several arrests in Turkey. His work is focused on the major genocides of the 20th century, the systematic extermination of the Armenians and the Jews. Critics praised him for his storytelling and his engagement in human rights work. In 2019, he was awarded the Goethe Medal for his political engagement, in particular for more understanding between Armenians, Turks, and Kurds.

== Life ==
Akhanlı was born in Şavşat in the Artvin Province located in the northeastern part of Turkey in 1957. He grew up in this small village. When he was 12 he moved to live with his older brother in Istanbul and to continue his education. He studied history and pedagogy.

In 1975, Akhanlı was arrested and held for a brief period for buying a left-wing paper. This incident led to his political interest and engagement. He joined the banned party Revolutionary Communist Party of Turkey (TDKP). After the coup d'état in 1980 he went underground. From 1985 to 1987 he, his wife, and their 18-month-old son were imprisoned for political reasons in a military jail in Istanbul, where he and his wife were tortured. In 1992 he fled to Germany and requested asylum. He lived in Cologne as a writer of political prose and essays, novels, and theatre plays from 1992 onward. In 1998 the Turkish authorities stripped him of his citizenship. Three years later he became a German citizen.

Akhanli was a collaborator of the association recherche international e.V., which furthers the investigation of the Armenian genocide, committed in the first quarter of the 20th century. He repeatedly raised his voice to debate the crimes against the Armenians. He also initiated the foundation of the Raphael Lemkin Library in Cologne, named after the man who first used the term Völkermord (genocide), in 1944.Akhanlı believed that denial of the Armenian genocide is one of the main reasons "why violence, torture and despotism are still a reality in Turkey today".

On 10 August 2010, Akhanlı was arrested upon arrival in Turkey where he had traveled to visit his sick father. He was kept in investigative detention due to an alleged participation in a 1989 robbery incident. In December 2010 he was released for lack of evidence. The trial continued in 2011 in his absence. Akhanlı denied any involvement in the crime and denounced the accusation as politically motivated and constructed. On 12 October 2011, Akhanlı was acquitted "for lack of evidence". Two witnesses had withdrawn their accusations, stating that they were forced by police to name Akhanlı. Thereafter the Turkish authorities imposed an entry ban on the writer which was heavily criticized by German politician Cem Özdemir. In April 2013, the acquittal was lifted and an international arrest warrant was issued.

On 19 August 2017, the Spanish police arrested Akhanlı in Granada at the request of Turkish authorities. After an intervention of German foreign minister Sigmar Gabriel he was set free, but he was not allowed to leave Madrid until the court decided about the Turkish extradition request, with a ruling expected within forty days. On 20 August 2017, German chancellor Angela Merkel sharply criticized the Turkish government for abusing the international institution Interpol. On 19 October 2017, Akhanlı returned to Germany.

Akhanlı was a member of the PEN Centre Germany and has repeatedly spoken in favour of imprisoned Turkish writers such as Aslı Erdoğan. He was active in promoting dialogue between different cultures, religions, and ethnic groups. In 2002, Akhanlı began guided tours in German and Turkish at the EL-DE Haus, the former Gestapo prison in Cologne, and lectured about "Anti-Semitism in the immigrant society". He moved to Berlin, where he initiated a project Flucht, Exil und Verfolgung (Flight, Exile and Persecution).

Akhanlı died from cancer in Berlin on 31 October 2021.

== Awards ==
In 2018, Akhanlı received the Europäischer Toleranzpreis für Demokratie und Menschenrechte (European Tolerance Award for Democracy and Human Rights) of the Austrian PEN Club and the city of Villach. In 2019, Akhanlı was awarded the Goethe Medal. The jury noted his long-term engagement, in great clarity and without simplification, for more understanding between Armenians, Turks and Kurds ("... dass er sich seit langem mit großer Klarheit für Erinnerungskultur und Völkerverständigung zwischen Armeniern, Türken und Kurden ohne jedwede Simplifizierung eingesetzt habe").

== Work ==
Akhanlı consistently displayed a very direct and open approach to historical violence, defending the universality of human rights and searching for the cause of the violence of the masses. His commitment in literature and political statements centered around the genocides of the 20th century, the Armenian genocide and the Shoah. His literature promotes cross-cultural dialogue and combines it with a call to reconciliation.

He wrote about his work: "I write in Turkish, but I live in Germany. This is a difficult situation because I am not part of German literature, I am part of Turkish literature."

He wrote his novels in Turkish. His trilogy Kayip Denizler (The Seas That Disappeared) ends with Kıyamet Günü Yargıçları (Judges of Last Judgement) set during the Armenian genocide. This part of the trilogy was translated into German. He wrote a novel, Madonna'nin Son Hayali (Madonna's Last Dream) about a 1942 incidence when a ship with more than 700 Jewish refugees was sunk in the Black Sea by a Russian submarine. It was translated into German in 2019. He wrote a play in German, Annes Schweigen (Anne's Silence) which was premiered at Berlin's Theater unterm Dach in 2012. It deals with the Armenian genocide from a German perspective. The topic of his 2010 book Fasil is a late meeting of a torturer in Turkey and his victim. His 2019 book Verhaftung in Granada oder: Treibt die Türkei in die Diktatur? (Arrest in Granada or: Is Turkey Heading to Dictatorship?) deals with his 2017 arrest in Spain. His major works were translated into German.

=== Books ===
- 1998/99: Trilogoy Kayıp Denizler (The Seas That Disappeared).
  - I. Denizi Beklerken (Waiting for the Sea) ISBN 978-975-344-178-0, OCLC 925970717
  - II. Gelincik Tarlası (The Poppy Field) ISBN 979-975344188-8, OCLC 1005284379
  - III. Kıyamet Günü Yargıçları (Judges of Last Judgement) ISBN 978-975-344-199-5, OCLC 1136273026
- 2005 Madonna'nın Son Hayali (Madonna's Last Dream). ISBN 978-605-9976-00-8, OCLC 962737393
- 2009 Babasız günler (Days without Father). ISBN 978-605-4069-45-3, OCLC 837054416
- 2010 Fasıl. ISBN 978-975-545-258-6, OCLC 733778136

==== Works in German ====
- Die Richter des Jüngsten Gerichts. translated by Hülya Engin, Kitab, Klagenfurt 2007, ISBN 978-3-902005-98-4
- Die Tage ohne Vater, translated by Önder Endem, Kitab, Klagenfurt 2016, ISBN 978-3-902878-65-6
- Annes Schweigen, play
- Verhaftung in Granada oder Treibt die Türkei in die Diktatur?, translated by Engin, Kiepenheuer & Witsch, Cologne 2018, ISBN 978-3-462-05183-4
- Madonnas letzter Traum, translated by Recai Hallaç, Sujet Verlag, Bremen 2019 ISBN 978-3-96202-401-7, OCLC 1273493093

=== Interviews ===
- "Wenn ich auf Deutsch schreiben könnte, wäre es natürlich einfacher..." (If I could write in German, it would of course be easier), interview with Georg Simet
- Interview mit dem türkischen Schriftsteller Dogan Akhanli: Zwischen den Fronten (Between the fronts), interview with Eren Güvercin, qantara.de
- "Jeder muss sich mit dem Holocaust beschäftigen" (Everybody has to deal with the Holocaust), Interview with Dirk Eckert, taz
- "Für viele Türken kein Thema" (For many Turks not a topic), interview with Jürgen Schön, taz
- "Migranten haben keinen Persilschein" (Migrants have no Persilschein), interview with Semiran Kaya, taz
