= Vera San Payo de Lemos =

Portuguese professor (born 15.5.1951)

- Born: 15.5.1951
- Education: University of Lisbon and Universidade Nova de Lisboa
- Occupation: University professor
- Employer: University of Lisbon
- Known for: translation

Vera San Payo de Lemos (born 1951) is a Portuguese professor. She has translated many notable works from German into Portuguese and her awards include the Goethe Medal in 2006. Her works have appeared on the stage and on television.

== Life ==
Lemos was born in 1951. Her first degree was in German studies which she obtained from the Faculty of Arts of the University of Lisbon. For her master's degree she again studied in Lisbon but this time in the Faculty of Social and Human Sciences of the Universidade Nova de Lisboa.

In 1980 she began her collaboration with João Lourenço which resulted in the staging of many plays which they worked on together. Their work has included the plays of Bertolt Brecht, German Tankred Dorst, American Sam Shepard, the Irish playwright Conor McPherson, Austrian Werner Schwab, Botho Strauss, American Eugene O'Neill, British playwright Shelagh Delaney, Canadian Carole Fréchette and William Shakespeare. For her work in translating the difficult works of Werner Schwab she was awarded the Austrian Prize for Literary Translation in 1998 and 2002.

Her plays with Lourenco have been staged at Teatro Aberto, Teatro Nacional de São Carlos and Teatro Nacional D. Maria II. Her work was staged on television in 1980s and 1990s and she has made personal TV appearances and interviews.

In 2003 she was awarded the Critics Prize from the Portuguese Association of Theater Critics and in 2006 she received the Goethe Medal. The German award was made on 22 March which is Johann Wolfgang von Goethe's date of Death.

== Works include ==
- 1996 O Ensaio (TV Movie) (teleplay)
- 1995 Alguém Olhará Por Mim (TV Movie) (teleplay)
- 1994 O Tempo e o Quarto (TV Movie) (teleplay)
- 1994 Um Sabor a Mel (TV Movie) (adaptation)
- 1993 A Ópera dos Três Vinténs (TV Movie) (translation)
- 1991 Desejo Sob os Ulmeiros (TV Movie) (teleplay)
- 1991 O Suicidário (TV Movie) (teleplay)
- 1991 Loucos Por Amor (TV Movie) (adaptation)
- 1990 Happy End (TV Movie) (translation)
- 1990 Romeu e Julieta (TV Movie) (teleplay)
- 1989 A Rua (TV Movie) (teleplay)
- 1987 Jardim das Cerejas (TV Movie) (teleplay - as herself)
- 1986 and 2002 Odisseia no Terreiro do Paço (TV Movie) (play)
- 1985 A Boa Pessoa de Setzuan (TV Movie) (teleplay)
