= Elvira Espejo Ayca =

Indigenous artist, poet, and museum director from Bolivia

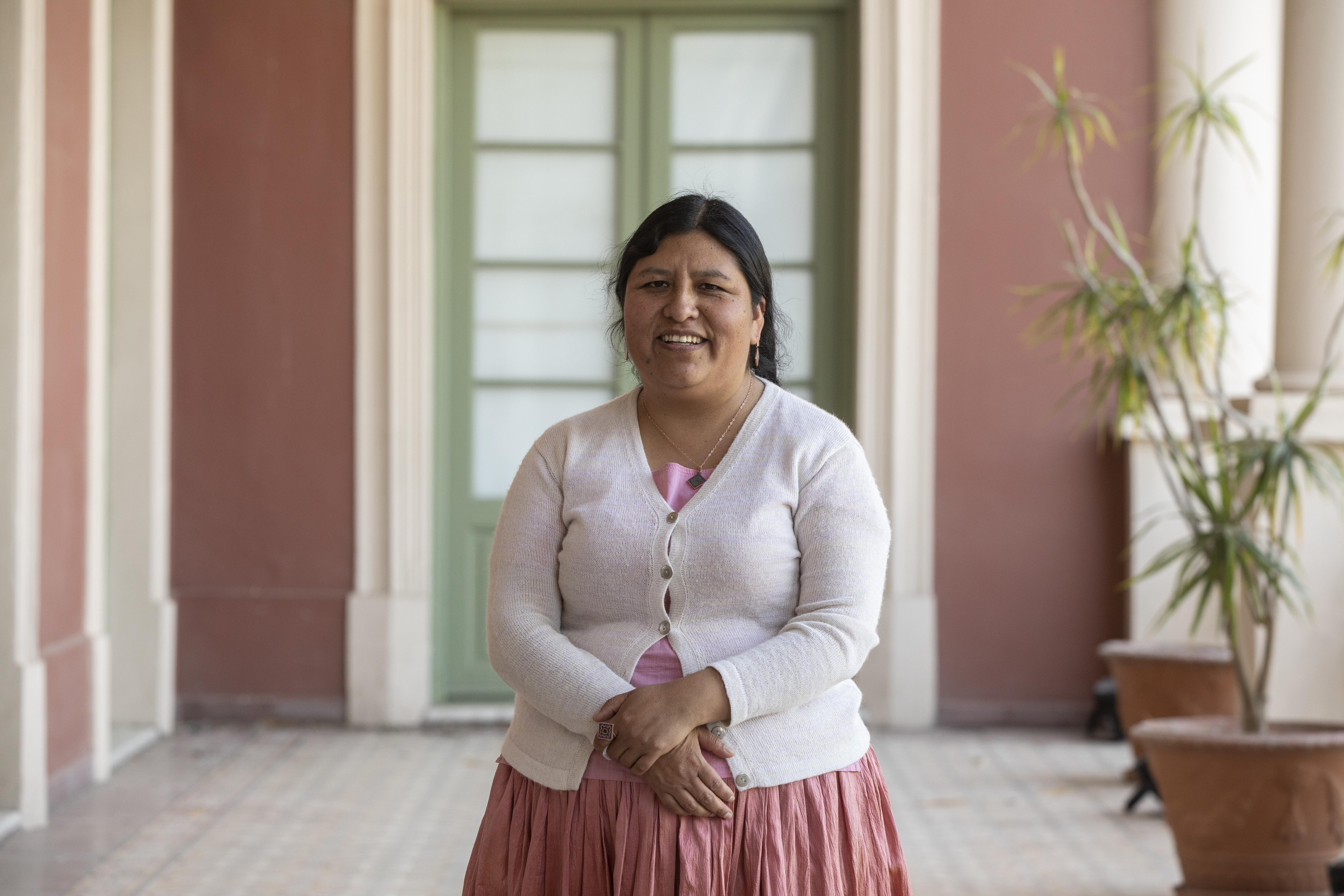
- Ayca in 2022
- Born: 1981 (age 44–45); Oruro Department, Bolivia
- Occupations: Museum director, poet, textile artist
- Known for: Poet, essayist and musician

Elvira Espejo Ayca (born 1981) is an Indigenous Bolivian artist, poet, and the director of the National Museum of Ethnography and Folklore in La Paz until 2020. In 2020 she was a joint winner of the Goethe Medal for improving cultural exchange. She is Aymara and Quechua and speaks both of the Aymara and Quechua languages.

== Life ==
Ayca was born in the Bolivian Oruro Department in 1981. She was brought up in an Indigenous community in the Eduardo Abaroa Province. She was not only encouraged to have ambition and to leave her Ayllu (village community to learn more) named Qaqachaka, but she always remembered her own culture. She went to high school in Challapata where she was attracted to painting. She went on to higher education in La Paz where she studied at Academia Nacional de Bellas Artes Hernando Siles.

She went on to study languages which are not written down. She speaks the Aymara and the Quechua language. Her first ambition had been to paint but after she heard a Japanese Haiku she started to write poetry.

In 2006 she published awutuq parla and Phaqar kirki-t ́ikha takiy takiy – Canto a las Flores. The latter is a book of poems which won her "best international poet" at the World Festival of Venezuelan Poetry in the following year.

She became the director of the Museo Nacional de Etnografía y Folklore in La Paz. She was sacked in June 2020 by the Brazilian provisional government despite international protest.

In 2020 she was awarded the Goethe Medal alongside pro-European English writer Ian McEwan and Zukiswa Wanner. Wanner was the first African woman to win the award. Ayca was chosen because of the cross cultural exchange she encourages between Europe and South America. The German commission who awarded the medal called her a "true bridge builder".
