= Lives of Great Men =

2017 memoir by Chike Frankie Edozien

Lives of Great Men: Living and Loving as an African Gay Man
- Author: Chike Frankie Edozien
- Language: English
- Genre: Memoir
- Publisher: Team Angelica Publishing
- Publication date: 24 November 2017
- Publication place: Nigeria
- Media type: Print, e-book
- Pages: 254
- ISBN: 9780995516236

Lives of Great Men: Living and Loving as an African Gay Man is a 2017 memoir by Nigerian-American journalist and writer Chike Frankie Edozien. Combining autobiography, travel writing, and oral history, the book documents the experiences of gay Africans in Nigeria and across the African diaspora, drawing on the author's personal experiences and encounters with LGBTQ individuals in several African countries. The memoir has been described as the first published memoir by a Nigerian gay man and one of the earliest book-length accounts of LGBTQ life written by a Nigerian author.

== Reception ==
Writing for Salon, Rachel Leah described the book as a rare account documenting same-sex relationships and LGBTQ communities across Africa, noting its contribution to discussions of sexuality and human rights on the continent.

The book won the Lambda Literary Award for Gay Memoir or Biography in 2018 and was nominated for the Randy Shilts Award for Gay Nonfiction by the Publishing Triangle.

The Guardian described Lives of Great Men as the first gay memoir from Nigeria and cited it as part of a growing body of Nigerian LGBTQ literature that expanded the visibility of queer experiences in West Africa.
