= Krystyna Meissner =

Polish theatre director (1933–2022)

- Born: 19 June 1933; Warsaw, Poland
- Died: 20 February 2022 (aged 88)
- Education: University of Warsaw
- Occupation: Theatre director
- Awards: Goethe Medal (2014); Paszport Polityki (1994)

Krystyna Meissner (19 June 1933 – 20 February 2022) was a Polish theatre director. She founded two festivals and her awards include the Goethe Medal. She was recognised for popularising German plays and for introducing theatrical work from Eastern Europe to Western Europe.

== Life ==
Meissner was born in Warsaw in 1933, the daughter of Alfred Meissner, a dental surgeon, Home Army soldier and a doctor in the Warsaw Uprising. She studied Polish at the University of Warsaw before studying Direction at Warsaw's State Academy of Theatre. She rose to be the artistic director of the W. Horzyca Theatre in Toruń where she launched the international festival named Kontakt. In time this festival would see leading German directors debuting their work in Poland including Thomas Ostermeier, Christoph Marthaler and Sasha Waltz.

In 1994, she was the laureate in the theatre category for the Paszport Polityki award in its second year of operation. In 1997, her abilities were recognised when she became the director of Poland's most important theatre, the National Stary Theatre, which was founded in 1781. Her term there was difficult and within a year she left at the request of the actors. At the beginning of 1999, she was in Wrocław working in the "Teatr Współczesny" (contemporary theatre), and organising the "Dialog Theatre festival". In 2000, she directed "Family Situations" by Biljana Srbljanović; the following year she directed "Bulwar Comedy" by Oliver Bukowski. Later plays she directed were by Tadeusz Miciński and Juliusz Słowacki. She was a member of the judging team to find the leading theatre director for the European Theatre Awards which are held annually in Taormina.

== Awards ==
Meissner was awarded the Goethe Medal in 2014, for fostering a strong presence of German theatre in Poland as well as leading the discovery of Eastern European theatre in Western Europe.

She received the Zasłużony Działacz Kultury award, the Knight's Cross of the Order for Merits to Lithuania in 2016 and the Officer's Cross of the Order of Polonia Restituta in 2005. In 2016, she was given the gold medal for Merit to Culture – Gloria Artis.

== Death ==
She died on 20 February 2022, aged 88.
