= Dwight Pattison =

Indian bassist and guitarist

- Born: Kolkata, India
- Died: 16 June 2013 (aged 51) Sikkim, India
- Genres: Rock, jazz
- Occupations: Bassist, guitarist

Dwight Pattison (died 16 June 2013) was an Indian bassist and guitarist born in Kolkata, India.

== Career ==
Dwight Pattison played with High, the rock band in Kolkata fronted by Dilip Balakrishnan and Lew Hilt, where he began song writing. Pattison toured with various bands and musicians, such as Moheener Ghoraguli, Adnan Sami, Lesle Lewis, Gary Lawyer and Krosswindz, with whom he co-created the Bengali-language album "Poth Geche Benke". He was known for his musical timing and talent on various instruments, particularly on the bass and acoustic guitar. He died on 16 June 2013 in Sikkim, India of a heart attack.
