= Peter Skrine =

British Germanist and academic

Peter Norman Skrine (1935 – 26 May 2017) was a British Germanist and academic. A specialist in German literature between the 16th and 20th centuries, he was professor of German at the University of Bristol from 1989 to 2000. After serving in the Royal Navy, Skrine studied at the University of Cambridge and University of Strasbourg. He then taught at the University of Manchester from 1962 to 1989, latterly as head of the German department. His wife, Celia Skrine, is a translator.

== Bibliography ==
- Peter Skrine, Naturalism: The Critical Idiom (London: Methuen, 1971).
- Peter Skrine, The Baroque: Literature and Culture in Seventeenth-century Europe (London: Methuen, 1978)
- Eda Sagarra and Peter Skrine, A Companion to German Literature (Oxford: Blackwell, 1997)
