= Eda Sagarra =

Irish Germanist, writer, academic (born 1933)

- Born: 1933 (age 92–93)
- Occupation: Professor
- Awards: MRIA

Academic work
- Discipline: German studies
- Institutions: Trinity College Dublin

Eda Sagarra, MRIA (née O'Shiel; born 1933) is an Irish Germanist, historian writer and retired academic.

== Career ==
She was professor of German at Trinity College Dublin from 1975 to 1998; she was also pro-chancellor from 1999 to 2008 and remains emeritus professor of German on the faculty.

Sagarra was elected a member of the Royal Irish Academy in 1986 (she was its secretary from 1993 to 1998), and a corresponding member of the Austrian Academy of Sciences in 1998. She was awarded the Goethe Medal in 1990.

== Publications ==
- Eda Sagarra, Tradition and Revolution in Germany: German Literature and Society, 1830–1890 (London: Weidenfeld and Nicolson, 1971).
- Eda Sagarra, A Social History of Germany 1648–1914 (London: Methuen, 1977; 2nd ed., London, 2003).
- Jörg Thunecke and Eda Sagarra (eds), Formen Realistischer Erzählkunst. Festschrift für Charlotte Jolles (Nottingham: Sherwood, 1979).
- Eda Sagarra, An Introduction to Nineteenth Century Germany (Harlow: Longman, 1980).
- Gilbert Carr and Eda Sagarra (eds), Irish Studies in Modern Austrian Literature: Proceedings of the First Irish Symposium in Austrian Studies, Dublin, 19–20 February 1982 (Dublin: Trinity College Dublin, 1983).
- Gilbert Carr and Eda Sagarra (eds), Fin de Siècle Vienna: Second Irish Symposium in Austrian Studies Held at Trinity College, Dublin, 28 February–2 March 1985 (Dublin: Trinity College, 1985).
- Alan Matthews and Eda Sagarra (eds), Austria and Ireland: Economic Performance in Two Small Open Economies: 3rd Trinity Symposium on Austrian Studies (Dublin: Trinity College, 1988).
- Eda Sagarra (ed.), Deutsche Literatur in Sozialgeschichtlicher Perspektive: Ein Dubliner Symposium (Dublin: Trinity College Dublin, 1989).
- Jürgen Barkhoff and Eda Sagarra (eds), Anthropologie und Literatur um 1800, Publications of the Institute of Germanic Studies, vol. 54 (München: iudicium verlag, 1992).
- Eda Sagarra and Peter Skrine, A Companion to German Literature: From 1500 to the Present (Oxford: Blackwell, 1999).
- Paul Leifer and Eda Sagarra (eds), Austrian Literature in Ireland: Austro-Irish Links through the Centuries (Vienna: Diplomatische Akademie, 2002).
- Eda Sagarra, Germany in the Nineteenth Century: History and Literature (New York: Peter Lang, 2002).
- Eda Sagarra, Kevin O'Shiel: Tyrone Nationalist and Irish State Builder (Dublin: Irish Academic Press, 2013).
- Eda Sagarra, Envoy Extraordinary: Professor Smiddy of Cork (Dublin: Institute of Public Administration, 2018).
- Eda Sagarra, Fontane unter Anderem: Essays zur Sozialgeschichte der Deutschen Literatur im 19. Jahrhundert (Würzburg: Könighausen & Neumann, 2021).
- Fiona Murray and Eda Sagarra (eds), The Men and Women of the Anglo-Irish Treaty Negotiations 1921 (Dublin: Laurelmount Press, 2021)
