= Werner Schwab =

Austrian playwright (1958–1994)

Werner Schwab (4 February 1958 – 1 January 1994) was an Austrian playwright and visual artist.

== Biography ==
From 1978 to 1982 he studied sculpture at the Akademie der bildenden Künste in Vienna. During the 1980s he worked as a sculptor and woodcutter.

Schwab was a heavy drinker who was said to have written his plays late at night while listening to loud music (particularly the band Einstürzende Neubauten, with whom he was friends). His body was found on New Year's Day 1994.

== Work ==
Schwab's first play Die Präsidentinnen (sometimes translates as First Ladies or Holy mothers), was produced at the Theater im Künstlerhaus in Vienna in 1990. Between then and his death four years later he wrote sixteen plays, eight of which were produced during his lifetime, making his career one of the briefest, most spectacular and most controversial in contemporary German-language theatre.

Schwab's work is close to the grotesque genre. It extensively employed scatology and sex, with the peculiarity of exhibiting pulsions and taboos in a poetic framework. He renewed the tradition of German Expressionism. His plays are full of images of surreal violence and degradation, and are firmly grounded within a native Austrian tradition of Black comedy. Schwab conceived theater as anti-bourgeois.

He made use of textual collages and intertextuality. His 1995 play Troilluswahn und Cressidatheater is a rewriting of Shakespeare's Troilus and Cressida into the grotesque genre.

Another characteristic of his texts is to exploit the German language's capacity for neologism to a remarkable degree. He is very difficult to translate, but amongst English-language dramatists, certain stylistic parallels might be drawn between his work and that of Steven Berkoff and Enda Walsh. Vera San Payo de Lemos won the Austrian Prize for Literary Translation in 1998 and 2002 for her work in translating his work.

== Awards and honors ==
- 1992 Mülheimer Dramatikerpreis

== Bibliography ==
=== Plays ===
- Die Präsidentinnen. 1990.
- Übergewicht, unwichtig: Unform. Ein europäisches Abendmahl. 1991.
- Volksvernichtung oder meine Leber ist sinnlos. 1991.
- Mein Hundemund. 1992.
- Mesalliance, aber wir ficken uns prächtig. 1992.
- Der Himmel mein Lieb meine sterbende Beute. 1992.
- Offene Gruben und offene Fenster. Ein Fall von Ersprechen. 1992.
- Pornogeographie. Sieben Gerüchte. 1993.
- Endlich tot, endlich keine Luft mehr. 1994.
- Mariedl/Antiklima(x). 1994.
- Faust:: Mein Brustkorb: Mein Helm. 1994.
- Troilluswahn und Cressidatheater. 1995.
- Eskalation ordinär. Ein Schwitzkastenschwank in sieben Affekten. 1995.

=== Novel ===
- Joe Mc Vie alias Josef Thierschädl. 1988 (first published 2007).

=== Books by Werner Schwab ===
- Fäkaliendramen. (Droschl, 1991) ISBN 3-85420-221-0
- Königskomödien. (Droschl, 1992) ISBN 3-85420-289-X
- Dramen III. (Droschl, 1994) ISBN 3-85420-391-8
- Holy Mothers, translation by Meredith Oakes of Die Präsidentinnen (Oberon, 1999) ISBN 1-84002-113-6
- An Anthology of Plays, translated by Michael Mitchell (Ariadne Press, 1999) ISBN 1-57241-064-7
- People Annihilation or my Liver is Sick, translated by Michael Roloff [Ariadne Press] U.S. Premiere, Chicago, Trap Door Theatre, 2005

== Sources ==
- Ulm Sanford, Gerlinde, Afterword to Schwab, An Anthology of Plays (Ariadne, 1999)

== See also ==
- List of Austrian writers
