= Rohini Chowdhury =

Indian children's writer (born 1963)

Rohini Chowdhury (born 1963) is a children's writer and literary translator. Her published writing for children is in both Hindi and English, and includes translations, novels, short stories, and non-fiction. Her children's books and short stories have been shortlisted for awards, including the Hindu Young World Goodbooks Non-fiction Award and the New Writer Prose and Poetry Competition, 2001, UK.

As a literary translator, she works mainly in Hindi (pre-modern and modern) and English. She has translated the 17th century Braj Bhasha text, Ardhakathanak, considered the first autobiography in an Indian language, into modern Hindi and English. Her most recent translation is that of Tulsidas's Ramcharitmanas, which was published by Penguin India in December, 2019. A short extract from the first volume had earlier been published with the permission of the publisher in the journal Modern Poetry in Translation, Songs of the Shattered Throat, 2017, Number 1.

== Biography ==
Chowdhury was born in Calcutta, India, in 1963. After completing her schooling from Loreto House, she joined Jadavpur University in Calcutta, graduating with a BA (Hons) degree in Economics. She then decided to pursue a business degree at the Indian Institute of Management, Ahmedabad, graduating from there in 1986 with a PGDM. After several years in business consulting and strategy, she became a full-time writer. In 1997, she moved to London, where she lives with her two daughters.

== Published works ==
Chowdhury has published the following literary translations:

- Ardhakathanak, by Banarasidas, Penguin Books, 2007
- Ardhakathanak (A Half Story), by Banarasidas; Preface by Rupert Snell; Penguin Books, 2009
- Tyagpatra (The Resignation), by Jainendra; Afterword by Mridula Garg; Penguin Books, 2012
- My Favourite Stories: Bosky’s Panchatantra, by Gulzar; Red Turtle Books, Rupa Publications, India, June 2013
- Chandrakanta, by Devaki Nandan Khatri; Rupa Publications, India, 2015
- Panchatantra, by Vishnusharma; Puffin India, 2017
- The Ramcharitmanas, by Tulsidas; Penguin Books, 2019 (in three volumes)
- Tales from the Kathasaritsagara, by Somadeva; Puffin India, 2019

She has also published the following children's books:

- Meera's First Day in School; English Edition Publishers, 2002
- Meera and Meena go to the Zoo; English Edition Publishers, 2002
- Meera Gets Lost; English Edition Publishers, 2002
- Meera Goes Shopping; English Edition Publishers, 2002
- Meera and the Surprise Pet; English Edition Publishers, 2002
- Rohini's Book of Meera Stories; English Edition Publishers, 2002 (Omnibus volume, with stories 1 to 6)
- Hari's Train Journey; English Edition Publishers, 2002
- Hari is Bored; Amazon Kindle, 2004
- Meera at the Puppet Show; Amazon Kindle, 2004
- A Very Special Birthday; Amazon Kindle, 2004
- Meera Goes Swimming; Amazon Kindle, 2004
- Meera Goes to the Dentist; Amazon Kindle, 2004
- Meena Goes Away; Amazon Kindle, 2004
- The Crow and the Eagle, illustrated by Taposhi Ghoshal; Scholastic India, 2006
- The Frog and the Ox, illustrated by Sonal Panse; Scholastic India, 2006
- The Foolish Crow, illustrated by Neeta Gangopadhyaya; Scholastic India, 2006
- The Donkey and the Load of Salt, illustrated by Shilpa Ranade; Scholastic India, 2006
- Aesop's Fables; Scholastic India, 2007 (Omnibus volume)
- कौआ चला चील बनने, चित्रांकन तापोशी घोशाल; Scholastic India, 2006
- मेंढक और बैल की कहानी, चित्रांकन सोनल पानसे, Scholastic India, 2006
- मूर्ख कौआ, चित्रांकन नीता गंगोपाध्याय, Scholastic India, 2006
- फेरीवाले का गधा, चित्रांकन शिल्पा रानडे, Scholastic India, 2006
- White Tiger; Puffin, Penguin Books India, 2006
- Gautam Buddha: The Lord of Wisdom; Puffin Lives, Penguin Books India, 2011
- Mathemagic Book 1: Numbers, Numbers Everywhere; Puffin, Penguin Books India, 2012
- Mathemagic Book 2: The Most Powerful Number of Them All; Puffin, Penguin Books India, 2013
- The Garden of the Djinn; Rupa Publications, India, 2013
- Verghese Kurien: The Milkman of India; Scholastic Great Lives, Scholastic India, 2014
- Sachin Tendulkar: The Little Master; Scholastic Great Lives, Scholastic India, 2015

She has co-edited the following anthology of short stories with South African writer, Zukiswa Wanner:

- Behind The Shadows: Contemporary Stories from Africa and Asia, 2012

Film script

- Granny’s Monster Machines, April 2013, a bilingual Bengali-English film, created in association with Pop Up Festival of Stories and Chocolate Films. The film is available on Youtube.
