= Chetana Nagavajara =

Thai academic administrator (born 1937)

- Born: 19 July 1937 (age 89); Bangkok, Thailand
- Occupation: Academic
- Awards: Goethe Medal (1973); Narathip Award (2017)

Academic background
- Education: Chulalongkorn University (1st year); Cambridge University (B.A.); University of Tübingen (Dr.phil.)
- Thesis: August Wilhelm Schlegel in Frankreich. Sein Anteil an der französischen Literaturkritik 1807–1835 (1965)
- Doctoral advisor: Kurt Wais

Academic work
- Institutions: Silpakorn University

Chetana Nagavajara (Thai: เจตนา นาควัชระ RTGS: Chettana Nakwatchara; born 19 July 1937) is a Thai scholar and Professor Emeritus of German language at Silpakorn University. He has made contributions to academia, literary criticism, and higher education policy in Thailand.

At Silpakorn University, Nagavajara served as Dean of the Faculty of Arts from 1976 to 1979 and as Vice President from 1979 to 1981. Outside the university system, he participated in formulating national higher education policies by holding series of government-appointed roles.

His field of study includes comparative literature, German literature, and literary criticism. Writing in Thai, English, and German, he has made a significant quantity of work accessible to scholars as well as to the general reading public. His work has been recognized with awards including the Goethe Medal, the Humboldt Research Award, and the Narathip Award, as well as honorary doctorates from five Thai universities and the University of Tübingen in Germany.

Through his scholarly contributions and public engagements, Nagavajara is a leading figure in advancing the study and practice of arts criticism in Thailand. His academic exchanges in the United States and Germany, supported by various grants, have contributed to connecting Western and Thai intellectual traditions.

== Life and academic career ==
=== Personal life ===
Chetana Nagavajara spent his early years in the former Phra Nakhon province (now part of Bangkok), east of the Chao Phraya river (Thai: แม่น้ำเจ้าพระยา, RTGS: Maenam Chao Phraya). He grew up near the Victory Monument (Bangkok) (Thai: อนุสาวรีย์ชัยสมรภูมิ, RTGS: Anusawari Chai Samoraphum), as the youngest of the six siblings. Both of his parents, school teachers by profession, instilled in him a deep appreciation for learning and culture. His father, Thanom (Thai: ถนอม), also known as Khun Chamnikhabuansat (Thai: ขุนชำนิขบวนศาส์น), served as the principal of Bophit Phimuk School. He was influential in founding a Thai classical band at Khurusapha and also taught Western classical music. Nagavajara commuted daily along Phaya Thai road on his bicycle, and showed enthusiasm for music and sports, which attached him to the community.

Nagavajara cycled every day as a child to Phaya Thai Road. His early life was marked by an enthusiasm for music, learning, and sports as a kid. His love for music was promoted by his father, his English proficiency was developed by his mother, and his oral literature knowledge was provided by his grandmother. He also participated in singing contests at temple fairs, demonstrating his passion for music and performance since childhood.

Nagavajara is married to Tasanee Nagavajara, a professor of French at Chulalongkorn University. They together have three children: Tasana, a violinist and faculty member of the faculty of music, Silpakorn University; a daughter who holds an executive position at an American research corporation; and another daughter who owns a restaurant in Mexico.

=== Education background ===
Chetana Nagavajara received his early education at Debsirin School, a boys' school in Bangkok, where he studied for eight years and graduated in 1954. He later credited his experiences at Debsirin as formative to his academic development and core values. During his final year, he achieved the highest score in the national matriculation examination for arts students.

Nagavajara continued his higher education studies at the Faculty of Arts, Chulalongkorn University.His academic performance earned him a Thai Government Scholarship to pursue further education in the United Kingdom. He spent three years in Manchester, studying German and Latin language and literature in addition to his main coursework.

He later attended Cambridge University, where he completed a Bachelor of Arts with Honours in Modern Languages. In 1961, he ventured to Germany to study comparative literature under Kurt Wais, culminating in the award of a Dr.phil. (magna cum laude) in Comparative Literature from the University of Tübingen in 1965.

=== Ministry of education and Silpakorn University ===
n 1968, Chetana Nagavajara began his career in Ministry of Education. Later that year, he joined the newly established Sanam Chandra Palace campus of Silpakorn University in Nakhon Pathom, beginning his long association with the institution.

As one of the founding faculty members at the campus, Nagavajara played a central role in establishing the German Department. laying the foundation for the department's academic pursuits and contributions. His academic work extended beyond Silpakorn University through his appointment as deputy director of the Southeast Asian Ministers of Education Secretariat (SEAMEO Secretariat) under the Southeast Asian Ministers of Education Organization (SEAMEO) Secretariat, where he served for four years. During his tenure, he was awarded the Goethe Medal in 1972. In his final two years at SEMEO, he served as a deputy director of SEMEO's secretariat office.

Returning to Silpakorn University in 1976, Nagavajara became the Dean of the Faculty of Arts, Silpakorn University, a position he held until 1979. He then served as Vice President for Academic Affairs and Development Planning from 1979 to 1981. During his time as Vice President, he supported the establishment of the social studies division within the faculty. In 1983, he was promoted to full professor in recognition of his academic contributions.

Nagavajara's academic pursuits transcended internationally. He was a visiting scholar at the University of Michigan-Ann Arbor in 1985 and 1992, and served as a Fulbright Visiting Professor at the University of California, Berkeley during the 1989–1990 academic year. His research activities in Germany were supported by the Deutscher Akademischer Austauschdienst (DAAD), and he received the Humboldt Research Award (Humboldt-Forschungspreis) from the Alexander von Humboldt Foundation.

=== Retirement ===
On 30 September 1997, Chetana Nagavajara retired from public service as a senior professor (level 11), the highest attainable rank for a civil servant in Thailand (Thai: ข้าราชการ, RTGS: Karatchakan). In a 1998 interview with the Bangkok Post, he stated that his decision to remain a civil servant was motivated not by personal preference, but by deep sense of gratitude toward the Thai government for the scholarship that had supported his education in Europe. He emphasized to younger scholarship recipients that while scholarships can be formally repaid, the debt to taxpayers who finance education is enduring, quoting a Thai proverb: "Scholarships may be repaid but gratitude is inexhaustible." (Thai: ทุนนั้นใช้หมด แต่บุญคุณใช้ไม่หมด, RTGS: Thunnanchaimot Tae Bunkhunnanchaimaimot).

Despite his official retirement from full-time public service, Nagavajara remained active in academia, participating in government commissions, university councils, and leading research projects. Silpakorn University honored his enduring legacy by appointing him Emeritus Professor of Germannd established a memorial in his honor at the Sanam Chandra Palace Library, where the books he donated are housed. Throughout this period, he continued to receive honorary doctorates and other awards recognizing his contributions to education and scholarship.

== German and comparative literature ==
Chetana Nagavajara's scholarly work has focused on German literature, comparative literature, and translation. He has published extensively in Thai, English, and German, producing research monographs, translations, and handbooks for students. His expertise in multiple languages, including German, French, and English, has enabled him to integrate Eastern and Western literary traditions in his publications.

His contributions were recognized early with prestigious accolades, notably with the Goethe Medal in 1973, awarded during his tenure at the Southeast Asian Ministers of Education Organization (SEAMEO). In 1995, he received the inaugural Senior Research Scholar grant from the Thailand Research Fund for project "Poetry as Intellectual and Spiritual Force in Contemporary Society: Experiences from Thai, British-Irish, American, French, and German Literature". This project helped catalyze a number of Thai arts and criticism initiatives in subsequent years.

Nagavajara's doctoral dissertation, completed in 1965, examined August Wilhelm Schlegel's role in French literary criticism from 1807 to 1835. It was published as his first book in German by Max Niemeyer in 1966. he monograph was praised for its balanced mediation between French and German literary traditions, and was later cited by Roger Paulin alongside other sources, in the biography of Schlegel. His subsequent publications include "Brecht and France," (1993), released by Peter Lang in English, as well as works on Goethe, Mann and contemporary German poetry in Thai.

In addition to his original scholarship, Nagavajara translated over 50 poems from German into Thai. Notable examples include "Geschrieben" by Werner Lutz, "Ein Tag für Impressionisten" by Rainer Malkowski and "Der Aufruf" by Friederike Mayröcker.

His English- and German-language works also explored transcultural exchange between Thailand and Western countries. Collections such as "Comparative literature from a Thai perspective. Collected articles 1978–1992", "Fervently Mediating: Criticism from a Thai Perspective, Collected Articles 1982–2004" and "Bridging Cultural Divides: Collected Essays and Reviews 2006–2014" garnered praise for their humanistic approach and insights into intercultural communication.

Reviewers highlighted Nagavajara's incorporation of Thai cultural theory, particularly his use of the "Tritsadi Ranat Thum" (Thai: ทฤษฎีระนาดทุ้ม, directly translated as "bass xylophone theory"). Drawing from Thai classical music, Nagavajara proposed that true leadership resembles the role of the bass xylophone(Thai: ระนาดทุ้ม, RTGS: Ranat Thum) rather than the more prominent treble xylophone (Thai: ระนาดเอก, RTGS: Ranat Ek). In a Pi Phat Khrueng Khu ensemble (Thai: วงปี่พาทย์เครื่องคู่), the treble xylophone dominates the melody, while the bass xylophone, though less conspicuous, controls the tempo and cohesion of the performance. By analogy, Nagavajara argued that effective leaders operate quietly but decisively beneath the surface. He also emphasized the importance of oral tradition (Thai: มุขปาฐะ, RTGS: Mukkhapatha) and improvisation (Thai: การด้น, RTGS: Kan Don) in both leadership and the humanities.

== Thai arts and criticism projects ==
As a researcher and project leader, Chetana Nagavajara initiated two major research projects: "Poetry as a Spiritual and Intellectual Force in Contemporary Society" (1995–1998) and "Criticism as an Intellectual Force in Contemporary Society" (1999–2005). Under his leadership, Thai arts criticism research projects expanded to encompass literary criticism, art criticism, theatre criticism and music criticism. After the conclusion of initial Thailand Research Fund grants (1999–2001 and 2002–2005), the projects continued under new leadership, with Nagavajara remaining involved as a senior advisor until the final TRF-funded project ended in 2020. And later projects were supported by Kasikornbank (Thai: ธนาคารกสิกรไทย, RTGS: Thanakhan Kasikon Thai) during 2021–2022.

Subjects of criticism included leading Thai writers such as Chart Korbjitti, Angkarn Kalayanapong, Sri Burapha, Atsiri Thammachot, The Suntharaphon Band, Bangkok Symphony Orchestra, Thailand Philharmonic Orchestra. Visiting foreign orchestras and soloists were also reviewed. In addition, Nagavajara and his team analyzed translated stage productions, including Bertolt Brecht's Der gute Mensch von Sezuan (The Good Person of Szechwan) and Jean Anouilh's Antigone (อันตราคนี or Antrakani in Thai). Some of these criticism works in this area are published on the Thailand Research Fund Criticism Project .

Nagavajara's significant notions in arts and criticism include:

- "One art lights the way for another" (Thai: ศิลปะส่องทางให้แก่กัน), an idea originally from Wetzel, a comparative literature scholar. Nagavajara applied this concept to Thai society and the arts, emphasizing that different branches of art support and inspire one another.
- "The role of amateurs in advancing the arts," highlighting the importance of audience participation and amateur artists in sustaining the arts. He argued that the boundary between professional artists, amateurs, and audiences is thin and fluid.
- "Technology and product manufacturing deplete the value of art," criticizing how rising fees for star performers strain larger ensembles financially, and how high-fidelity (Hi-Fi) technology promotes unrealistic standards of perfection, influencing composers to prioritize technological demands over artistic integrity.

== Humanities education and Thai higher education ==
Nagavajara writes extensively about humanities education and higher education in Thailand. His first book on a humanities theme "For survival of the humanities" was published in 1989 and sequels to the first, "Humanities in crisis: a Thai case study" and "Standpoint of humanities" were published in 1995 and 2015 respectively from collection of his essays. For higher education in general, he published essays in a book "Papers on Education" as early as 1981 and continues to present his views and ideas on higher education for decades. His lecture "From (Selfless) Giving to Commodification: The Dilemma of Higher Education" (2013) and "Cultural Consciousness: the Foundation of Thai Higher Education" (2016) given at the workshops "Deans for Change" were published as books by the Knowledge Network Institute of Thailand (KNIT) and were later included in two of his other books.

In addition to his roles as deputy director of the SEAMEO Secretariat, Dean of Faculty of Arts, Vice President of Silpakorn University, Nagavajara is a former member of the University Council at Ubon Ratchathani University (1993–2003), Prince of Songkla University (2008–2012) and Mahidol University (2008–2016). He was a member of the Governing Board of Ministry of State University Affairs (Thai: กรรมการทบวงมหาวิทยาลัย, RTGS: Kammakan Thabuang Mahawitthayalia) for more than a decade (1987–1990, 1992–2002). As Thai higher education making a transition into autonomous universities, the board was changed into Civil Servant Commission in Higher Education Institutions (Thai: กรรมการข้าราชการพลเรือนในสถาบันอุดมศึกษา, RTGS: Kammakan Kharatchakanphonlaruean Nai Sathaban Udomsueksa) and he continued to serve as a member (2005–2009). These appointments to high-profile public positions were royally endorsed by the King and published in the Government Gazette of Thailand.

Alongside his mentors Kurt Wais and Eberhard Lämmert, Nagavajara played a pivotal role in realizing the collegiate system's educational ideal, conceived by ML Pin Malakul, former Minister of Education and former President of Silpakorn University, alongside his young colleagues.

Nagavajara chaired a working group in the field of humanities and social studies, and fine arts at Mahidol University that produced a manual recognizing 22 types of academic products in humanities, social science and the arts for the purpose of academic promotion. Released in 2011, the manual provides details and clarity for the interpretation of the Thai Ministry of Education rules for academic promotion of tertiary instructors which were nationally standardized and enacted for the first time in 2007.

== Influences ==
Nagavajara was profoundly influenced by renowned figures in the arts and literary criticism domain, including Charles Baudelaire, Bertolt Brecht, Albert Camus, Neville Cardus, Reinhold Grimm, Alexander von Humboldt, F. R. Leavis, Ekavidya Nathalang, Ronald Peacock, Soedjono Djoened Poesponegoro, Friedrich Schiller, Oskar Walzel, René Wellek. Throughout his career, Nagavajara had also created impacts and influenced others in his fields too.

=== Well-known notions ===
Nagavajara introduced the term "culture of criticizing", which has been used as a reference among students, scholars, and others. Societies that are aware of problems and issues would create a "Culture of criticizing", which means that the members of that society support sharing opinions openly and rationally. In the sense that culture is a way of life, a culture of criticizing is the way of life of people who are willing to give and take criticism to make things better. Nagavajara has wide experience being inside the art and literature criticizing circle for multiple decades since 1998. Bangkok Post mentioned Chetana as "...The criticizer who writes sharply, his opinions could make screen writers review their works again despite being in the middle of the show and selling like hot cakes. And visual artists also pay good attention to what he comments..." Moreover, Chetana was also a directional committee for the project 100 great books Thai people should read by Witayakorn Chiengkul

=== Recognition from art and academic society ===
The life and works of Nagavajara were studied in the research project "Thai thinker-researcher: Chetana Nakavajara", which was supported by the Thailand Research Funds in 1998. According to the project, Nagavajara's ideology is built upon a foundation of humanism combined with free-democracy, and fuses ideas from western and eastern culture. His publications, written in both German and English, have been recognized by international academic scholars, including academics from other disciplines. For instance, Professor Wanchai De-Eknamkul who was awarded Humboldt-Forschungspreis said: "Professor Nagavajara's dedication resembles that of a general in the field of Humanities and Social Sciences, able to stand firm against the scientific field with great honor. Currently, I greatly appreciate the valuable knowledge imparted by him." Academics and artists who have been influenced by Chetana Nagavajara include Korakoch Attaviriyanupap, Chamaiporn Bangkombang, Sodchuen Chaiprasathna, Kanya Charoensupkul, Duangmon Chitchamnong, Parichart Chuengwiwattanaporn, Khumron Khunadilok, Suntariya Muanpawong, Pradit Prasartthong, Ratsami Chusongdet, Siraporn Na Klang, and Sukanya Sompaiboon.

=== Children's Novel ===
Nagavajara's role in the series of TRF-funded criticism projects inspired an award-winning children novel Khun Pu Waen Ta To (Thai: คุณปู่แว่นตาโต , 2001) by Chamaiporn Bangkombang, a 2014 national artist of Thailand in literature. The grandfather in the story was modeled after him and the children in the story represented team members of the research project. The sequel to the novel Khun Pu Waen Ta Taek (Thai: คุณปู่แว่นตาแตก ,2011) by the same author also featured him as the main character with a new batch of primary level students. The adventures of a grandfather and children in field trips to Wat Pho, National Gallery, Bang Lamphu, Amphawa and Spirit Cave at Pang Mapha and attempts to instill appreciation of the arts and their native roots were the main themes in the two books. Frequent reference to Siam Devadhiraj by the grandfather to express his frustration and various remarks on grandfather's connections to Germany in the two books were inspired by unique characters of Nagavajara.

=== Arguments and controversies ===
In August 1998, during the last seminar in the series for this TRF-funded project, poets took an exception to what he presented as "representative Thai poetry" which include lyrics from modern pop songs by Seksan Sukpimai, or commonly known as Sek Loso, but not highly-regarded modern classics. In his interview with the Bangkok Post, he explained that "The protest by the poets at last August's seminar was brief, and had to do with a misunderstanding concerning the concept of value in poetry."

== Awards and honors ==
=== Honorary degree ===
He received honorary doctorates from Prince of Songkla University in 1998, Srinakharinwirot University in 2001, Chulalongkorn University in 2004, Mae Fah Luang University in 2005, Chiang Mai University in 2006 and University of Tübingen in 2009. Granting a second doctorate to the same person in this way was unprecedented at the University of Tübingen and his case has set precedent.

=== Academic societies ===
- 2004: Honorary Member of the Siam Society
- 1999–2002: Vice President of International Federation for Modern Languages and Literatures
- 1982–1988 Member of the Literary Theory Committee of the International Comparative Literature Association (ICLA)

=== Awards ===
- 2019: Lifetime Achievement Award, the Thai Chapter of the International Association of Theatre Critics
- 2017: Narathip Bongprabandh Award
- 2009: Award for Distinguished Authority on the Thai Language, Ministry of Culture, Thailand
- 1995: Inaugural TRF Senior Research Scholar
- 1994: Alexander von Humboldt Foundation's Humboldt-Forschungspreis award
- 1984, 1992: Fulbright Visiting Scholar at University of Michigan-Ann Arbor (twice)
- 1989–90: Fulbright Visiting Professor at University of California, Berkeley
- 1973: Goethe Medal

=== Decorations ===
Thailand

- 1994: Knight Grand Cordon (Special Class) of the Most Exalted Order of the White Elephant
- 1992: Chakrabarti Mala Medal
- 1990: Knight Grand Cordon (Special Class) of Order of the Crown of Thailand

Germany

- 1996: Grand Cross 1st Class Order of Merit of the Federal Republic of Germany

France

- 2003: Chevalier of the Ordre des Arts et des Lettres

== Academic works ==
Language and Literature

- Basic theory of Literature (1977)
- The Drama Literature of Bertolt Brecht (1983)
- Comparative literature from a Thai perspective: Collected articles (1978–1992)
- Wechselseitige Erhellung der Kulturen: Aufsätze zur Kultur und Literatur (1999)
- Study of Criticize: International Poetry (2003)
- Native roots and distant climes (2020)

Thai Art and Criticism

- The Path to the Culture of Criticism (1981)
- The Endless Path of the Culture of Criticism: Collected Critiques (1987)
- I enrolled because of Love: Collected Critiques on Thai and Western Music (1997)
- The Arts of Illuminating: Collected Academic Articles (2003)
- Fervently mediating: Criticism from a Thai perspective. Collected articles (2004)
- The Moderate Way of Criticism (2012)
- The Outcome of Research come with Criticism (2020)

Humanities and Higher education

- For survival of the humanities (1989)
- Old school VS New school: Thai Humanities in Correlation to Change (2005)
- From (Selfless) Giving to Commodification: The Dilemma of Higher Education (2013)
- The Standpoint of Humanities (2015)
- Conversations with Prof. Chettana Nagavajara on Leadership (2015)
- Cultural Consciousness: the Foundation of Thai Higher Education (2016)
- The liberating force of Vidya Dana: Collected essays and reviews 2001–2026 (2026)
