= Naveen Kishore =

Indian writer and theatre practitioner

Naveen Kishor
- নবীন কিশোর
- Born: 17 January 1953 (age 73); Kolkata, India
- Occupations: Writer, theatre practitioner
- Writing career
- Notable awards: Goethe Medal

Naveen Kishore is an Indian writer and theatre practitioner. In 1982 he founded Seagull Books publication in Kolkata.

== Early life ==
Kishore, born in Kolkata on 17 January 1953, earned a Bachelor of Arts in English Literature in 1973 before starting his career as a theater lighting designer. In 1982, he established Seagull Books an independent publisher of world literature for publishing program centered on drama, film, art, It is also renowned for publishing Indian film scripts by director Satyajit Ray and Mrinal Sen, and plays by Indian playwrights in translations. Naveen began in theater as an assistant props person for Red Curtain's production "Wait Until Dark". He later worked in advertising and organising concerts with artists like Begum Akhtar and Birju Maharaj.

== Awards ==
Kishore has received several accolades, including:

- Goethe Medal in 2013.
- Words Without Borders Ottoway Award for promoting international literature in 2021.
