= Claudia Andujar =

Brazilian photographer

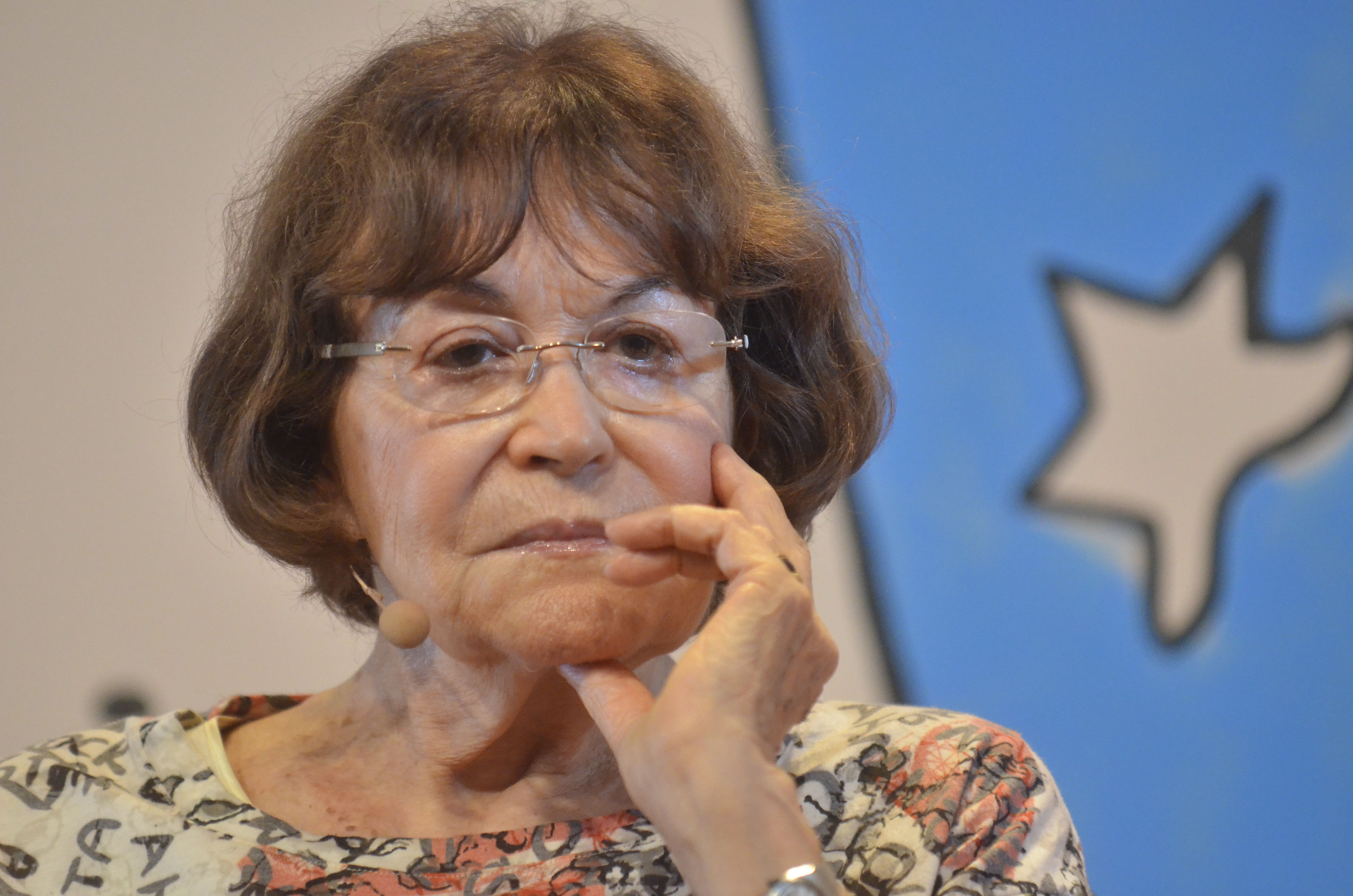
- Born: Claudine Haas; 1931 (age 94–95); Neuchâtel, Switzerland
- Education: Hunter College
- Occupations: photographer and activist
- Spouses: Julio Andujar (m. 1949) George Love (m. 1967)
- Awards: Cultural Freedom Prize – Lannan Literary Awards; 2000 Grand Cross – Ordem do Mérito Cultural; 2008 Goethe Medal; 2018

Claudia Andujar (born 1931) is a Brazilian photographer and activist. She co-founded the Comissão Pró-Yanomami (CCPY), an advocacy organization that supports the rights of the Yanomami people. Her work is held in the collection of the Museum of Modern Art in New York and Tate in the UK.

== Early life and education ==
The daughter of a Hungarian Jewish father (Siegfried Haas) and a Swiss mother (Germaine Guye Haas), she was born Claudine Haas in Neuchâtel, Switzerland. She grew up in the city of Oradea, which changed hands between the kingdoms of Hungary and Romania. Towards the end of World War II, she and her mother took refuge in Switzerland. Her father died in the Dachau concentration camp, and the rest of her father's family died either at Dachau or Auschwitz.

She studied humanities at Hunter College in New York City. There she met a Spanish refugee, Julio Andujar, whom she married in 1949 and whose last name she still maintains because she wanted "to forget everything that happened" and "start anew." Andujar moved to Brazil in 1956 to stay with her mother, Germaine Guye Haas. In 1976, she was naturalised as Brazilian.

== Career ==
A project on the Karajá people in central Brazil led her to a career in photojournalism. Her work has appeared in various magazines, including Life, Look, Fortune, Aperture, Realidade and Claudia.

She has documented the culture of the Yanomami people over the years, including a book Yanomami: The House, The Forest, The Invisible published in 1998. The Yanomami had had little contact with the outside world. When a highway project through their territory led to a disastrous outbreak of measles, she suspended her photographic work to help bring medical aid to them.

In 1977, Brazil's military regime expelled her from the region after she denounced the appropriation of indigenous lands by settlers. During the 1980s, an influx of illegal gold miners into this region led to more health problems, including an outbreak of malaria and mercury poisoning. Twenty per cent of the Yanomami population died as a result. Andujar played an important role in establishing the Commission for the Creation of the Yanomami Park which led to the Brazilian government establishing a 96,000 km^{2} protected area for use by the Yanomami.

A gallery of the Inhotim museum in Brumadinho was built to display her work.

== Awards ==
- 1971: Guggenheim Fellowship from the John Simon Guggenheim Memorial Foundation, New York
- 1977: Guggenheim Fellowship from the John Simon Guggenheim Memorial Foundation, New York
- 2000: Cultural Freedom Prize, Lannan Literary Awards, for her work in portraying and aiding the Yanomani people
- 2008: Grand Cross, Ordem do Mérito Cultural, Brazil
- 2018: Goethe Medal, Goethe-Institut, for her work with the Yanomami people

== Collections ==
Andujar's work is held in the following permanent collections:

- Eastman House, Rochester, New York: 1 print (as of 18 December 2024)
- Museum of Fine Arts, Houston: 2 prints (as of 18 December 2024)
- Museum of Modern Art, New York City: 109 prints (as of 18 December 2024)
- Tate, UK: 22 prints (as of 19 December 2024)
