= National Theatre Company of Mexico =

The National Theatre Company of Mexico (Spanish: Compañía Nacional de Teatro) was established in 1977 in Mexico City to promote the theater arts on a national scale. The company was restructured in 2008 and had since been headed by director Luis de Tavira until 2017, when they chose Enrique Singer to take his place to direct the permanent cast of about forty members. The company promotes the theater tradition in general as well as Mexican playwriting and staging, performing classic and new works, as it performs nearly year round in various parts of the country.

== History ==
The theater company was founded in 1977, with the purpose of promoting the theater arts in Mexico. Despite producing a number of notable playwrights and a large number of plays, 90% of Mexico's population has never seen a live play. The home of the company is on Francisco Sosa, Barrio de Santa Catarina, in the Coyoacán borough of the capital.

The company was restructured in 2008 by artistic director Luis de Tavira. One main aspect of this restructuring was the creation of "artists-in-residence" positions to allow the organization to have a permanent cast, which can dedicate itself to the company full-time. These positions are two-year contracts which are renewable, and funded by Fondo Nacional para la Cultura y las Artes (Fonca). The process of creating the first permanent cast of the company was through a casting call. The creation of the cast was considered essential to creating improving the theatre company for training and to give the resident artists time to develop new and interdisciplinary projects. The offer was initially for forty fully funded slots with numbers set aside for certain age groups and profession, which includes set designers, lighting, costume and makeup.

== Composition of current company ==
Today, it is an association of artists, workers, promoters and fans of the theater arts. Its mission has three parts: the preservation of theater heritage in general, Mexican theater in particular and the promotion of new plays. The main acting crew consists of forty people, with about five species for "actors emeritus" for teaching purposes. Some of the actors who have worked with the company since 2008 are Luis Rabago, Julieta Egurrola, Luisa Huertas, Mercedes Pascual, Diego Jáuregui, Roberto Soto and Arturo Beristáin. The company also has thirteen writers, six playwrights, ten music composers, twelve scene directors, eight stage technicians, nine lighting designers, ten costume designers, a musical director, an orchestra director and three sopranos, along with thirty three actors. The company reorganizes every two years, rotating at least thirty percent of its personnel including management staff. It has a budget of approximately eighteen million pesos per year, with governmental as well as private support. It has agreements with international institutions such as that with the Ministry of Culture in Spain, with includes co-productions.

== Performances ==
The restructuring not only resulted in new actors, but also a new repertoire which mix classic Mexican, international and contemporary works. Since 2008, the company has performed seventeen major plays, including Pascua by Swedish playwright August Strindberg. Twelve of these works were performed in 2010 alone. Other works in its repertory include Ni el sol ni la muerte pueden mirarse de frente (2009), Edip en Colofón (2009), Ser es ser visto (2009), Egmont (2009), Horas de gracia (2010), Zoot Suit (2010), The Misunderstanding (2010), Natán el sabio (2010) y Endgame (2010). Ni el sol ni la muerte pueden mirarse de frente, by French-Lebanese playwright Wajdi Mouawad, was guest-directed by Colombian-Swiss director Rolf Abderhalden. Ser es ser visto involves all of the company's cast of about forty and is the product of an internal workshops started in 2008. Egmont is a work by Johann Wolfgang von Goethe adapted by Juan Villoro. The Misunderstanding was added in 2010 on the 50th anniversary of the author's death. Other pieces created and/or performed by the company include those by Mexican writers Mario Espinasa and Flavio González Melo. In 2010, new works were presented such as El Trueno Dorado, El Jardín de los Cerezos, Entre guerrasand two works about the Mexican Revolution, due to the Centennial of this event. These are called El día más violento and Soles sin sombra.

The company performs nearly year-round and travels in most parts of Mexico. In 2011, the company has toured states such as Chihuahua, Zacatecas and Guanajuato mainly presenting Desazón and Zoot Suit. For the Festival Internacional Cervantino, the company presented a work called Islamic Nights by Héctor Mendoza.

In 2012 the National Theatre Company of Mexico contributed productions to the World Shakespeare Festival and Globe to Globe Festival, which are part of the London 2012 Cultural Olympiad.
