= Rolf Abderhalden =

Colombian artist and theatre director (born 1965)

Rolf Abderhalden Cortés (born 1965) is a Colombian artist and theatre director. He was born in Manizales. He studied and practised the visual arts, before expanding quickly into other areas, notably theatre and set design. His work till date encompasses performance, installation, video installation, etc. and has been presented at unconventional spaces across Europe and America.

He and his elder sister Heidi Abderhalden co-founded Mapa Teatro in Paris in 1984, before moving it to Bogotá in 1986. His sister Elizabeth remained in Paris but she continued to be the theatre's costume designer. It is now known as one of the leading artistic companies in Colombia. Abderhalden also runs an arts studio at the Biblioteca Luís Ángel Arango, and since 1986 has taught at the Universidad Nacional de Colombia.

In 2018 he and his sister Heidi were awarded the Goethe Medal for their work in breaking down cultural barriers.
