= Elma Shaw =

Liberian author and publisher

- Citizenship: Liberia
- Education: American University
- Occupations: Author; publisher
- Writing career
- Notable work: Redemption Road (2008)

Elma Shaw is a Liberian author. She is best known for the novel Redemption Road: The Quest for Peace and Justice in Liberia (2008), set in Monrovia during the presidency of Charles Taylor. In 2008, she also established the Cotton Tree Press publishing firm.

== Early life and education ==
Shaw was born in Liberia. Her family moved to England when she was 5 and returned to Liberia in 1979 when she was in year 9.

Shaw obtained a bachelor's degree in communication media from the American University.

== Career ==
Shaw has written for Liberia Travel & Life Magazine, Pambazuka News and UNMIL Focus.

In 2008, she established Cotton Tree Press to self-publish her first novel Redemption Road as well as to publish books by other black authors. The book was a national bestseller. The same year, Jonathan Stack produced a documentary based on the book, which premiered at the International Documentary Film Festival Amsterdam in 2008.

Shaw also edited Monrovia Rain and Other Stories Lost and Found, an anthology of short stories and contributed to Big Belly Business, a pregnancy guide for Liberian women.

In 2025, the West African Examinations Council added Redemption Road to its list of recommended English literature texts for the West African Senior School Certificate Examination (WASSCE) for 2026–2030. In 2026, students in Ghana, Liberia, Nigeria, Sierra Leone and The Gambia were expected to study the novel for school leaving exams.

The book is also an English Literature text at the University of Liberia and Stella Maris Polytechnic.

== Critical reception ==
Of her book Redemption Road, Stefanie Sevcik, writing in the Journal of the African Literature Association, said: "In the context of the Liberian civil wars, women's bodies played very prominent, ambivalent roles... Shaw successfully highlights this web of ambivalence through her protagonist Bendu Lewis... Shaw's novel proposes an alternative path to redemption for Liberian women [and] contributes to an international legacy of thinking about literature as a creative, productive venue to explore national identity and political action".

Soyemi Philip, writing in the International Journal of Research and Scientific Innovation, considered the stylistic elements of the novel. He noted that "the point of view used [...] is essentially omniscient, as the narrator is a distant non-character [... Shaw] also incorporates epistolary form... Two of the characters... write letters... designed for therapeutic functions [...] It is through these letters that we learn of some gaps about the lives of the writers". He also notes that "A few of the characters in the novel are positioned symbolically... of certain values in the novel. Calvin represents the older order of Americo-Liberians,.. hierarchically privileged [...] Bendu [...] symbolizes a future whereby people from these two groups can come together... As for Cobra, he symbolizes all evils and atrocities associated with war".

The Analyst described it as "a razor-sharp book, a novel, depicting and epitomizing the horrors, burdens and agony of Liberia's past conflict [...] In the book [...] Ms Shaw gave cross-cutting insights of the bitterness of the conflict days, using the experience of woman who could not find light and respite in her endeavors, but was surviving.

== Awards and recognition ==
- In 2010, Shaw won the Liberian Entertainment Award for best author for Redemption Road.
- The same year, Redemption Road received an honourable mention for mainstream fiction at the 17th annual Writer's Digest International Self-Published Book Awards.

== Personal life ==
Shaw is married and has two children. She has lived in Rwanda since 2013.

== Works ==
- Shaw, Elma (2008). Redemption Road: The Quest for Peace and Justice in Liberia. Foreword by Ellen Johnson Sirleaf. Monrovia and Washington, D.C.: Cotton Tree Press. ISBN 978-0-9800774-0-7. (hardcover; paperback ISBN 978-0-9800774-1-4)
- Shaw, Elma (ed.). Monrovia Rain and Other Stories Lost and Found. Cotton Tree Press. ISBN 978-0-9800774-9-0.
