= Mohale Mashigo =

- Born: Kgomotso Carol Mashigo; Mapetla, Soweto, South Africa
- Other names: Black Porcelain, Carol Mashigo
- Occupations: Novelist, writer, singer, songwriter
- Notable work: Intruders, The Yearning, Kwezi
- Awards: 2017 University of Johannesburg Prize

Mohale Mashigo, born Kgomotso Carol Mashigo (and also known by her stage name Black Porcelain) is a South African singer-songwriter, novelist, and former radio presenter. Her debut novel The Yearning (Pan Macmillan, 2016) won the 2017 University of Johannesburg Prize for South African Debut Writing and was longlisted for the International Dublin Literary Award 2018. She lives in Cape Town.

== Background ==
Mohale was born in Mapetla, Soweto, in 1983. She describes herself as a storyteller who uses the medium of music and prose for expression.

== Music ==
As a musician, she performs under the name Black Porcelain. Her music is play-listed in 36 countries and debut album, Invincible Summer, won two Wawela Music Awards in June 2013.

== Writing ==
Mashigo's debut novel, The Yearning, was published by Pan Macmillan in May 2016. It has been described as "a bewitching addition to the current South African literary boom...", a story told "with charming lucidity, disarming characterisation, subversive wisdom and subtle humour." Mashigo says she wrote it "as a story of healing primarily for myself. The entire book is about secrets and how we heal ourselves from our past." It won the 2016 University of Johannesburg Prize for South African Debut Writing and has been longlisted for the International Dublin Literary Award 2018.

Other books include Intruders (Picador Africa, 2018), a collection of speculative short stories, and Beyond the River, a novelisation of the film by the same name. She is one of the writers for Kwezi, a comic book series set in contemporary urban South Africa. She's one of the guests in the french documentary Children of Captain Africa.

Mashigo won the inaugural Philida Literary Award in 2020.
