= Seagull Books =

Indian publisher

- Founded: 1982; 43 years ago
- Founder: Naveen Kishore
- Country of origin: India
- Headquarters location: Kolkata
- Distribution: Atlantic Publishers & Distributors (India); Chicago Distribution Center (rest of world)
- Publication types: Books
- Fiction genres: Literature, Critical Theory, Translations
- Official website: www.seagullbooks.org

Seagull Books is a publishing venture begun in Kolkata in 1982 by Naveen Kishore, a theater practitioner. It began primarily as a response to the growing need for an Indian publishing house for theater and the other arts and since then it has expanded its operations to include translations of world literature as well as twentieth- and twenty-first-century critical theory and non-fiction. At present, the company has registered divisions in London and New York City alongside its initial establishment in Kolkata (Calcutta).

== Distribution ==
One of the ways Seagull circumvented the problem of being limited to the status of a small independent publishing house catering to a niche market was by securing international distribution that would source its books to a global audience. At present, the University of Chicago Press holds the distribution rights for Seagull Books throughout the world, except India, where it is distributed by Atlantic Publishers and Distributors. This is not co-publication venture; Seagull generally holds world rights for its books.

== See also ==
- Book publishing in India
