= Shadreck Chikoti =

Malawian writer and social activist

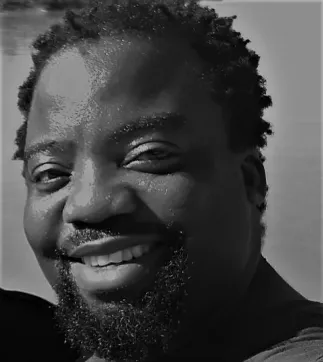
Image of Shadreck Chikoti

Shadreck Chikoti (born 7 October 1979) is a Malawian writer and social activist.

Chikoti writes in both English and Chichewa. His published works include Free Africa Flee! (2001) and Mwana wa Kamuzu (The Son of Kamuzu) (2010). His short story “The Beggar Girl” was included in the anthology Modern Stories from Malawi (2003), edited by Sambalikagwa Mvona. “The Baobab Tree,” for which he won third prize in the 2008 FMB/MAWU Literary Awards, was published in The Bachelor of Chikanda: And Other Stories (2009).

Chikoti has received national and international recognition for his writing. In 2001, he received the Peer Gynt Literary Award for his short story, “The Trap.” In 2011, Chikoti was selected to attend the Caine Prize African Writers’ Workshop in Cameroon, and the story he wrote while there, “Child of a Hyena,” was published in the Caine Prize 2011 anthology, To See the Mountain and other Stories. Chikoti won the 2013 Peer Gynt Literary Award for his science fiction/fantasy novel Azotus the Kingdom, published in Malawi by the Malawi Writers Union in 2015. In 2014, Chikoti was nominated by the Africa39 project as one "of the most promising 39 authors under the age of 40 from Sub-Saharan Africa and the diaspora." An excerpt from Azotus the Kingdom titled “The Occupant” was published in the Africa39 project anthology in October 2014.

Chikoti is also the Director of Pan African Publishers and founder of The Story Club, which gathers writers, critics, and others to share and discuss literature by Malawian writers. The Story Club currently has two branches, one in Lilongwe and the other in Mzuzu.
