= Lal Pathore =

1964 Bengali drama film by Sushil Majumder

- Theatrical poster
- Directed by: Sushil Majumder
- Screenplay by: Sushil Majumder; Manoj Bhattacharya
- Story by: Prashanta Chowdhury
- Produced by: Subhas Ranjan Basu
- Starring: Uttam Kumar; Supriya Devi; Nirmal Kumar; Srabani Basu; Rabi Ghosh
- Cinematography: Bijoy Ghosh
- Edited by: Ardhendu Chatterjee; Debi Ganguly
- Music by: Salil Chowdhury
- Production company: Esarby Productions
- Distributed by: Friends Union
- Release date: 6 November 1964
- Running time: 131 minutes
- Country: India
- Language: Bengali

Lal Pathore (Bengali pronunciation: [lal paθor] transl. The Red Stone) is a 1964 Indian Bengali-language period action drama film co-written and directed by Sushil Majumder. Produced by Subhas Ranjan Basu under the banner of Esarby Productions, the film stars Uttam Kumar, Supriya Devi, Nirmal Kumar and Srabani Basu in lead roles, while Rabi Ghosh, Raja Mukherjee, Mani Srimani and Majumder himself play another pivotal roles.

Based on a story by Prashanta Chowdhury, the film follows the transformation of a kind-hearted king into an arrogant ruler, when he becomes obsessed with a girl younger than him, because of a curse regarding his royal ancestors.

The film pairs Kumar and Devi for the seventh time, and also marks their only collaboration with Majumder. Music of the film is composed by Salil Chowdhury, with lyrics penned by himself and Gulzar in his debut in Bengali cinema. Filming took places in Kolkata, Alipurduar and Agra, while some sequences were shot in Fatehpur Sikri, being the first Bengali film to be picturized there. Its cinematography was handled by Bijoy Ghosh, with editing by Ardhendu Chatterjee and Debi Ganguly.

Lal Pathore was theatrically released on 6 November 1964, coinciding with Kali Puja. It opened to positive response both critically and commercially; it got appraisal for its story, cinematography, score and the notable performances by both Kumar and Devi in negative roles. It was later remade by Majumder himself into Hindi as Lal Patthar (1971) starring Raaj Kumar, Hema Malini, Rakhee Gulzar and Vinod Mehra in the lead.

== Plot ==
A family goes to Fatehpur Sikri for a picnic. There they encounter an old man, who says that every stone of the fort is steeped in a story written with blood. The old man asks the family to see Lal Pathore, the red stone, which the family retorts is not on the guidebook. The old man says that the guidebooks don't reveal the history of the fort. The old man is paranoid and sees blood even in a glass of plain water. He narrates the story of Rai Nagar, whose first ruler was Raghab Shankar Rai, who had been a bandit in his early life. Raghab sexually assaulted a peasant woman named Sonmai during one of his village raids, and made her his wife. Sonmai cursed the entire family with insanity.

Now in the 7th generation, Hemadakanta Roy, also known as Kumar Bahadur, is the only male heir of the house. His grandfather is Ram Shankar Rai and is mentally unstable. As a kid, Hemada stopped his drunk father Anandakanta from sexually assaulting a maid in their palace. He was sent to his uncle in Allahabad, where he passed M.A. in history and psychology. He returned home with his servant Raghu, in order to take over the royal duties. To become the ruler, Hemada has to marry, but he has decided not to, as he fears that he will ruin a woman's life due to Sonmai's curse.

Passionate for hunting, Hemada goes to the jungle to hunt a man-eating tiger. After killing the tiger, he manages to fight off a group of bandits that were carrying a palanquin. The bandits escape and Hemada finds a woman named Soudamini inside the palanquin. He brings Saudamini home and is smitten with her beauty. Hemada finds that Soudamini is the widow of Phakirchand from a nearby village, which was plundered by bandits a few days ago. Then he sends Soudamini back, but Gokul's mother declares her unchaste and refuses to let her back into the house. Phakirchand's mother is scared by the guns of Hemada's guards and is forced to accept Soudamini. Back at the palace, Hemada starts to drink. He finds that Soudamini is being tortured in her own home and brings her back to his palace. Renaming her Madhuri, Hemada invites the lower-class woman to his rich home and eventually has sex with her. But he refuses to marry Madhuri. Still, Madhuri has full control over the house and has Hemada wrapped around her fingers. He also educates Madhuri. Initially, Hemada is enamored with Madhuri, but with time he realizes that Madhuri cannot be trained (in singing) or educated. She has a middle class thinking, limited ambition and a negative mindset. He becomes disgusted with Madhuri.

Ten years have passed and although Hemada is no longer a young man, he falls in love with Sumita, a much younger classical singer at an event. He finds that Sumita's father Harishchandra Chakraborty is a gambler and in heavy debts. He organizes a financial deal with her father and marries her. Sumita's mother Madhu was vehemently against the marriage but was overruled by Harish. Meanwhile, Sumita's marriage was almost fixed with her childhood crush Ambarish, an enigineer who was coming to India from London to marry her. But before he arrived, Harish married off Sumita to Hemada for money. It is clear that Madhuri becomes jealous of Hemada's marriage with Sumita. Due to her anger, Hemada does not consummate his marriage to Sumita.

Sumita tells Ambarish that she was forced to marry Hemada, as Harish was beating Madhu relentlessly. Hemada finds out Sumita's pre-marital relationship with Ambarish. Ambarish was also the one who taught music to Sumita. Hemada befriends Hemada and invites him to the palace for their music sessions. Madhuri is quick to figure out their relationship and starts poisoning Hemada's mind that Ambarish and Sumita might have been close to getting married before he came into Sumita's life. Madhuri then invites Ambarish to the palace, while Hemada is away, and escorts him to Sumita's room, assuring him that these are Hemada's orders. Meanwhile, Hemada tries to balance both Sumita and Madhuri, and disappointing both in the process. Hemada knows that Madhuri is jealous of Sumita, but Madhuri continues to play the theme that Sumita is cheating on Hemada with Ambarish and drives him insane.

One day, Hemada returns to the palace while Ambarish was with Sumita in her room. Ambarish was only consoling Sumita to give more time to her marriage and things would get better, but Hemada misunderstands and believes that Sunita was plotting against him with Sumita. But then he sees Madhuri trying to seduce Ambarish and realizes that Madhuri has gone blind with rage. He asks Madhuri to leave the palace and scars her face with a whip. Hemada takes Sunita with him to Agra. He finds her wishing at the grave of Maulana Salim Chisti, and believes that she is wishing for Ambarish, while she was wishing for a child. Hemada writes to Ambarish and asks him to come to Agra.

Once Ambarish arrives, Hemada says that he is not feeling well and sends Ambarish and Sumita to see the Taj Mahal. He then follows them and spies on them. He hears only parts of their conversation and is convinced that Ambarish and Sumita still love each other. Hemada invites Ambarish to view the fort of Fatehpur Sikri with him on full moon night.

Hemada puts on an act, which convinces Ambarish that the ghosts of the fort are real. He even fires 2 blanks at a person who was paid to act as a ghost. But then Hemada changed the blanks to real bullets in the rifle, as the next female ghost comes along. He gives the gun to Ambarish, who fires at the ghost, and it turns out to be Sumita, whom Hemada had also invited to the fort that night to complete the act. Before dying, Sumita tells Hemada that she only wished to be the mother of his children. He loses his mental balance. Hemada wants to kill himself, but Ambarish stops him and wrestles with him for the gun. In the chaos, Hemada shoots Ambarish, and he dies as well. The curse of Sonmai is completed. He wanders the fort waiting for Sumita's ghost on every full moon night. But it is revealed that Madhuri is alive and she is the one who plays the role of Sunita to give solace to Hemada.

== Cast ==
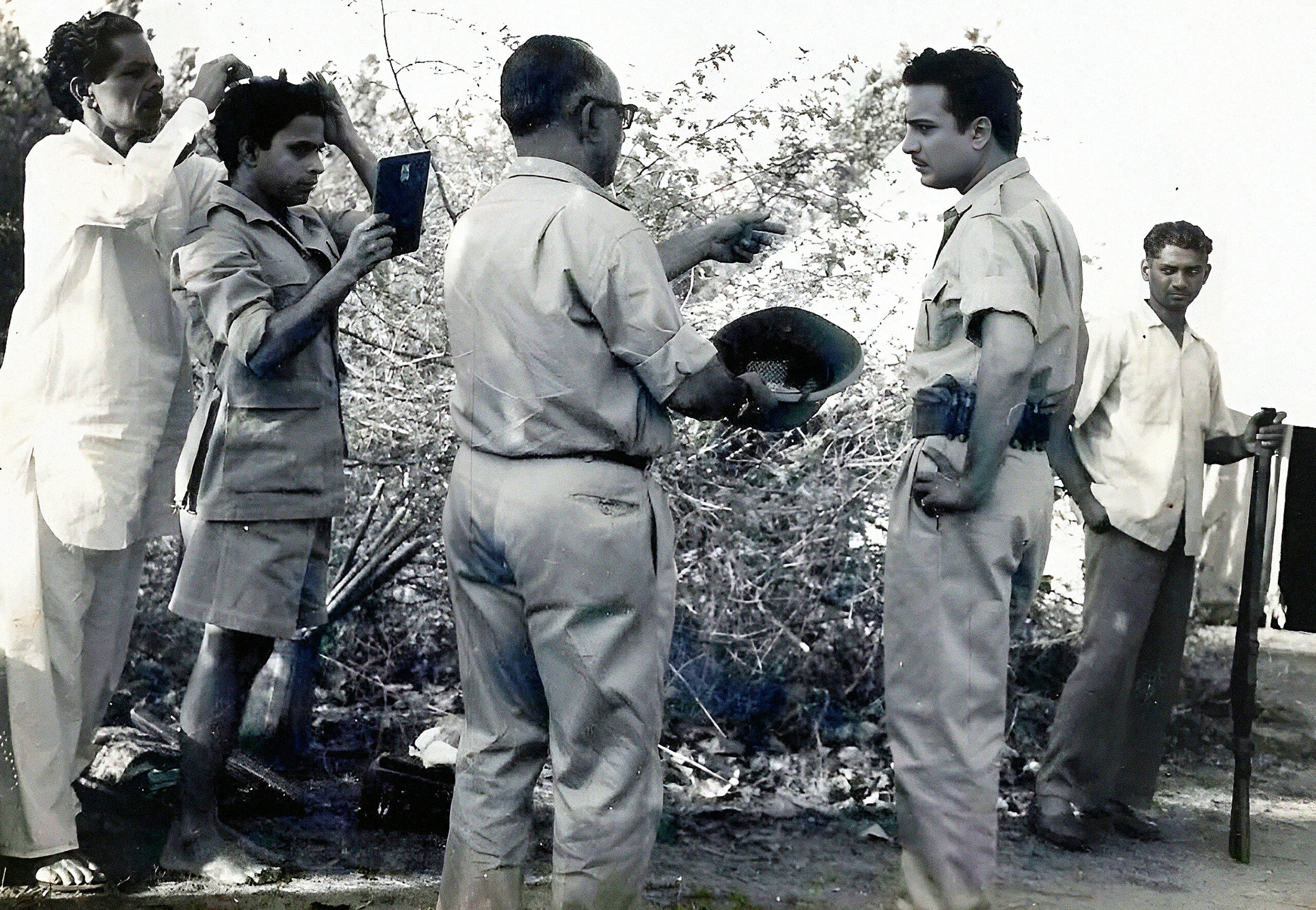
Uttam Kumar (right) and Rabi Ghosh (left) with Sushil Majumder during the shoot of the famous tiger hunting scene in Lal Pathore.

- Uttam Kumar as Hemadakanta Rai / Kumar Bahadur
- Supriya Devi as Soudamini / Madhuri
- Nirmal Kumar as Ambarish "Ambar"
- Srabani Bose as Sumita
- Rabi Ghosh as Raghu
- Sushil Majumdar as Harishchandra Chakraborty, Sumita's father
- Raja Mukherjee
- Dhiren Ganguly
- Mani Srimani
- Malina Devi
- Rajlakshmi Devi
- Nani Ganguly

== Music ==
Lal Pathore

Soundtrack album to Lal Pathore by Salil Chowdhury
- Released: 1964
- Genre: Feature Film Soundtrack
- Length: 14:00
- Language: Bengali
- Label: Saregama
- Producer: Salil Chowdhury

Salil Chowdhury chronology
Ayanaanto (1964)	Lal Pathore (1964)	Chand Aur Suraj (1965)
External audio
- Lal Pathore Audio Jukebox on YouTube

Salil Chowdhury composed the music of the film in his collaborations with Majumder for the first time, and with Kumar for the second time after Raat Bhore (1955).

The soundtrack consists of five tracks, whereas "Alo Amar Alo" is a Rabindra Sangeet. It had a German version used in the soundtrack which was translated by Ms. Anjelika and Amit Ghosh. The rest tracks are penned by Chowdhury and Gulzar in his debut in Bengali cinema.

Track listing
No.	Title	Lyrics	Music	Singer(s)	Length
1.	"Alo Amar Alo"	Rabindranath Tagore	Rabindranath Tagore	Shyamal Mitra	1:19
2.	"Ja Ja Ja Banshi Ja Re"	Salil Chowdhury	Salil Chowdhury	Sabita Chowdhury	3:33
3.	"Deko Na More Deko Na Go"	Salil Chowdhury	Salil Chowdhury	Shyamal Mitra, Sabita Chowdhury	2:58
4.	"Saas Ke Jakhm"	Gulzar	Salil Chowdhury	Manna Dey	3:21
5.	"Ruk Ruk Se Qadam"	Gulzar	Salil Chowdhury	Mubarak Begum	2:49
Total length:					14:00

== Remake ==
Shakti Samanta wanted to remake the film in Hindi with Rajesh Khanna in 1970, but later he decided to produce it due to his commitments with Pagla Kahin Ka (1970) and Kati Patang (1971), and approached Majumder to direct the film. However, it got cancelled as the remake rights proved to be expensive. The same year, F. C. Mehra bought the remake rights and signed Majumder as the director of the film. In 1971, it was remade as Lal Patthar, where Raaj Kumar, Hema Malini, Rakhee Gulzar and Vinod Mehra played the lead roles.
