= Aabaar Bochhor Kuri Pore =

1995 studio album by Moheener Ghoraguli

Studio album by Various artists
- Released: 1995
- Recorded: 1995
- Venues: Kolkata, West Bengal
- Studio: Presto
- Genre: Bengali rock
- Label: Asha Audio

Various artists chronology
Aabaar Bochhor Kuri Pore (1995)	Jhora Somoyer Gaan (1996)

Moheener Ghoraguli chronology
Drishyomaan Moheener Ghoraguli (1997)

Aabaar Bochhor Kuri Pore is a Bengali album by various musical groups and artists with a collaboration by the rock band Moheener Ghoraguli. It was released in 1995 by Asha Audio at Kolkata. This album is not an original Moheen album, like their earlier releases. It was released nearly twenty years after the last album in 1979.

Many of the songs were not composed by Moheener Ghoraguli, and none of them were sung by the group. Where Moheener Ghoraguli acted as an umbrella to bring disparate bands and individuals together and provided a platform to these upcoming talents of the Bengali music scene to perform.

Since their last album, most of the Moheener Ghoraguli members had moved ahead with their careers and lives, and so the only person involved in the making of this, and the next three albums, was Gautam Chattopadhyay.

== Packaging ==
The cover art depicts the seahorse, a band icon. The cover and album artwork design was by Hiran Mitra. In January 1995, a booklet of the album by the same name was published for the Kolkata Book Fair.

== Track listing ==
Side 1
No.	Title	Lyrics	Music	Vocal(s)	Length
1.	"Porashonar Jalanjoli Bhebe"	Gautam Chattopadhyay	Gautam Chattopadhyay, Tapas Das	Lakkhichhara	4:20
2.	"Dhandhar Theke Jotil Tumi"	Jayjit Lahiri	Subrata Ghosh	Garer Maath	3:43
3.	"Katha Dia Bandhu"	Gautam Chattopadhyay	Anup Biswas, Badal Sarkar	Anup Biswas, Badal Sarkar	4:52
4.	"Elo Ki E Asamay"	Gautam Chattopadhyay	Gautam Chattopadhyay, Tapas Das	Antara Chowdhury	6:36

Side 2
No.	Title	Lyrics	Music	Vocal(s)	Length
5.	"Ganga"	Arunendu Das	Arunendu Das	Rituparna Das, Chandrima Mitra, Paroma Banerji	4:20
6.	"Ami Dandike Roi"	Surojit Chatterjee	Surojit Chatterjee	Surojit Chatterjee, (Background Vocal Harmony - Gautam Chattopadhyay, Bonnie Chakraborty, Neil Mukherjee)	5:11
7.	"Aakashe Chharano Megher Kachakachi"	Dibyo Mukhopadhyay	Dibyo Mukhopadhyay	Dibyo Mukhopadhyay, (Background Vocal Harmony - Gautam Chattopadhyay, Bonnie Chakraborty, Neil Mukherjee)	5:28
8.	"Prithibi Ta Naki Chhoto Hote Hote"	Gautam Chattopadhyay, Pallab Roy (Additional Lyricist)	Krosswindz, Gautam Chattopadhyay	Bonnie Chakraborty	6:04

== Personnel ==
Artists

- Gautam Chattopadhyay– vocal
- Antara Chowdhury– vocal
- Rituparna Das– vocal
- Chandrima Mitra– vocal
- Paroma Banerji– vocal
- Prabir Das– vocal
- Arunendu Das– vocal
- Surojit Chatterjee– vocal
- Dibyo Mukhopadhyay– vocal

Groups

- Lakkhichhara
- Garer Maath
- Krosswindz

Technical

- Debjit Biswas– sound
- Tushar Halder– coordination
- Tapas Das– coordination
- Moheener Ghoraguli– coordination
- Gautam Chattopadhyay– chief editor
- Hiran Mitra– cover

== Bibliography ==
- Nag, Amitava (10 November 2009). Silhouette. Kolkata: Silhoutte Magazine. p. 130. Retrieved 1 May 2026.
