= Lal Patthar =

- Directed by: Sushil Majumdar
- Written by: Prasanta Chowdhary; Vrajendra Gaur (Dialogue)
- Screenplay by: Nabendu Ghosh
- Produced by: F. C. Mehra
- Starring: Raaj Kumar; Hema Malini; Raakhee; Vinod Mehra
- Cinematography: Dwarka Divecha
- Edited by: Pran Mehra
- Music by: Shankar–Jaikishan
- Release date: 1971
- Running time: 148 minutes
- Country: India
- Language: Hindi

Lal Patthar is a 1971 Indian Hindi-language action drama film, produced by F. C. Mehra, and directed by Sushil Majumdar. The film is a remake of Majumder's own Bengali film Lal Pathore (1964). The film stars Raaj Kumar, Hema Malini, Raakhee, Vinod Mehra, Ajit. The film is one of the rare films where lead actress Hema Malini played a negative role, being a jealous mistress of a zamindar who tries to frame his young wife as an adultress. Her performance received accolades. The music of the film was composed by Shankar–Jaikishan.

The film was shot on some minor outdoor locations and at Mehboob Studios, as well as at Natraj Studios Bombay.

== Plot ==
A family goes to Fatehpur Sikri for a picnic. There they encounter an old man, who says that every stone of the fort is steeped in a story written with blood. The old man asks the family to see Lal Patthar, the red stone, which the family retorts is not on the guidebook. The old man says that the guidebooks don't reveal the history of the fort. The old man is paranoid and sees blood even in a glass of plain water. The old man narrates the story of Rai Nagar. The first ruler of Rai Nagar Raja Raghav Shankar Rai (Ajit) was a bandit. Raghav sexually assaulted a peasant woman named Sonmai during one of his village raids, and made her his wife. Sonmai cursed the entire family with insanity.

Now in the 7th generation, Gyan Shankar is the only male heir of the house. His grandfather is Raja Ram Shankar Rai (D. K. Sapru) and is mentally unstable. As a kid, Gyan stopped his drunk father Anand Shankar from sexually assaulting a maid in their palace. Gyan Shankar was sent to his uncle in Allahabad, where he studied history and psychology. Gyan returned home with Chhotu (Paintal), his servant. To become the ruler, Gyan has to marry, but he has decided not to, as he fears that he will ruin a woman's life due to Sonmai's curse.

Raja Gyan Shankar Rai (Raaj Kumar) is also known as Kumar Bahadur. He goes to the jungle to hunt a man-eating tiger. After killing the tiger, Gyan manages to fight off a group of bandits that were carrying a palanquin. The bandits escape and Gyan finds a woman named Saudamani (Hema Malini) inside the Palanquin.

Gyan brings Saudamani home and is smitten with her beauty. Gyan finds that Saudamani is the widow of Gokul from a nearby village, which was plundered by bandits a few days ago. Gyan sends Saudamani back, but Gokul's mother (Leela Mishra) declares her unchaste and refuses to let her back into the house. Gokul's mother is scared by the guns of Gyan's guards and is forced to accept Saudamani. Back at the palace, Gyan starts to drink. Gyan finds that Saudamani is being tortured in her own home and brings her back to his palace.

Calling her Madhuri, he invites the lower-class woman to his rich home and eventually has sex with her. But Gyan refuses to marry Madhuri. Still, Madhuri has full control over the house and has Gyan wrapped around her fingers. Gyan also educates Madhuri. Initially, Gyan is enamored with Madhuri, but with time he realizes that Madhuri cannot be trained (in singing) or educated. She has a middle class thinking, limited ambition and a negative mindset. He becomes disgusted with Madhuri. Soon, ten years have passed and Gyan is no longer a young man.

Gyan runs away from his palace, and comes across a singing function, where he meets a much younger woman, Sumita (Raakhee). Gyan finds that Sumita's father Harishchandra Chakraborty is a gambler and in heavy debts. Gyan organizes a financial deal with her father and marries her. Sumita's mother Madhu (Dulari) was vehemently against the marriage but was overruled by Harish.

Sumita had a childhood sweetheart, Shekhar (Vinod Mehra), and was coming to India from London, to marry her. But before he arrived, Harish married off Sumita to Gyan for money. It is clear that Madhuri is not happy with Gyan marrying Sumita. Due to her anger, Gyan does not consummate his marriage to Sumita.

Sumita tells Shekhar that she was forced to marry Gyan, as Harish was beating Madhu relentlessly. Gyan finds out that Sumita was friends with Shekhar before her marriage. Shekhar was also the one who taught music to Sumita. Gyan befriends Shekhar and invites him to the palace for their music sessions. Madhuri is quick to figure out that Shekhar and Sumita were lovers before Sumita married Gyan. Madhuri starts poisoning Gyan's mind that Shekhar and Sumita might have been close to getting married before he came into Sumita's life.

Madhuri then invites Shekhar to the palace, while Gyan is away, and escorts him to Sumita's room, assuring him that these are Gyan's orders. Meanwhile, Gyan tries to balance both Sumita and Madhuri, and disappointing both in the process. Gyan knows that Madhuri is jealous of Sumita, but Madhuri continues to play the theme that Sumita is cheating on Gyan with Shekhar and drives Gyan insane.

One day Gyan returns home while Shekhar was with Sumita in her room. Shekhar was only consoling Sumita to give more time to her marriage and things would get better, but Gyan misunderstands and believes that Shekhar was plotting against him with Sumita.

But then Gyan sees Madhuri trying to seduce Shekhar and realizes that Madhuri has gone blind with rage. He asks Madhuri to leave the palace and scars her face with a whip. Gyan takes Sumita with him to Agra. He finds Sumita wishing at the grave of Maulana Salim Chisti, and believes that she is wishing for Shekhar. Gyan writes to Shekhar and asks him to come to Agra.

Once Shekhar arrives, Gyan says that he is not feeling well and sends Shekhar and Sumita to see the Taj Mahal. He then follows them and spies on them. Gyan hears only parts of their conversation and is convinced that Shekhar and Sumita still love each other. Gyan invites Shekhar to view the fort of Fatehpur Sikri with him on full moon night.

Gyan puts on an act, which convinces Shekhar that the ghosts of the fort are real. Gyan even fires 2 blanks at a person who was paid to act as a ghost. But then Gyan changed the blanks to real bullets in the rifle, as the next female ghost comes along. Gyan gives the gun to Shekhar, who fires at the ghost, and it turns out to be Sumita, whom Gyan had also invited to the fort that night to complete the act. Before dying, Sumita tells Gyan that she only wished to be the mother of his children. Gyan loses his mental balance. Gyan wants to kill himself, but Shekhar stops him and wrestles with Gyan for the gun. In the chaos, Gyan shoots Shekhar, and he dies as well. The curse of Sonmai is completed. Gyan wanders the fort waiting for Sumita's ghost on every full moon night. But it is revealed that Madhuri is alive and she is the one who plays the role of Sumita to give solace to Gyan. She takes Gyan home for the night.

== Cast ==
- Raaj Kumar as Kumar Bahadur Gyan Shankar Rai
- Hema Malini as Saudamani / Madhuri
- Raakhee as Sumita
- Vinod Mehra as Shekhar
- Ajit as Raja Raghav Shankar Rai
- D. K. Sapru as Raja Ram Shankar Rai
- Asit Sen as Haricharan
- Paintal as Chhotu
- Dulari as Mrs. Madhu Chakraborty
- Leela Mishra as Gokul's mother
- Padma Khanna as Courtesanjaan

== Critical reception ==
Lal Patthar was one of the films featured in Avijit Ghosh's book, 40 Retakes: Bollywood Classics You May Have Missed.

== Soundtrack ==
Lal Patthar

Studio album by Shankar Jaikishan
- Released: 1971 (India)
- Genre: Feature film soundtrack
- Label: His Master's Voice
- Producer: Shankar Jaikishan

Shankar Jaikishan chronology
Nadaan (1971)	Lal Patthar (1971)	Rivaaj (1972)

The film's music was composed by Shankar–Jaikishan and lyrics were by Hasrat Jaipuri, Neeraj and Dev Kohli. The song "Geet Gata Hoon Main", written by Dev Kohli and sung by Kishore Kumar stood at number 18 on the Annual 1972 listing of Binaca Geetmala. Asha Bhosle received a Filmfare Award nomination for Best Female Playback Singer in 1973 for her rendition of "Sooni Sooni Saans Ki Sitar Par". Another memorable number in the film is the Ghazal, "Unke Khayal Aaye To", a composition based on Bageshwari / Gara ably sung by Mohammed Rafi. The song "Re Mann Sur Mein Ga" by Manna Dey won the "Sur Singar" Award for the year 1971.

Song	Singer	Raga
"Geet Gata Hoon Main"	Kishore Kumar	
"Unke Khayal Aaye To"	Mohammed Rafi	
"Aa Aaja, Dikhaun Tujhe"	Asha Bhosle	
"Sooni Sooni Saans Ki Sitar"	Asha Bhosle	Jaijaivanti
"Phoolon Se Meri Sej Saja Do"	Asha Bhosle	
"Re Mann Sur Mein Ga, Koi Taar Besur Na Bole"	Asha Bhosle, Manna Dey	
