= Jhora Somoyer Gaan =

1996 studio album by Moheener Ghoraguli

Studio album by Various artists
- Released: 1996
- Recorded: 1996
- Studio: Presto
- Genre: Bengali music
- Length: 40:34
- Label: Asha Audio
- Producer: Moheener Ghoraguli

Various artists chronology
Aabaar Bochhor Kuri Pore (1995)	Jhora Somoyer Gaan (1996)	Maya (1997)

Moheener Ghoraguli chronology
Drishyomaan Moheener Ghoraguli (1997)

Jhora Somoyer Gaan (Bengali: ঝরা সময়ের গান) is a Bengali album by various musical groups and artists with collaboration and produced by the rock band Moheener Ghoraguli. It was released in 1996 by Asha Audio in India.

== Packaging ==
Jhora Somoyer Gaan cover art depicts fallen green leaves within a red background, where leaves may represents the fallen time. Longtime Moheen's collaborator Hiran Mitra provided the album artwork. In January 1996, a booklet of the album in the same name was published in Kolkata Book Fair.

== Track listing ==
Side 1
No.	Title	Lyrics	Music	Vocal(s)	Length
1.	"Manush Chena Daye"	Joyjit Lahiri	Subrata Ghosh	Subrata Ghosh; Bonnie Chakraborty	4:19
2.	"Shangbigno Pakhikul" (from Shangbigno Pakhikul O Kolkata Bishayak (1977))	Moheener Ghoraguli	Moheener Ghoraguli	Bonnie Chakraborty	3:05
3.	"Gaan-Mala (Kisher Eto Tara)"	Arunendu Das	Arunendu Das	Rituparna Das; Chandrima Mitra	2:30
4.	"Gaan-Mala (Gaibo Shudhu Gaan)"	Gautam Chattopadhyay	Gautam Chattopadhyay	Subrata Ghosh; Bonnie Chakraborty; Rituparna Das; Chandrima Mitra	3:59
5.	"Gaan-Mala (Ke Ke Jabi Re)"	Arunendu Das	Arunendu Das	Subrata Ghosh; Bonnie Chakraborty; Rituparna Das; Chandrima Mitra	1:57
6.	"Gaan-Mala (Binita Kemon Achho?)"	Moheener Ghoraguli	Moheener Ghoraguli	Neil Mukherjee	2:33
7.	"Sara Raat"	Arunendu Das	Arunendu Das	Subrata Ghosh; Bonnie Chakraborty; Neil Mukherjee	4:14

Side 2
No.	Title	Lyrics	Music	Vocal(s)	Length
8.	"Shei Phuler Dol"	Gautam Chattopadhyay	Gautam Chattopadhyay	Rituparna Das; Chandrima Mitra	5:18
9.	"Moymonshingha Geetika"	Traditional	Gautam Chattopadhyay	Anup Biswas; Badal Sarkar	4:43
10.	"Tomay Dilam"	Joyjit Lahiri	Subrata Ghosh	Garer Maath	3:56
11.	"Aamar Priya Cafe"	Gautam Chattopadhyay	Gautam Chattopadhyay	Gautam Chattopadhyay	5:57

== Personnel ==
- Neil Mukherjee – guitar, banjo, keyboard, music arrangement
- Bonnie Chakraborty – vocal, thumba, shaker, cuica, barimba
- Subrata Ghosh – vocal, guitar
- Dwight Pattison – bass
- Rituparna Das – vocal
- Chandrima Mitra – vocal
- Anup Biswas
- Badal Sarkar

Production and design

- Moheener Ghoraguli – producer
- Debjit Biswas – sound record
- Hiran Mitra – sleeve design
