= Jeevan Mrityu =

1970 film by Satyen Bose

- Poster
- Directed by: Satyen Bose
- Written by: Biswanath Roy (story); Anand Bakshi (lyrics)
- Based on: Jiban Mrityu (1967 Bengali film)
- Produced by: Tarachand Barjatya
- Starring: Dharmendra; Raakhee; Ajit
- Edited by: K. Narayanan (Malayalam dubbed version)
- Music by: Laxmikant–Pyarelal
- Production company: Rajshri Productions
- Release date: 6 January 1970
- Running time: 140 minutes
- Country: India
- Language: Hindi

Jeevan Mrityu (transl. Life and death) is a 1970 Hindi-language crime action thriller film produced by Tarachand Barjatya for Rajshri Productions. The film starred Dharmendra, Raakhee, Ajit, Rajindernath and Leela Chitnis. The film was a remake of a 1967 Bengali film Jiban Mrityu starring Uttam Kumar and Supriya Devi in lead roles. The film's music was composed by Laxmikant Pyarelal while Anand Bakshi penned the lyrics. The film was dubbed in Malayalam as Jeevitha Samaram.

The film was Raakhee's debut in Hindi film.

== Plot ==
Ashok Tandon and Deepa are childhood friends who study in the same college and love each other. After college Ashok starts working in a bank and soon becomes bank manager, and both are to be married soon. However, Ashok is arrested for theft from the bank. He asks Deepa to look after his mother, which she agrees to do. He is sentenced to prison for several years. After his release, he finds out that his mother has died; Deepa is married and has re-located; and he was framed by his colleagues at the bank. Devastated but still honest, he is befriended by Raja Ranbir Singh, who gives him a job, as well a new identity. Ashok now becomes Bikram Singh, and he must seek out Deepa, and his shrewd and calculating colleagues at the bank to extract vengeance.

Deepa and Shankar are kidnapped by Harish. Ashok agrees to pay ransom. Deepa learns that Bikram Singh is Ashok. A fight broke out between Harish's goons and Ashok. Prem Prakash saves Ashok from goons. Shankar hangs on roof and saved by Ashok. The police arrive and arrest Harish. The high court punishes Harish and his goons.

== Cast ==
- Dharmendra as Ashok Tandon and Bikram Sher Singh
- Raakhee as Deepa Tandon
- Ajit as Harishchandra Shroff 'Harish'
- Bipin Gupta as Raja Ranvir Singh
- Kanhaiyalal as Jagat Narayan
- Ramesh Deo as Barrister P. Amarnath
- Bipin Gupta as Raja Ranvir Singh
- P. Jairaj as S.N. Roy
- Krishan Dhawan as Ramakant
- Master Bunty as Shankar
- Rajendra Nath as Prem Prakash
- Leela Chitnis as Ashok's mother
- Gajanan Jagirdar as Deepa's father
- Shabnam as Jaishree
- V. Gopal as Bhim Sen
- Roopesh Kumar as Sameer
- Murad as the Judge
- Zeb Rahman as Singer in Bikram's party

== Soundtrack ==
All lyrics are written by Anand Bakshi.

No.	Title	Singer(s)	Length
1.	"Jhilmil Sitaron Ka Aangan Hoga"	Lata Mangeshkar, Mohammed Rafi
2.	"Zamane Mein Aji"	Lata Mangeshkar
3.	"Jhilmil Sitaron Ka Aangan Hoga"	Lata Mangeshkar

=== Malayalam dubbed version ===
All lyrics are written by P. Bhaskaran.

No.	Title	Singer(s)	Length
1.	"Chinnum Venthaarathin"	S. Janaki
2.	"Chinnum Venthaarathin"	K. J. Yesudas, S. Janaki
3.	"Hey Maane"	S. Janaki

== Reception ==
It was Blockbuster at box office. Also one of the Biggest blockbuster and One of the highest grossers of that year.
