= Arunendu Das =

Burmese-born Bengali architect, singer-songwriter, and musician (1938–2019)

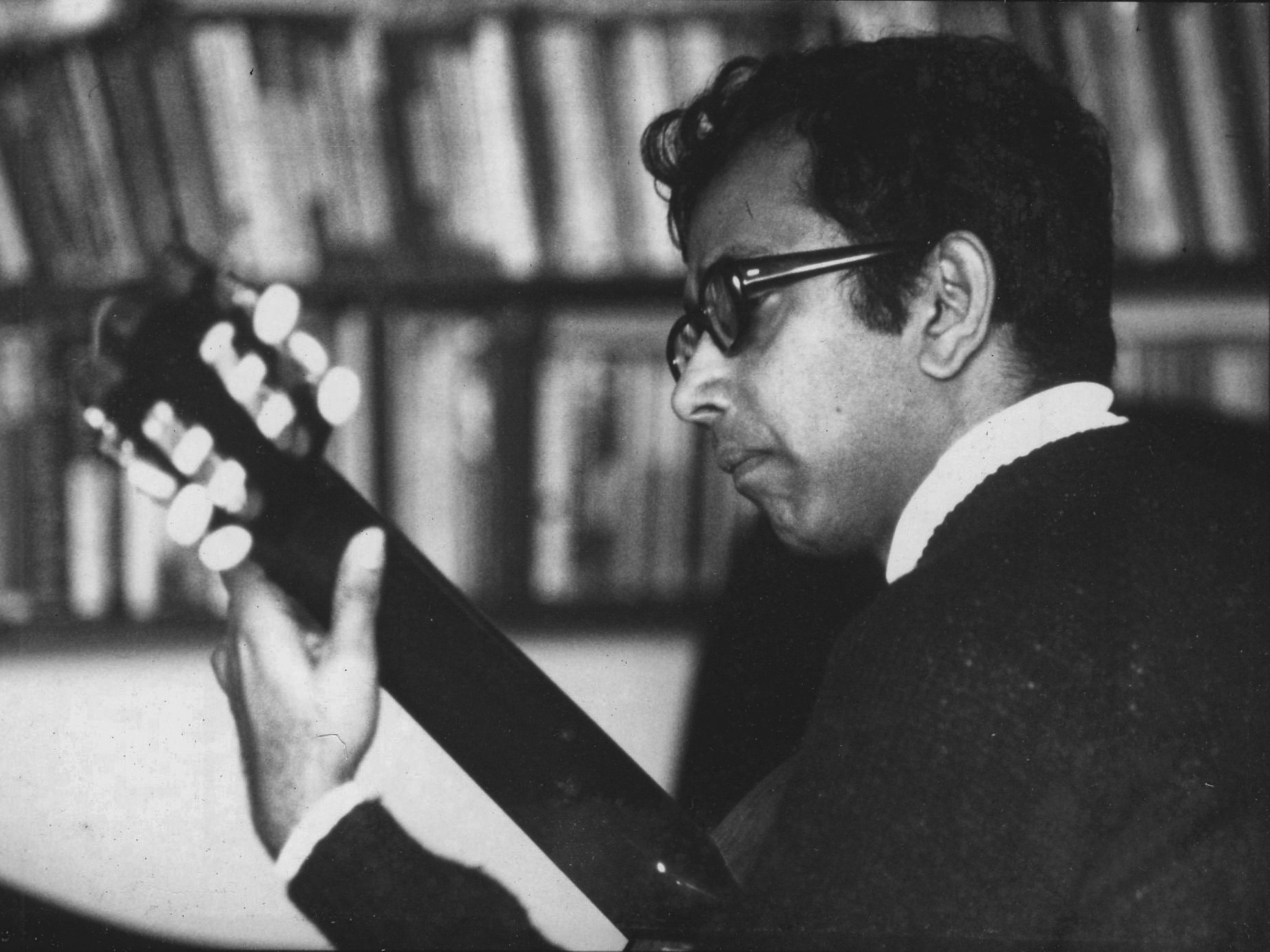
- Arunendu Das
- Born: 1938; Rangoon (now Yangon), Burma (now Myanmar)
- Died: February 3, 2019 (aged 80–81); Kolkata, India
- Other name: Arun Da
- Citizenship: United Kingdom
- Education: Bengal Engineering College
- Occupations: Architect; singer-songwriter; musician
- Parents: Jodhulal Das (father); Amiyabala Das (mother)
- Musical career
- Origin: Kolkata
- Genres: Folk rock, blues rock, psychedelic rock
- Instrument: Guitar

Arunendu Das (1938 – 2 February 2019) was a Burmese born Bengali architect, singer-songwriter and musician. He was one of the pioneers of late 20th-century alternative Bengali songwriting. While Moheener Ghoraguli is considered to be the first Bengali Band, Arunendu was the first person to compose Bengali lyrics for songs written specifically to be accompanied by guitar, a genus of Bengali music which has become increasingly popular over time.

== Early life ==
Arunendu Das was born in 1938 at Rangoon (now Yangon) to Jodhulal Das – a medical doctor and Amiyabala Das – a housewife. The outbreak of World War II led Dr. Das to move his family from Rangoon to Bajrayogini village in Bikrampur, Bangladesh. Arunendu, one of six children of the Das family (four sisters and two brothers), spent his early years in Bangladesh.

Arunendu was a member of the scout group of Bhowanipur Mitra Institution (Kolkata), and traveled with them on a camping trip to Puri (Orissa) in the summer of 1955. It was at that time, during a friendly singing competition between various other scout groups camping there, that he conceived the idea of composing his own lyrics. His song "Chanchal Ek Dal Scout Bhai" ("A Restless Group of Boy Scouts"), applying his own Bengali lyrics to the tune of the popular contemporary song "Ujjawl ek-jhank Paiera" ("A Cluster of Bright Pigeons").

Arunendu introduced to the formal rudiments of music and the techniques of playing the steel guitar by his school friend Prabir Kumar Das. He sought to exploit this newfound knowledge fully during his time at Bengal Engineering College, Shibpur (1956–1961), where he studied architecture. He continued his songwriting and composed parodies of various contemporary songs to amuse and entertain his fellow students. His songs and parodies were immensely popular and many of his friends continued to sing his songs to their friends in various places, even after leaving college.

During his time at Bengal Engineering (BE) College Arunendu was actually more established and appreciated as a Hawaiian guitar player and by his own admission never dared to sing publicly. Though inspired by Bengali singers like Hemanta Mukhopadhyay, Pratima, Sandhya Mukhopadhyay, Manna De, Shyamal, Satinath and Manabendra, Dhananjay who were in their heyday, he never intended to make a career out of music, preferring to write his songs purely for his own enjoyment.

Most of his songs were personal in nature and were composed primarily to exercise his newly acquired knowledge about the chords on a steel guitar and to sing to his close circle of friends. He also gained substantial popularity for his numerous "parody" versions (with Bengali lyrics) of western classics. At this time Arunendu also started to dabble in classical Spanish guitar, not then an easily available option in Kolkata with its usage restricted to the pubs of the Park Street area and certain members of the Anglo-Indian community.

== In England ==
Arunendu moved to England in the late sixties. He was immediately struck by the lyrics and renderings of contemporary American and English popular songs. Joining the folk club of the market town of Bicester in Oxfordshire where he lived and was practicing as an architect, he picked up certain guitar techniques from the resident and guest artists who performed there. He felt that these techniques could be applied to Bengali songwriting and consequently started writing lyrics in Bengali to conform to those melodic and rhythmic ideas. His cousin Prasanta De (Habul), a student of architecture at BE College at that time and an accomplished folk guitarist in his own right, popularised those songs within the college campus and beyond during the 1970s.

== Moheener Ghoraguli ==
Arunendu's songs were never intended for a wider audience and this remained the case until one day Gautam Chattopadhyay paid a visit to his residence in Moore Avenue (Kolkata) in early 1987. One of Gautam's younger brothers Pradip Chatterjee (Bula), a talented musician, abstract lyricist, and expressionist, had studied at BE College during the 1970s and had introduced a number of Arunendu's songs to Gautam. Gautam loved them so much that he included Arunendu's songs in all four of his collections of contemporary Bengali songs which he released in the name of his long-disbanded group Mohiner Ghoraguli edited. During the release of their first come-back album "Aabaar Bochhor Kuri Pore" (1995), the accompanying brochure of the same name mentioned about Arunendu as a predecessor of Mohiner Ghoraguli. His songs are included in "Jhora Somoyer Gaan" (1996), "Maya" (1997) and "Khyapar Gaan" (1999). Many of Moheener Ghoraguli's timeless hits, including "Kisher Eto Tara", "Ke Ke Jabi Re", and "Shara Raat".

== Later years ==
Arunendu always preferred referring to his songs as "Chhoy Taarer Gaan" (Songs for Six Strings), as the main inspiration behind writing them was to marry light Bengali songs with the strumming and picking of guitar strings to be in line with the popular songs of the 1960s and 1970s that were prevalent in the international market. In 2004, a CD of some of his songs Arundaar Gaan was released by Presto Studio at Kolkata. He appeared only in a live performance at Kolkata in 2013.

A short documentary "Le Pocha" by Qaushiq Mukherjee which talks about Bengali alternative music refers to Arunendu as a pioneer of alternative music in Bengali.

Arunendu died at the age of 81 on 3 February 2019 in London.

== Discography ==
- Arundar Gaan (2004, Private album by Studio Presto)

All lyrics are written by Arunendu Das; all music is composed by Arunendu Das.

No.	Title	Length
1.	"Dishehara Je Mor Man" (from Maya (1997))	3:26
2.	"Gaane Gaane Galpe"	1:58
3.	"Aamar Priya"	2:35
4.	"Kuhu Kuhu Dake"	2:28
5.	"Kete Gache Kato Na Bachor"	2:27
6.	"Bolo Tobuo Ki Royechhe"	4:13
7.	"Mane Ki Porey"	2:11
8.	"Keno Kandi"	3:41
9.	"Eshechhe Sarat"	2:50
10.	"Majhe Majhe Mor"	3:18
11.	"Manbona Aami"	2:43
12.	"Se Bhebechhilo"	3:11
13.	"Chupe Chupe Esho"	2:57
14.	"Se Bhebechhilo"	3:11
15.	"Jas Kotha Tui" (as "Kisher Eto Tara" from Jhora Somoyer Gaan (1996))	2:51
16.	"Dekhechho Ki Kobhu"	3:54
17.	"Aamar Ginni"	2:26
18.	"Besh Tobe Jao"	2:16
19.	"Ki Lav Kende"	3:22
20.	"Janate Jato Chai" ("Tai Janai Gaaney" from Khyapar Gaan (1999))	3:14
21.	"Bhola Jay Sob"	2:41
22.	"Maago Tomay"	3:46
Total length:		1:04:22

=== Moheener Ghoraguli edited albums ===
- Aabaar Bochhor Kuri Pore (1995)
  - "Ganga" (writer)
- Jhora Somoyer Gaan (1996)
  - "Kisher Eto Tara" (lyrics & music)
  - "Ke Ke Jabi Re" (lyrics & music)
  - "Saara Raat" (lyrics & music)
- Maya (1997)
  - "Dishehara Je Mor Man" (lyrics & music)
  - "Bhikhetei Jabo" (lyrics & music)
- Khyapar Gaan (1999)
  - "Tai Janai Gaaney" (lyrics & music)

=== Singles ===
- "Aaey Re Ghum Aai"
- "Aache Mor Kichu Sur"
- "Aage Jaanle Ki Habul"
- "Baar Baar Tumi"
- "Bon Pahadir"
- "Bolte Ja Chao"
- "Dheer Shamiran Aro Dheere Bohe Jao"
- "Gaan Hoye Jai Aaj"
- "Ghumaore Neela"
- "Kakhono Bosay bhabi"
- "Kamona Bashana Jato"
- "Klanti Jarano Akasher Chokhe"
- "Miche Kede"
- "Ore Aamar Man"
- "Purnima Chand"
- "Shiwli Phontar"
- "Somoy Ketechhay Moar Sudhu Abelaye"
- "Tabe Kemone Balo" (2006; Bengali version of Ralph McTell's 1969 song "Streets of London")

=== Live ===
- Chhoy Taarer Gaan (2013; with Prabir Das, Prasanta De, Ranjit Ganguly, and Subrata Ghosh)
  - "Ki Labh Kende" (Based on Richard Fariña's "Pack Up Your Sorrows")

== Notes ==
1. Transliteration from Bengali "Bangla Band ebong Arunendu Das" (Band singing mainly in Bengali and their relation with Arunendu Das)
2. Times of India, Calcutta Times section, 23 August 2002 published an article on Arunendu Das written by Himadri Sekhar Chowdhury with title "The First Urban Minstrel" where he quoted words of late Gautam Chattopadhyay, "Arun-da is an urban minstrel whose songs blossomed before all of us, even before Mohiner Ghoraguli".
3. In the booklet distributed along with their album Aabaar Bochhor Kuri Pore Mohiner Ghoraguli founder member Ranjon Ghoshal refers Arunendu Das as the predecessor to them. Also, in the booklet distributed along with their concert "Aabar Bochhor Tirish Pore" (Once again, after 30 years) held in Nicco Park, Kolkata 2008, Moheener Ghoraguli founder member Pradip Chatterjee remembers Arunendu Das as one of their inspirations.
4. Ekak Matra (Single beat), a popular magazine published from Kolkata, featured an interview with Arunendu Das in their 2004 November issue where he spoke about his life and introduction to guitar playing.
5. The Telegraph (UK), 3 January 2003, featured an article by Sudeshna Banerjee where Arunendu Das jammed with former members of Mohiner Ghoraguli for an Indian popular chatshow "Addachakra" (circle of chit-chat).
6. Collaboration with Kolkata's Bluegrass Band, No Strings Attached, led by Diptanshu Roy. Selected songs to be arranged and recorded in Bluegrass Style. The EP to be called Bongrass. https://bluegrasstoday.com/bluegrass-beyond-borders-no-strings-attached-bridge-appalachia-and-india/
