= Janwar Aur Insaan =

Jaanwar Aur Insaan
- Directed by: Chanakya
- Written by: Inder Raj Anand
- Screenplay by: Sandow M. M. A. Chinnappa Thevar
- Story by: Sandow M. M. A. Chinnappa Thevar
- Produced by: Sandow M. M. A. Chinnappa Thevar
- Starring: Shashi Kapoor; Raakhee; Sujit Kumar; Madan Puri; Jagdeep; Nirupa Roy
- Cinematography: T. M. Sundara Babu
- Edited by: M. G. Balu Rao; P. Babu; R. Thyagarajan
- Music by: Kalyanji–Anandji
- Production company: Dhandayuthapani Films
- Distributed by: Dhandayuthapani Films
- Release date: 1972
- Running time: 154 mins
- Country: India
- Language: Hindi

Jaanwar aur Insaan ("Animal and Man") is a 1972 Hindi movie directed by Tapi Chanakya. The film stars Shashi Kapoor, Raakhee, Sujit Kumar, Jagdeep, Nirupa Roy and Madan Puri. The music is by Kalyanji–Anandji.

== Plot ==
Shekhar lives a wealthy lifestyle with in widowed mother, Gauri, his Jamuna Nagar, India and manages an estate. The region is being terrorized by a tiger which was wounded by him and has since become even more fearless and a man-eater. Shekhar's attempts to entrap and kill it are all in vain. Then Shekhar meets with Meena and both fall in love with each. Their marriage cannot take place as Meena's father, Gokuldas, had killed Shekhar's dad. But when Mohan kills Gokuldas, the past is forgiven and the couple are allowed to get married. The marriage ceremony is marred with the appearance of the tiger, which runs away after being chased by a rifle-toting Shekhar. After about a year Meena gives birth to Raju but the tiger continues to be at large. When the tiger breaks into Shekhar's mansion, a frantic Shekhar decides to not return home until he kills it. He sets up a bait but the tiger refuses to fall for it. While Shekhar is waiting for the tiger to take the bait, it attacks and kills estate workers, compelling Shekhar to seek a human bait. When no one volunteers, Shekhar takes the matter into his own hands and decides to use Raju as a live bait for this man-eater!!

== Cast ==
- Shashi Kapoor ... Shekhar
- Rakhee Gulzar ... Meena (as Raakhee)
- Shabnam ... Champakali
- Sujit Kumar ... Mohan
- Devar ... Real Estate Agent
- Jagdeep ... Bahadur
- Madan Puri ... Gokuldas
- Nirupa Roy ... Gauri
- Alankar Joshi ... Raju (as Master Alankar)

== Soundtrack ==
Lyrics written by Indeevar and Gulshan Bawra. The music is by Kalyanji–Anandji.

1. "Jaane Mujhe Kya Hua" - Kishore Kumar and Lata Mangeshkar
2. "Mujhe Aisi Mili Hasina" - Kishore Kumar
3. "Aao Milke Saathi Banke Khele" - Sushma Shreshtha
4. "Jeevan Ek Path Hai" - Kishore Kumar and Lata Mangeshkar
5. "Mere Sapnon Mein Ek Soorat Hai" - Lata Mangeshkar
