= Antara Chowdhury =

Indian singer and composer

- Born: Antara; 2 June 1970 (age 56); Mumbai, India
- Origin: Mumbai, India
- Genre: Modern Indian music
- Occupations: Singer, composer, music teacher, songwriter
- Years active: 1977–present
- Labels: Inreco, Saregama, Megaphone, Times Music, Asha Audio, Atlantis
- Website: antaramusic.com
- Parents: Salil Chowdhury (father); Sabita Chowdhury (mother)

Antara Chowdhury (born 2 June 1970, in Mumbai, India) is an Indian singer and composer. She is the daughter of the late renowned Composer and Poet Salil Chowdhury and the famous singer Late Sabita Chowdhury. She started singing at the age of 7. Her first playback was in the Hindi film 'Minoo' along with greats like Manna Dey and Asha Bhonsle. Songs like 'Teri galiyon mein hum aaye', a duet with Manna Dey, and a solo 'O Kali Re Kali Re' became very popular.

She is trained in both Indian and Western Classical music and has assisted her father in many Hindi TV serials, including Charitraheen, Kurukshetra and Daraar.

Antara has sung numerous children's songs in Bengali to her credit namely 'Bulbul Pakhi Moyena Tiye',' O Shona Bang,' O Ayere Chhute Aaye',' Ek Je Chhilo Machhi' and many, others all composed and written by her legendary father which created a history in the field of children's songs in Bengal in the late 70's.

Antara has released 2 Hindi albums namely 'Madhur Smriti' from Times Music (solo) and 'Man Ke Manjeere' from Virgin Music (duet with Shubha Mudgal). Her last solo Bengali album 'Generations' released in 2007 by Times Music was highly appreciated. This album consisted of songs by her late father Salil Chowdhury, and her brother Sanjoy Chowdhury's new compositions.

She has also sung a duet with Sonu Nigam in the Hindi film 'Khoya Khoya Chand' called 'Ye Nigahen' composed by Shantanu Moitra which has become very popular. A few years back, her duet with famous Bengali singer, Srikanto Acharya called 'Muthor Rumaal' for the Bengali film 'Antoheen' was widely appreciated.

Antara has sung a solo in the Golden Peacock Award-winning film 'Moner Manush' directed by Gautam Ghose. Her song 'Shopto Tala Bhed Korile' has been written by the legendary Lalon Fakir and composed by Gautam Ghosh himself.

Antara aims to preserve her father's legacy through the Salil Chowdhury Foundation of Music Trust and has published a book called 'Salil Rachana Shangraha' along with her mother Late Sabita Chowdhury and music collector Ranabir Neogi from Dey's publishing in 2013. This is a total compilation of Salil Chowdhury's Bengali songs.

Recently, Antara sung a beautiful song in the award-winning film 'Shankhachil' directed by Gautam Ghose based on Jibonananda Das's famous poem 'Shankhachil'. The song is 'Abar Ashibo Phire'.

She has also recorded a children's song for the upcoming Bengali animation film 'Budhhu Bhutum' directed by Nitish Roy and music composed by Surojit Chatterjee, which is yet to be release.

Antara has performed extensively in many parts of the world, like the USA, UK, Canada, Australia, Bangladesh and all over India.

At present, she has opened her own music school called 'Surodhwoni' in Kolkata which aims at teaching her father's music to the next generation.

== Discography ==
=== Solo albums ===
- Bengali Nursery Songs (1976)
- Surjer Khonje (2000)
- Kitty and Cat (2006)
- Generations: Esho Boshona (2009)
- Miti Miti Tarara
- Esho Boshona
- Chale Ayona / So Far Away
- Kyon Beheke Hain / Stranger – Hindi Single

=== Collaboration albums ===
- Kothay O Sur-e
- Goon Goon Goon Goon Saradin (1980)
- Aabaar Bochhor Kuri Pore (1995)

=== Background Score Composer ===
- Ennu Swantham Janakikutty (1998)

=== Composer ===
- Ingane Oru Nilapakshi (2000)

=== Singer ===
- Suno Na.. Ek Nanhi Aawaz (2009)
