= Ingane Oru Nilapakshi =

- Directed by: Anil–Babu
- Written by: Shathrughnan
- Produced by: Sargam Kabeer
- Starring: Kunchacko Boban; Sneha; Sangeetha; Sujitha
- Cinematography: Prakash Kutti
- Music by: Sanjoy–Antara
- Production company: Sargam Speed Productions
- Release date: 5 May 2000
- Country: India
- Language: Malayalam

Ingane Oru Nilapakshi (transl. A moonlight bird like this) is a 2000 Indian Malayalam-language romantic drama film directed by Anil–Babu and starring Kunchako Boban, Sneha (credited as Manasi), Sangeetha (credited as Rasika) and Sujitha. The film was a box office failure. The film marks the debut of actress Sneha.

== Cast ==
- Kunchacko Boban as Charlie
- Sneha as Manasi
- Sangeetha as Sangeetha
- Sujitha as Uma
- Srividya as Subhadra Thampuratti
- Kalabhavan Mani as Moideen
- Thilakan as R. K. Nair
- Jagathy Sreekumar as Srinivas
- Jagadish as Adiyodi
- Subair as Sudhakaran
- Zeenath as Vijayan's mother
- Sanjoy Chowdhury
- Antara Chowdhury
- Irshad
- Sudhakar Vasanth

== Production ==
Dubai-based Sneha (known at the time as Suhasini), aged nineteen, was spotted by Fazil who recommended her to Anil–Babu who were looking for an actress to play the role of an aspiring dancer. She was renamed Manasi since there was already an actress named Suhasini. Sneha received offers to work in Tamil and Telugu-language films before she had finished the shoot of this film.

== Soundtrack ==
The music was composed by Sanjoy and Antara Chowdhury. Yusufali Kechery worked as the lyricist for this film.

Song	Singer(s)
"Broohi Krishna Ghana Shyama"	K. S. Chithra
"Chellakkaatte Mullathayyinu Maala"	M. G. Sreekumar
"Gaanasumnagal"	K. S. Chithra
"Kanmani Raadhe"	K. J. Yesudas
"Oru Chandamulla Painkiliyen"	K. J. Yesudas
"Oru Chandanamulla Painkiliyen [Duet]"	K. J. Yesudas, K. S. Chithra
"Oru Panchavarnappainkiliyen"	P. Jayachandran
"Paathiravum Poonilaavum"	K. J. Yesudas
"Shivaranjinee O Priyasakhee"	K. S. Chithra
"Sringaara Krishna"	K. S. Chithra
"Unaroohridaya"	K. J. Yesudas, K. S. Chithra

== Reception ==
A critic from indiainfo.com rated the film 3/5 and wrote that "Kunchacko Boban, who has so far been used by directors to do desi rap, gets a chance to perform classical dance in the film. And does a fine job too though its unlikely that the audience will take a liking to it. His sensitive portrayal of a man caught between his love for dance and music and a girl who dotes on him is excellent. Sujitha, the child artiste who was discovered by Fazil in Poovinu Puthiya Poonthennal, gives a very fine performance. This film has some very good music by Sanjay-Antra, the son-daughter duo of Salil Chowdury and the choreography by Kala is impressive. Debutant Manasi manages an average performance". A critic from keralatalkies.com wrote that "With riveting performances, Ingane Oru Nilapakshi holds forth promise".
