= Shubho Mahurat =

- DVD cover
- Directed by: Rituparno Ghosh
- Written by: Agatha Christie (story); Rituparno Ghosh (screenplay)
- Starring: Sharmila Tagore; Raakhee; Nandita Das; Tota Roy Chowdhury; Sumanta Mukherjee; Anindya Chatterjee
- Cinematography: Avik Mukhopadhyay
- Edited by: Arghyakamal Mitra
- Music by: Debojyoti Mishra
- Release date: 2003
- Running time: 150 minutes
- Country: India
- Language: Bengali

Shubho Mahurat is a 2003 Indian Bengali mystery thriller film directed by Rituparno Ghosh. The film is based on Agatha Christie's 1962 Miss Marple detective novel The Mirror Crack'd from Side to Side. Its ensemble cast includes Sharmila Tagore, Rakhee Gulzar, Nandita Das, Tota Roy Chowdhury, Anindya Chatterjee, Moumita Gupta and Rajesh Sharma. It won two National Film awards, those of Best Feature film in Bengali and Best Supporting Actress for Rakhee.

== Plot ==
The phrase "Shubho Mahurat" (Bengali: শুভ মহরৎ) is associated with the beginning of shooting for a feature film. The first shot is marked by a grand reception.

An NRI producer and former leading actress, Padmini Chowdhury, has returned to India to invest in a film. Her second husband Sambit Roy, an out-of-work director, is assigned to direct. Padmini insists on casting a retired actress, Kakoli Sengupta, in a prominent role. Covering the event are a journalist for a local magazine, Mallika Sen, and a freelance photographer, Shubhankar Chowdhury. The production team also includes makeup artist Kalpana Sengupta and camera assistant Sunil Mehra.

At the reception, Kakoli feels unwell and leaves early. She takes Mallika home with her after agreeing to do an interview. At her house, however, Kakoli's condition deteriorates until she collapses and dies. Learning from her husband that she was a drug addict, police suspect an overdose, but the autopsy reveals strychnine poisoning. Investigating officer Arindam Chatterjee initially suspects the husband, who is in an extramarital affair, but the poison is found to have entered her system while she was at the reception event. Mallika reveals that Kakoli only had a glass of soft drink at the party, and the drink was actually meant for Padmini. Mallika discusses all this with her paternal aunt, Ranga Pishima, who conjectures that another murder might soon follow. Meanwhile, a mutual attraction develops between both Mallika-Arindam and Mallika-Shubhankar. Pishima discovers that Shubhankar is actually related to Padmini: his uncle was Padmini's first husband, and she doted on Shubhankar when he was a child.

Kalpana tells Padmini about her relationship with Sunil, who is married, and how Sunil had refused to pay for the treatment of Kalpana's daughter. Padmini promises to help her, and tells her about her own son, who died aged 16 from a congenital disorder. Kalpana then goes to Sunil's, is seen leaving after having some soft drink, and is later reported dead. Sunil is arrested.

Pishima listens to the recordings of Mallika's interview with Kakoli, questions Shubhankar further about Padmini, then asks Mallika to call up the director of Kakoli and Padmini's last film together. She then places an anonymous piece in her niece's magazine, which is about whether infections during pregnancy can harm the unborn child, in the edition which is to carry Padmini's interview with Mallika. A copy is sent to Padmini with the page highlighted. This has the desired effect as Padmini rushes to Pishima and Mallika's home to enquire about the piece, and Pishima narrates to her how she has solved the mystery.

During their last film together, Padmini was pregnant and Kakoli had a contagious disease, which she spread to her co-actress. This infection was transmitted to the unborn child, which would later lead to his death. Padmini poisoned Kakoli in revenge, but was seen by Kalpana, who tried to blackmail her and was silenced in turn.

Pishima tells Padmini that she is her fan and her story is safe with her. Padmini returns home and is later found to have committed suicide. As per her last promise, she sends Pishima an autograph and a long reply to her fan mail, in which she also promises to support the treatment of Kalpana's daughter.

Conflicted between Arindam and him, Mallika asks Shubhankar if it is possible to love two people at once. Shubhankar replies that Padmini had once said the same thing before she left his uncle for Sambit. He also says that Padmini proved it herself that this was impossible: she had completely forgotten about Shubhankar after her son was born, to the point that she could not recognise him at the reception.

== Cast ==
- Sharmila Tagore as Padmini 'Ranu' Chowdhury
- Raakhee as Ranga Pishima (Character based on Miss Marple)
- Nandita Das as Mallika 'Mili' Sen
- Tota Roy Chowdhury as Arindam Chatterjee, IPS
- Sumanta Mukherjee as Sambit Roy
- Kalyani Mandal as Kakoli Sengupta
- Kaushik Banerjee as Pranabesh Sengupta, Kakoli's husband
- Rajesh Sharma as Sunil Mehra
- Aparajita Adhya as Pramila Mehra, Sunil's wife
- Moumita Gupta as Kalpana Sengupta
- Anindya Chatterjee as Shubhankar 'Jojo' Chowdhury
- Abhijit Guha (special appearance)
- Goutam Ghose (special appearance)
- Soumitra Chattopadhyay (special appearance)
- Subhendu Chattopadhyay (special appearance)
- Madhabi Mukherjee (special appearance)

== Awards ==
- 2003 – National Film Award for Best Supporting Actress for Rakhee
- 2003 – National Film Award for Best Feature Film in Bengali
