= Lakkhichhara =

Indian Hard Rock Band

Lakkhichhara লক্ষীছাড়া
- Origin: Kolkata, West Bengal, India
- Genres: Bangla Rock, Rock, Hard rock, Blues
- Years active: 1999–present
- Label: Asha Audio
- Members: Rajiv Mitra; Bodhisattwa Ghosh; Sanket Bhattacharya; Debaditya Chaudhury; Gaurab Chatterjee; Anyrvan
- Past members: Nilanjan Mukherjee; Subhajit Mukherjee, Sujay Dutta; Sayok Bandyopadhyay; Rishabh Ray
- Website: www.lakkhichhara.com

Lakkhichhara (Bengali: লক্ষ্মীছাড়া) is a rock band, based in Kolkata, West Bengal, India. The band was formed in 1999 and started their professional journey by performing in college fests, hotels and pubs.

== History ==
In 2001 they recorded their debut album. The album was not commercially successful but some major hits like "Care Korina" and "Shudhu Chai Tomay" were featured on radio channels in Kolkata. In December 2001, the lead vocalist Sayak Bandopadhyay left the band. Subhajit Mukherjee joined the band after he met the band in a school fest, and showed interest in working with them.

In 2003 they recorded their second studio album - Jibon Chaichhe Aro Besi.

In 2004, Rishabh Ray joined the band and later recorded a new album in 2005 named Eka, the album was a huge success. Lead guitarist Nilanjan, departed for personal commitments, and was replaced by Bua soon after. He rejoined the band in 2012 as Sujay bid goodbye. Subhajit shifted to Mumbai to try the possibilities in the national scene which paved way for Sayak to rejoin the band.

The members of the band appeared as judges on "Hau Mau Khau", a game show on Zee Bangla TV, Band-E-Mataram (I & II), and "Rock Idols" along with numerous college fests. They have released their latest EP "Ek Doshok Por" in June, 2023.

== Band members ==
- Rajiv Mitra - Vocalist
- Bodhisatwa Ghosh - Lead Guitarist
- Sanket Bhattacharya - Bassist
- Debaditya Chowdhury - Keyboardist
- Gaurab Chatterjee - Drummer & Backing Vocals
- Anyrvan Mazumder - Lyricist

== Music style ==
They started playing as a soft rock band in the year of formation but gradually changed to rock and hard rock, and then finally becoming Kolkata's first ever progressive rock band.

=== Major influences ===
Def Leppard, Van Halen, The Who, Mötley Crüe, Pink Floyd, Led Zeppelin, Deep Purple, Whitesnake, Winger, Dream Theater, Yes, Collective Soul, Steve Vai, White Lion, Foreigner, Prodigy, Sting, The Police, Steve Vai, Extreme, Megadeth, Beatles, The Doors, Pearl Jam, Pantera, Pain of Salvation, Bob Marley, Winger, Queensrÿche, Coldplay, Bon Jovi, Red Hot Chili Peppers, Weather Report.

== Studio albums ==
Since inception they have recorded four studio albums and released many singles, they have also composed for the anthem song for ICL Team Royal Bengal Tigers.

== Megh Mallar (2001) ==
Megh Mallar was their first album which they recorded with Asha Audio Company in 2001. The album was not a huge success but many hits like "Care Korina" and "Shudhu Chai Tomay" were featured on radio channels in Kolkata.

=== Track listing ===
- "Megh Mallar"
- "Care Kori Na"
- "Mahabiswo"
- "Bare Bare Tobu"
- "Parashonae Jalanjali"
- "Rat Be-raate"
- "Bismritir Canvas"
- "Sunya Raat"
- "Shudhu Chai Tomay"
- "Kemon Acho Shohor"

== "Jibon chaichhe aro besi" (2003) ==
Their second studio album with Asha Audio Company which released in 2003. This album consisted of some bonus tracks which were the remake of some songs from their previous album Megh Mallar.

=== Track listing ===
- "Jibon Chaichhe Aro Besi"
- "Balerina"
- "Mone Porchhe Na"
- "Bhalobasbo Na To Ar"
- "Lakkhichhara"
- "Sonali"
- "Amar Satso Sakal"
- "Niruddeshe"
- "Ballroome Ekdin"
- "E Ki Kotha Shuni Hai"

=== Bonus tracks ===
- "Porashonay Jalanjali"
- "Bare Bare Tobu Ashtei hobe fiery"
- "Care kori na"
- "He Mohabiswo"

== "Eka" (2005) ==
The third studio album was released in the year 2005 and had been a huge success. They have sold 1,600 copies in Kolkata.

=== Track listing ===
- "Ke Ki Bole"
- "Firee Eso"
- "Ami Raaji"
- "Harate Chai Na Abar"
- "Boba Festun"
- "Eka"
- "Palie Berai"
- "Achhi Sobsomoy"
- "Jani Na"
- "Proshno"

== "Bisesh Bisesh Ongsho Birotir Por" (2009) ==
=== Track listing ===
- "Bishonno Drishtipate"
- "Raatrir Arale"
- "Shotti"
- "E Shomoy"
- "Bhebe Dekho"
- "Ami"
- "Ki Pore Achhe Aar"
- "Bujhte Parini"
- "Ki Lekha Achhe Sheshe"

== Collaboration albums ==
- Aabaar Bochhor Kuri Pore (1995)
- Maya (1997)
