= Sabita Chowdhury =

Indian singer (1940s–2017)

- Born: 1944 or 1945
- Died: 29 June 2017 (aged 72); Kolkata, India
- Occupation: Singer
- Spouse: Salil Chowdhury
- Children: 4 (including Antara Chowdhury)

Sabita Chowdhury (1944 or 1945 – 29 June 2017) was an Indian singer.

== Personal life ==
Sabita Chowdhury was born in 1944 or 1945. Married to Salil Chowdhury, they had two daughters (Antara and Sanchari) and two sons (Sanjoy and Bobby) before his death. Sabita Chowdhury died of lung cancer in Kolkata on 29 June 2017, aged 72. Her body lay in repose at Rabindra Sadan.

== Career ==
Singing in Bengali and Hindi, Chowdhury also performed playback for films. Some of her more famous songs are "Du chokhey aashaar nodi chhalachhal", "Jaare jaa jaa mono paakhi", and "Oi jhilmil jhauer boney".
