= Rakhee Gulzar =

Indian film actress (born 1947)

Rakhee
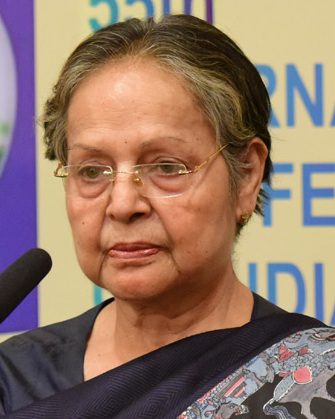
- Rakhee in 2024
- Born: Rakhee Majumdar; 15 August 1947 (age 79); Ranaghat, West Bengal, Dominion of India (present-day Republic of India)
- Occupation: Actress
- Years active: 1967–present
- Spouse: Ajay Biswas (m. 1963; div. 1965) Gulzar (m. 1973; sep. 1974)
- Children: Meghna Gulzar (daughter)
- Honors: Padma Shri

Raakhee Gulzar (Bengali pronunciation: [rakʰi]; née Majumdar; born 15 August 1947), professionally known as Raakhee, is an Indian actress who primarily works in Hindi and Bengali films. One of the leading and greatest actresses of the 1970s and early 1980s, Raakhee is a recipient of several awards including two National Film Awards and three Filmfare Awards. In 2003, she received Padma Shri, India's fourth-highest civilian award.

Raakhee made her film debut with the Bengali film Badhu Bharan (1967). She had her first Hindi film with Jeevan Mrityu (1970). Raakhee's career marked a turning point with Aankhon Aankhon Mein (1972), Daag: A Poem of Love (1973), for which she won her first Filmfare Award for Best Supporting Actress, and 27 Down (1974). She won her first and only Filmfare Award for Best Actress for Tapasya (1976).

Raakhee went on to establish herself as one of the leading and greatest actresses of Hindi cinema with films like - Blackmail (1973), Kabhi Kabhie (1976), Doosra Aadmi (1977), Trishna, Muqaddar Ka Sikandar (both 1978), Kaala Patthar, Jurmana (both 1979), Barsaat Ki Ek Raat (1981), Shakti (1982), Ram Lakhan (1989), for which she won her second Filmfare Award for Best Supporting Actress, Baazigar (1993), Karan Arjun (1995), Border (1997), Ek Rishtaa: The Bond of Love (2001) and Shubho Mahurat (2003). For the last of these, she won the National Film Award for Best Supporting Actress.

Raakhee married poet, lyricist and author Gulzar in 1973 with whom she has a daughter, writer and director Meghna Gulzar.

== Early life ==
Raakhee was born in a Bengali family at Ranaghat in the Nadia district of West Bengal on 15 August 1947. She received her early education in a local girls' school. Her father had a flourishing shoe business in his native village located in Meherpur, Bangladesh which was then a part of Nadia district of undivided India (modern-day Bangladesh), before the partition of India, and thereafter he settled in West Bengal.

== Career ==
=== Early work and breakthrough (1967–1975) ===
In 1967, the 20-year-old Raakhee acted in her first Bengali film Bodhu Boron and Baghini, after which she was offered the lead role in Rajshri Productions' successful crime thriller Jeevan Mrityu (1970) opposite Dharmendra.

In 1971 Raakhee played a double role opposite Shashi Kapoor in the musical romance Sharmeelee, and also starred in the dramas Lal Patthar and Paras; all three films emerged as commercial successes and she quickly established herself as a leading actress of Hindi Cinema. Shehzada (1972) opposite Rajesh Khanna and Aankhon Aankhon Mein (1972) opposite a relative newcomer Rakesh Roshan showcased her comic abilities, though their box office returns was unsatisfactory. In 1973, she continued to display versatility even in relatively small roles in the romances Heera Panna and Daag: A Poem of Love, with her strong performances, earning her first Filmfare Award for Best Supporting Actress for the latter. In 1974, Raakhee won a Special Souvenir prize at the National Film Awards for 27 Down. The Telegraph commended her "nuanced take on an independent working woman who has more steel in her than the film’s flawed protagonist – truly a break from the synthetic women in films of the era".

=== Widespread success and critical acclaim (1976–1984) ===
In 1976, Raakhee's career peaked after starring in two movies that garnered her widespread acclaim. The first was Yash Chopra's Kabhi Kabhie, for which she earned her second Filmfare Award for Best Actress nomination. The film had been written with Raakhee in mind, and she had agreed to do it during the making of Daag. Citing her as having "one of the most gorgeous faces to have been seen on the Hindi screen", Filmfare magazine retrospectively called it "a perfect ode to her exquisiteness: Her wine eyes, a prism of myriad emotions. Her poignant voice holding back the surging sadness. She played the beautiful muse, whose parting leaves poet Amitabh Bachchan devastated. [The film] threw open a second innings for the actress who then went on to star in blockbusters that left critics overwhelmed and art house actors envious. From initially being compared to actress Nimmi, given her hazel eyes, and later to Meena Kumari, given her proclivity towards the tragic, Raakhee cut through it all to stand apart".

The phenomenal success of Rajshri Productions' Tapasya (1976), a heroine-dominated drama, established Raakhee as a box-office name to reckon with. Starring opposite Asrani and Parikshit Sahni, her portrayal of a family breadwinner who sacrifices her dreams and ambitions for the future of her younger siblings, earned Raakhee her first and only Filmfare Award for Best Actress. The Hindu acknowledged her role as a "calculated risk", which required her to be shown in a "mature, somewhat middle aged role", and praised her "amazing restraint and conviction" in it. She later described the film as "one of the most important films of my career" and regards her performances in Blackmail (1973), Tapasya and Aanchal (1980) as her best.

Raakhee starred with Dev Anand in Heera Panna, Banarasi Babu (1973), Joshila (1973) and Lootmaar (1980). She starred opposite Shashi Kapoor in 10 released films: Sharmeelee, Jaanwar Aur Insaan (1972), Kabhie Kabhie (1976), Doosra Aadmi (1977), the critically acclaimed Trishna (1978), Baseraa (1981), Bandhan Kuchchey Dhaagon Ka (1983), Zameen Aasmaan (1984), and Pighalta Aasman (1985) and the unreleased Ek Do Teen Chaar. Her exemplary chemistry with Amitabh Bachchan was showcased in eight films: Kabhie Kabhie, Muqaddar Ka Sikander (1978), Kasme Vaade (1978), Trishul (1978), Kaala Patthar (1979), Jurmana (1979), Barsaat Ki Ek Raat (1981), and Bemisal (1982). In some films such as Jurmana, her name is even credited ahead of the hero. She also formed a popular pair with Sanjeev Kumar in films like Hamare Tumhare (1979) and Shriman Shrimati (1982).

In 1981, a 23-year-old aspiring director Anil Sharma asked her to star in an out-and-out female oriented role in his debut film Shradhanjali. After the success of the film, Raakhee was flooded by strong heroine-dominated roles. At the peak of her career as a popular heroine, she surprised everyone by accepting strong character roles as sister-in-law to Rajesh Khanna in Aanchal, Shashi Kapoor and Amitabh in Shaan (1980), Mithun Chakraborty in Dhuan (1981), and mother to Amitabh in Shakti and Rishi Kapoor in Yeh Vaada Raha (1982). She also starred in several Bengali films at the time, with Paroma (1984) earning her the Bengal Film Journalists' Association Award for Best Actress (Hindi).

=== Supporting parts and sporadic work (1985–present) ===
Towards the late 1980s, 1990s and 2000's, she played strong character roles as the elderly mother or a woman of principles in commercially successful films such as Ram Lakhan (1989), Anari (1993), Khalnayak (1993), Baazigar (1993), Karan Arjun (1995), Border (1997), Soldier (1998), Ek Rishtaa: The Bond of Love (2001) and Dil Ka Rishta (2002). In 2003, she appeared in Rituparno Ghosh's mystery thriller Shubho Mahurat, which earned her the National Film Award for Best Supporting Actress. In a 2012 interview, she said that her favourite heroes were Rajesh Khanna and Shashi Kapoor. In 2019, Kolkata International Film Festival the film Nirbon directed by Goutam Halder was premiered, where Raakhee portrayed the role of Bijolibala, a 70 year old lady with a strong conviction. "Doing films is not on my agenda right now, but the story fascinated me" said Raakhee said about the adaptation of Moti Nandi's novel Bijolibalar Mukti.

== Other work ==
Apart from her acting career, Raakhee delved into various other field, some of which include costume designing (for Pyaar To Hona Hi Tha (1998)) and dress assistance (for Dil Kya Kare (1999)). In 1982, she lent her voice for the film Taaqat in the song "Teri Nindiya Ko Lag Jaaye Aag Re" sung alongside Kishore Kumar.

== Personal life ==
Whilst still a teenager, Raakhee had an arranged marriage to Bengali journalist/film director Ajay Biswas, which ended shortly afterwards.

At the start of her film career, she dropped her surname and was mentioned in film credits only as "Raakhee", by which name she attained stardom, but upon marrying lyricist-director Sampooran Singh Kalra, professionally known as Gulzar, she took his pen name as her surname and is credited thereafter as Raakhee Gulzar. The couple has a daughter, Meghna Gulzar. When their daughter was only one year old, they separated.

After completing her graduation in films from New York University, Meghna went on to become a director of films including Filhaal... (2002), Just Married (2007) and Dus Kahaniyaan (2007), and authored a biography of her father in 2004.

At one point, Raakhee stayed in her bungalow, "Muktangan" (bought from the Marathi playwright P. L. Deshpande), on Sarojini Road in Khar, Mumbai. Later, she sold the property and moved to an apartment two buildings away, though the new highrise is still called by the same name, as she had wished. Meghna said in an interview that "My mother has lived her professional and personal life with tremendous dignity and grace". Presently, she lives a reclusive life in her farmhouse at Panvel on the outskirts of Mumbai, spending time in tending to a huge flock of animals, growing vegetables and reading books.

== Filmography ==
| Year | Title | Role | Language | Notes | Ref. |
|---|---|---|---|---|---|
| 1967 | Badhu Bharan | – | Bengali | | |
| 1968 | Baghini | | Bengali | | |
| 1970 | Aparajeya | Bina | Assamese | | |
| 1970 | Jeevan Mrityu | Deepa | Hindi | Hindi debut | |
| 1971 | Sharmilee | Kanchan/Kamini | Hindi | | |
| 1971 | Reshma Aur Shera | Gopal's Wife | Hindi | | |
| 1971 | Paras | Barkha Singh | Hindi | | |
| 1971 | Lal Patthar | Sumita | Hindi | | |
| 1972 | Anokhi Pehchan | | Hindi | | |
| 1972 | Aan Baan | Rekha | Hindi | | |
| 1972 | Aankhon Aankhon Mein | Parvati | Hindi | Nominated – Filmfare Award for Best Actress | |
| 1972 | Beimaan | Sapna | Hindi | | |
| 1972 | Janwar Aur Insaan | Meena | Hindi | | |
| 1972 | Shehzada | Chanda | Hindi | | |
| 1972 | Shaadi Ke Baad | Shova | Hindi | | |
| 1972 | Sub Ka Saathi | Rosie | Hindi | | |
| 1972 | Wafaa | Saraswati | Hindi | | |
| 1972 | Yaar Mera | Sarla | Hindi | | |
| 1973 | Daag: A Poem of Love | Chandni | Hindi | Won – Filmfare Award for Best Supporting Actress | |
| 1973 | Blackmail | Asha Mehta | Hindi | | |
| 1973 | Banarasi Babu | Neela | Hindi | | |
| 1973 | Heera Panna | Reema Singh | Hindi | Special appearance | |
| 1973 | Joshila | Sapna | Hindi | Special appearance | |
| 1974 | Pagli | Gori | Hindi | | |
| 1974 | 27 Down | Shalini | Hindi | Won – National Film Award, Special Souvenir | |
| 1975 | Mere Sajna | Kammo | Hindi | | |
| 1975 | Angaarey | Shova | Hindi | | |
| 1976 | Tapasya | Indrani Sinha (Indu) | Hindi | Won – Filmfare Award for Best Actress | |
| 1976 | Kabhi Kabhie | Pooja Khanna | Hindi | Nominated – Filmfare Award for Best Actress | |
| 1977 | Doosra Aadmi | Nisha | Hindi | Nominated – Filmfare Award for Best Actress & for Best Supporting Actress | |
| 1978 | Chameli Memsaheb | Chameli | Bengali | | |
| 1978 | Trishna | Aarti Gupta | Hindi | Nominated – Filmfare Award for Best Actress | |
| 1978 | Kasme Vaade | Suman | Hindi | | |
| 1978 | Trishul | Geeta | Hindi | | |
| 1978 | Muqaddar Ka Sikandar | Kaamna | Hindi | | |
| 1979 | Hamare Tumhare | Maya | Hindi | | |
| 1979 | Jurmana | Rama Sharma | Hindi | Nominated – Filmfare Award for Best Actress | |
| 1979 | Kaala Patthar | Dr. Sudha Sen | Hindi | | |
| 1979 | Shyamla | | Bengali | | |
| 1980 | Lootmaar | Raksha Bhagat | Hindi | Special appearance | |
| 1980 | Aanchal | Shanti | Hindi | | |
| 1980 | Hum Kadam | Indu Gupta | Hindi | | |
| 1980 | Shaan | Sheetal Kumar | Hindi | | |
| 1981 | Rocky | Parvati | Hindi | | |
| 1981 | Laawaris | Vidya | Hindi | Special appearance | |
| 1981 | Dhuaan | Rani Gayatri | Hindi | | |
| 1981 | Barsaat Ki Ek Raat | Rajni | Bengali-Hindi bilingual | | |
| 1981 | Anusandhan | Tamosha | Bengali-Hindi bilingual | | |
| 1981 | Baseraa | Sharda Balraj Kohli | Hindi | Nominated – Filmfare Award for Best Actress | |
| 1981 | Shradhanjali | Bhabhi maa | Hindi | | |
| 1982 | Yeh Vaada Raha | Sharda Rai Bahadur | Hindi | | |
| 1982 | Taaqat | Devi | Hindi | | |
| 1982 | Shriman Shrimati | Parvati Devi | Hindi | | |
| 1982 | Bemisal | Kavita | Hindi | | |
| 1982 | Dil Aakhir Dil Hai | Kusum Desai | Hindi | | |
| 1982 | Shakti | Sheetal | Hindi | Nominated – Filmfare Award for Best Actress | |
| 1983 | Bandhan Kuchchey Dhaagon Ka | Bhavna | Hindi | | |
| 1984 | Anand Aur Anand | Mrs. Arun Anand | Hindi | | |
| 1984 | Bandh Honth | | Hindi | | |
| 1984 | Parama | Parama | Bengali | | |
| 1984 | Zindagi Jeene Ke Liye | | Hindi | | |
| 1984 | Zameen Aasmaan | Kavita | Hindi | | |
| 1985 | Pighalta Aasman | Aarti | Hindi | | |
| 1985 | Saaheb | Sujata Sharma | Hindi | Nominated – Filmfare Award for Best Supporting Actress | |
| 1986 | Amma | Shanta | Hindi | | |
| 1986 | Zindagani | Sumitra Devi | Hindi | | |
| 1987 | Muqaddar Ka Faisla | Laxmi | Hindi | | |
| 1987 | Dacait | Devi Choudhrain | Hindi | | |
| 1988 | Gold Medal | Shobha/Dimple | Hindi | | |
| 1988 | Mere Baad | Vidya | Hindi | | |
| 1988 | Falak | Durga Verma | Hindi | | |
| 1988 | Prateek | Sunanda | Bengali | | |
| 1988 | Sagar Sangam | Ganga | Hindi | | |
| 1989 | Ram Lakhan | Sharda Pratap Singh | Hindi | Won – Filmfare Award for Best Supporting Actress | |
| 1989 | Santosh | Rachna | Hindi | | |
| 1990 | Jeevan Ek Sangharsh | Dharam Verma | Hindi | | |
| 1991 | Saugandh | Ganga | Hindi | | |
| 1991 | Pratikar | Saraswati Devi | Hindi | | |
| 1993 | Rudaali | Bhikni/Euli | Hindi | | |
| 1993 | Pratimurti | | Bengali | | |
| 1993 | Khal Nayak | Mrs. Aarti Prasad | Hindi | | |
| 1993 | Kshatriya | Maheshwari Devi | Hindi | | |
| 1993 | Dil Ki Baazi | Nirmala Devi | Hindi | | |
| 1993 | Anari | Savitri | Hindi | Nominated – Filmfare Award for Best Supporting Actress | |
| 1993 | Baazigar | Mrs. Shobha Sharma | Hindi | | |
| 1994 | Phiriye Dao | Arjun's mother | Bengali | | |
| 1994 | Swami Vivekananda | Rajasthani tribal | Hindi | | |
| 1995 | Karan Arjun | Durga Singh | Hindi | Nominated – Filmfare Award for Best Supporting Actress | |
| 1995 | Kismat | Geeta | Hindi | | |
| 1996 | Durjan | | Bengali | | |
| 1996 | Jaan | Rukmini | Hindi | | |
| 1997 | Achena Atithi | | Bengali | | |
| 1997 | Border | Dharamvir's mother | Hindi | Nominated – Filmfare Award for Best Supporting Actress | |
| 1997 | Jeevan Yudh | Mrs. Rai | Hindi | | |
| 1997 | Ankhon Mein Tum Ho | Ranimaa (Mrs. Burman) | Hindi | | |
| 1998 | Sham Ghansham | Ganga Satyadev Singh | Hindi | | |
| 1998 | Barood | Gayatri Sharma | Hindi | | |
| 1998 | Soldier | Geeta Malhotra | Hindi | Nominated – Filmfare Award for Best Supporting Actress | |
| 1999 | Baadshah | Chief Minister Gayatri | Hindi | | |
| 2001 | Ek Rishtaa: The Bond of Love | Pratima Kapoor | Hindi | | |
| 2003 | Talaash: The Hunt Begins | Purnima | Hindi | | |
| 2003 | Dil Ka Rishta | Mrs. Sharma | Hindi | | |
| 2003 | Shubho Mahurat | Ranga Pishima | Bengali | National Film Award for Best Supporting Actress | |
| 2009 | Classmates | | Hindi | | |
| 2019 | Nirbaan | Bijolibaba | Bengali | | |
| 2025 | Aamar Boss | | Bengali | | |

== Accolades ==
=== Civilian Award ===
| Year | Award | Category | Result | Ref. |
|---|---|---|---|---|
| 2003 | Padma Shri | Contribution in the field of Arts | Honoured | |

=== Film Awards ===
| Year | Award | Category | Work | Result | Ref. |
|---|---|---|---|---|---|
| 1972 | Filmfare Awards | Best Actress | Aankhon Aankhon Mein | Nominated | |
| 1973 | Filmfare Awards | Best Supporting Actress | Daag: A Poem of Love | Won | |
| 1976 | Filmfare Awards | Best Actress | Kabhi Kabhie | Nominated | |
| 1976 | Filmfare Awards | Best Actress | Tapasya | Won | |
| 1977 | Filmfare Awards | Best Actress | Doosra Aadmi | Nominated | |
| 1977 | Filmfare Awards | Best Supporting Actress | Doosra Aadmi | Nominated | |
| 1978 | Filmfare Awards | Best Actress | Trishna | Nominated | |
| 1979 | Filmfare Awards | Best Actress | Jurmana | Nominated | |
| 1981 | Filmfare Awards | Best Actress | Baseraa | Nominated | |
| 1983 | Filmfare Awards | Best Actress | Shakti | Nominated | |
| 1985 | Filmfare Awards | Best Supporting Actress | Saaheb | Nominated | |
| 1989 | Filmfare Awards | Best Supporting Actress | Ram Lakhan | Won | |
| 1994 | Filmfare Awards | Best Supporting Actress | Anari | Nominated | |
| 1996 | Filmfare Awards | Best Supporting Actress | Karan Arjun | Nominated | |
| 1998 | Filmfare Awards | Best Supporting Actress | Border | Nominated | |
| 1999 | Filmfare Awards | Best Supporting Actress | Soldier | Nominated | |
| 1974 | National Film Awards | Special Souvenir | 27 Down | Won | |
| 2003 | National Film Awards | Best Supporting Actress | Shubho Mahurat | Won | |
| 1973 | Bengal Film Journalists' Association Awards | Best Supporting Actress (Hindi) | Daag | Won | |
| 1984 | Bengal Film Journalists' Association Awards | Best Actress (Hindi) | Paroma | Won | |
