= Hiran Mitra =

Indian artist (born 1945)

Hiran Mitra (born 1945) is an Indian artist based in Kolkata (West Bengal, India).

Mitra left his ancestral country home in Kharagpur to study Fine art in the Government College of Art & Craft, Kolkata at the age of 14. His paintings are energetic abstract gestural paintings with the choreography of the human body observed from folk dance having influenced his recent calligraphic forms . He has contributed significantly to the visual stimulus in eastern Indian films, television, theatre and literature since in the 1980s. He is also known to have defined a benchmark for book cover design for contemporary Bengali literature. Bold brush strokes, layered washes and sprays and unconventional use of acrylic and industrial paints characterize his paintings. He is part of the Open Window Artist group and has been part of the Painters 80 Artist group in Kolkata.
