= Tomb of Salim Chishti =

Mausoleum with tomb of Salim Chishti in Fatehpur Sikri in India

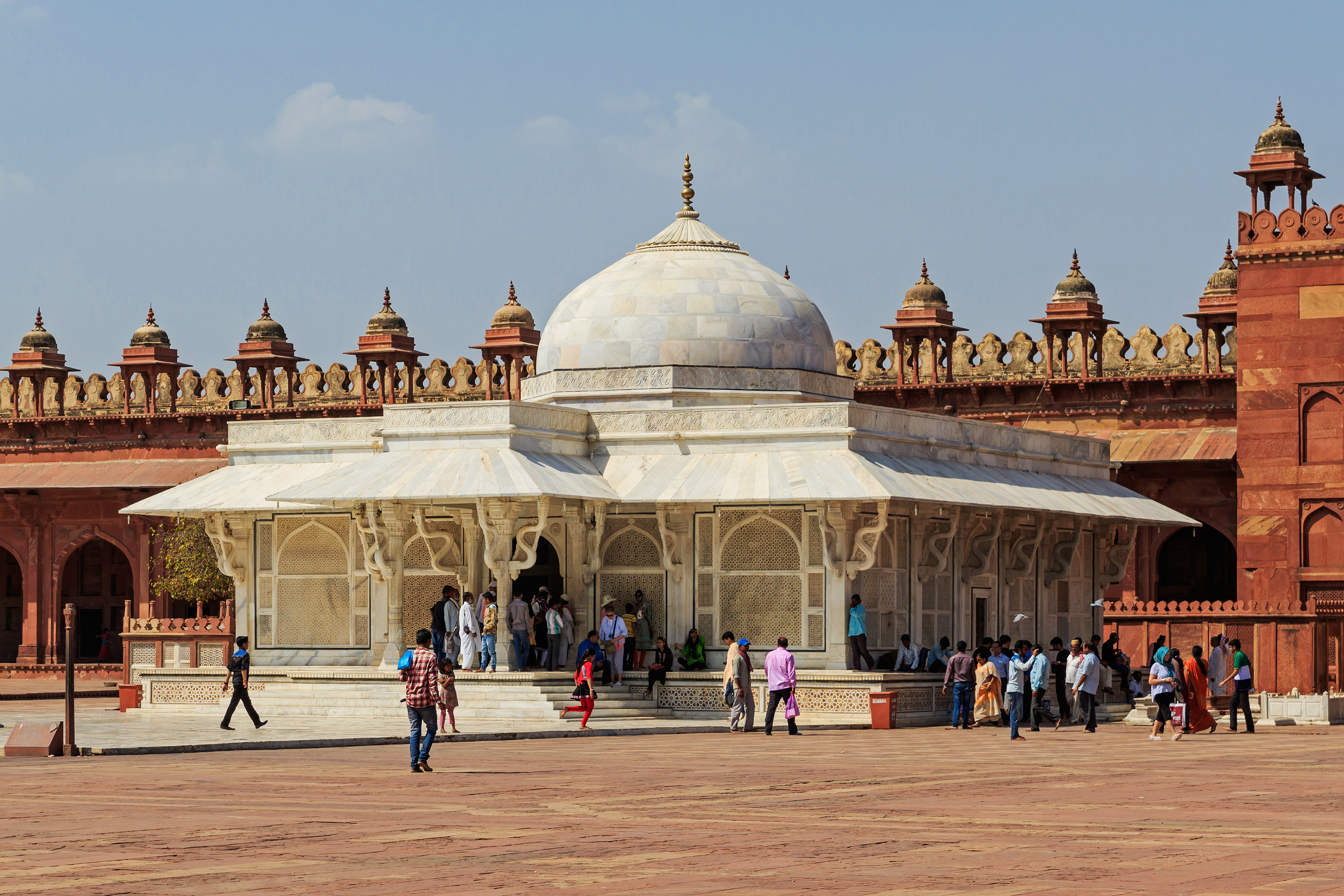
The tomb of Shaikh Salim Chisti is considered to be one of the finest examples of Mughal architecture in India.

The Tomb of Salim Chishti is a mausoleum located within the quadrangle of the Jama Masjid in Fatehpur Sikri, Uttar Pradesh, India. It enshrines the burial place of the Sufi saint Salim Chisti (1478 – 1572), a descendant of Baba Farid, and who lived in a cavern on the ridge at Sikri. Considered one of the finest examples of Mughal architecture in India, the mausoleum was built during the years 1580 and 1581 by Akbar, along with the imperial complex at Fatehpur Sikri near Zenana Rauza. It was constructed as a mark of his respect for Salim Chisti, who foretold the birth of Akbar's son (named Prince Salim after Salim Chisti), who succeeded Akbar to the throne of the Mughal Empire. Along with the Jama Masjid and the old city of Fatehpur Sikri, the tomb was inscribed on the UNESCO World Heritage List in 1986.

== Architecture ==
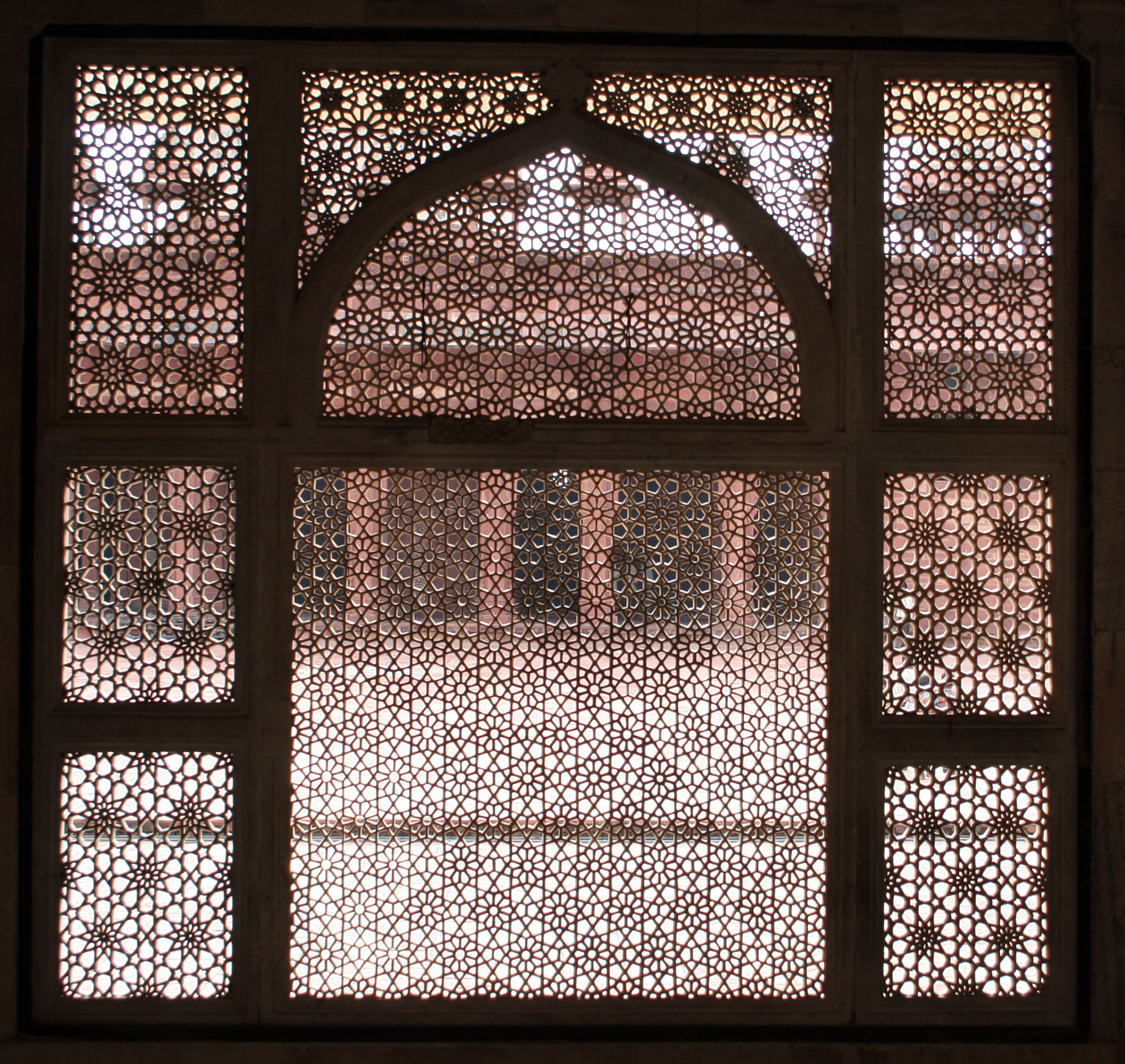
Intricate jali, stone latticework window, looking into the quadrangle of the Jama Masjid

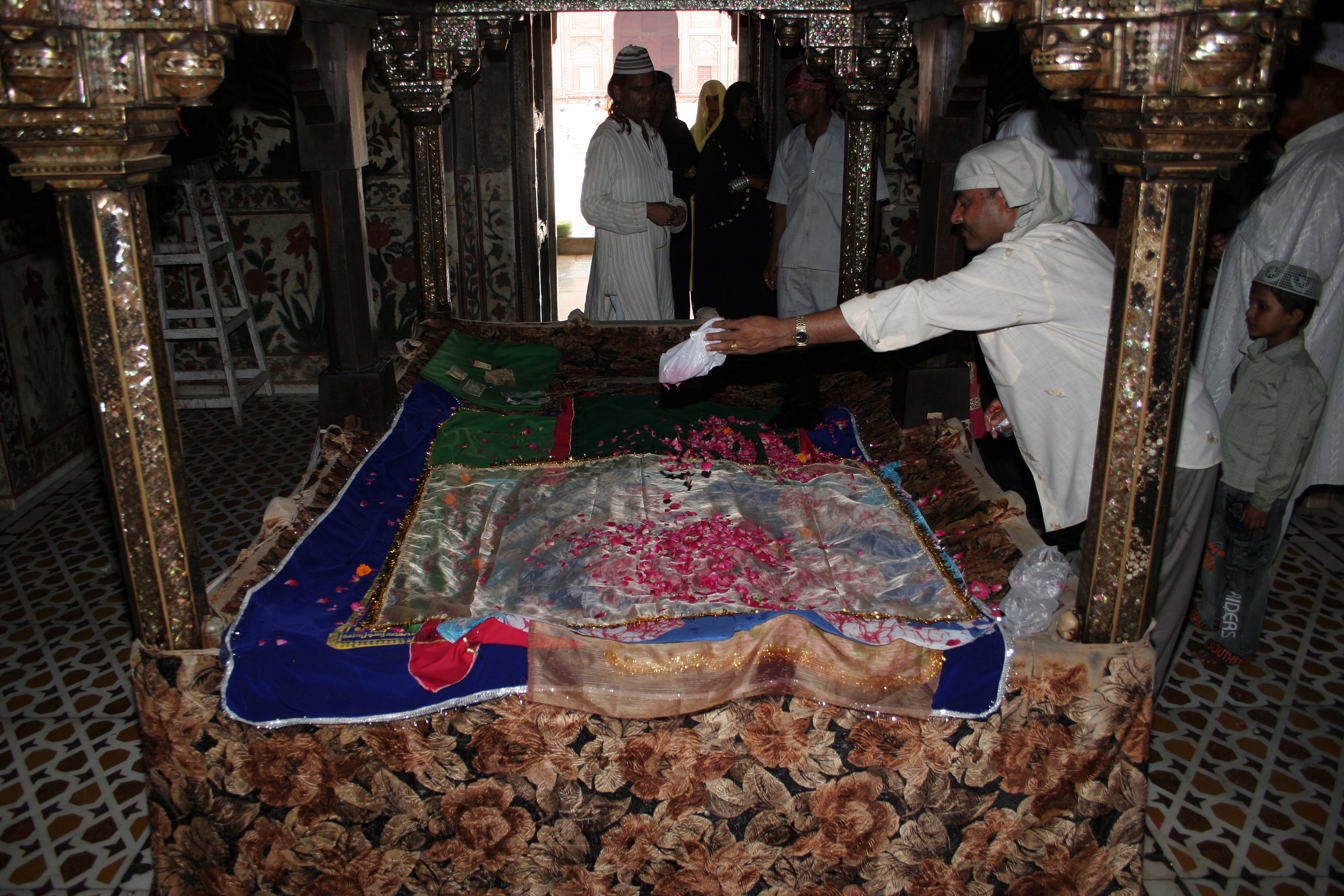
Wooden canopy over the inner tomb, with an inlaid mosaic of mother-of-pearl

The tomb was constructed on a platform that is about 1 metre high with a flight of five steps leading to the entrance portico. The main tomb building is enclosed by delicate marble screens on all sides, and the tomb is located in the centre of the main hall, which has a single semi-circular dome. The marble building is beautifully carved and has an ivory-like appearance. The plinth is ornamented with mosaics of black and yellow marble arranged in geometric patterns. An ebony "chhaparkhat" enclosure surrounds the marble cenotaph, which is usually covered by a green cloth. A wooden canopy encrusted with mother-of-pearl inlay mosaic stretches over it.

The door to the main chamber is intricately carved with arabesque patterns and bears inscriptions from the Quran. Brown marble borders the interior bays while the relief panels - with the Quran verses - have a blue background. The carved and painted tomb chamber has a white marble floor, which is inlaid with multicolored stones. The multicoloured stones which are also a piece of diamond ruby or emerald.

== Gallery ==
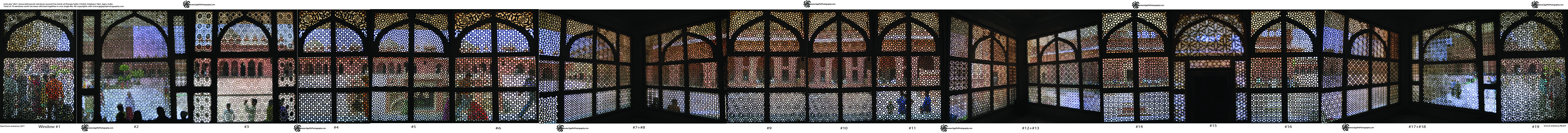
A compilation of all the jalis around the tomb of Salim Chishti

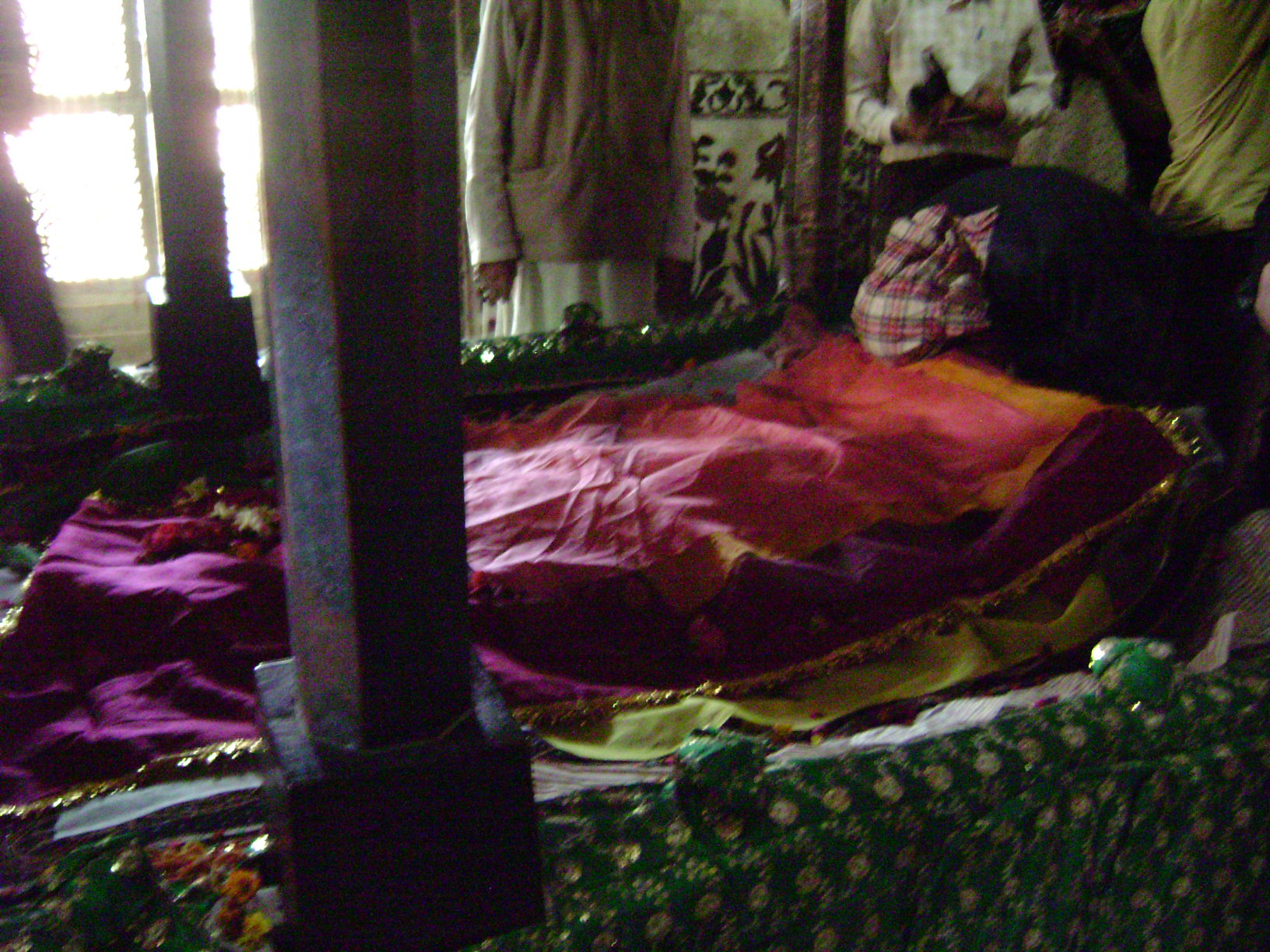
Tomb of Salim Chisti

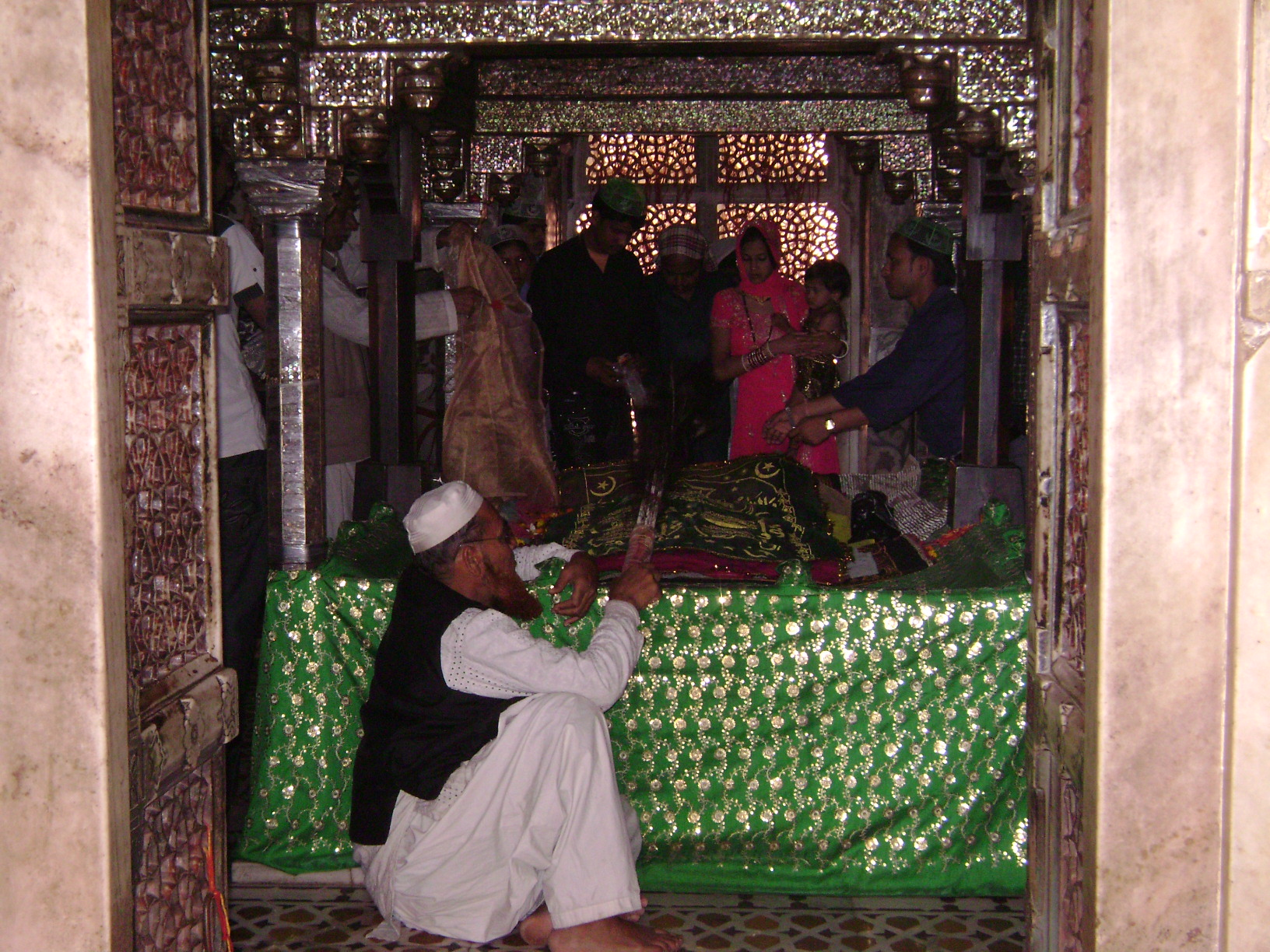
An ulama in front of the tomb

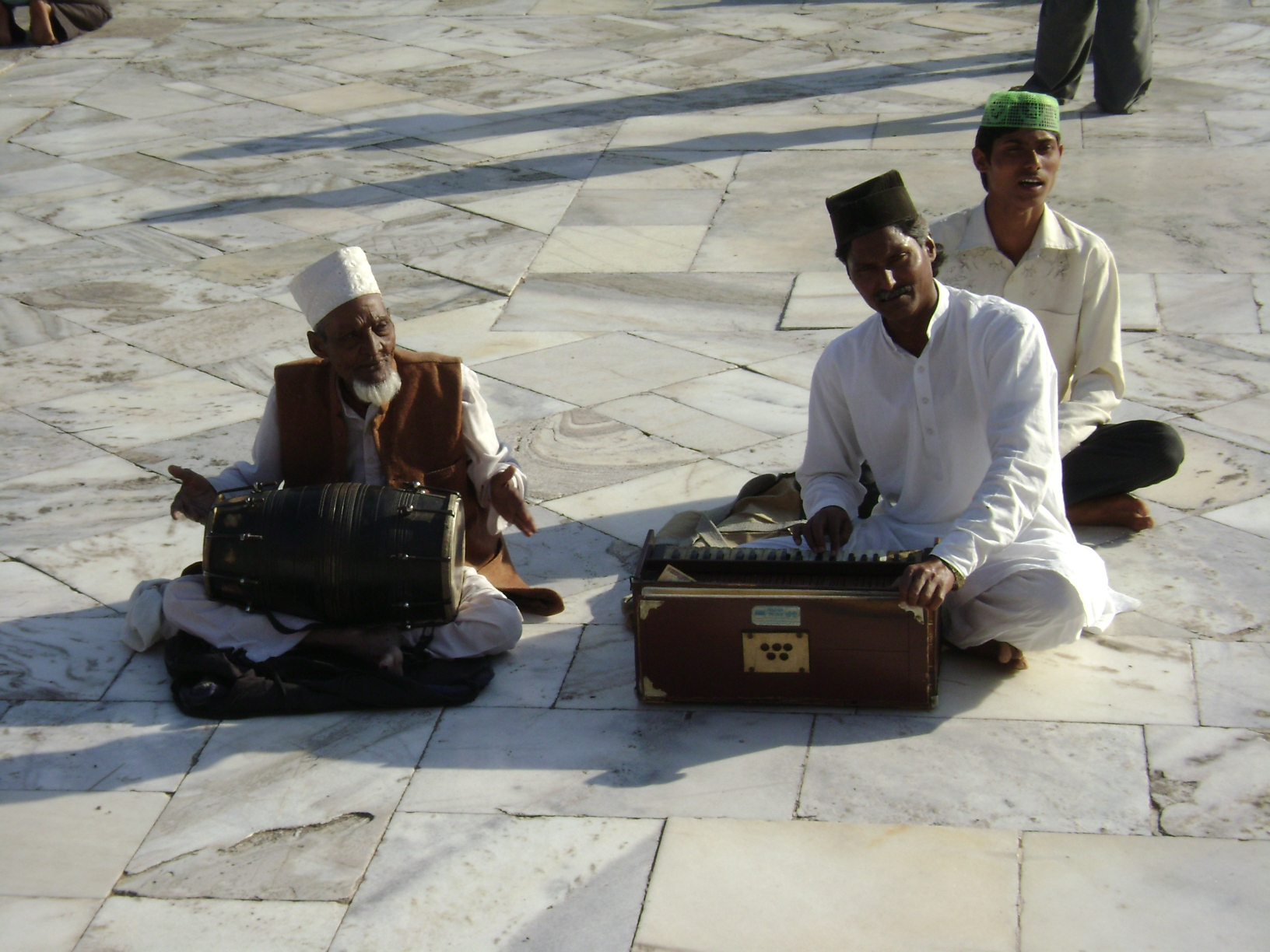
Sufi singers in front of the building

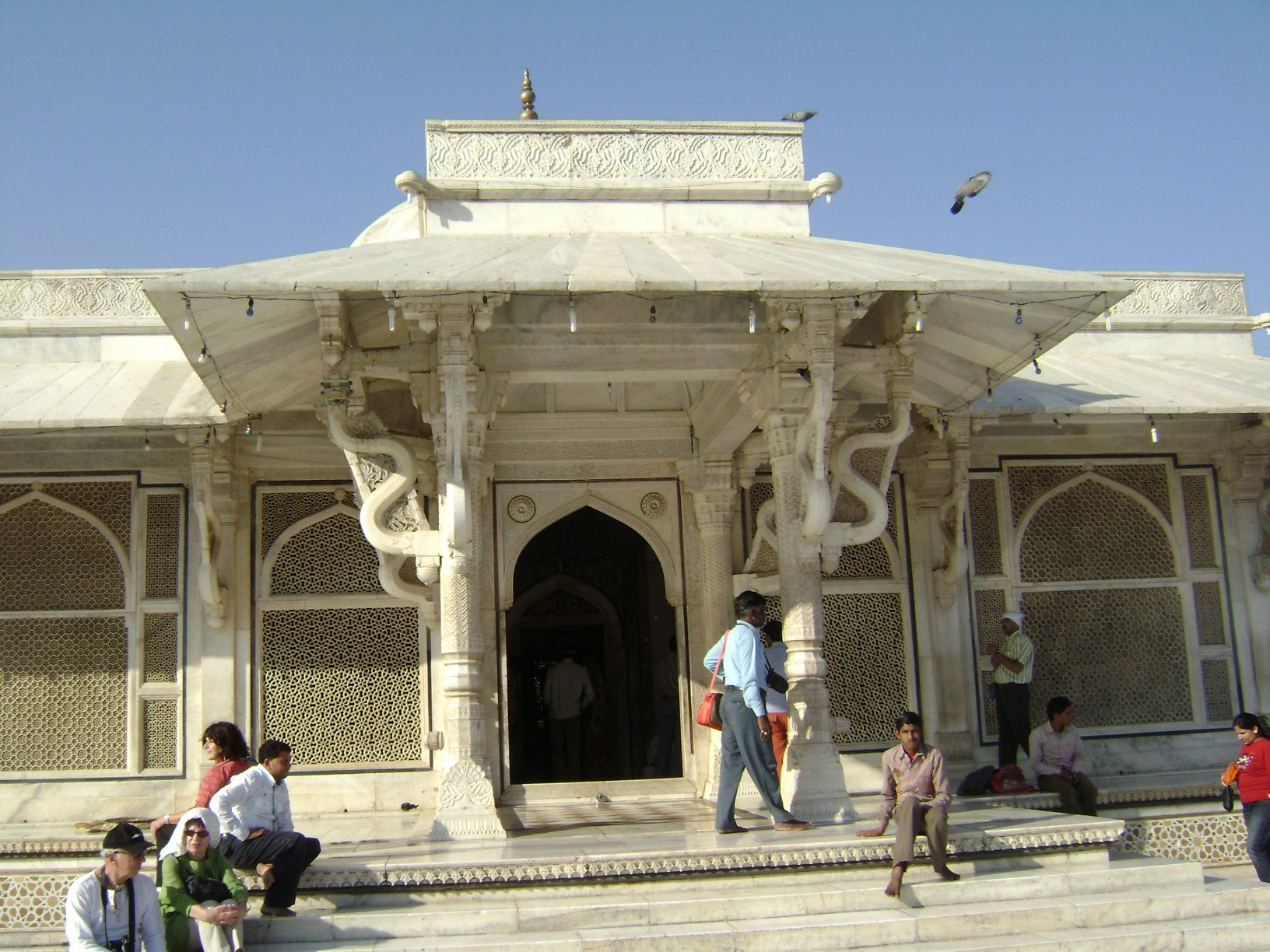
A closer view of the building

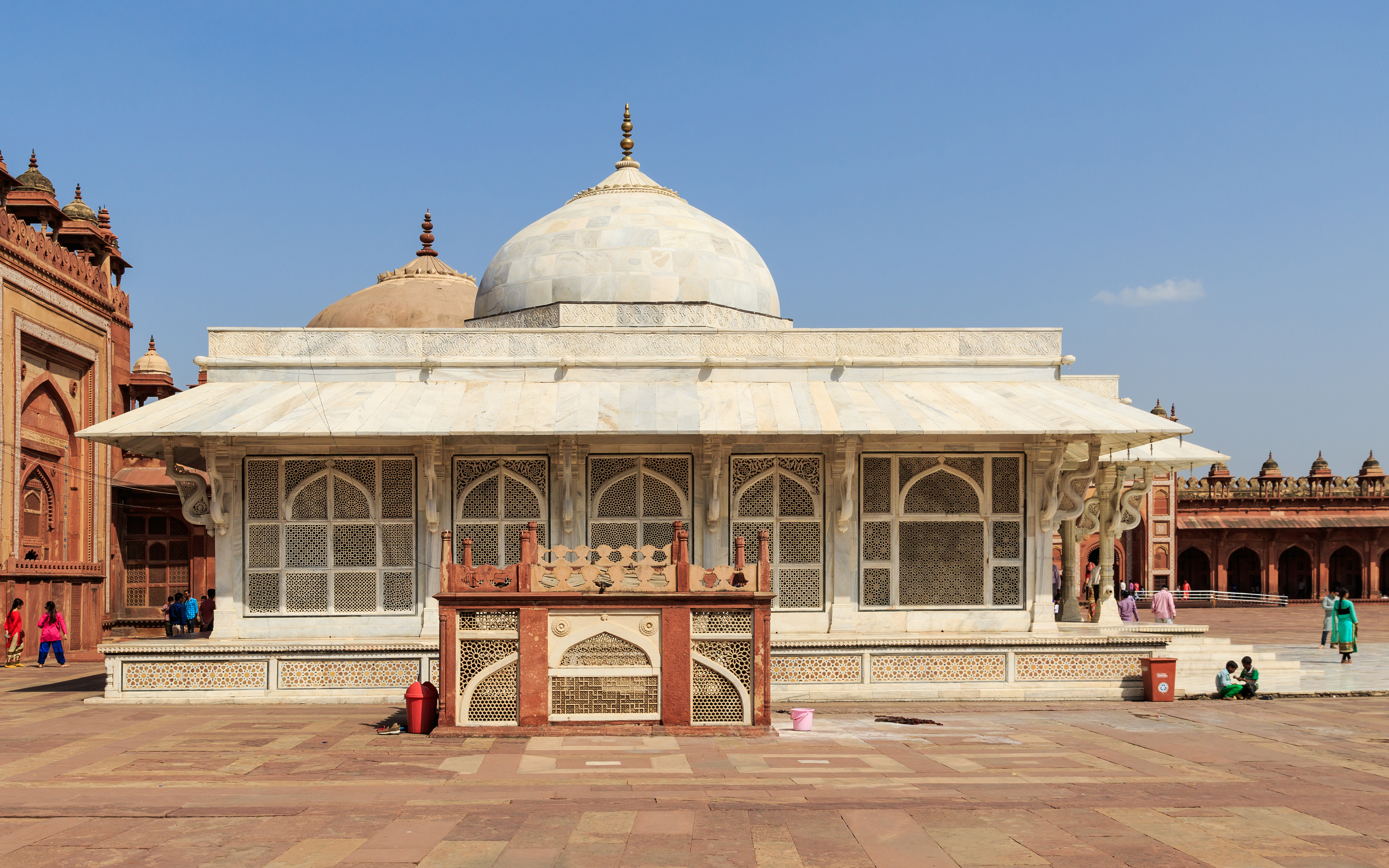
Side view

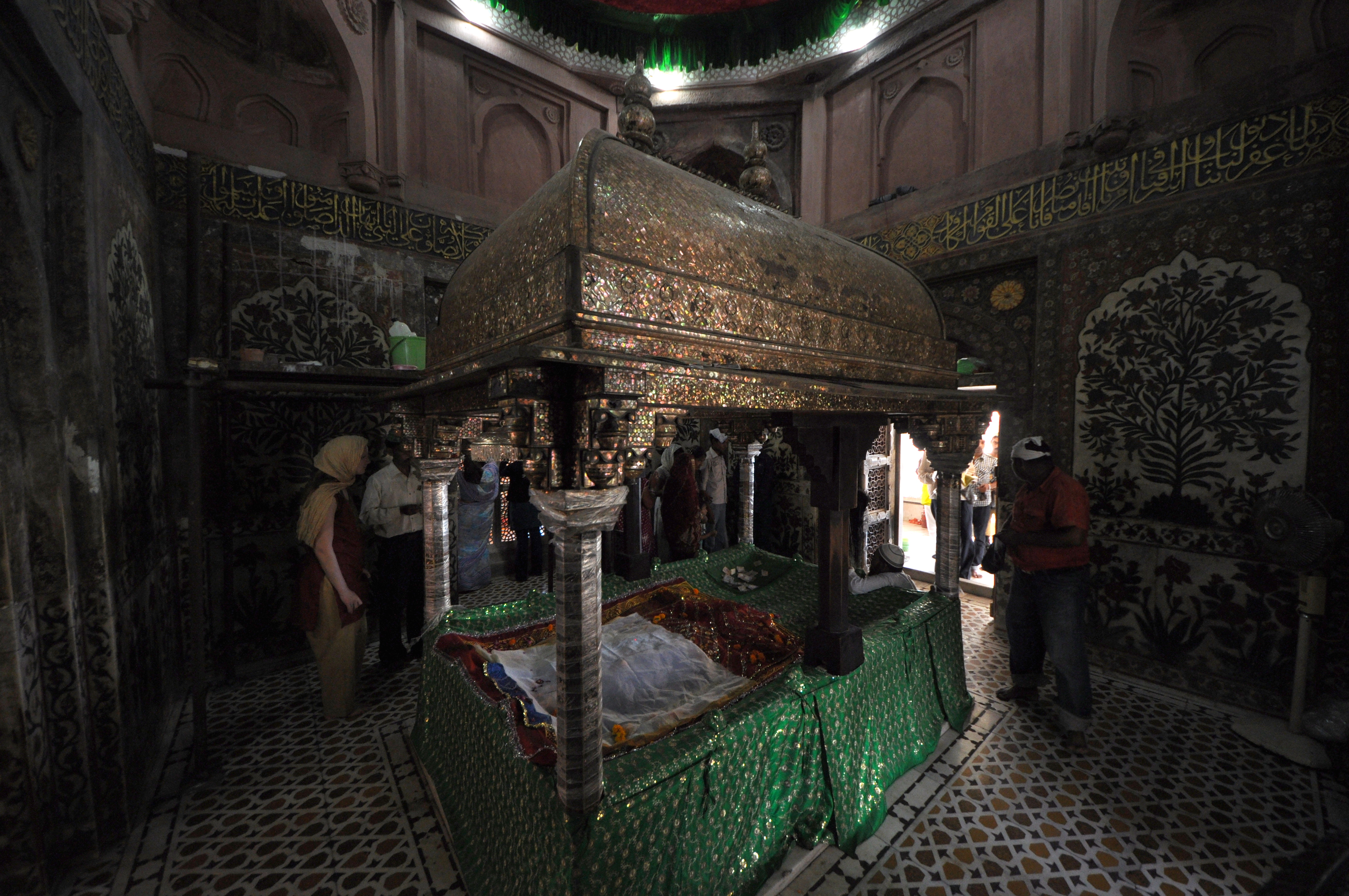
Inside the tomb of Salim Chishti

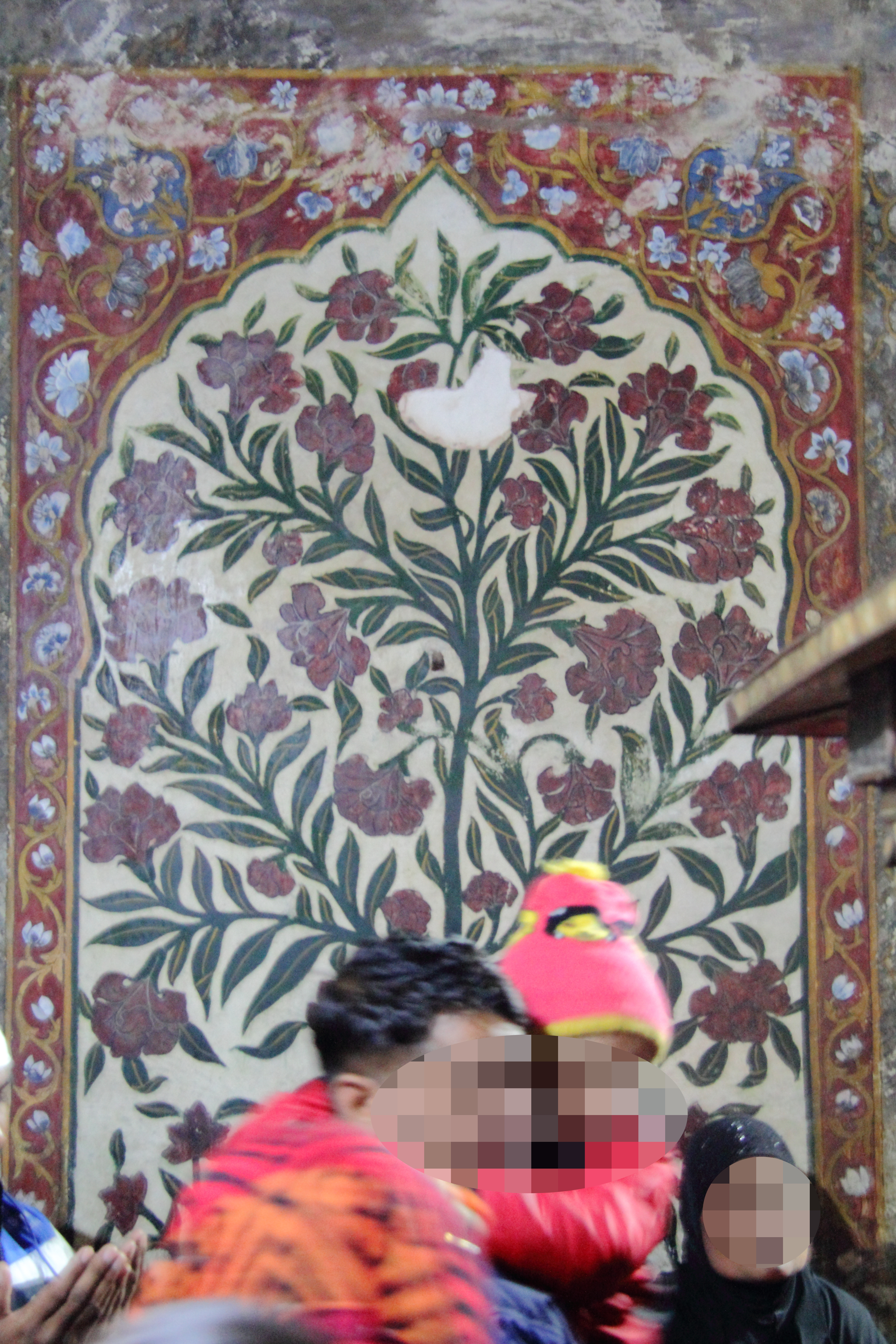
interior of the tomb of Salim Chishti
