= Music of Bengal =

Bengali music (Bengali: বাংলা সংগীত, Bangla Sangeet) comprises a long tradition of religious and secular song-writing over a period of almost a millennium. Composed with lyrics in the Bengali language, Bengali music spans a wide variety of styles.

== History ==
The earliest music in Bengal was influenced by Sanskrit chants, and evolved under the influence of Vaishnav poetry such as the 13th-century Gitagovindam by Jayadeva, whose work continues to be sung in many eastern Hindu temples. The Middle Ages saw a mixture of Hindu and Islamic trends when the musical tradition was formalized under the patronage of Sultan and Nawabs and the powerful landlords Baro Bhuiyans.

The earliest record of Sufism in Bengal goes back to 11th century AD in connection with the continuation of Sufism in northern India. Shah Sultan Rumi was the first Sufi to come to Bengal, when he came to Mymensingh in 1053 AD.Sufism not only helped in the spread of Islam in Bengal, but also contributed to the eventual creation of a Muslim society in Bangladesh. Apart from the religiosity, the influence of the Sufis became attached to popular Bengali culture by the confluence of the murshidi, marfati and baul songs, and gazir gan.

== Forms ==
=== Kotali Gharana ===
Kotalipara in the Faridpur Zilla of East Bengal (presently Bangladesh) owes its origin to "Chandraburmankot" erected there, circa 315 AD, the remains of which are still extant. "Kot" stands for fort, "Ali" signifies "wall and area surrounding the fort", and "para" means a settlement or "a neighbourhood".

KotaliPara had been a hotbed of intellectual excellence for ages, especially in music, art and scholarship.

Sangeetacharya Tarapada Chakraborty (1909–1975), was the first Pan-Indian Khayaliya from Bengal and the pioneer of Kotali Gharana. He had a journey similar to Ustad Allauddin Khan's, coming to Kolkata penniless from Kotalipara ( currently in Bangladesh ) to learn classical music. Kotali Gharana is built on aesthetics. The aesthetics of the raga, expression, lyrics and thoughts. Over the years, the present Kotali style took the shape in the hands of Pandit Manas Chakraborty, a combination of musical purity and eclecticism, the practice of deriving ideas, style, or taste from a broad and diverse range of sources. Vidushi Ruchira Panda, is the global face of Kotali Gharana today.

=== Bishnupur Gharana ===
The Bishnupur Gharana is the sole Classical (Drupad) gharana of Bengal. It originated in Bishnupur, Bankura by the court musicians of the Malla Kings. Bahadur Khan of Delhi, a descendant of the Tansen, was the father of Bishnupur Gharana. Bahadur Khan was brought to Bishnupur by Malla King Raghunath Singha II.

=== Murshidi ===
Murshidi Gan devotional folk songs that evolved and flourished mainly through sufis. The word 'murshid', derives from the Arabic 'ershad', and means 'to order or give advice'. A murshid gives advice to his disciples and leads them to the spiritual way by means of devotional rites.

=== Baul ===
The Bauls (meaning "divinely inspired insanity") are a group of mystic minstrels (Muslim Sufis and Hindu Baishnos) from the Bengal region, who sang primarily in the 17th and 18th centuries. They are thought to have been influenced greatly by the Hindu tantric sect of the Kartabhajas as well as by Muslim Sufi philosophers. Bauls traveled and sang in search of the internal ideal, Moner Manush (Man of the Heart or the inner being), and described "superfluous" differences between religions. Lalon Fakir, alternatively known as Lalon Shah, who lived in the 19th century in and around Kushtia, is considered to be the greatest of all bauls.

=== Ramprasadi ===
The Bengali devotional songs written and music composed by eighteenth century Bengali saint-poet Ramprasad Sen are called Ramprasadi. They are usually addressed to Hindu goddess Kali.

=== Lalon Geeti ===
The Bengali songs composed by Bengali saint, philosopher, and social reformer Lalon are called Lalon Geeti. Lalon was against religious conflict and many of his songs mock identity politics that divide communities and generate violence. He even rejected nationalism at the apex of the anti-colonial nationalist movements in the Indian subcontinent. He did not believe in classes or castes, the fragmented, hierarchical society and took a stand against racism. Lalon does not fit the "mystical" or "spiritual" type who denies all worldly affairs in search of the soul: he embodies the socially transformative role of sub-continental bhakti and sufism. He believed in the power of music to alter the intellectual and emotional state in order to be able to understand and appreciate life itself.

It is estimated that Lalon composed about 2,000–10,000 songs, of which only about 800 songs are generally considered authentic. Lalon left no written copies of his songs, which were transmitted orally and only later transcribed by his followers. Rabindranath Tagore published some of the Lalon song in the monthly Prabasi magazine of Kolkata.

=== Hasan Raja's Songs ===
This songs are composed by legendary Bengali mystic poet, songwriter, and philosopher, Hason Raja, from Sylhet, Bangladesh. His songs focus on spiritual awakening, the transient nature of life, and the search for divinity within oneself. These compositions, often referred to as Baul songs, are filled with mysticism, simplicity, and profound truth. Hasan Raja's works have inspired countless folk singers and spiritual enthusiasts.

=== Rabindra Sangeet ===
The leading proponent of Bengali music is Rabindranath Tagore (known in Bengali as Robi Thakur and Gurudeb, the latter meaning "Respected Teacher" (in the Bengal of that time, the suffix 'deb' was an honorific, ascribed to people who enjoyed immense respect, but this title was primarily used by his students at Santiniketan, though many others did use the address/)). Tagore was a prolific composer with around 2,230 songs to his credit. His songs are known as rabindrasangit ("Tagore Song"), which merges fluidly into his literature, most of which—poems or parts of novels, stories, or plays alike—were lyricised. Influenced by the thumri style of Hindustani music, they ran the entire gamut of human emotion, ranging from his early dirge-like Brahmo devotional hymns to quasi-erotic compositions. They emulated the tonal colour of classical ragas to varying extents. Some songs mimicked a given raga's melody and rhythm faithfully; others newly blended elements of different ragas. Yet about nine-tenths of his work was not bhanga gaan, the body of tunes revamped with "fresh value" from select Western, Hindustani, Bengali folk and other regional flavours "external" to Tagore's own ancestral culture. His music is an exemplary instance of 'kavya-geeti', a style of composition that later found widespread use in the music industries at Bombay and Calcutta.

In 1971, Amar Shonar Bangla became the national anthem of Bangladesh. It was written — ironically — to protest the 1905 Partition of Bengal along communal lines: cutting off the Muslim-majority East Bengal from Hindu-dominated West Bengal was to avert a regional bloodbath. Tagore saw the partition as a cunning plan to stop the independence movement, and he aimed to rekindle Bengali unity and tar communalism. Jana Gana Mana was written in shadhu-bhasha, a Sanskritised form of Bengali, and is the first of five stanzas of the Brahmo hymn Bharot Bhagyo Bidhata that Tagore composed. It was first sung in 1911 at a Calcutta session of the Indian National Congress and was adopted in 1950 by the Constituent Assembly of the Republic of India as its national anthem.

For Bengalis, the songs' appeal, stemming from the combination of emotive strength and beauty described as surpassing even Tagore's poetry, was such that the Modern Review observed that "[t]here is in Bengal no cultured home where Rabindranath's songs are not sung or at least attempted to be sung... Even illiterate villagers sing his songs". Tagore influenced sitar maestro Vilayat Khan and sarodiyas Buddhadev Dasgupta and Amjad Ali Khan.

Most of his musical poems are detailed in two series of books – the Gitabitan (that only has the texts of the poems) and the Swarabitan (that has the poems and their musical notation). However, there exist several poems of his that are set to music, and yet find no mention in either of the above. These are handed down from his students to their students and so on.

Some of the notable exponents of Rabindrasangeet are Shantideb Ghosh, Debabrata Biswas, Pankaj Kumar Mullick, Kalim Sharafi, Kanika Bandyopadhyay, Rajeshwari Datta, Malati Ghoshal, Nilima Sen, Suchitra Mitra, Aditi Mohsin, Rezwana Choudhury Bannya, Subinoy Roy, Chinmoy Chatterjee, Hemanta Mukhopadhyay, Kishore Kumar, Manna Dey, Shyamal Mitra, Dwijen Mukhopadhyay, Sagar Sen, Santosh Thakur, Purabi Mukhopadhyay, Kabir Suman, Banani Ghosh, Mita Haque, Indrani Sen, Srikanto Acharya, Shreya Guhathakurta Sahana Bajpaie Mohan Singh

Furthermore, it is believed that on 27 December 1931, Dhurjatiprasad Mukhopadhyay wrote an essay titled "রবীন্দ্রনাথের সংগীত" (Rabindranath's Music) for Tagore's 70th birth anniversary, in which the term "Rabindrasangeet" was used for the first time. In January 1935, Kanak Das's recording P11792, featuring "মনে রবে কিনা রবে আমারে" ("Whether or not I remain in your recollection") and "কাছে যবে ছিল পাশে হল না যাওয়া" ("When you were near, I couldn't reach you") first used "Rabindrasangeet" on the label.

=== Nazrul Geeti ===
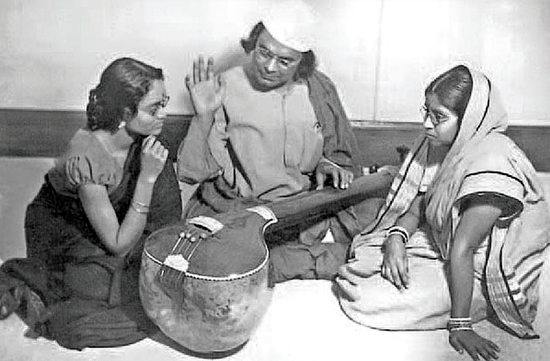
Nazrul teaching Nazrul Sangeet

Nazrul Sangeet (Bengali: নজরুল সঙ্গীত), also Nazrul Geeti (Bengali: নজরুল গীতি; lit. 'music of Nazrul'), refers to the songs written and composed by Kazi Nazrul Islam, the national poet of Bangladesh. Nazrul Geeti incorporate revolutionary notions as well as more spiritual, philosophical and romantic themes. Nazrul wrote and composed nearly 4,000 songs (including gramophone records), which are widely popular in Bangladesh and India. Some of the most notable Nazrul Sangeet include Notuner Gaan, the national marching song of Bangladesh and O Mon Romzaner Oi Rozar Sheshe, a Bengali Islamic song on the festival of the Bengali celebration of Chand Raat and Eid-ul-Fitr.

Some of the notable Nazrul Geeti singers from India include Suprova Sarkar, Dhirendra Chandra Mitra, Manabendra Mukhopadhyay, Dr. Anjali Mukhopadhyay, Dhiren Bose, Adhir Bagchi, Purabi Dutta, Firoza Begum, Anup Ghoshal, and, Bangladeshi singer Sohrab Hossain.

=== Jasimuddin Songs ===
Jasimuddin (1903–1976), also known as the Poet of the Village, was a renowned Bengali poet, songwriter, and folklorist. His works often celebrated rural life, nature, and the simplicity of village Bengal. His songs are deeply rooted in folk traditions and are filled with emotional depth and lyrical beauty. A notable singer is Abbasuddin Ahmed.

=== Shyama Sangeet ===
Shyama Sangeet is a genre of Bengali devotional songs dedicated to the Hindu goddess Shyama or Kali which is a form of supreme universal mother-goddess Durga or Parvati. It is also known as Shaktagiti or Durgastuti. Shyama Sangeet appeals to the common man because it is a musical representation of the relationship of eternal and sublime love and care between the mother and her child. It is free of the common rituals of worship and also the esoteric practice of the Tantra. A notable singer is Pannalal Bhattacharya.

Generally all music dedicated to goddess Mother Kali is called 'Shyama Sangeet' in Bengali. Two famous singers of this Bengali Shyama Sangeet are Pannalal Bhattacharya and Dhananjay Bhattacharya. Pannalal Bhattacharya's elder brother Prafulla Bhattacharya and middle brother Dhananjay Bhattacharya were the first music teachers of saint artist Pannalal Bhattacharya. Dhananjay Bhattacharya stopped singing devotional songs after finding devotional spirit in his brother Pannalal. However, after the demise of Pannalal Bhattacharya, he contributed again in Bengali music with many devotional songs by his sweet, melodious voice.

=== Dwijendrageeti ===
Dwijendralal Ray's Dwijendrageeti (the Songs of Dwijendralal), which number over 500, create a separate subgenre of Bengali music. Two of Dwijendralal Ray's most famous compositions are Dhana Dhanya Pushpa Bhara and Banga Amar Janani Amar. Ray is regarded as one of the most important figures in early modern Bengali literature.

=== Rajjob Geeti ===
Rajjob Ali Dewan was a legendary Bengali folk singer, poet, and lyricist who made significant contributions to Bengali folk music, particularly in the genres of Baul, Bhatiali, and Marfati (Sufi-inspired) songs. His works reflect rural life, spiritual love, and mysticism. Rajjob Ali Dewan's songs are cherished for their philosophical depth and connection to everyday life. Famaous singers of Rajjob getti are Abdul Alim, Momtaz Begum, Arif Dewan.

=== Atulprasadi ===
Atulprasadi, one of the major lyricist and composers of early-modern period, is also widely popular in Paschimbanga. Atul Prasad is credited with introducing the Thumri style in Bengali music. His songs centred on three broad subjects: patriotism, devotion and love.

=== Paramartha Sangeet ===
Paramartha Sangeet is a collection of devotional songs, which were composed and sung by Maharshi Nagendranath Bhaduri, a renowned yogi and spiritual figure.

Nagendranath Bhaduri founded "Sanatana Dharma Pracharini Sabha" in 1891, a society dedicated to spreading the message of Sanatana Dharma. This organization, later known as "Nagendra Math" under the guidance of his disciple Dhyanaprakash Brahmachari, published a compilation of songs called Paramartha Sangitabali. This compilation includes three songs composed by Nagendranath himself, which were reportedly sung in the presence of Ramakrishna.

=== Prabhat Samgiita ===
Prabhát Saḿgiita also known as Songs of a New Dawn and Prabhat Songs, are songs composed by Prabhat Ranjan Sarkar. Sarkar composed a total of 5,018 songs including the lyrics and the tune, in a period of eight years from 1982 until his death in 1990, making using of eight different languages: Bengali, Hindi, English, Sanskrit, Urdu, Magahi, Maithili and Angika.

=== Mujbhandari Songs ===
Mujbhandari Songs are Islamic devotional songs associated with the Mujbhandari Sufi Order, a renowned Sufi tradition originating in Bengal, particularly linked to the shrine of Hazrat Shah Sufi Syed Ahmad Ullah Mujbhandari of Chittagong, Bangladesh. These songs praise Allah, Muhammad, and Sufi saints while promoting spiritual love, peace, and devotion. Famous Mujbhandari Singers are Sufi Samrat Abdul Gafur Hali, Jalal Uddin, Abdul Latit, Shafi Mondol and Arif Dewan.

=== Rajanikanta Sen's Songs ===
Rajanikanta Sen (1865–1910) was a renowned Bengali poet, composer, and lyricist known for his devotional songs, patriotic anthems, and emotional melodies. His songs reflect deep spirituality, patriotism, and love for humanity.

=== Other ===
- Bhatiali
- Qwali
- Bhawaiya
- Polli Geeti
- Lokgeeti
- Fakir Gaan
- Dhamail
- Gombhira
- Kavigan, poems sung with simple music usually presented on stage as a musical battle between poets.
- Jatra Pala, songs associated exclusively with plays (performed on-stage). Usually involves colourful presentations of historical themes.

Numerous other poets and composers had laid the foundation for the rich repertoire of Bengali music in the 19th century and early 20th century. Some stalwarts of this ear include Ramnidhi Gupta (commonly known as Nidhu Babu), Lalon Fakir, Atulprasad Sen, Dwijendralal Ray, Rajanikanta Sen and a large canon of patriotic songs from India's Independence movement.

== Modern Bengali music ==
Modern Bengali and South Asian music has been enriched by singers like Jaganmoy Mitra (1918–2003) (who is considered a pioneer of modern song), Kamal Dasgupta, Firoza Begum, as well as artists such as Hemanta Kumar Mukhopadhyay, Kishore Kumar, Manabendra Mukhopadhyay, Sandhya Mukhopadhyay, Manna Dey, Sachin Dev Burman, Rahul Dev Burman, Bhupen Hazarika, Lata Mangeshkar, Asha Bhonsle, Talat Mehmood, Aarti Mukherji, Kabir Suman, Amit Kumar, Shibaji Chatterjee, Kumar Sanu, Dhananjay Bhattacharya, Shyamal Mitra, Mehuli Thakur, Shreya Ghoshal, Monali Thakur, Arijit Singh, Mitali Mukherjee, Dwijen Mukhopadhyay, Sachin Gupta, Subir Sen, Uma Bose, Kanan Devi, Utpala Sen, Alpana Banerjee, Sabita Chowdhury, and D. L.Roy Dilip Kumar Roy.

Tapan Chowdhury, Azam Khan, Abdul Jabbar, Ferdousi Rahman, Khurshid Alam, Bashir Ahmad, Syed Abdul Hadi, Shahnaz Rahmatullah, Kalim Sharafi, Abida Sultana, Kanak Chapa, Shakila Zafar, Samina Chowdhury, Kumar Biswajit, Arnob, Farida Parveen, Andrew Kishore, James, Ayub Bachchu, Mila, Anusheh Anadil, Sabina Yasmin, and Runa Laila all hailing from Bangladesh.

Krishna Chandra Dey and Pannalal Bhattacharya, were famous for their renditions of devotional songs, while Abbasuddin Ahmed, Kiran Chandra Roy, Amar Pal were stalwarts in singing Bengali folk music.

Bengali music is highly indebted to Lalon, Rabindranath Tagore, Kazi Nazrul Islam, Ramprasad Sen and Jasim Uddin.

All traditional Bengali music is based on classical music or on its variations. Some of the most reputed classical musicians of the sub-continent come from Bengal including Ustad Allauddin Khan, Tarapada Chakraborty, Pandit Jnan Prakash Ghosh (1909–1987), Pandit Ravi Shankar, Pandit Manas Chakraborty, Ustad Ayet Ali Khan and Ustad Abed Hossain Khan.

Notable Bengali music composers active in Calcutta (Kolkata) in the 1930s through the 1980s include Himangshu Dutta, Kamal Dasgupta, Rai Chand Boral, Pankaj Kumar Mullick, Anupam Ghatak, Sachin Dev Burman, Rahul Dev Burman, Nachiketa Ghosh, Hemanta Kumar Mukhopadhyay, Salil Chowdhury, Satyajit Ray, Sudhin Dasgupta, Shyamal Mitra, Kabir Suman, Nachiketa Chakraborty, Ajoy Das, and Bappi Lahiri, while Pranab Roy, Gouri Prasanna Majumdar, Satyajit Ray, Kabir Suman and Pulak Bandyopadhyay were well-known lyricists. Jeet Ganguly is a modern music composer of Bengali film songs and Bollywood songs.

Nachiketa Chakraborty is an Indian Bengali singer, lyricist, and composer whose career spans several decades. He has released over 450 songs, composed more than 300 unreleased works, and influenced subsequent generations of Bengali musicians. Associated with the modern Bengali music movement of the 1990s, Chakraborty was awarded the Banga Bhushan award by the Government of West Bengal.

=== Bengali rock ===
Bengali rock is a music genre in which the song lyrics are written in the Bengali language. It may refer to:

- Rock music of Bangladesh
- Rock music of West Bengal

Western influence has resulted in the emergence of the phenomenon of Bengali bands, both in Dhaka and in Kolkata, as well as songs reflecting the joys and sorrows of the common man, Jibonmukhi Gaan (songs from life), which was inspired by Kabir Suman. Bengali bands became popular with young people in the 1970s, both in India and Bangladesh, and have since become entrenched in modern Bengali culture. Recently, traditional folk-based Bengali songs are also being released by bands.

Rock music of Bangladesh

Bangladeshi rock or Bangla rock originated in Chittagong with roots in 1960s and 1970s rock and roll. Bangladeshi rock music was influenced by the American and British rock and roll music. In the 1960s, blues rock was introduced by Zinga, The Windy Side of Care, The Lightnings, Rambling Stones etc. From early to mid 1970s pop rock music was introduced by Uchcharon, Souls, Feedback and Miles. In the 1980s number of subgenres such as hard rock and heavy metal was introduced. In the 1990s hard rock and heavy metal broke through the mainstream with bands like LRB, Feelings, Ark and Warfaze, Miles, Maqsood O' Dhaka, Souls etc. music of Bangladesh

Rock music of West Bengal

Rock music of West Bengal originated in Kolkata, West Bengal, India. The first rock band in West Bengal was Moheener Ghoraguli and also India's first rock band. In modern times, in this type of music distorted electric guitars, bass guitar, and drums are used, and sometimes accompanied with pianos and keyboards and in early times the instruments used in the modern times were also accompanied by saxophone, flute, violin and bass violin. Bhoomi a Bengali rock band formed in 1999 has also been using flute in their music.

==== Famous bands ====
Bangladesh

Some famous Bangladeshi bands are Nova, Uccharon, Spondan, Souls, Obscure, Different Touch, Feedback, Ark, Miles, LRB, Warfaze, Joler Gaan, Dalchhut, Avash, Shironamhin, Nagar Baul.

India

Bands like Moheener Ghoraguli, Bhoomi, Chandrabindoo, Fossils, Cactus, Lakkhichhara, Krosswindz, Kalpurush, Prithibi, etc.

English bands from Kolkata include Cassini's Division, Bolepur Bluez, Insomnia, Underground Authority, Pseudonym, Chronic Xorn, are also notable. Singers like Ajoy Chakraborty and Kaushiki Chakraborty are working to bring back classical raga influence into Bengali music.

Bengali bands use a wide variety of styles such as rock, pop, folk, and fusion. Their music is influenced both by popular American music as well as traditional Bengali folk music such as Bhatiali, Bhawaiya, Shyama Sangeet and Baul.

== Bangladeshi hip-hop ==
Bangladeshi hip-hop is a genre of music and culture that covers a variety of styles of hip-hop music developed in Bangladesh. Bangladeshi hip-hop is heavily influenced by US hip-hop, and started in the early 2000s.

== Works cited ==
- Tagore, Rabindranath (1997), Dutta, K.; Robinson, A. (eds.), Selected Letters of Rabindranath Tagore, Cambridge University Press, ISBN 978-0-521-59018-1
