= Sadiqur Rahmann =

Bangladeshi musical artist

- সাদিকুর রহমান
- Citizenship: Bangladeshi
- Occupation: Musical artist
- Years active: 2011
- Known for: Bangla songs
- Website: vocalsadi.com

Sadiqur Rahmann is a Bangladeshi musical artist who focuses on Bengali modern and folk music genres. He has received music awards internationally, including New York. He has performed songs both in the country and abroad.
