= Kamalini Mukherji =

Indian vocalist (born 1979)

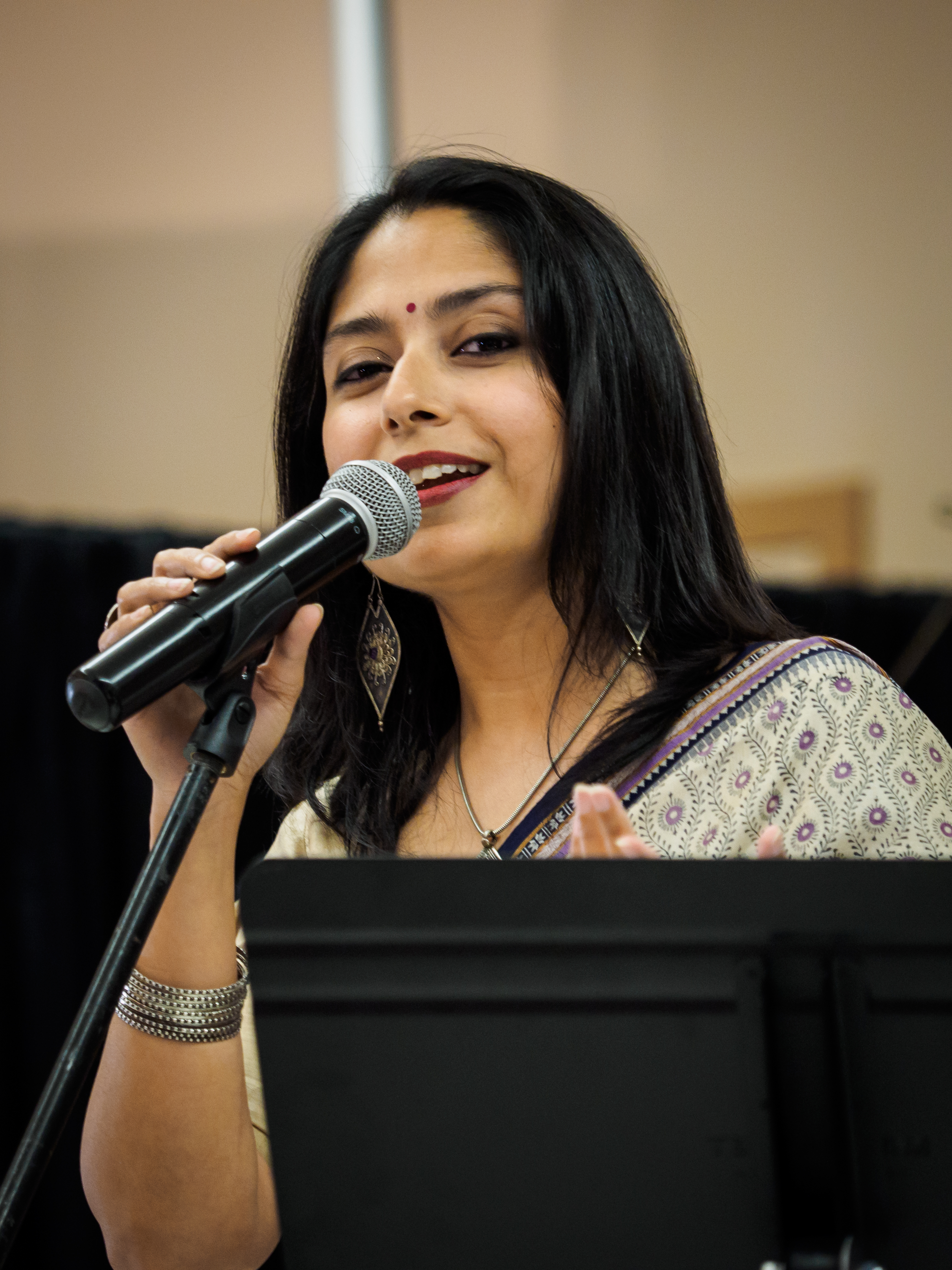
- Born: 17 October 1979 (age 46); Kolkata, India
- Occupation: Rabindra Sangeet Vocalist
- Years active: 2005–present
- Website: kamalinimukherji.com

Kamalini Mukherji (born 17 October 1979) is an Indian vocalist, primarily known for her Rabindra Sangeet performances.

Mukherji has released 12 music albums with Saregama, one of the leading music labels in India. As of 2018, she has performed concerts in India, the US, Canada, and Bangladesh. She has also performed for film and television. Mukherji currently lives in and works out of New York City, USA and Kolkata, India.

== Early life ==
Born into a Bengali family, Mukherji grew up in Kolkata, India where she studied at South Point School. She received her musical training at Dakshinee, a prominent Rabindra Sangeet academy in Kolkata, and obtained a degree in English literature from Jadavpur University, where she also won a Gates Cambridge Scholarship. She pursued post graduate studies in English literature from St. John's College in the UK and Collegio Ghislieri, at the University of Pavia, Italy.

== Career ==
Mukherji performed her debut solo concert in Kolkata in September, 2009. She has since performed extensively in India and abroad, including at the North American Bengali Conferences on three occasions – in 2012 (Las Vegas), 2013 (Toronto), and 2016 (New York City).

Mukherji has attempted to introduce innovation to her Rabindra Sangeet performances. In 2011, she performed a concert titled Nutan Juger Bhore (English:The Dawning of a New Era), accompanied by an 11-piece orchestra, which is unusual for the genre.

In 2012 Mukherji sang for a music album Romancing Tagore, that was a collaborative effort between Indian and Pakistani artists, Shubha Mudgal, Najam Sheraz, Debojyoti Mishra, and Indira Varma to present Tagore's songs in Urdu. Prime Minister Manmohan Singh released the album in February 2012.

In April 2012, Mukherji visited Mauritius as part of a joint initiative between UNESCO and the Ministry of Culture of the Government of Mauritius on the occasion of Rabindranath Tagore's 150th birth anniversary. The purpose of the trip was to introduce the musical work of Tagore to school children in that country.

In 2015, Mukherji presented a solo concert for the President of India, to celebrate the 154th Birth Anniversary of Tagore, at the Rashtrapati Bhavan, New Delhi.

=== Film and television ===
Mukherji was a regular guest on a weekly music show Chirantani (চিরন্তনী), that aired on Tara Muzik from 2008 to 2011. She also hosted her own show Café Thé Live, a live music program and talk show, on the same channel.

She also performed as a playback singer for the 2005 movie Nishijapon (নিশিযাপন), directed by Sandip Ray.

== Discography ==
Mukherji's first individual Rabindra Sangeet music album, Eshechho Prem (এসেছ প্রেম) was released by Saregama in 2010, which was followed by 7 more albums with the same label. In 2016 Saregama released a compilation album Best of Kamalini Mukherjee.

== Reviews ==
Mukherji has been critically appreciated both for her rendition of traditional Rabindra Sangeet as well as for her more interpretative work in the genre.

Reviewing one of her earliest concerts, organized by Dakshinee in May 2006, The Telegraph wrote:

Recital of the day came from Kamalini Mukhopadhyay. Here is one young soprano who has lived up to the great expectations of early years. Her Ki ragini bajale (কী রাগিণী বাজালে) came at the end of the Prem segment. Soaked in the ambiguous melancholy of Kanada, she embellished the number with undulating glides alternating with brisk melodic phrases.

In September 2007, The Telegraph praised her performance at another Dakshinee concert, writing "Yet a musical and humane understanding of the whole life and shape of a song came unmistakably through in the controlled devastation of Kamalini Mukherjee’s Tori amar hothat dubey jai (তরী আমার হঠাৎ ডুবে যায়)". Mukherji's 2009 debut solo concert was also positively reviewed. The Telegraph wrote:

[T]he most remarkable element of her gayaki is the precise and powerful scansion — never an inadvertent splitting of a word, or a breather in the wrong place —- that puts her in the tiny club of cerebral Rabindrasangeet singers.

Reviewing the same concert, The Statesman wrote "Kamalini Mukherji holds in her singing a promise to succeed in popularizing Rabindranath Tagore's song among the present generation", while Anandabazar Patrika praised her arrangement of Tagore's Devotional Songs and Love Songs, and the way that she was able to draw out diverse moods such as happiness, wonderment, separation, and earnestness. In November 2010, The Telegraph reviewed her experimental concert Nutan juger bhore (নূতন যুগের ভোরে),

Thanks to Mukherji’s powerful singing that never allowed a note to waver or an emotional resonance to overstep its suggestion, the music remained as embellishment and never took an iota away from her performance.

However, The Statesman was critical of the "excess of external support", and commented:

[T]he passion that went into her singing may have raised questions on whether there was any need to think about external aids to support the musical tastes of the band era.
