= Dakshini =

Daks(h)ini or Daxini (lit. 'southern') may refer to:

- Dakṣiṇī, a southern variety of Classical Sanskrit
- Daxini, a neighbourhood in Ahmedabad, India
- Dakshinee, a music academy in Kolkata, India
- Manali Dakshini (born 1997), Indian cricketer

== See also ==
- Dakṣiṇa (disambiguation)
  - Dakṣiṇā, Sanskrit term for honorarium
- Dakhini, an Indo-Aryan language of South India related to Urdu
