= Pal Choudhury High School =

Ranaghat Pal Choudhury High School
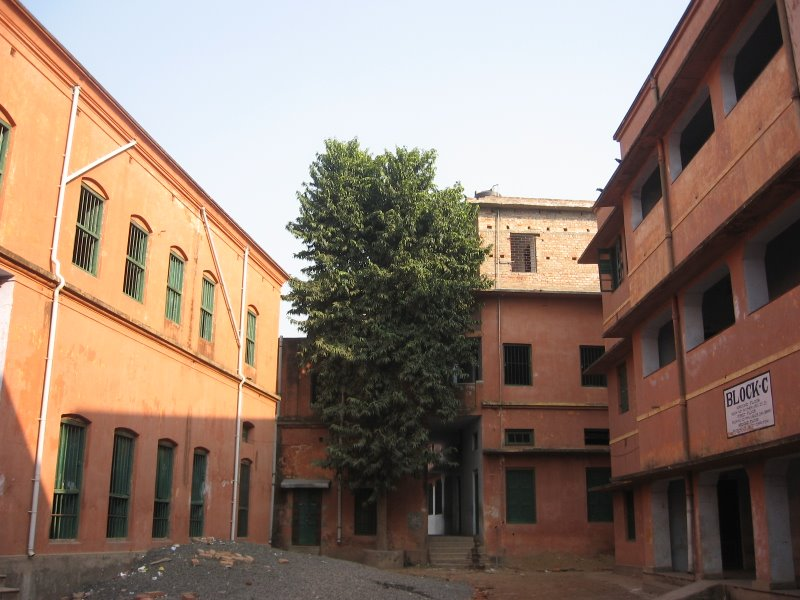
- Pal Choudhury High School

Location
- School Lane; Ranaghat, West Bengal, 741201; India; 23.1786263°N 88.5618181°E

Information
- Established: 1853; 173 years ago

Ranaghat Pal Choudhury High School is a school in West Bengal, India, in Ranaghat, Nadia District. It was established in 1853 by the Pal Choudhury family of Gatak Para, before Sepoy Mutiny.

It is located on the bank of the Churni River, two km from the Ranaghat railway station along the Netaji Subhash Avenue.

== Education system ==
This school has education provision from class I to class XII. The medium of instruction is Bengali. The syllabus of the West Bengal Board is followed in primary secondary and high-secondary (Plus Two) system. Before the final board exam, two internal exams (known as Pre-Test and Test) are conducted by the school authority to see the status of the outgoing students.

== Gallery ==
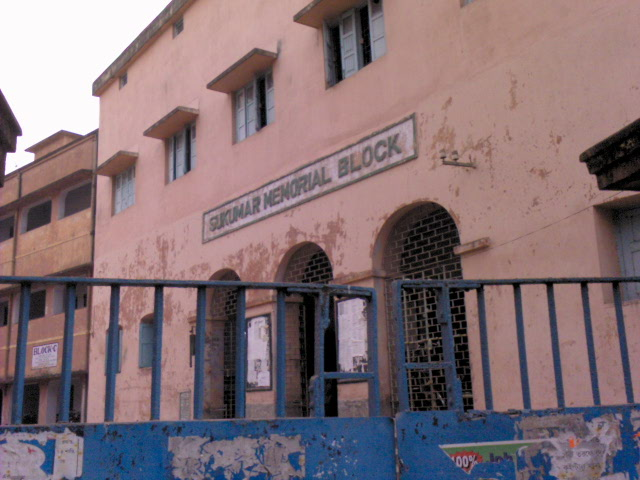
Sukumar Memorial, front gate

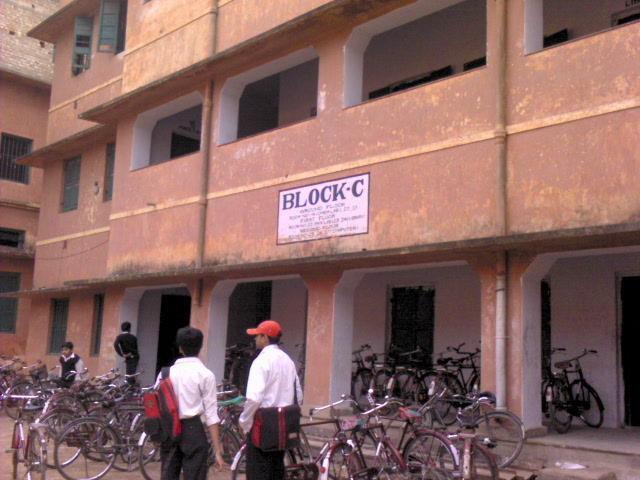
Block C

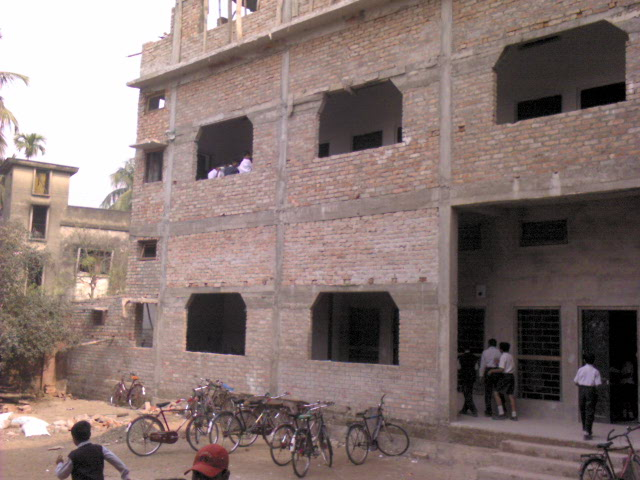
New building under construction

== Notable people ==
- Prabhat Kumar Mukhopadhyaya, a Bengali author best known for his biography of Rabindranath Tagore
- Bholanath Bandyopadhyay, poet of the elegiac poem 'Ashru'.

== See also ==
- Ranaghat
- Education in India
- List of schools in India
- Education in West Bengal
