= Lal Paharir Deshe Ja =

Bengali-language song

Lal Paharir Deshe Ja (transl. You belong to the land of red hills) is a Bengali folk music based on a poem written by Arun Chakraborty in 1970s.

Arun Chakraborty, a folk artist (and engineer by training), wrote the poem after spotting a leafless Palash tree at Srirampur Station, he considered the tree to be misfit and thought that it should belong to the red hills. He went home and wrote down his thoughts. He used a tribal dialect while penning the poem.
