= Sitanath Tattwabhushan =

Pandit Sitanath Tattwabhushan was the official theologian and philosopher of the Sadharan Brahmo Samaj. His hymns still form the basis of Brahmo rites and liturgies.

== Early life ==
He was born Sitanath Dutta, in a village in Sylhet in 1856. He arrived in Calcutta for higher education in 1871. Although he initially joined Keshub Chunder Sen's Brahmo Niketan where he developed an interest in the philosophy of religion. However following the closure of that institute, he joined Alexander Duff's General Assembly's Institution in 1875. In 1879, he joined Anandamohan Bose's City School as a teacher. Late in 1883, he joined the Sadharan Brahmo Samaj's institute of theology as its secretary, and was associated with its activities for twelve years. During this period he explored comparative discourses on Brahmo theology and religion.

He was elected president of the Sadharan Brahmo Samaj in 1926.

== Religious positions ==
Following his extensive readings, and intellectual exchanges with his peers, he developed the view that the failure of Brahmoism to draw converts lay in its being less philosophic, and being more grounded on dogma, based on divine inspiration and unverifiable assertions. To counter this, he put forward the need for developing a faith based on philosophy. In his written works, he developed a theological system of Brahmoism. This was based not on natural intuition or spontaneity, but on the metaphysics of theism and self-knowledge, based on the Upanishads and the Vedanta. By emphasising the primacy of ethical development as instrumental to the formation of consciousness, his thoughts presaged those of Vivekananda.

== Controversies ==
He attacked Vaishnava religion as he felt that natural or spontaneous religion based on the traditions of Bhakti did not help in the development of critical rational faculties, and paradoxically served to keep the masses illiterate, and uncritical.

His critical appraisal of Brahmo followers (primarily the followers of Keshub Chunder Sen's New Dispensation) as spiritual deviants, and his emphasis on logical empiricism earned him detractors both with the Brahmo Samaj (particularly the followers of Keshub Chunder Sen), and in the wider Hindu society, who criticised his efforts as effete scholasticism.

== Family ==
Prabhat Kumar Mukhopadhyaya, best known as the biographer of Rabindranath Tagore, had married his daughter Sudhamoyee. She was one of the earlier period students of Santiniketan. She was founder of the Bolpur Balika Vidyalaya and was its headmistress for many years.

Subinoy Roy, an exponent of Rabindra Sangeet, was the son of his youngest daughter Sukhamoyee Devi.

== Works ==
- Brahmo Jijnasa (Inquiry into the Philosophical Basis of Theism), 1888.
- Philosophy of Brahmoism, 1909.
- Manual of Brahmic Prayer and Devotions, 1921.
