= Dakṣiṇa =

Dakṣiṇa (दक्षिण), Sanskrit for "right-hand side/south", may refer to:

- Dakṣiṇā, the recompense paid to a priest for a sacrifice
- Dakshina, literally "south", a Tantric concept right-hand path
- Deccan Plateau (via Prakrit dakkhin), a plateau in southern India
- South India

== See also ==
- Dakshini (disambiguation)
- Thaksin (disambiguation)
