= Ruchira Panda =

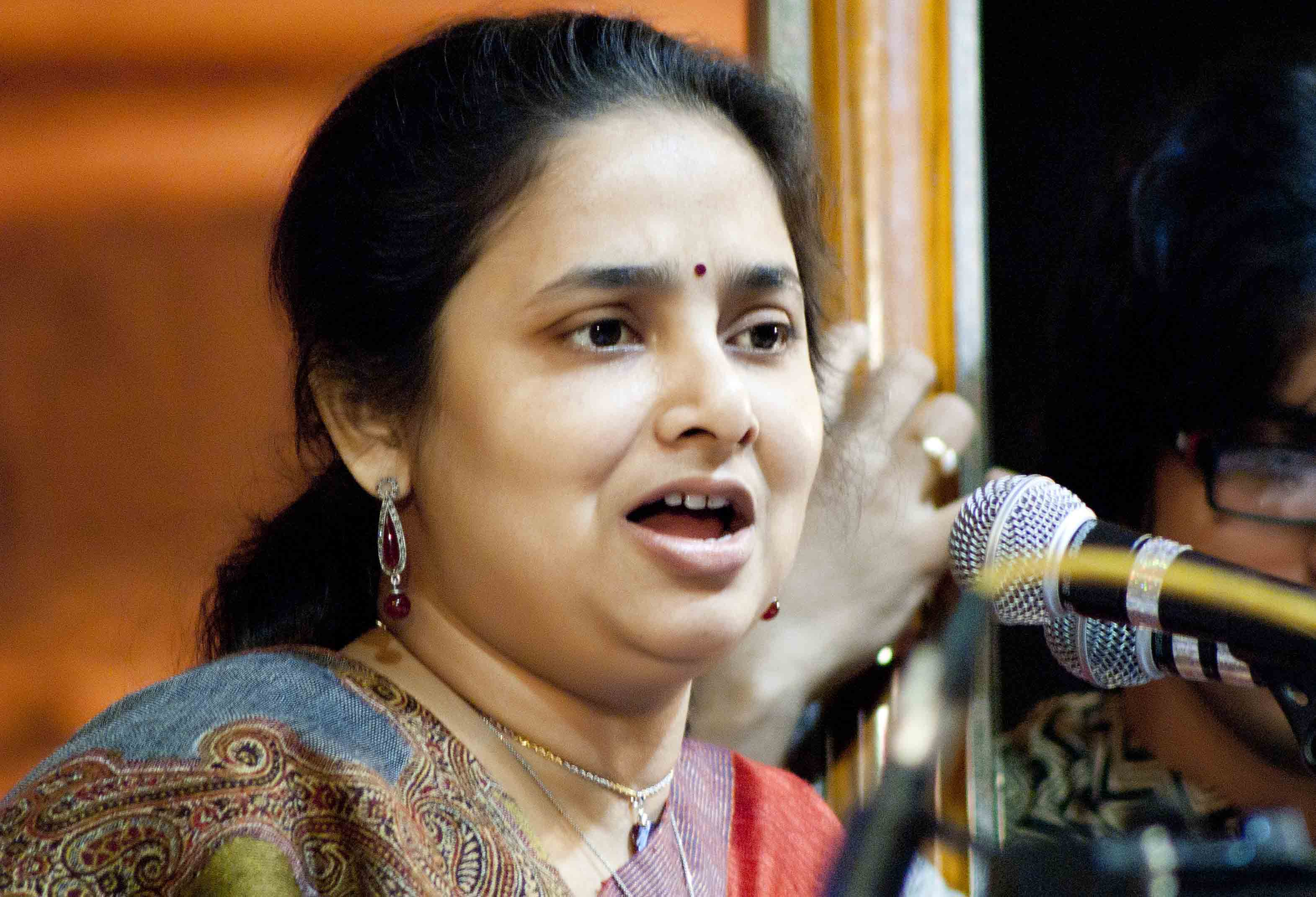

Background information
- Born: 21 October 1975; Deoghar, Jharkhand
- Origin: Kolkata, West Bengal
- Genres: Indian classical music, Khayal, Tappa, Thumri, Bhajan
- Occupations: Musician, Composer, Philanthropist
- Years active: 1994–present
- Website: ruchirapanda.com

Ruchira Panda (Bengali: রুচিরা পাণ্ডা; born 21 October 1975) is a North Indian classical vocalist and disciple of Pandit Manas Chakraborty. She is the current torch bearer of the Kotali Gharana.

She is an exponent of Khayal, Thumri, Tappa, Tap-Khayal, Nirguni Bhajan and other semi classical forms including Jhoola, Birha, Chaiti, Kajri, Patjhar, Jaad ke Geet, Pasar ke Geet etc. She is a solo vocalist and composer who performs across all the major Indian Classical festivals in India, USA, CANADA and Europe.

Panda is an Established Empaneled Artist of Indian Council for Cultural Relations (ICCR), SPIC MACAY, Fellow of The Ministry of Culture, Govt. of India and an "A" grade artist of All India Radio.

== Education ==
Panda attended the Holy Child School for Girls in Calcutta. She graduated from Lady Brabourne College and did her master's degree in Economics from Jadavpur University.

== Works ==
Panda is the founder of a non-profit society Paramparik - The Tradition that operates in education, health and art and culture sectors. She shares interest in poetry and painting.

== Awards ==
Panda won two categories in the Talent Search Contest organised by Dover Lane Music Conference/Academy in the year 1998-99 and received the Ustad Amir Khan Award for best vocalist, His Master's Voice award for best young talent of the year 1998-99 and Rotu Sen Memorial Award for Thumri. The Department of Culture, Ministry of Human Resource Development, Government of India awarded her a scholarship in the field of Hindustani Music in the year 1998–99. She received a Sangeet Kalaratna Award from Matri Udbodhan Ashram, Patna. The Ministry of Culture of the Government of India awarded her a Junior Fellowship in the field of Hindustani Music for the year 2008 - 2009. She received a "Jadubhatta Award" from Salt Lake Cultural Association in the year 2009 - 2010 and "Sangeet Samman" from the same association on the occasion of its Silver Jubilee Celebration (2011 - 2012).
