= Thaksin (disambiguation) =

Thaksin Shinawatra (born 1949) is a former Prime Minister of Thailand.

Thaksin, Thai for "south", may also refer to:

- Thaksin Express, an express train which runs to southern Thailand
- Thaksin University, a public university in Thailand

== See also ==
- Taksin (1734–1782), king of Siam
- Thakins, a Burmese nationalist group
- Dakṣiṇa (disambiguation)
