= Sagar Sen =

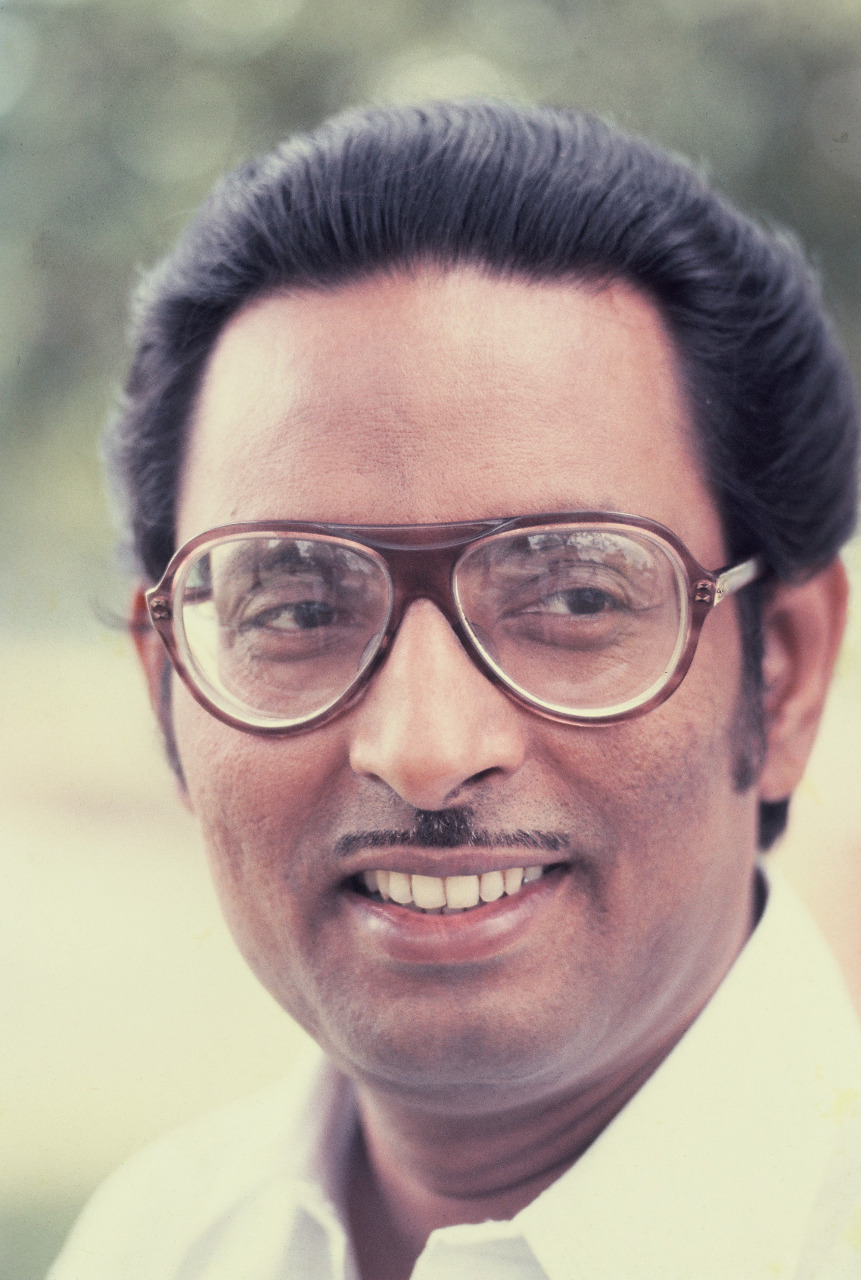
- Portrait photo of Sagar Sen

Background information
- Born: Sagar Sen; 15 May 1932; Faridpur, Bengal Presidency, British India
- Died: 4 January 1983 (aged 50) Calcutta, West Bengal, India
- Genres: Rabindrasangeet, Bengali Modern Songs and Playback
- Occupation: Singer/Organizer
- Years active: 1958–1983
- Labels: His Master's Voice, EMI, Columbia Records
- Website: www.sagarsen.org

Sagar Sen (15 May 1932 – 4 January 1983) was a Bengali singer. Though primarily known as a Rabindrasangeet artist, he recorded numerous Bengali modern songs.

== Career ==
Born 15 May 1932 in a zamindar family of Rajbari, Faridpur district in erstwhile East Bengal, Sagar Sen was the youngest son of Bijon Behari Sen and Noyonmanjari Sen. Though his early childhood was spent in what is now Bangladesh, his entire musical career spanning more than 2½ decades mostly based out of Kolkata, West Bengal, India.

In his early days, Sagar Sen impressed audiences through his local performances and built up a strong following. His songs were first broadcast on All India Radio (AIR) Akashvani, Kolkata in 1958. Sen recorded his first album in 1961 under the Megaphone Records label, featuring the songs Nupuro Bejey Jaye and Ogo Joler Rani.

In 1962, Sen founded the Rabi Rashmi, a Tagorean music academy. The project registered student enrolment in the thousands. His singles Apnake Ei Jana Amar and Keno Aamaye Pagol Kore Jaas were released in 1964 on the Columbia record label, followed by Oei Malatilata Doley and Aamaar Nayano Tabo Nayaner. He participated in the recording of Tagore's operas, Shap Mochan (1966) and Valmiki Pratibha (1967).

1968 saw the release of his single Ami Jene Shune Bish Korechhi Paan, a song from Tagore’s first operatic ballad Mayar Khela, under the EMI record label.

His first stereophonic Long Play (LP) record comprising 12 Tagore songs, 6 each from 'Puja' (Devotional) and 'Prem' (Love) category was released in the year 1974 under the His Master's Voice record label. Through the decades, Sen's numerous Rabindrasangeet renditions that were regularly broadcast live by the AIR and Akashvani, now find place in their archival collections. His solo recitals were broadcast live during the inaugural broadcasts of the Kolkata Doordarshan in August 1975, the first live television broadcast in Bengali; he featured in several subsequent broadcasts of the Doordarshan. Throughout the 1970s and early 1980s he recorded numerous songs with the Gramophone Company of India Ltd.

In 1979, the BFJA, a premier cinematic award was conferred upon him for best playback singing of the Tagore song Aaj Jyotsnaratey Shobai Gechhey Boney in the film Parichay; it was the first time that anyone had won a Bengal film award by singing Rabindrasangeet in a film playback track.

Sagar Sen recorded over a hundred soundtracks with Megaphone, Columbia, and His Master's Voice across two and a half decades. He organized thematic stage shows and concerts based solely on Tagore's music. Among these shows were Shrabon Sandhya (Monsoon Evening), Bishwajana Mohichhey (World Spellbound in Music), Gaaner Jharnatalaye (Under the Cascade of Songs), Swadeshi Naye Bideshi Kheya (Tagore songs from Western Tunes), and Rituranga (Season's Varieties). These concerts were held at venues in Kolkata such as Rabindra Sadan, Sisir Mancha, and Kala Mandir, providing a platform for contemporary Tagorean artists and danseuses. Students from Rabi Rashmi performed choral songs, while contemporaries such as Hemanta Mukhopadhyay, Debabrata Biswas, Suchitra Mitra, and Kanika Bandyopadhyay performed solos.

Sen was also a music mentor, organiser, music director, and a humanist. Through numerous charitable public performances, Sagar Sen contributed to social causes, especially to the West Bengal Chief Minister’s relief fund that was instated to provide relief to the millions affected by the havoc of floods in Bengal during the 1970s.

In the later years of his career, Sagar Sen started recording numerous Bengali modern songs, under the musical direction of composers Hemanta Mukherjee & Salil Chowdhury. The AIR archives have recordings of a number of Bengali modern songs sung by him. He performed as a playback artist notably in Bengali movies Je Jekhane Dariye (1974), Mantramugdha and Abirbhab (1979) amongst others. Sagar Sen directed the music for the Bengali movie Abirbhab; Hemanta Mukherjee & Bhupen Hazarika have sung under his direction. His renditions Ei Jibon Emni Kore Ar To Soy Na and Ki Holo Chand Keno Meghe Dheke Gelo, modern Bengali song tracks composed by Salil Chowdhury and recorded in 1980, were hits.

== Modern songs and playback ==
Sagar Sen performed as a playback artist in the Bengali movies Je Jekhane Dnariye (1974), and Parichay (1979) and Mantramugdha, amongst others. He also directed the music for movies like Abirbhab. in which he was also one of the playback artists. He received a BFJA Award in 1979 for the song 'Aj Jyotsnaratey Sobai Gechhe Boney' in the movie Parichay. He also sang modern Bengali songs like 'Ei Jibon Emni Kore Ar To Soy Na' and 'Ki Holo Chand Keno Meghe Dheke Gelo' in 1980 and a duet with Sabita Chowdhury 'Trishito Nayane Eso' all composed by the maestro composer, Salil Chowdhury.

== Personal life and death ==
In 1962, he married Sumita Sen. Pritam, his first son was born in 1964. His second son Priyam was born in 1966 and his youngest son Promit was born in 1968.

In 1981, he was diagnosed with cancer. Despite this diagnosis, he continued recording and performing for the remainder of his life. He died on 4 January 1983, at the age of 50.

He was survived by his wife and three sons, Pritam Sen, Priyam Sen and Promit Sen.

Promit Sen is a Rabindrasangeet artist in his own right and continues to perform in the present era.
