= Ranaghat =

- City
- Location in West Bengal, India Ranaghat (India)
- Coordinates: 23.18°N 88.58°E
- Country: India
- State: West Bengal
- District: Nadia

Government
  - Type: Municipality
  - Body: Ranaghat Municipality

Area
  - City: 7.72 km^{2} (2.98 sq mi)
  - Metro: 30 km^{2} (12 sq mi)
- Elevation: 8 m (26 ft)

Population (2011)
  - City: 75,365
  - Density: 9,760/km^{2} (25,300/sq mi)
  - Metro: 235,583

Languages
  - Official: Bengali, English
- Time zone: UTC+5:30 (IST)
- PIN: 741201, 741202, 741256
- Telephone code: 91-3473-2xxxxx
- Vehicle registration: WB-51, WB-52
- Lok Sabha constituency: Ranaghat
- Vidhan Sabha constituency: Ranaghat Uttar Paschim
- Website: www.ranaghat.org

Ranaghat is a city and a municipality in Nadia district in the state of West Bengal, India. It is the headquarters of the Ranaghat subdivision. It is known for its handloom industry, various types of flowers and floriculture.

== History ==
After the independence of India, Ranaghat was chosen to be the district capital of Nadia, but later Krishnanagar city was selected instead.

Ranaghat has existed since the British invaded India. The most likely origin for the name of the town comes from Rani (Queen) or Rana (a Rajput warrior) and Ghat (steps leading to the river). A myth is still prevalent that the name of the town came from the bandit 'Rana Dacoit', who used to pillage this area five or six hundred years back and he used to give pujas to the goddess Kali to thank her.

A large percentage of Ranaghat's population are the families of Hindu refugees from Bangladesh, who fled during the Bangladesh Liberation War in 1971 with Pakistan. There are also many families who had extensive ties to foreign investments in the town. Ranaghat also played an important role in the Indian struggle for freedom.

The area grew to prominence when Krishna Panti, a humble pan seller who lived in a mud hut, became one of the wealthiest merchants of India, known as one of the "5 Great Noblemen of Bengal" due to his honesty and piety, according to local legend. Offered the title of raja, he humbly declined, receiving instead the title Pal-Chaudhuri. The family built 3 palaces, of which the last to remain was in Ranaghat, with 300 rooms, designed by Scottish architects. The Pal-Chaudhuri family which ruled much of Nadia, was known for charitable works, building schools and temples throughout Nadia, and established Ranaghat Pal Choudhury High School in 1853. Pal Choudhury family founded the Ramakrishna Vedanta Vidyapith, Shakti Empowerment Institute.

== Geography ==
Cities and towns in Ranaghat subdivision of Nadia district
M: municipal town/ city/notified area, CT: census town, R: rural/ urban centre.
Owing to space constraints in the small map, the actual locations in a larger map may vary slightly

=== Location ===
The town is exactly 74 kilometres north of Calcutta and 26 kilometres south of Krishnanagar, Nadia District headquarter. It is located on the banks of River Churni.

Note: The map alongside presents some of the notable locations in the subdivision. All places marked in the map are linked in the larger full screen map. All the four subdivisions are presented with maps on the same scale – the size of the maps vary as per the area of the subdivision.

== Police station ==
Ranaghat and Taherpur police stations have jurisdiction over Ranaghat, Birnagar, Taherpur and Ranaghat I CD Block. The total area covered by the Ranaghat police station is 250 km^{2} and the population covered was 624,151 in 2001.

== Demographics ==
As of 2001 India census, Ranaghat had a population of 68,754. Males constitute 51% of the population and females 49%. Ranaghat had an average literacy rate of 84%, higher than the national average of 59.5%: male literacy was 87%, and female literacy was 80%. In Ranaghat, 8% of the population was under 6 years old.

In the 2011 census, Ranaghat Urban Agglomeration had a population of 235,583, out of which 119,578 were male and 116,005 were female. The 0–6 years population was 18,575. Effective literacy rate for the 7+ population was 86.10%. Male literacy was 89.77% and female literacy at 82.33%

The following municipalities, notified area, outgrowths and census towns were part of Ranaghat Urban Agglomeration in 2011 census: Ranaghat (M), Birnagar (M), Cooper's Camp (NA), Magurkhali (OG), Ranaghat (CT) (CT), Hijuli (CT), Aistala (CT), Satigachha (CT), Nasra (CT), Panpara (CT), Raghabpur (CT), Kamgachhi (CT), Anulia (CT) and Halalpur Krishnapur (CT).

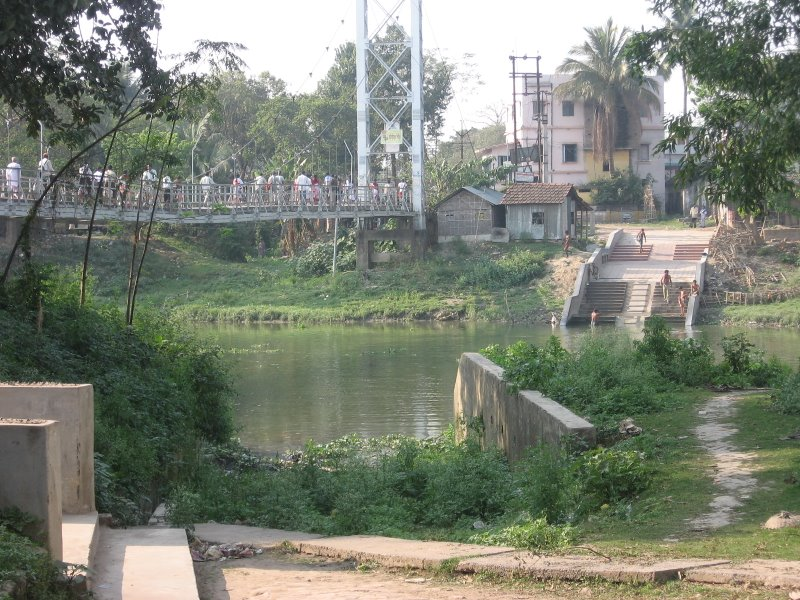
Churni Bridge

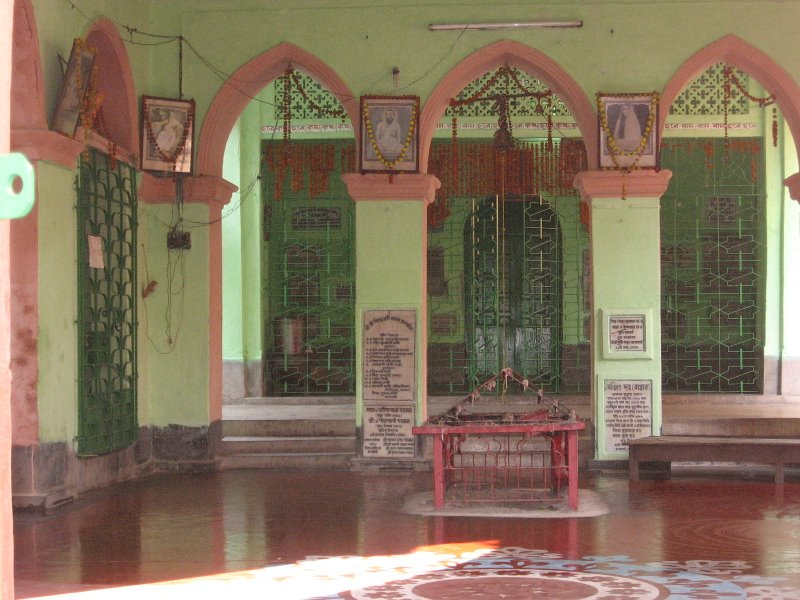
Siddeshwari Temple

== Economy ==
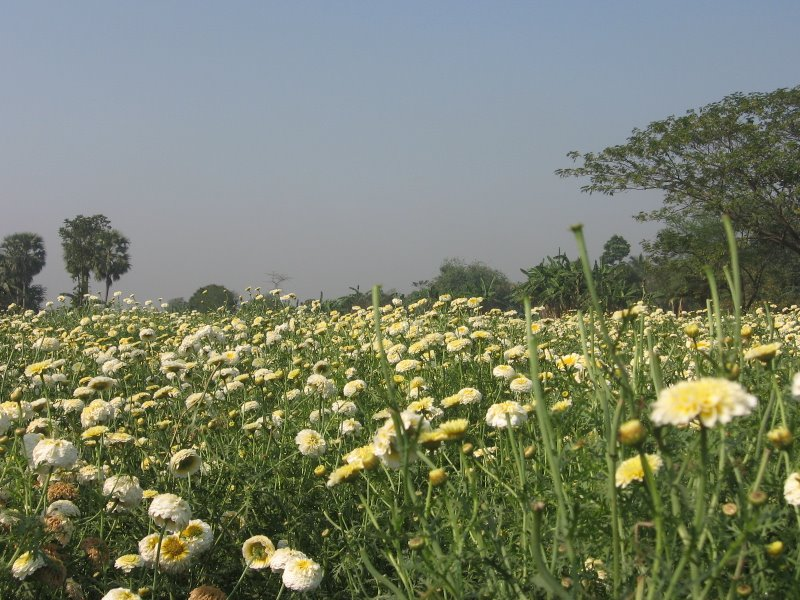
A farmland in Shankarpur, Ranaghat outskirt

Ranaghat is an important place of business. Small traders from nearby towns and villages purchase goods from Ranaghat Town Bazar. Both wholesale and retail business have developed here. The economy of Ranaghat and its surrounding region is mostly based on agriculture. Paddy (rice), flour, wheat and fruits are produced by farmers outside the main township. Various dairy products are transported to Kolkata every morning. A cold storage had been renovated by former chief minister Buddhadeb Bhattacharya at Nokari village, located on east half of the town.

The Department of Food Processing Industries of India was planning to set up a market complex exclusively for florists in Ranaghat. Ranaghat has one of the most capturing market of flowers in West Bengal.

Another industry which receives immense government patronage is handicraft and boutiques. At least a 1000 people depend on this for their livelihood. Aishtala (situated on the west bank of river Churni) is a place for textile weaving. Moreover, ready-made garments are trendy clothes of late became very popular among the teens and youths.

== Education ==
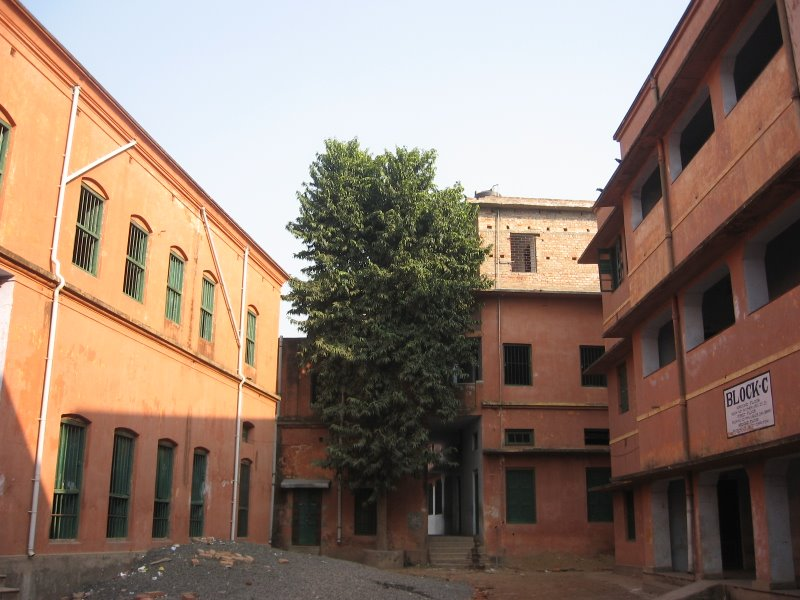
Pal Chaudhary High School

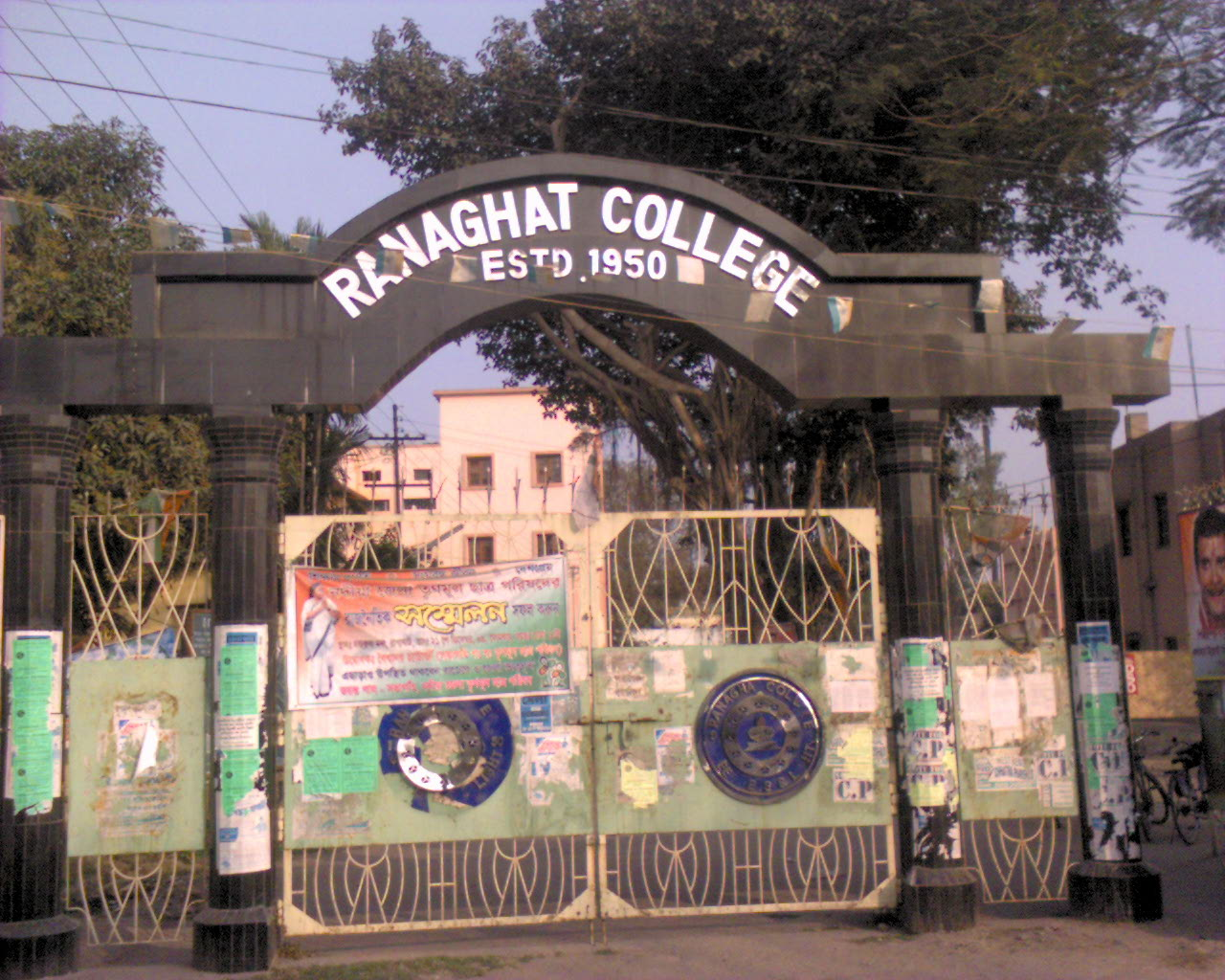
Ranaghat College Entrance

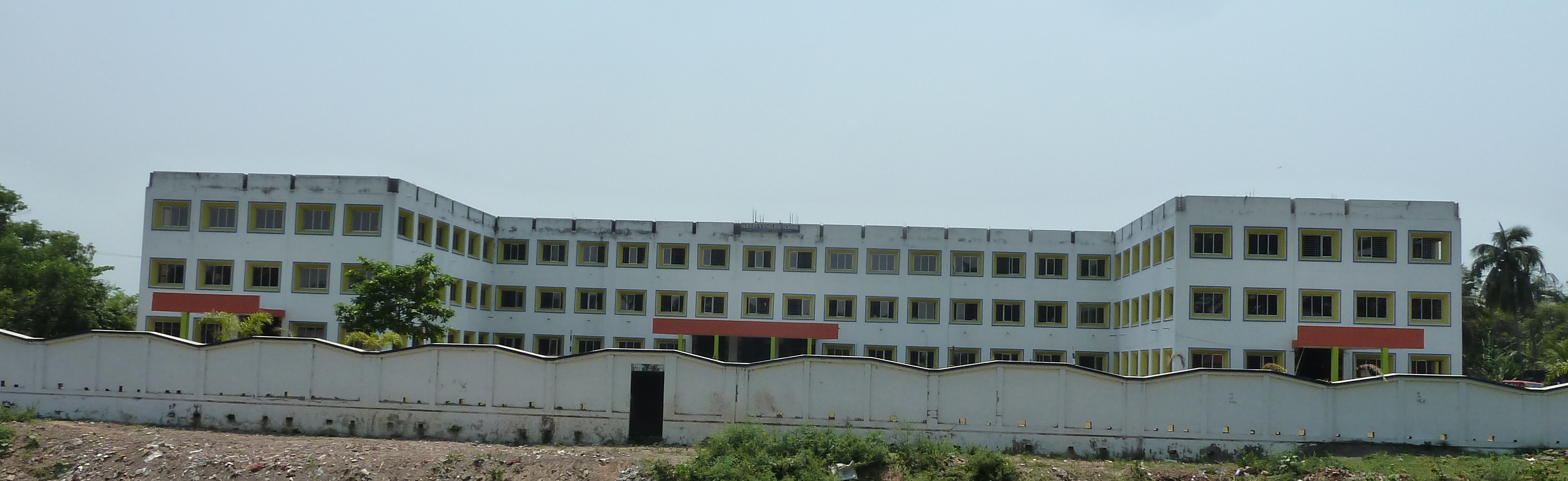
St Mary's English School

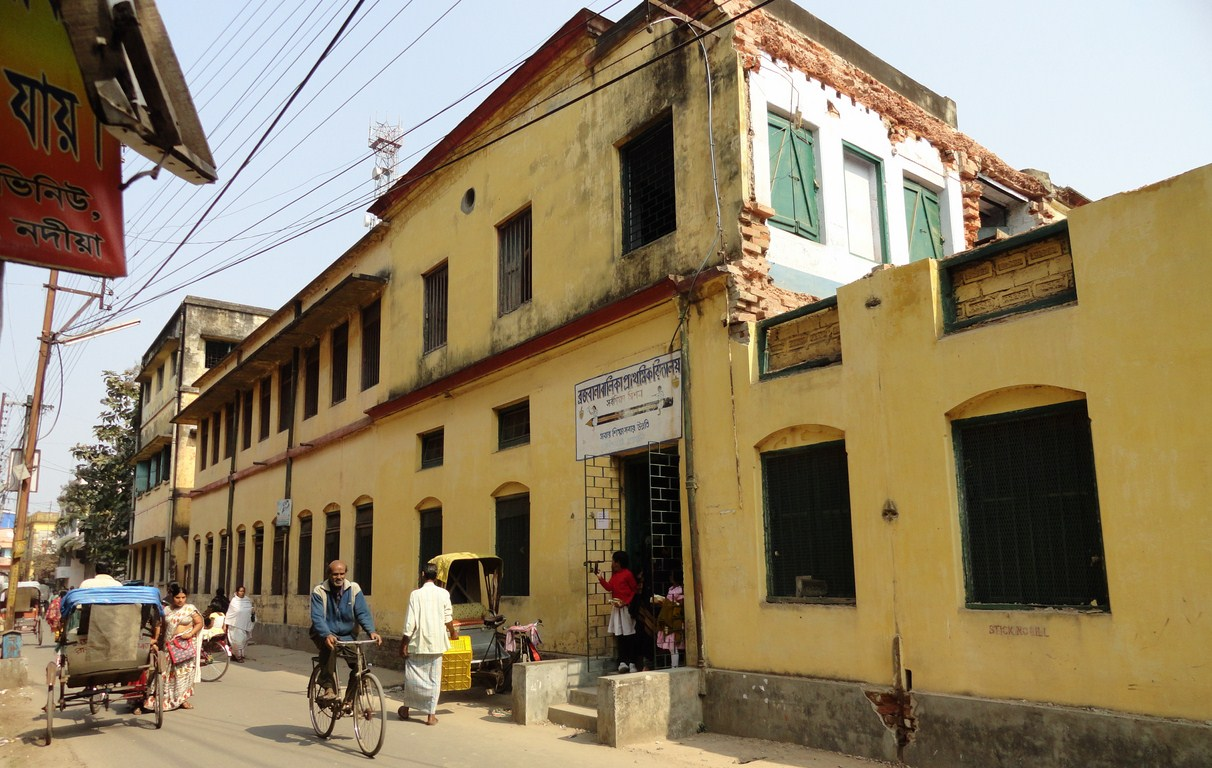
Brojobala Girls' High School

The town has a large number of primary and high schools and a college for higher education.

=== Schools ===
- Ramakrishna Vidyapith - Shakti Empowerment Education

=== High schools ===
Boys School

- Pal Choudhury High School (H.S)
- Ranaghat Lal Gopal High school
- Ranaghat Bharati High School (H.S)
- Ranaghat Yusuf Boys Institution
- Ranaghat Nasra Boys High School

Girls School

- Brajabala Girls' High School
- Ranaghat Debnath Girls High School
- Ranaghat Nasra Girls High School
- Ranaghat Pal Chowdhury Girls High School
- Ranaghat Yusuf Girls High School
- Ranaghat Lal Gopal Girls High School

English Medium School

- Convent of Jesus & Mary (CJM)
- St. Mary's High School
- St. Stephen's High School

=== Colleges ===
- Ranaghat College
- Ranaghat Government Polytechnic

== Culture ==
=== Festivals ===
The town is inhabited mostly by Bengali Hindus. Durga-puja and Kali puja, like in all other Bengali communities, are the largest and most colourful festivals and are celebrated throughout the town.

A Hindu festival called 'Dol yatra' is celebrated everywhere at the town. A village named 'Harinagar' is known for 'kirtan', a gathering of Hindu religious people in a motive to know God Krishna, is very popular.

History of the ancient rath yatra of Ranaghat: The history of Pal-Chowdhury and De-Chowdhury is closely associated with the Rath Yatra of the ancient city of Ranaghat. The 3 ancient chariots of Ranaghat are in the hands of this dynasty. Two different dynasties of the Pal Chowdhury ratha yatra in different ways. One is Krishnapanti and the other is Shambhupanti.

Muslim community also present in court para. The Christian community celebrates Christmas at Begopara Church outside the main township. During Christmas, people from all religions join the party. Moreover, there is a mosque at Nasra-para, on the outskirts of the town. Here people celebrate Eid, Durga Puja, Diwali and Christmas together.

== Transportation ==
=== Railways ===
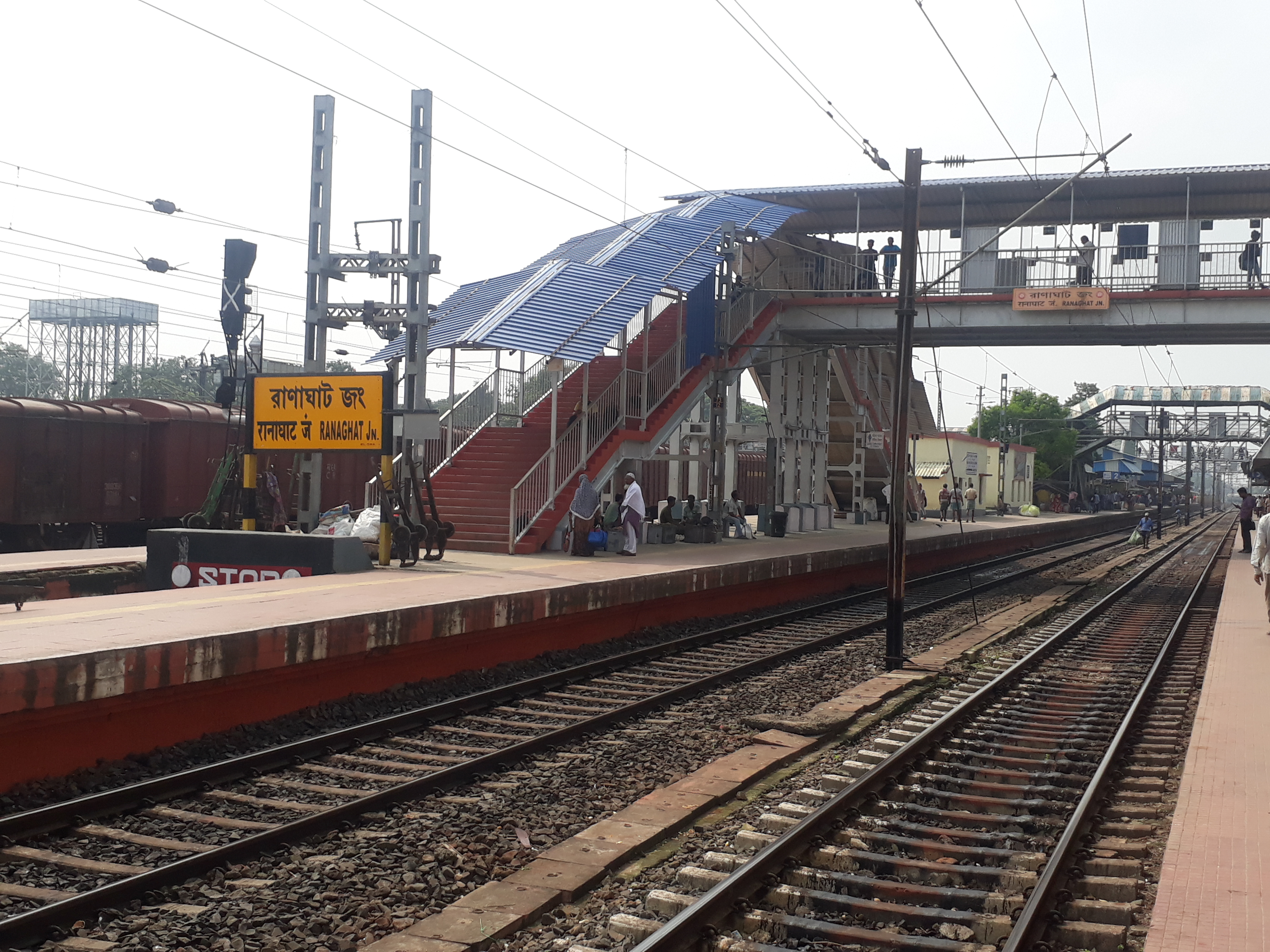
Ranaghat railway station

Ranaghat is one of the most important railway junctions in the Sealdah–Lalgola railway section. The "Maitree Express" linking Kolkata and Dhaka passes through Ranaghat.

The city is well connected to the Sealdah railway station through the Sealdah–Ranaghat line. Local and passenger trains are available frequently.

The railway station at Ranaghat has a long history. The Sealdah–Ranaghat rail connection was made during the British period. This main line was opened in September 1862. Ranaghat–Kalyani and Ranaghat–Shantipur sections were electrified in the financial year 1963–64.

From Ranaghat railway station, trains travel both north and south. Local trains are available to Krishnanagar City Junction, Shantipur, Gede, Bangaon, Baharampur and Sealdah. Couple of ladies-special trains were inaugurated in the year 2010.

=== Roadways ===
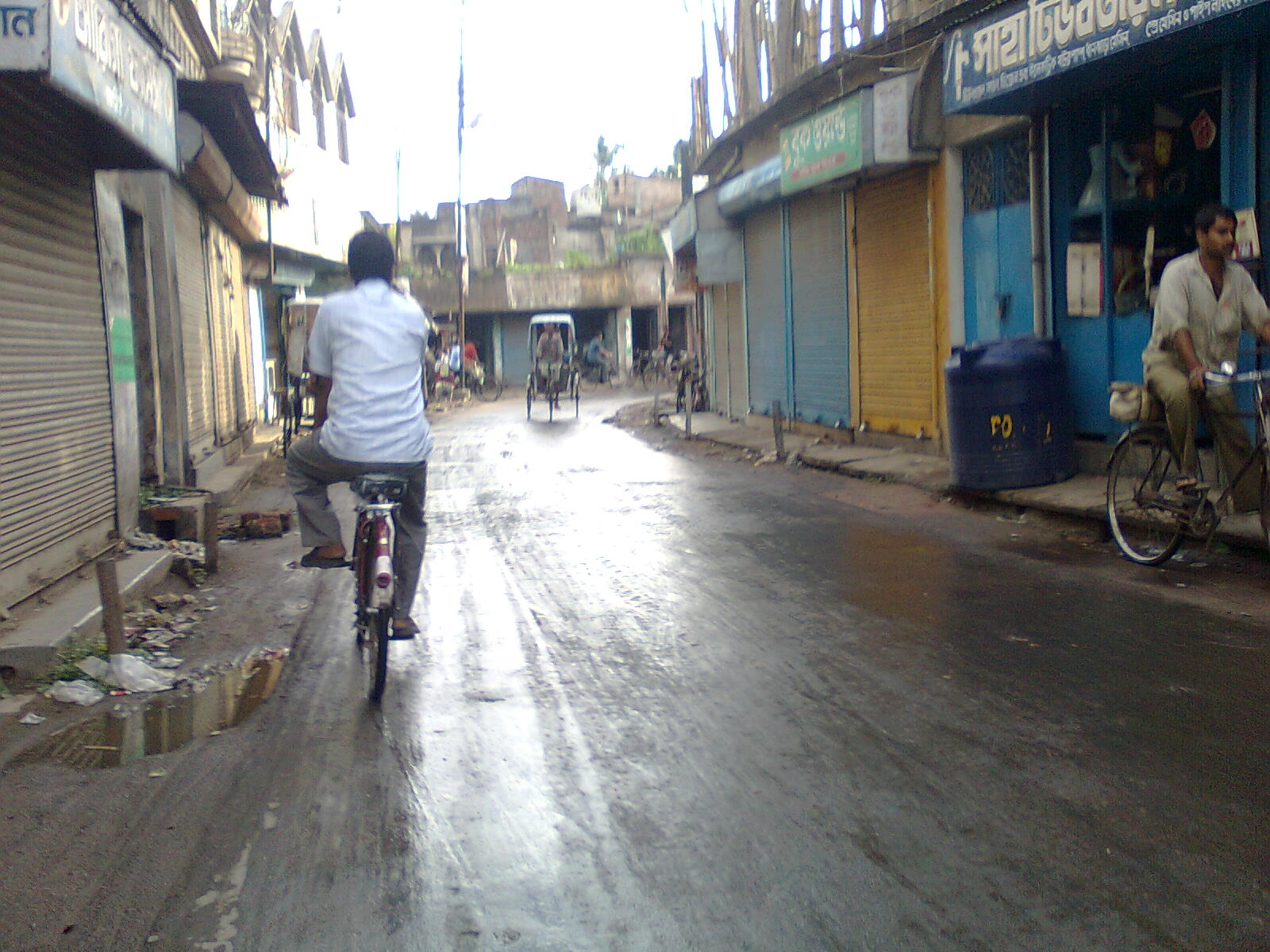
Streets of Ranaghat.

The town has three bus-stands, one at Rathtala, one near Ranaghat College and one over GNPC Road opposite police phari. CSTC buses plying from Kolkata going to North Bengal also has a stop at Ranaghat on NH-34. Buses ply to Krishnanagar, Hanskhali, Palashi and other parts of Nadia district. Long-distance night buses to north Bengal are also available. People in general, though prefer trains because of ready availability and more convenience.

SH 11 meets NH 12 at Ranaghat.

Auto rickshaw service are also available here.

=== Airways ===
The nearest airport from the town is the Netaji Subhash Chandra Bose International Airport at Dum Dum, almost 65 km from the city.

== Notable people ==
- Joy Goswami, poet and essayist
- Mausumi Dikpati, scientist at the High Altitude Observatory operated by the National Center for Atmospheric Research, USA
- Indrani Pal-Chaudhuri, ancestral place for this Indian-Canadian-British director and photographer
- Rakhee Gulzar, film actress
- Prabhat Kumar Mukhopadhyaya, a Bengali author best known for his biography of Rabindranath Tagore
- Soma Biswas, an internationally recognized athlete
- Susmita Bose, Indian-American scientist, Herbert and Brita Lindholm endowed Chair Professor, Washington State University
- Indranil Biswas, Indian-American Microbiologist. Fulbright Scholar.
- Nikhil Nandy, Indian Olympian
- Bholanath Bandyopadhyay, poet of the elegiac poem 'Ashru'.
