= Dakshinee =

- Founded: 8 May 1948
- Website: http://dakshinee.co.in

Dakshinee is one of the music academies in Kolkata. It primarily focuses on teaching and promoting the Rabindrasangeet.

== History ==
Suvo Guha Thakurta was a devotee of Rabindrasangeet. He wanted to spread it among Bengali masses which were then confined primarily to Santiniketan. On the advice of Shailaranjan Majumdar, he founded Dakshinee on 8 May 1948.

== Early days ==
Dakshinee started with only 12 students. By 1955 it had 600 students. Between 1962 and 1972 the student strength was over 1500.

== Sections ==
Since inception it has had four functioning sections:

- Rabindrasangeet
- Nrityakala Kendra (Dance School)
- Drama
- Cultural
- Publication

== Activities ==
- Dakshinee organised Triennial Tagore Music Conference from 1951 – 1960 with the assistance of All India Radio.
- Dakshinee celebrated the Tagore Centenary in 1961.

== Publications ==
- Rabindrasangeeter Dhara – Suvo Guha Thakurta wrote the book titled "Rabindrasangeeter Dhara" in 1950, about Tagore's compositions. In this book he classified Rabindrasangeet into 17 streams or 'Parjyay', as opposed to only 4 streams or 'Parjay' in 'Geetabitan'. This classification helps to understand Rabindrasangeet and the philosophy behind it by analysing the intertwined poetry, the legacy of Hindustani classical music as well as Rabindranath's original creations. This book is part of the academic curriculum of Dakshinee.
- Subarno Joyonti Barsha (Shahitya Patra)
- Rabindra Janma Satabarshiki
- Rajat Joyonti Utsab

In 2008, Dakshinee proposed to publish a special edition on the occasion of its Diamond Jubilee Celebrations.

== Location ==
This institute was earlier started at 132, Rashbehari Avenue. In 1955, it was moved to Dakshinee Bhawan, 1 Deshapriya Park (West) where it has remained.

== Affiliated institutes ==
- Nupur in London (Currently withdrawn)
- Rabishikha in North London
- Dakshinayan in South London
- Robiprobash in Toronto
- Kahlar in Washington, D.C. (Currently withdrawn)
- Uttarayan in New Delhi
- Srijon in Mumbai

== Notable teachers ==
- Suchitra Mitra
- Subinoy Roy
- Sudeb Guha Thakurta
- Kamala Basu
- Sunil Kumar Roy
- Subhas Choudhury
- Ashoktaru Bandhapadhay
- Rano Guha Thakurta

== Prominent students ==
- Ritu Guha
- Rano Guha Thakurta
- Saheb Chatterjee
- Krishna Guha Thakurta
- Srikanta Acharya
- Debasish Roy Chowdhury
- Prabuddha Raha
- Shekhar Gupta
- Shreya Guhathakurta
- Kamalini Mukherji

== Controversies ==
Although the institute professes to teach Rabindranath Tagore's ideals through his music, it has been alleged that Dakshinee believes in instilling a sense of fear among the rank and file of its students, an idea that is contrary to Tagore's own views on any kind of learning.

Dakshinee follows its own discrete notation, disregarding the notation accepted and printed by the bishwa-bharati.

== See also ==
- Bengal Music College
- Calcutta School of Music
- Eastern fare music foundation
