= Santosh Thakur =

- Birth name: Santosh Thakur
- Born: 17 September 1922; Kolkata, Bengal Presidency, British India
- Died: 13 January 2000 (aged 77); Kolkata, West Bengal, India
- Genres: Rabindrasangeet
- Occupations: Singer/Organizer
- Years active: 1958–2000
- Labels: Hindustan Records

Santosh Thakur (1922–2000) was a Bengali singer from Kolkata, India. He is primarily known as a Rabindrasangeet artist. He was the son of Sanskrit scholar Amareswar Thakur.

== Career ==
Santosh Thakur made an entry into the world of Rabindrasangeet in the early 1950s. He started taking regular Rabindrasangeet lessons under the tutelage of Sri. Subinoy Roy, Sri. Anadi Dastidar and others. Was a regular Artist of All India Radio, he started performing as a Rabindrasangeet singer at Akashvani, Kolkata. He recorded two Tagore’s songs, "Tomari Jhornatolar Nirjone" and "Amar Nishito Ratero" (1966) with Hindustan Records under the training of his Guru Sri Subinoy Roy.

He founded a musical institution in Kolkata named 'Gandharvi' in the year 1963, where students learned Rabindrasangeet under his training also under the tutelage of Sri. Subinoy Roy, Smt. Sumitra Sen Smt. Bani Thakur Smt. Swapna Ghoshal . 'Gandharvi' was a popular institution and was also known for its regular performance of various concerts and Dance Dramas of Tagore. In the year 1971 'Gandharvi' was invited by The Bengalee Association of Hyderabad to perform 3 dance dramas of Tagore namely 'Tasher Desh', 'Shapmochan' and 'Mayar Khyala'.
