= Zinga Goshty =

Bangladeshi band

Zinga Goshty জিংগা শিল্পগোষ্ঠী
- Also known as: Zinga Shilpi Goshty
- Origin: Chattogram, Bangladesh
- Members: Shafaat Ali; Najma Zaman; Shaila Zaman; Nirghat Ali; Shayan Ali; Nazia Sharmin; Nahia Ali

Zinga Goshty is a Bangladeshi family band consisting of siblings Shafaat, Najma, Shaila, Nirghat, Shayan, Nazia, and Nahia. It is one of the earliest Bangladeshi pop bands and its first orchestra band formed in 1963 in Chattogram, Bangladesh (erstwhile East Pakistan).

== History ==
The band was formed on 4 March 1963, by Shafaat Ali. Their song Tomari Jeebone is considered timeless.

== Members ==
- Shafaat Ali
- Najma Zaman
- Shaila Zaman
- Nirghat Ali
- Shayan Ali
- Nazia Sharmin
- Nahia Ali
