= Shreya Guhathakurta =

Indian Rabindra Sangeet singer (born 1975)

Shreya guhathakurta শ্রেয়া গুহঠাকুরতা
- Born: 3 February 1975 (age 51); Kolkata, West Bengal, India
- Occupation: vocalist
- Years active: 1979–present
- Known for: Rabindra Sangeet singer
- Spouse: Sujoy Mazumder

Shreya Guhathakurta (শ্রেয়া গুহঠাকুরতা; 3 February 1975) is an Indian Rabindra Sangeet singer.

== Early life ==
Shreya Guhathakurta was born into a family of renowned musicians. She began learning music at the age of four. She is the daughter of film and television actress Saswati Guhathakurta and Bhishma Guhathakurta. She lent her voice as a playback artist at the age of six for the film, "Deepar Prem", directed by late Arundhuti Devi. Shreya also acted in this film.

Later at the age of 15, she lent her voice as a playback singer for the National Award-winning film ‘Antardhan’ directed by late Tapan Sinha. Shreya is the granddaughter of late Suvo Guhathakurta, founder of two of the Rabindrasangeet institutions in Kolkata - Gitabitan & Dakshinee. She received formal training and diploma from Dakshinee, graduating in 1994.

Guhathakurta graduated with distinction and continued her training under her paternal uncle, Sudeb Guhathakurta. From an early age, she also received musical training from Kanika Bandyopadhyay. She is also the niece of recently deceased Rabindrasangeet exponent, Smt Ritu Guha.

== Career ==
Shreya has performed all over the world. Her recent shows were held is Singapore, Canada, Bangladesh, U.K, Paris, Australia, Berlin and U.S.A. Shreya is a regular artist on television channels such as ‘‘Tara Muzik’’ and "Channel I".

She recorded 12 songs for the Bengal Foundation, Dhaka, and her album titled Baje Koruno Shure was released in 2012. Shreya has several CD's to her credit. Some of these are titled Bimlo Anande and Shurer Doriyay, which were released in Bangladesh. Saregama has released her albums "Mon Bhulay Re", "Antabiheen Poth", "Anandadhara", and "Khanchar Pakhi".

Guhathakurta has recorded over 800 songs for Tara Muzik and also recorded several songs for the Gitabitan Archive released by Saregama. Shreya has performed in Tagore's dance dramas like Shyama, Chandalika, and Chitrangada, touring cities in India including Delhi, Baroda, Hyderabad, Bangalore, Ranchi, and Jamshedpur.

Shreya Guhathakurta does online Rabindrasangeet workshops over Skype for Bengali students settled in London and Paris.

== Awards ==
Shreya was awarded the ’Shyamal Sen Smrriti Puroshkar’ for her contribution to music and culture. Shreya was awarded by Radio Big FM in Kolkata as the best singer in Rabindrasangeet category for the year 2011.

== Musical style ==
Her musical style and vocal renditions have been compared by critics to those of Kanika Bandyopadhyay, noting her combination of traditional gharana elements with modern presentation.
