= Manas Chakraborty =

Background information
- Born: 9 September 1942; Barishal, Bengal Presidency, British India
- Origin: Barishal, Bangladesh
- Died: 12 December 2012 (aged 70) Kolkata, India
- Genre: Indian classical music
- Occupation: musician
- Years active: 1950–2012
- Website: manaschakraborty.com

Pandit Manas Chakraborty (Bengali: মানস চক্রবর্তী Maanosh Chokrobortee) (9 September 1942 – 12 December 2012) was an Indian classical vocalist. He was taught music by his father Tarapada Chakraborty. Chakraborty performed at many music conferences and programs including the Allauddin Music Conference (1976), the 5th RIMPA Music Festival (Benaras, 1984), and the Sawai Gandharva Sangeet Mahotsav (Pune, 1984). He was a writer and composer, and used the pseudonym Sadasant or Sadasant Piya for composing bandishes. He composed many Bengali songs. He wrote a book with Bengali poems named "Tumio Bhetore Neel Nakhastra" edited by Maitrayee Bandyopadhyay and published by Pratibhas Publication.

== Awards ==
- Heritage Samman by Heritage World Society, Tower Group (2012)
- Sangeet Samman Award, Presented by The Dover Lane Music Conference (2011)
- Dishari Award (Twice) – West Bengal Journalists' Association
- Maharishi Award (1987) – Maharishi World Centre of Gandharva Veda at U.K. Roydon Hall
- Girija Shankar Memorial Award (1989) – Girija Shankar Smriti Parishad
- Jadubhatta Award (1995) – Salt Lake Cultural Association, Kolkata
- Outstanding Citizen Award (2000) – English Teaching Union.
- Award for his excellence at 15th Master Dinanath Mangeshkar Sangeet Sammellan – Samrat Sangeet Academy (Goa).
- Felicitated by Rotary International
- Felicitated by Dover Lane Music Conference (1992) on his 50th birth-anniversary
- Felicitated by Kotalipara Sammelani (2000)
- Felicitated by Samatat for his contribution in the field of Indian Arts and Music
- Lifetime Achievement Award from Mohanananda Brahmachari Sishu Seva Pratisthan
