= Prabhat Kumar Mukhopadhyaya =

Indian writer (1892–1985)

- Born: 27 July 1892; Ranaghat, Bengal Presidency, British India (now in Nadia District, West Bengal, India)
- Died: 7 November 1985 (aged 93); Santiniketan, Birbhum District, West Bengal, India
- Occupations: Scholar, author
- Spouse: Sudhamoyee
- Writing career
- Notable work: Rabindrajibani o Rabindra Sahitya Prabeshak (4 Volumes) (Biographical book on Rabindranath Tagore in 4 volumes)
- Notable awards: 1981: Padma Bhusan

Prabhat Kumar Mukhopadhyaya (27 July 1892 – 7 November 1985) was a Bengali writer best known for his biography of poet Rabindranath Tagore.

== Early life ==
He started his early life at Giridih, now in Jharkhand, where his father Nagendranath Mukhopadhyaya was a lawyer. In 1907, he was turned out of his school for participating in Banga Bhanga movement (Swadeshi movement). In 1908, he stood fifth in the entrance examination of the National Council of Education.

== At Santiniketan ==
He joined National Council of Education college at Bowbazar in Kolkata. There he had inspiring teachers like Benay Kumar Sarkar and Radhakumud Mukherjee, but he could not continue his studies because of ill health and death of his father. After coming in contact with Rabindranath Tagore, he arrived at Santiniketan in 1909, where had some informal education and joined as a school teacher in 1910. He was librarian of the City College at Kolkata during 1916–18. He returned to Santiniketan as a librarian and school teacher in 1918. In 1926, he was appointed as a professor in the college section.

== Works ==
Rabindra Parichay Sabha, which he had founded, assigned him the task of writing the biography of the poet. It took around a quarter of a century to complete the project. The first volume, published in 1933, was the only one the poet himself could see. The four-volume Rabindra Jivani laid the foundation for further research on Rabindranath. His other books on the poet were: Rabindra Grantha Panji (1932), Rabindra Jiban Katha, Rabi Katha, Rabindranather Chenasuna Manush, Santiniketan Visva Bharati, Rabindranather Gaan – Kalanukromik Suchi etc.

Mukhopadhyaya was a profound scholar and writer. He wrote Prachin Itihaser Galpo (1912), Bharat Parichay (1921), Bharatey Jatio Andolan (1925) and Banga Parichay in two volumes (1936 & 1941). He wrote Gyanbharati, a short encyclopedia for children. When the noted orientalist Sylvain Lévi came to Santiniketan, he learnt Chinese and Tibetan from him and engaged in research in that area.

== Honours ==
In 1965, he was honoured with Deshikottama. Other universities conferred the honorary D.Lit. degree on him. He was honoured with a Padma Bhusan in 1981.

== Personal life ==
He married Sudhamoyee, daughter of the Brahmo theologian Sitanath Tattwabhushan. One of the earlier period students of Santiniketan, she was founder of the Bolpur Balika Vidyalaya and was its headmistress for many years. Mukhopadhyaya spent his retired life in his own house at Bhubandanga in Bolpur. He died on 8 November 1985.
