= Tarapada Chakraborty =

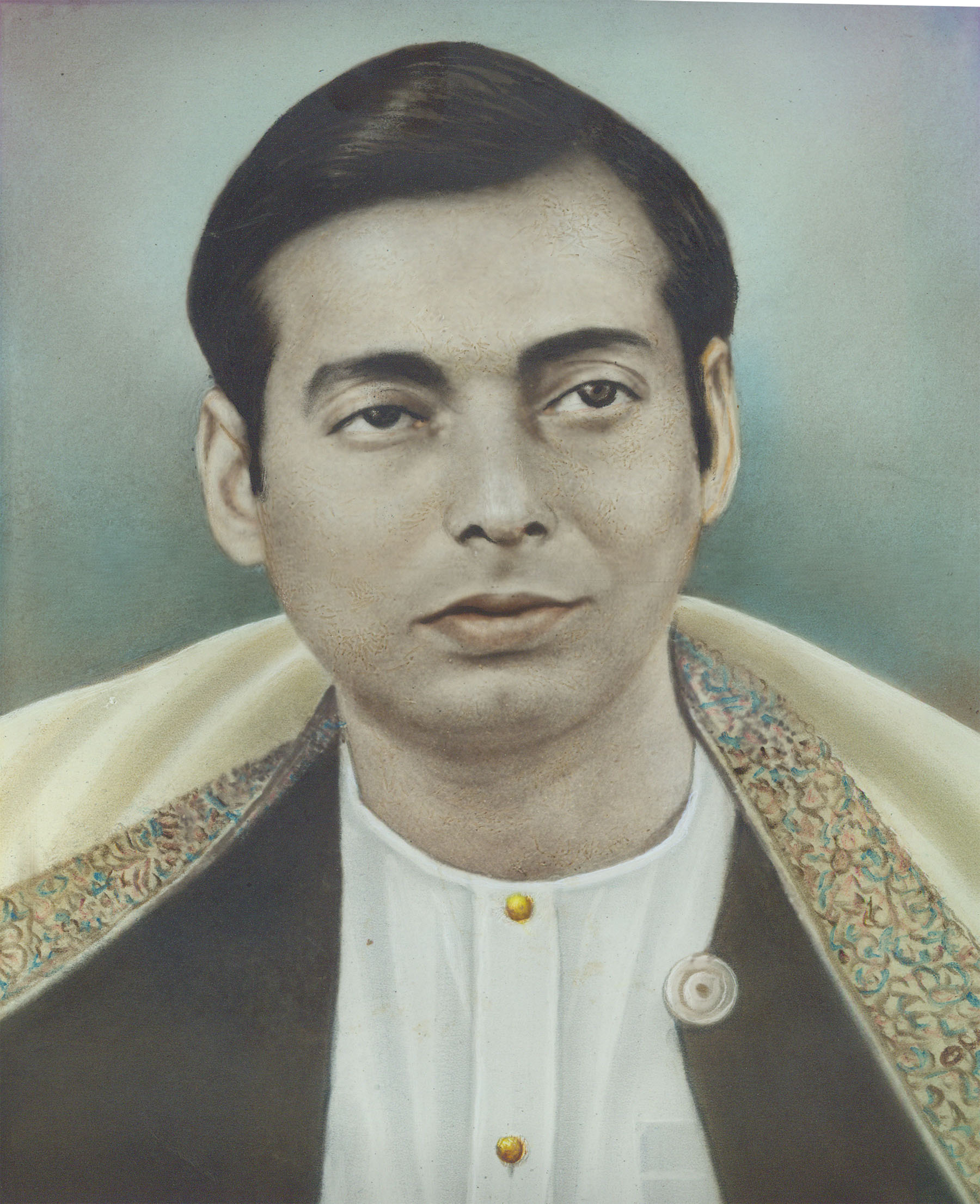

Background information
- Born: Tarapada Chakraborty; 1 April 1909; Kotalipara, Bengal, British India
- Died: 1 September 1975 (aged 66) Calcutta, West Bengal, India
- Genres: Indian classical music
- Occupation: Singer
- Years active: 1925–1975
- Website: tarapadachakraborty.com

Tarapada Chakraborty (1 April 1909 – 1 September 1975) was an Indian classical vocalist. He was born in Kotalipara, Faridpur, Bengal Presidency (now in Bangladesh) to a Vedic Brahmin family. He is known for the khyal and thumri forms of singing, as well as for his popular renditions of Raagpradhans. He is the pioneer of the Kotali Gharana which is best known for its slow rendition of alap while presenting a raga. He was the first Indian classical artiste to have presented any Raaga in 48-beats vilambit format, which is considered to be a difficult rendition in itself. He is the creator of Raaga Chhaya Hindol and Navamalaka.

In 1972, he was awarded the Sangeet Natak Akademi Fellowship the highest honour conferred by Sangeet Natak Akademi, India's National Academy for Music, Dance and Drama. He was the recipient of State Academy Award from Rabindra Bharati University in 1972.
