= Subinoy Roy =

Indian singer

- Subinoy Roy
- Born: 8 November 1921; Calcutta, Bengal Presidency, British India
- Died: 9 January 2004 (aged 82); Kolkata, West Bengal, India
- Spouse: Indira Roy (m. 1946)
- Children: Surajit Roy; Suranjan Roy
- Parent(s): Bimalangshu Prakash Roy (father); Sukhamoyee Devi (mother)
- Relatives: Sitanath Tattwabhushan (maternal grandfather); Prabhat Kumar Mukhopadhyaya (maternal aunt's husband)

Subinoy Roy (8 November 1921 – 9 January 2004) was an Indian singer, considered one of the best-known exponents of the Rabindra Sangeet.

== Early life ==
Subinoy Roy was born to Bimalangshu Prakash Roy and Sukhamoyee Devi at Kolkata. His father was chief chemist at the then American multinational Bird & Company and a literati, associated with Sukumar Ray's Nonsense Club. Roy was initiated to Rabindra Sangeet by his mother at a very early age. His mother Sukhamoyee Devi was the youngest daughter of philosopher-scholar Pandit Sitanath Tattwabhushan. Later, while studying chemistry at the graduation level at Visva-Bharati University, Santiniketan, he came in contact with Maestro Shailajaranjan Majumder and started learning Rabindra Sangeet from him. He learned Indian Classical Music from Ramesh Chandra Bandyopadhyay and Girija Shankar Chakrabarty.

== Profession ==
At some time, he left Shantiniketan and pursued studying library science in England and joined Indian Statistical Institute as a librarian. Still, he became renowned as a teacher of Rabindra Sangeet that too for being an authority in Rabindra Sangeet in its purest form. He became a regular artist of Rabindra Sangeet in All India Radio in 1943. His first gramophone record was released on 1949, with two songs; "তুমি ডাক দিয়েছ কোন সকালে" and "এই করেছ ভালো".

Though Subinoy was a puritan in his rendition of Rabindra Sangeet, he was adaptable and open to liberalization. Once interviewed on the expiry of the copyright of the songs written by Rabindranath Tagore, Subinoy Roy expressed:

"I'm not sure where all these do's and don'ts came from.... Rabindranath liked the esraj, violin, flute and tabla with his songs, but if the guitar, synthesizer and drums existed at the time, I'm sure he would have tried those out too. At least he wouldn't reject them if they made his songs sound better."

== Death ==
Roy died in a hospital in Kolkata four days after his wife's death.

== Bibliography ==
- Roy, Subinoy (1379 BS – 1972). রবীন্দ্র সংগীত সাধনা (Rabindra Sangeet Sadhana), A Mukherjee and Sons:Kolkata.
