= West Bengal =

State in eastern India

- State
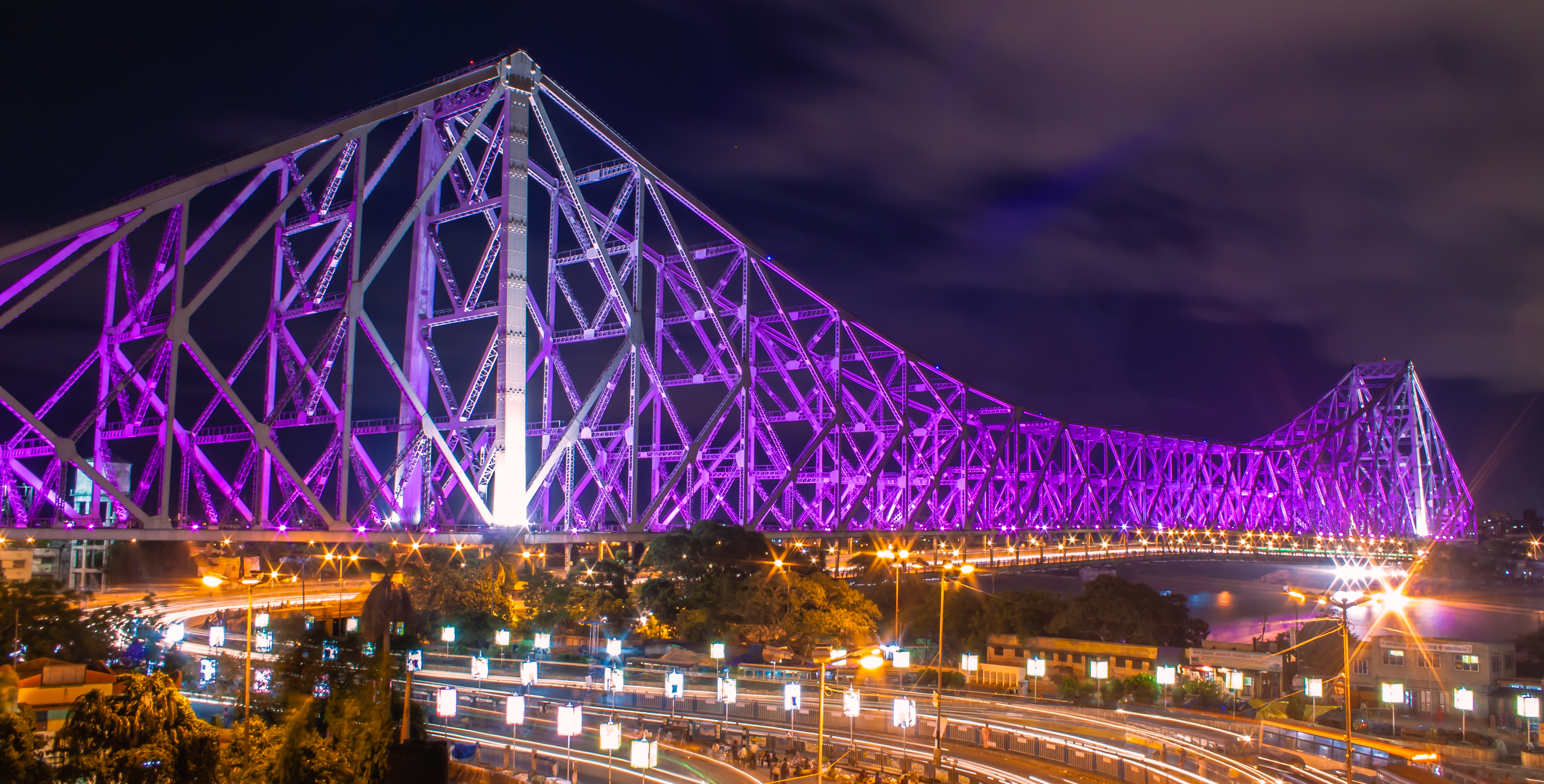
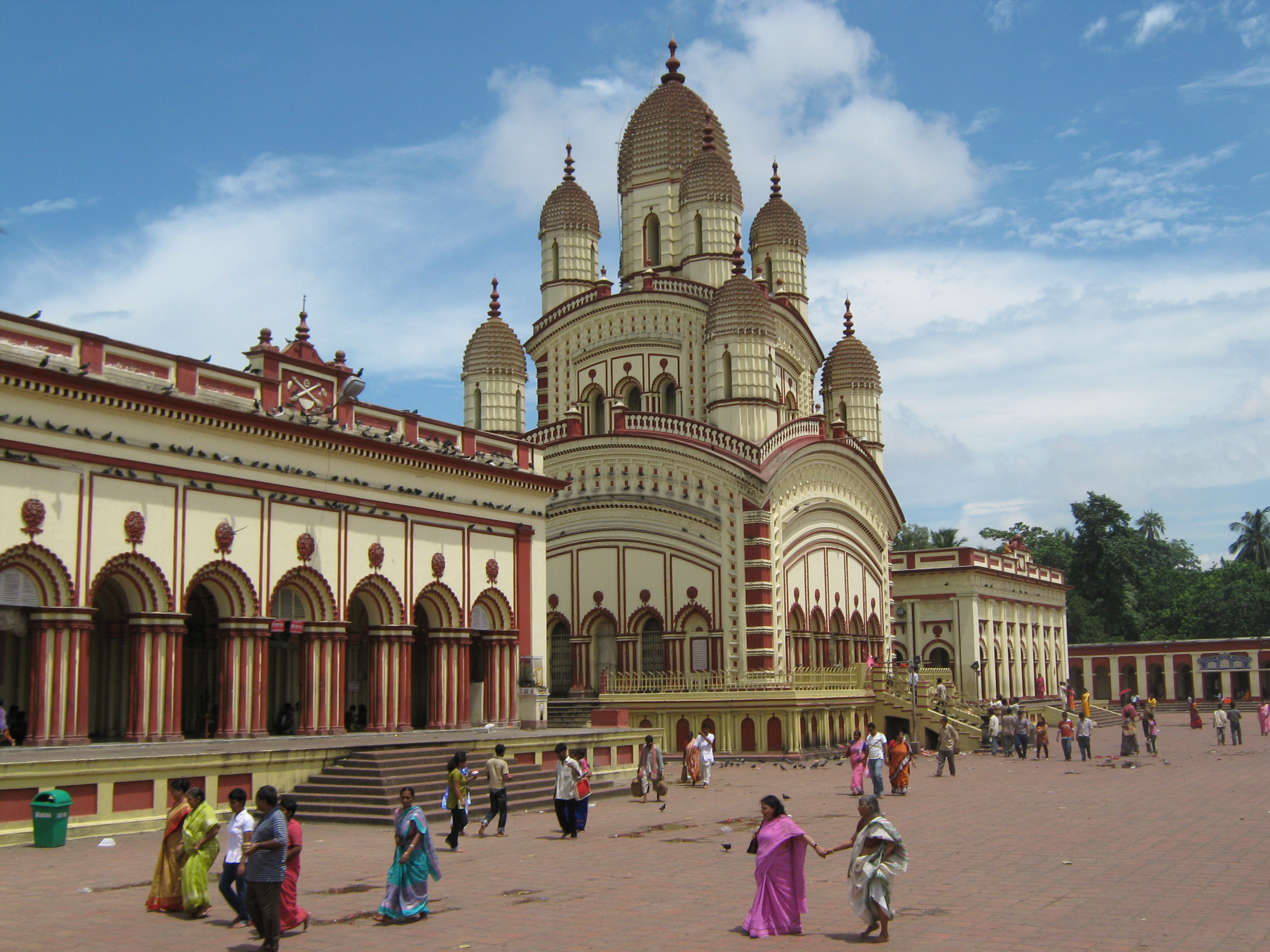
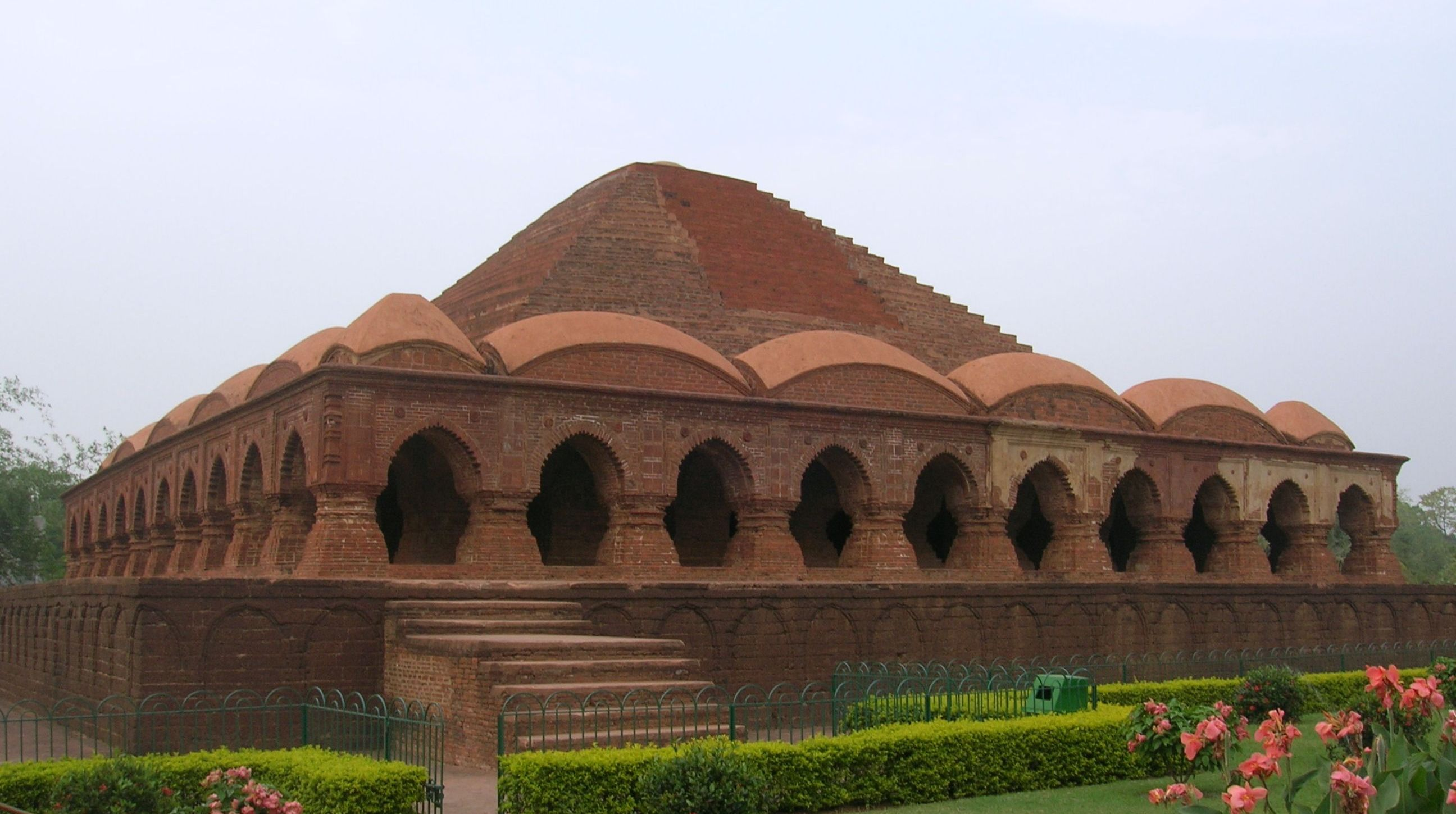
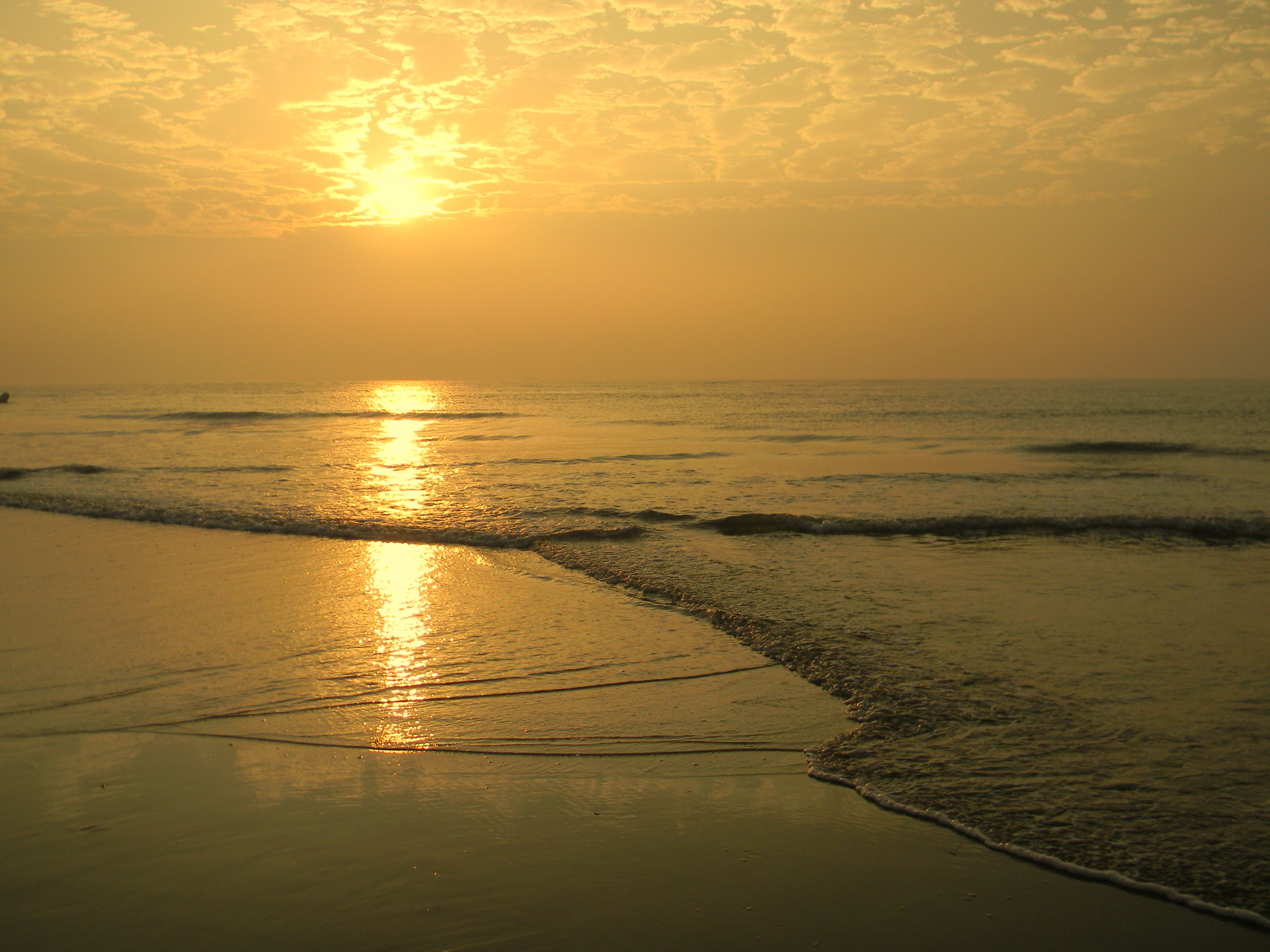
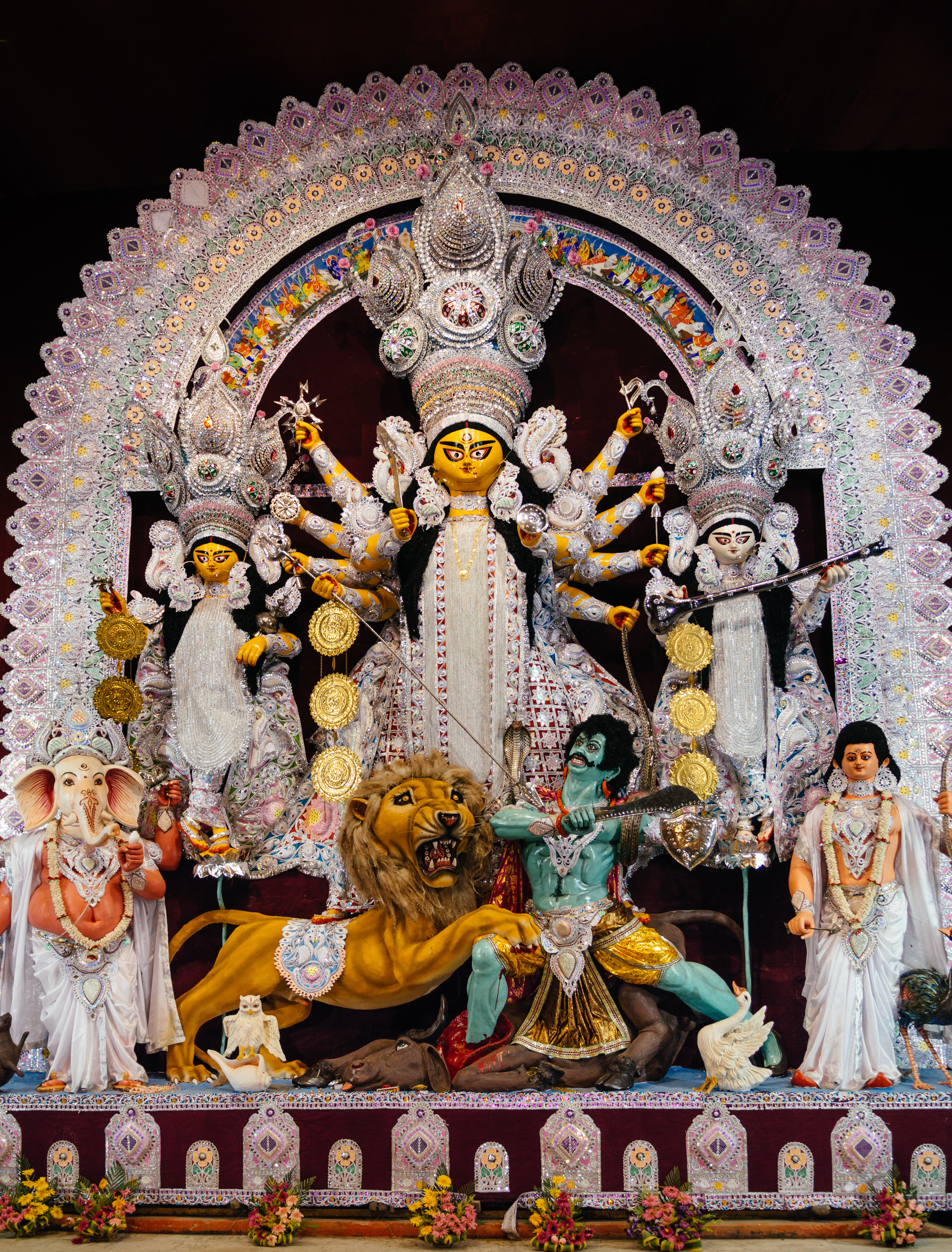
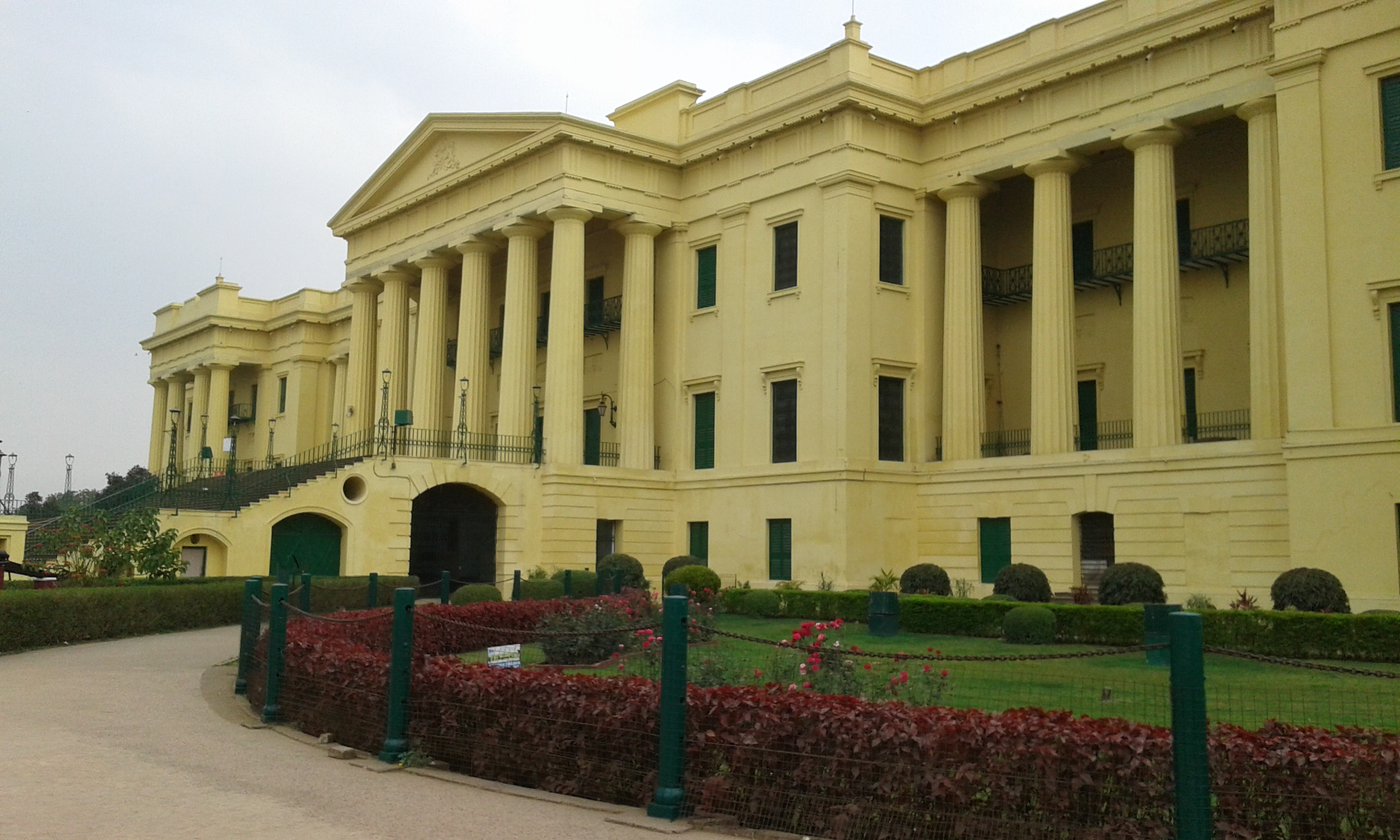
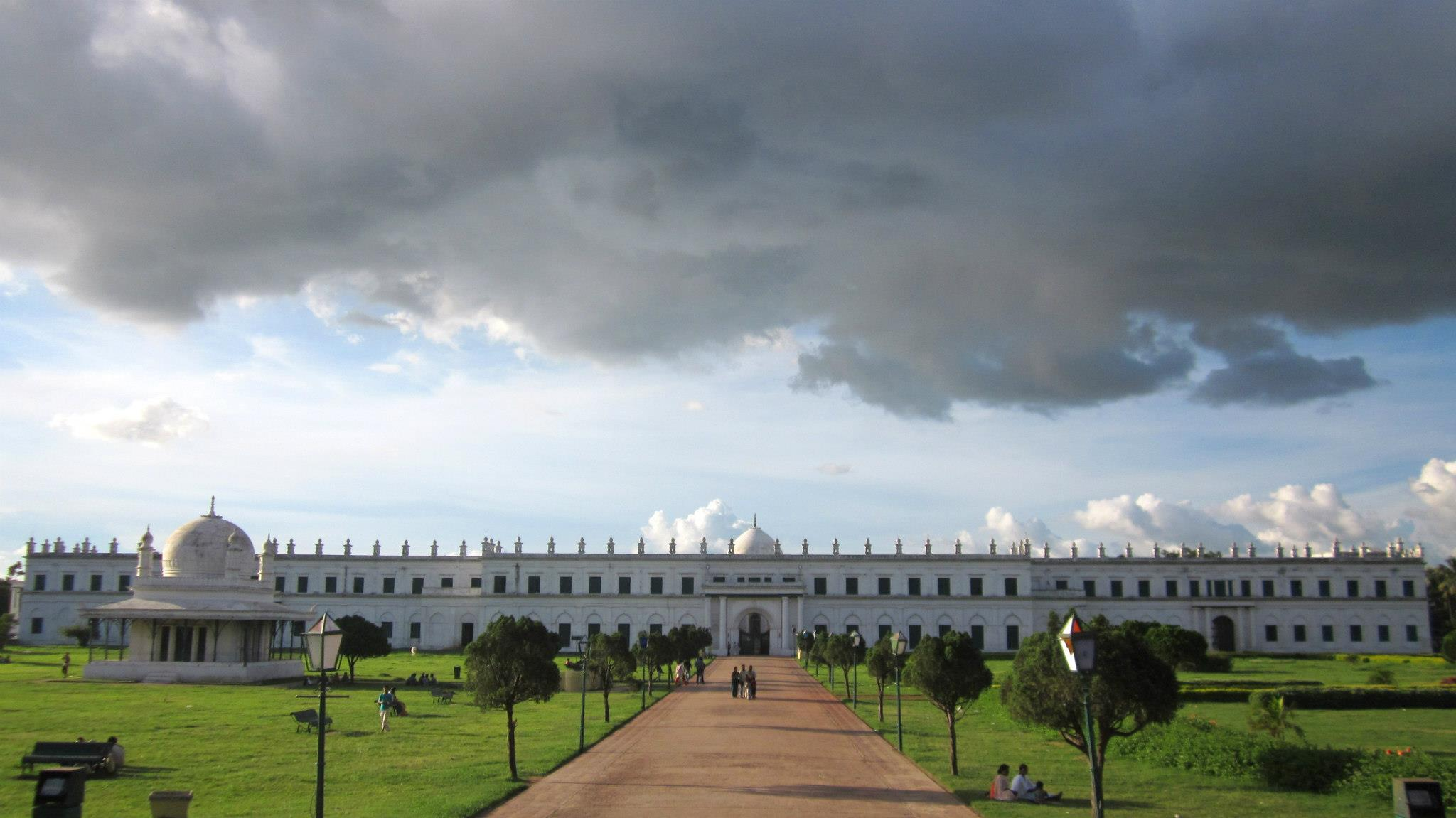
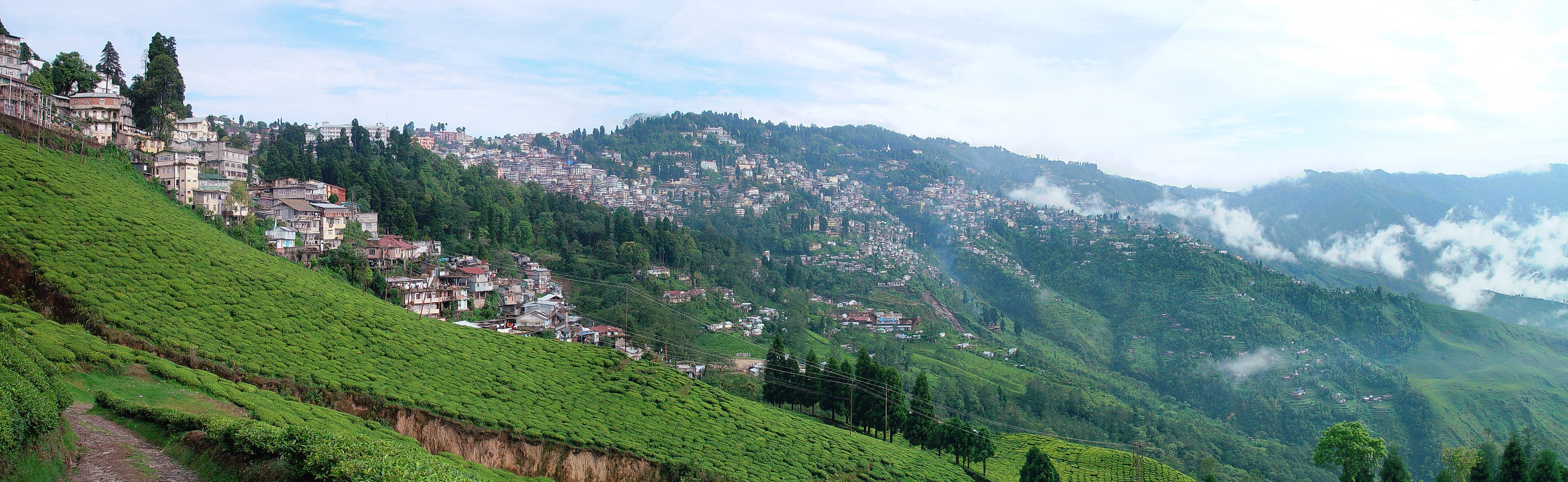
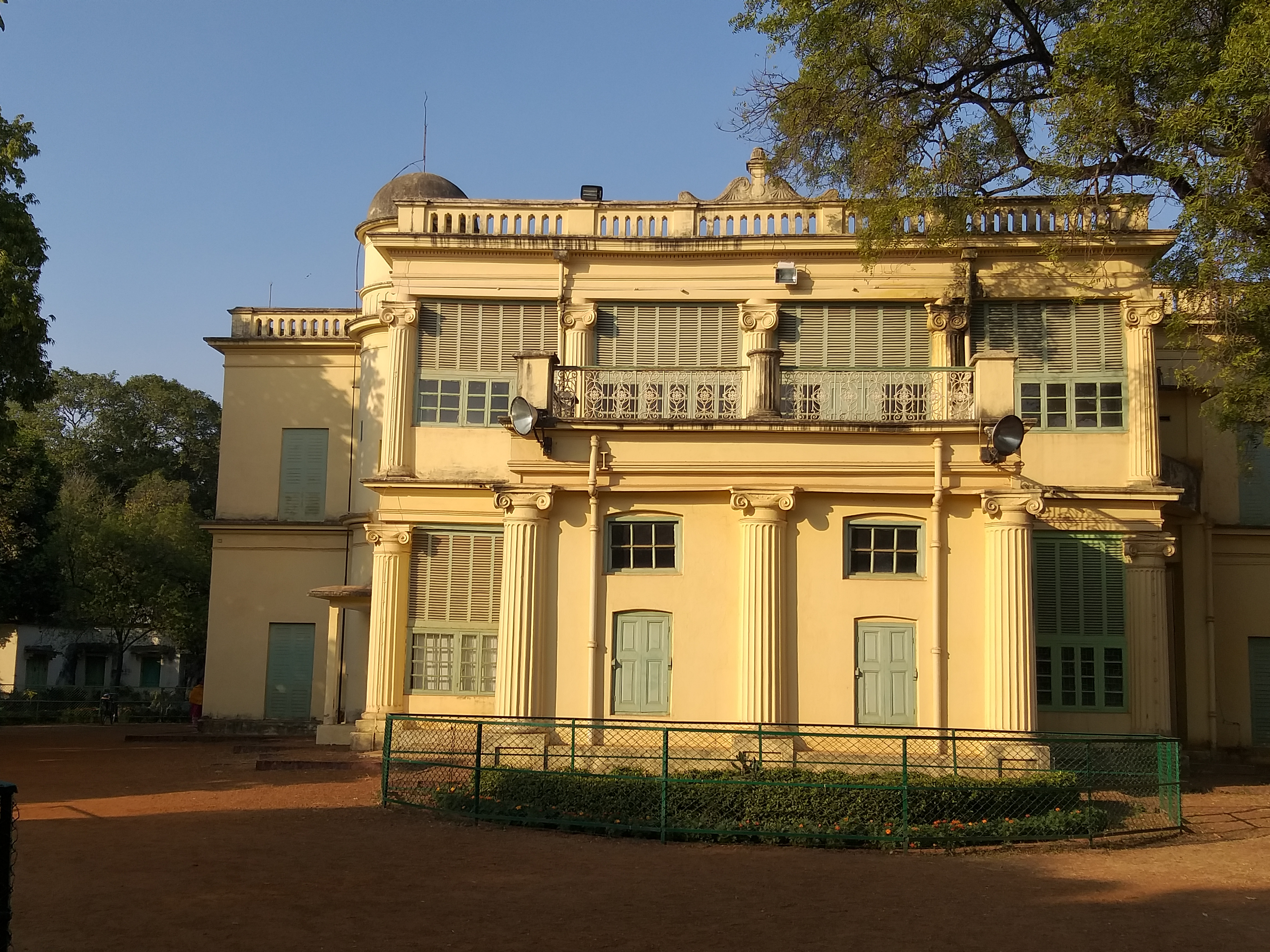
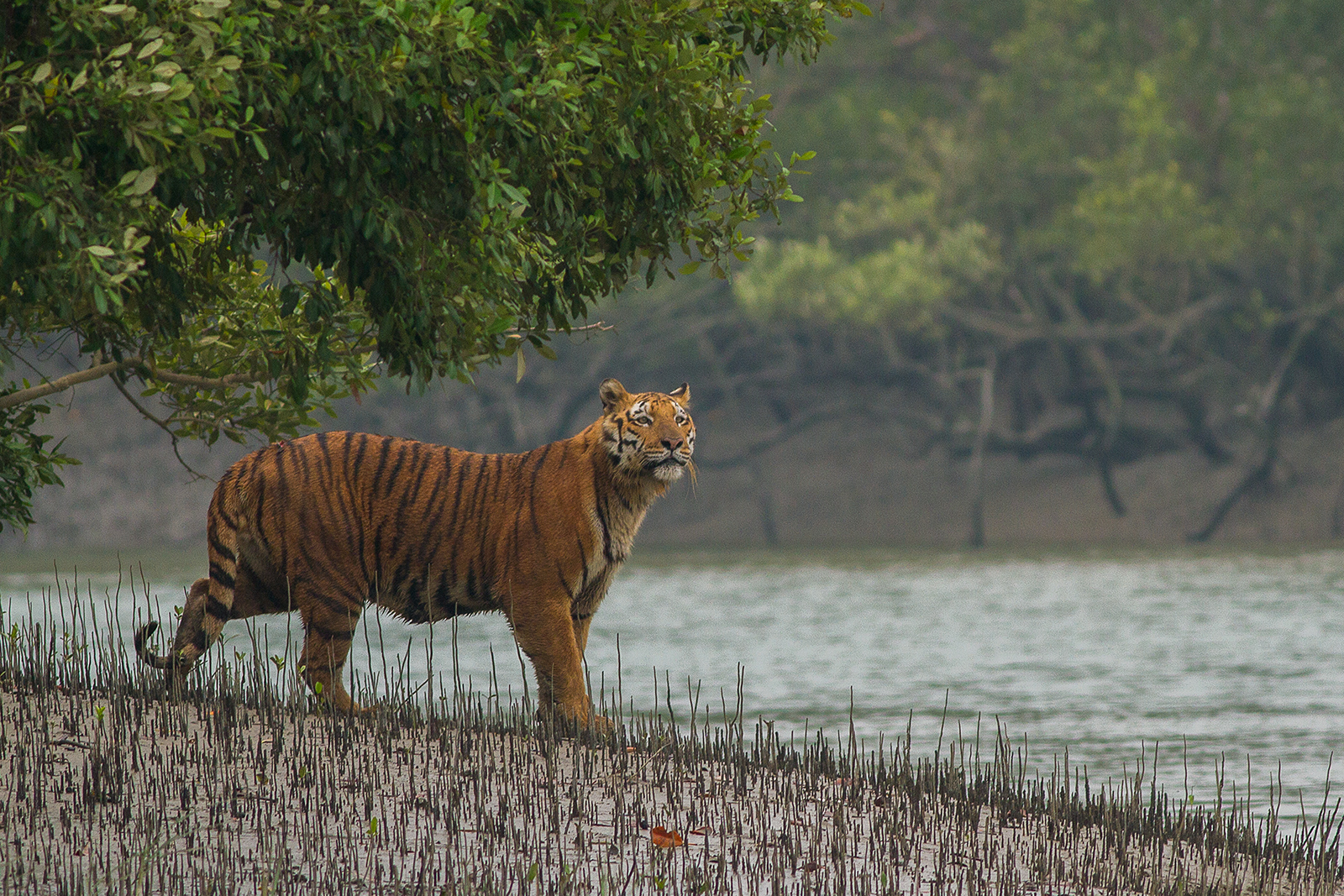
- Howrah Bridge Dakshineswar Kali Temple Rasmancha Digha sea beach Durga Puja Hazarduari Palace Nizamat Imambara Darjeeling Santiniketan Bengal Tiger in the Sundarbans

- Emblem of West Bengal
- Etymology: Western side of Undivided Bengal
- Nickname: "Hub of all Cultural traits"
- Motto: Satyameva Jayate (Truth Alone Triumphs)
- Anthem: Banglar Mati Banglar Jol (The Soil of Bengal, The Water of Bengal)
- Location of West Bengal in India
- Coordinates: 22.57°N 88.37°E
- Country: India
- Region: East India
- Previously was: Bengal Province
- Formation (by bifurcation): 15 August 1947
- Capital and largest city: Kolkata
- Largest metro: Kolkata Metropolitan Region
- Districts: 23 (5 divisions)

Government
  - Body: Government of West Bengal
  - Governor: R. N. Ravi
  - Chief Minister: Suvendu Adhikari (BJP)

Area
  - Total: 88,752 km^{2} (34,267 sq mi)
  - Rank: 13th

Dimensions
  - Length: 320 km (200 mi)
  - Width: 623 km (387 mi)
- Highest elevation (Sandakphu): 3,636 m (11,929 ft)
- Lowest elevation (Bay of Bengal): 0 m (0 ft)

Population (2026 est.)
  - Total: ▲ ~100.6 million
  - Rank: 4th
  - Density: 1,194/km^{2} (3,090/sq mi)
  - Urban: 31.87%
  - Rural: 68.13%
- Demonym: Bengali

Language
  - Official: Bengali • English
  - Additional official: Nepali • Urdu • Hindi • Odia • Santali • Punjabi • Kamtapuri • Rajbanshi • Kurmali • Kurukh • Telugu
  - Official script: Bengali–Assamese script

GDP
  - Total (2026-27 FY): ▲₹21.48 lakh crore (US$230 billion) (nominal) ▲ ~US$1.05 trillion (PPP)
  - Rank: 6th
  - Per capita: ▲~₹198,451 (US$2,100) (2025-26) ▲~US$9,790 (PPP) (24th)
- Time zone: UTC+05:30 (IST)
- ISO 3166 code: IN-WB
- Vehicle registration: WB
- HDI (2022): ▲0.635 Medium (27th)
- Literacy (2024): 82.6% (25th)
- Sex ratio (2011): 950♀/1000 ♂ (8th)
- Website: wb.gov.in
- Symbols of West Bengal
- Bird: White-throated kingfisher
- Fish: Ilish
- Flower: Night-flowering jasmine
- Fruit: Mango
- Mammal: Fishing cat
- Tree: Chhaatim tree
- State highway mark
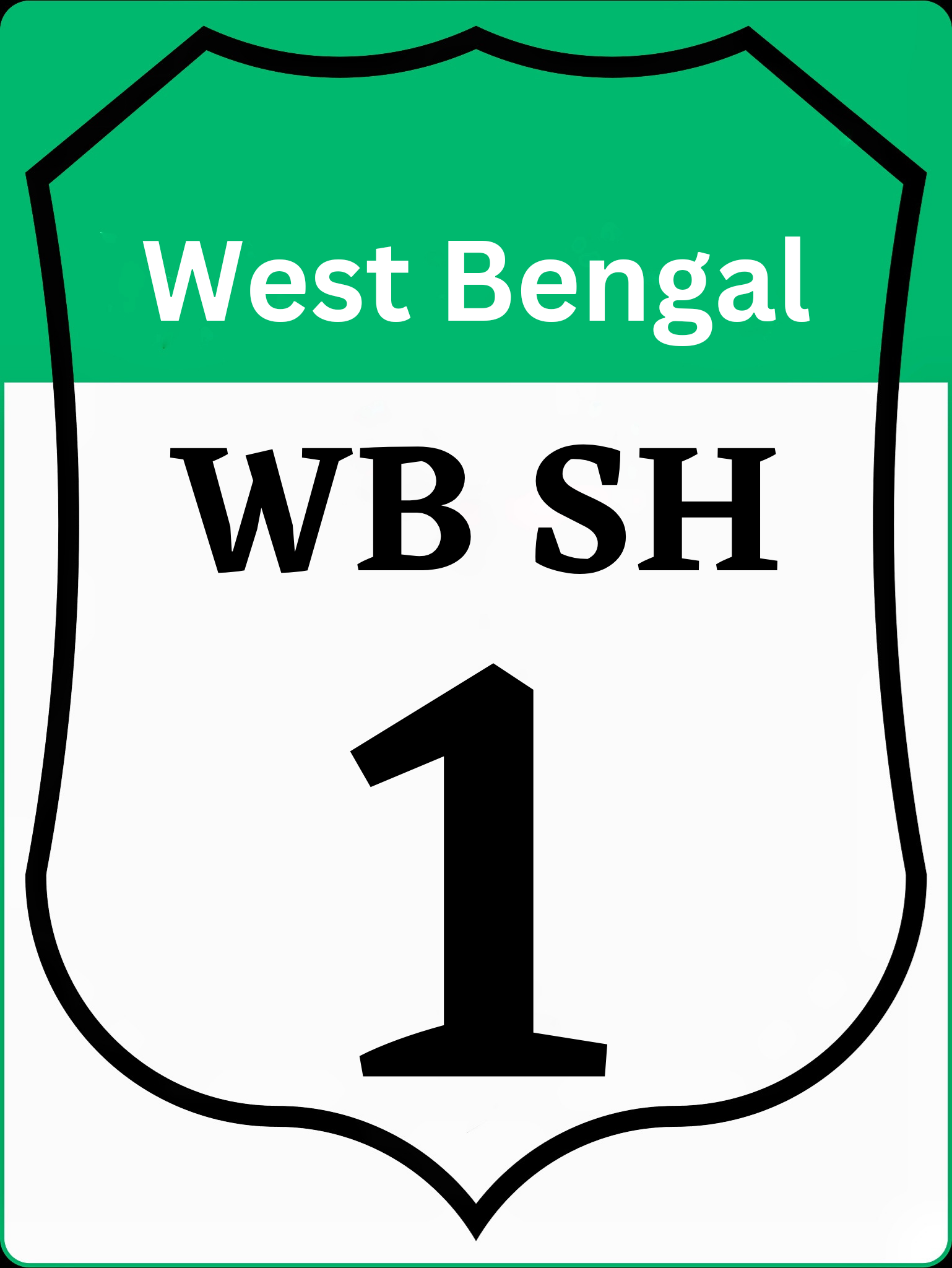
- State highway of West Bengal; WB SH1 – WB SH15
- List of Indian state symbols
- The Province of Bengal was split into two states i.e. West Bengal and East Bengal (present-day Bangladesh) by the Indian Independence Act 1947^{††} Partition of Bengal (1947)

West Bengal (Note: /bɛnˈɡɔːl/; Bengali: Pôścimbôṅgô, pronounced [ˈpoʃtʃimˈbɔŋɡo], abbr. WB) is a state in the eastern part of India. It is situated along the Bay of Bengal. In 2011, its population was around 91 million in an area of 88,752 km^{2} (34,267 sq mi), while the population estimate as of 2026 is 100.6 million. West Bengal is the fourth-most populous and thirteenth-largest state by area in India, as well as the eighth-most populous country subdivision of the world. As a part of the Bengal region of the Indian subcontinent, it borders Bangladesh in the east, and Nepal and Bhutan in the north. It also borders the Indian states of Jharkhand, Odisha, Bihar, Sikkim and Assam. The state capital is Kolkata, the third-largest metropolis, and seventh largest city by population in India. West Bengal includes the Darjeeling Himalayan hill region, the Ganges delta, the Rarh region, the coastal Sundarbans and the Bay of Bengal. The state's main ethnic group are the Bengalis.

The area's early history featured a succession of Indian empires, internal conflict, and a struggle between Hinduism and Buddhism for dominance. Ancient Bengal was the site of several major Janapadas, while the earliest cities date back to the Vedic period. The region was part of several ancient pan−Indian empires, including the Vangas, Mauryans, and the Guptas. The citadel of Gauḍa served as the capital of the Gauda kingdom, the Pala Empire, and the Sena Empire. Islam was introduced through trade with the Abbasid Caliphate, but following the Ghurid conquests led by Bakhtiyar Khalji and the establishment of the Delhi Sultanate, the Muslim faith spread across the entire Bengal region. During the Bengal Sultanate, the territory was a major trading nation in the world, and was often referred by the Europeans as the "richest country to trade with". It was absorbed into the Mughal Empire in 1576. Simultaneously, some parts of the region were ruled by several Hindu states, and Baro-Bhuyan landlords, and part of it was briefly overrun by the Suri Empire. Following the death of Emperor Aurangzeb in the early 1700s, the proto-industrialised Mughal Bengal became a semi-independent state under the Nawabs of Bengal, and therefore showed signs of the first Industrial Revolution. The region was later annexed into the Bengal Presidency by the British East India Company after the Battle of Buxar in 1764. From 1772 to 1911, Calcutta was the capital of all of East India Company's territories and then the capital of the entirety of India after the establishment of the Viceroyalty. From 1912 to India's Independence in 1947, it was the capital of the Bengal Province.

The region was a hotbed of the Indian independence movement and has remained one of India's great artistic and intellectual centres. Following widespread religious violence, the Bengal Legislative Council and the Bengal Legislative Assembly voted on the Partition of Bengal in 1947 along religious lines into two independent dominions: West Bengal, a Hindu-majority Indian state, and East Bengal, a Muslim-majority province of Pakistan which later became the independent Bangladesh. The state was also flooded with Hindu refugees from East Bengal (present-day Bangladesh) in the decades following the 1947 partition of India, transforming its landscape and shaping its politics. The early and prolonged exposure to British administration resulted in an expansion of Western education, culminating in developments in science, institutional education, and social reforms in the region, including what became known as the Bengali Renaissance. Several regional and pan−Indian empires throughout Bengal's history have shaped its culture, cuisine, and architecture.

Post-Indian independence, as a welfare state, West Bengal's economy is based on agricultural production and small and medium-sized enterprises. The state's cultural heritage, besides varied folk traditions, ranges from stalwarts in literature including Nobel-laureate Rabindranath Tagore to scores of musicians, film-makers and artists. For several decades, the state underwent political violence and economic stagnation after the beginning of communist rule in 1977 before it rebounded. In 2023–24, the economy of West Bengal is the sixth-largest state economy in India with a gross state domestic product (GSDP) of ₹17.19 lakh crore (US$180 billion), and has the country's 20th-highest GSDP per capita of ₹121,267 (US$1,300) as of 2020–21. Despite being one of the fastest-growing major economies, West Bengal has struggled to attract foreign direct investment due to adverse land acquisition policies, poor infrastructure, and red tape. It also has the 26th-highest ranking among Indian states in human development index, with the index value being lower than the Indian average. The state government debt of ₹6.47 lakh crore (US$69 billion), or 37.67% of GSDP, has dropped from 40.65% since 2010–11. West Bengal has three World Heritage sites and ranks as the eighth-most visited tourist destination in India and third-most visited state of India globally.

== Etymology ==
The origin of the name Bengal (Bangla and Bongo in Bengali) is unknown. One theory suggests the word derives from "Bang", the name of a Dravidian tribe that settled the region around 1000 BCE. The Bengali word Bongo might have been derived from the ancient kingdom of Vanga (or Banga). Although some early Sanskrit literature mentions the name Vanga, the region's early history is obscure.

In 1947, at the end of British rule over the Indian subcontinent, the Bengal Legislative Council and the Bengal Legislative Assembly voted on the Partition of Bengal along religious lines into two separate entities–West Bengal, which continued as an Indian state and East Bengal, a province of Pakistan, which came to be known be as East Pakistan and later became the independent Bangladesh.

In 2011, the Government of West Bengal proposed a change in the official name of the state to Paschim Banga (Bengali: পশ্চিমবঙ্গ Pôshchimbônggô). This is the native name of the state, literally meaning "West Bengal" in Bengali. Later on August 2016, the West Bengal Legislative Assembly passed another resolution to change the name of West Bengal to "Bengal" in English and "Bangla" in Bengali. Despite the Trinamool Congress government's efforts to forge a consensus on the name change resolution, the Indian National Congress, the Left Front and the Bharatiya Janata Party opposed the resolution. However, the central government has turned down the proposal maintaining the state should have one single name for all languages instead of three and it should not be the same as that of any other territory (pointing out that the name 'Bangla' may create confusion with neighbouring Bangladesh).

== History ==
=== Ancient and classical period ===
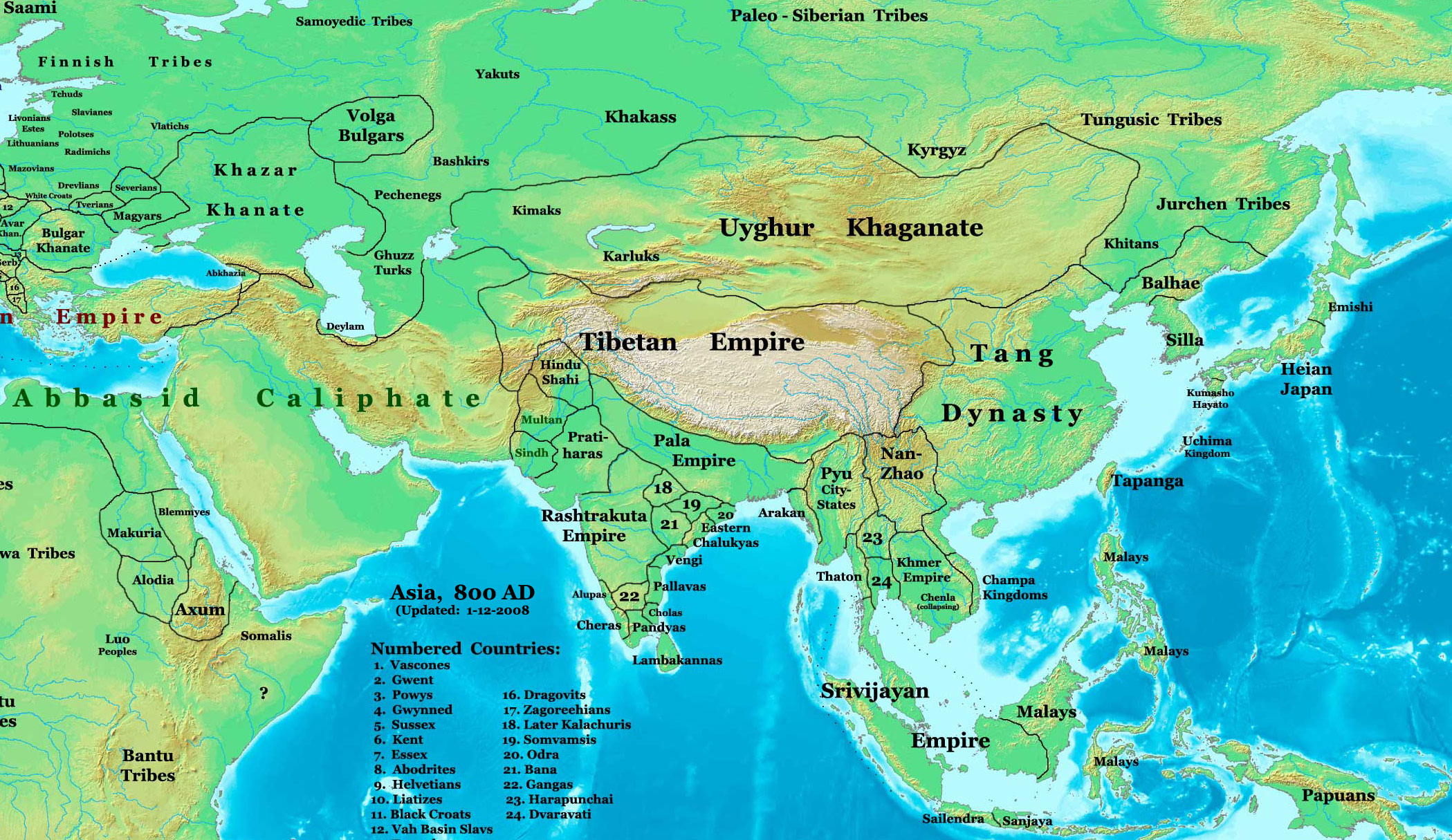
The Pala Empire was an imperial power during the Late Classical period on the Indian subcontinent, which originated in the region of Bengal.

Stone Age tools dating back 20,000 years have been excavated in the state, showing human occupation 8,000 years earlier than scholars had thought. According to the Indian epic Mahabharata, the region was part of the Vanga kingdom. Several Vedic realms were present in the Bengal region, including Vanga, Rarh, Pundravardhana and the Suhma kingdom. One of the earliest foreign references to Bengal is a mention by the Ancient Greeks around 100 BCE of a land named Gangaridai located at the mouths of the Ganges. Bengal had overseas trade relations with Suvarnabhumi (Burma, Lower Thailand, the Lower Malay Peninsula and Sumatra). According to the Sri Lankan chronicle Mahavamsa, Prince Vijaya (c. 543 – c. 505 BCE), a Vanga kingdom prince, conquered Lanka (modern-day Sri Lanka) and named the country Sinhala kingdom.

The kingdom of Magadha was formed in the 7th century BCE, consisting of the regions now comprising Bihar and Bengal. It was one of the four main kingdoms of India at the time during the lives of Mahavira, the principal figure of Jainism and Gautama Buddha, founder of Buddhism. It consisted of several janapadas, or kingdoms. Under Ashoka, the Maurya Empire of Magadha in the 3rd century BCE extended over nearly all of South Asia, including Afghanistan and parts of Balochistan. From the 3rd to the 6th centuries CE, the kingdom of Magadha served as the seat of the Gupta Empire.

Two kingdoms—Vanga or Samatata, and Gauda—are said in some texts to have appeared after the end of the Gupta Empire although details of their ascendancy are uncertain. The first recorded independent king of Bengal was Shashanka, who reigned in the early 7th century. Shashanka is often recorded in Buddhist annals as an intolerant Hindu ruler noted for his persecution of the Buddhists. He murdered Rajyavardhana, the Buddhist king of Thanesar, and is noted for destroying the Bodhi tree at Bodh Gaya, and replacing Buddha statues with Shiva lingams. After a period of anarchy, the Pala dynasty ruled the region for four-hundred years which began in the 8th century. For a brief period, Rajendra Chola I of the Chola dynasty invaded some areas of Bengal between 1021 and 1023. A shorter reign of the Hindu Sena dynasty followed.

Islam was introduced in Bengal through trade with the Abbasid Caliphate. In the late-12th century, following the Ghurid conquests led by Muhammad bin Bakhtiyar Khalji and the establishment of the Delhi Sultanate, it spread across the entire Bengal region. Mosques, madrasas and khanqahs were built throughout these stages. During the Islamic Bengal Sultanate, founded in 1352, Bengal was a major trading nation in the world and was often referred by the Europeans as the richest country to trade with. Later, in 1576, it was absorbed into the Mughal Empire.

=== Medieval and early modern periods ===
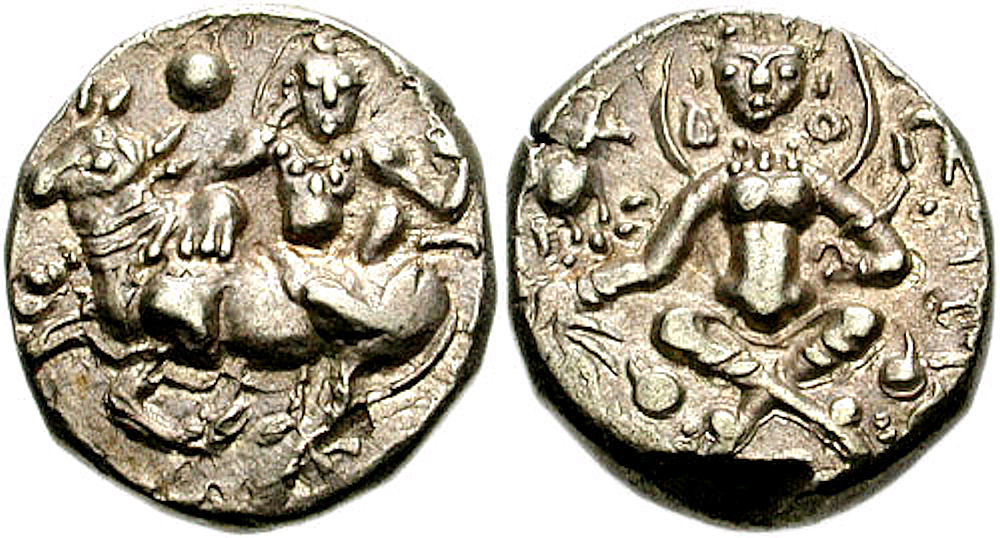
Coin of the King Shashanka, who created the first separate political entity in Bengal, called the Gauda kingdom

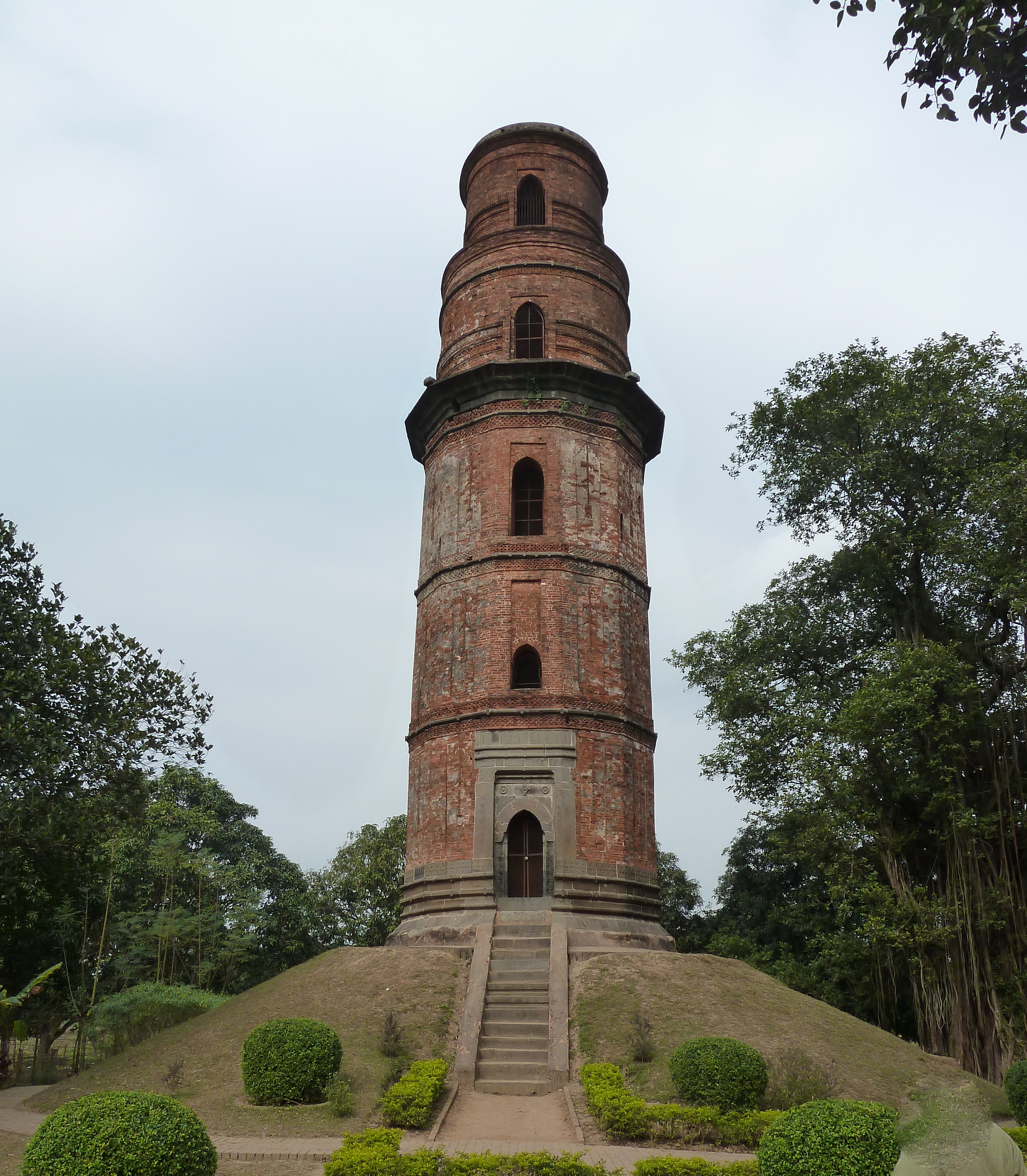
Firoz Minar at Gauḍa was built during the Bengal Sultanate.

Subsequent Muslim conquests further helped Islam to spread throughout the region. It was ruled by dynasties of the Bengal Sultanate and feudal lords under the Delhi Sultanate for the next few hundred years. The Bengal Sultanate was interrupted for twenty years by a Hindu uprising under Raja Ganesha. In the late-15th century, several European traders arrived to Bengal. In the 16th century, Mughal general Islam Khan conquered Bengal. Administration by governors appointed by the court of the Mughal Empire gave way to semi-independence under the Nawabs of Murshidabad, who nominally respected the sovereignty of the Mughals in Delhi. Several independent Hindu states were established in Bengal during the Mughal period, including those of Pratapaditya of Jessore District and Raja Sitaram Ray of Bardhaman. Following the death of Emperor Aurangzeb and the Governor of Bengal, Shaista Khan, the proto-industrialised Mughal Bengal became a semi-independent state under the Nawabs of Bengal, and showed signs of the world's first Industrial Revolution. The Koch dynasty in northern Bengal flourished during the 16th and 17th centuries; it weathered the Mughals and survived until the advent of the British colonial era.

=== Colonial period ===
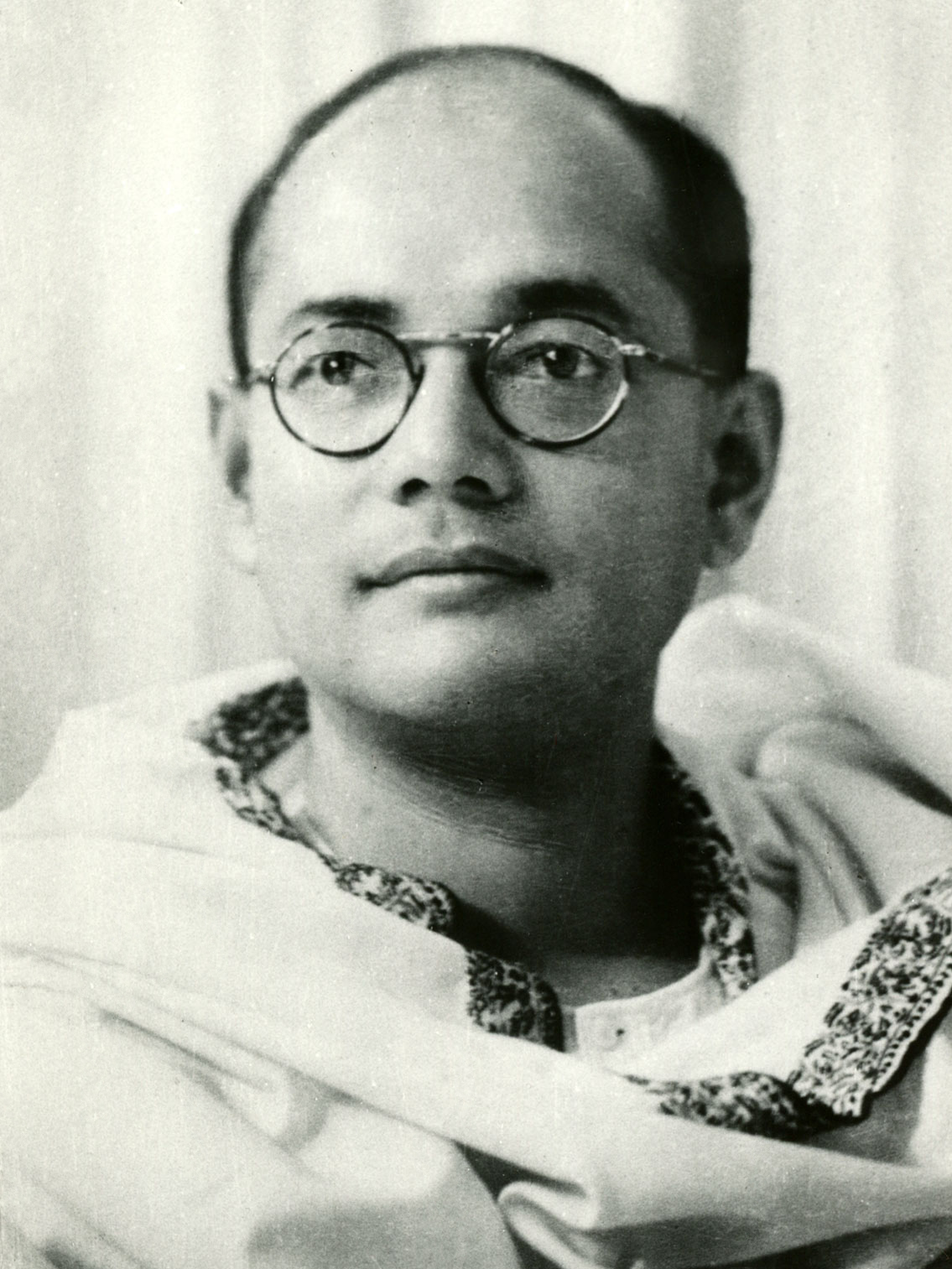
Subhas Chandra Bose, a leading freedom fighter of India

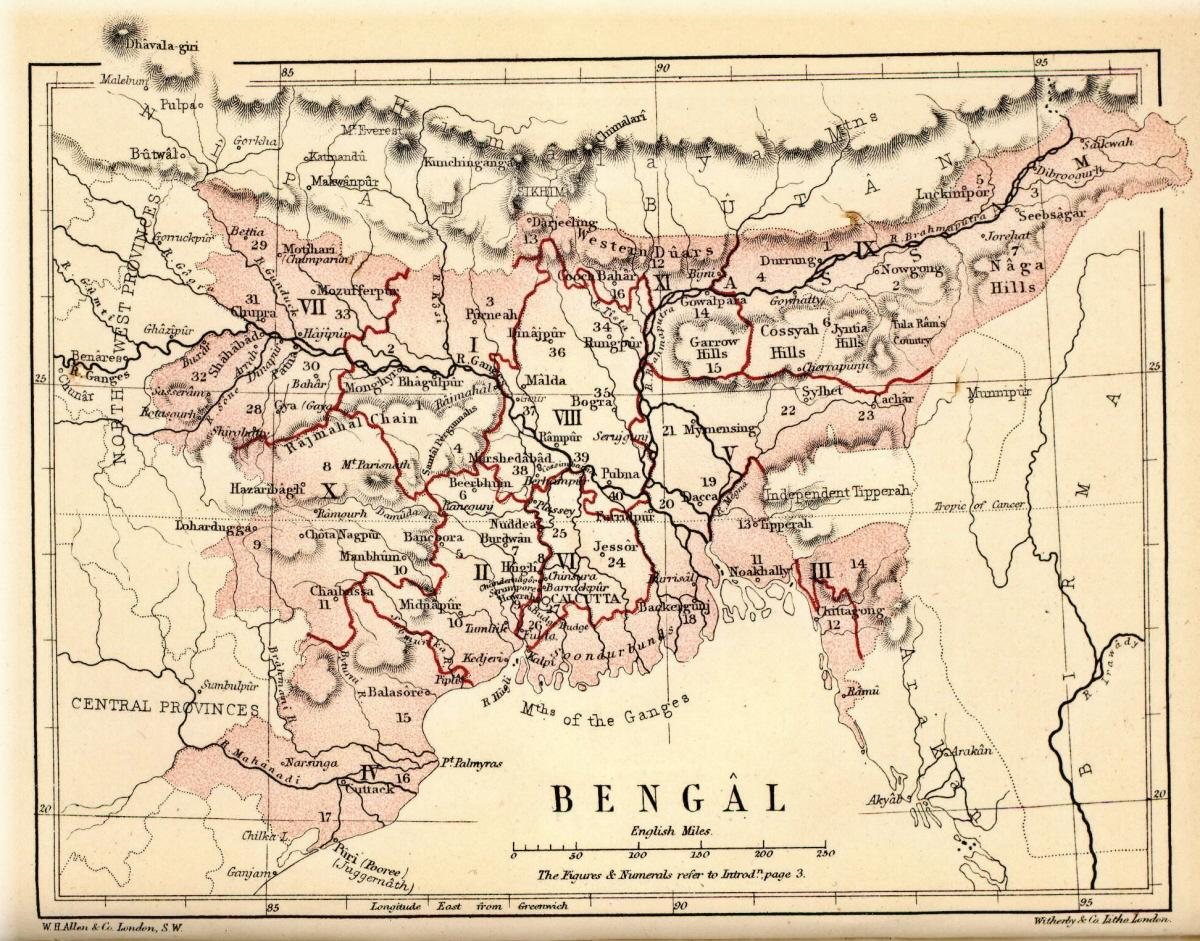
An 1880 map of Bengal

The British East India Company defeated Siraj ud-Daulah, the last independent Nawab, in the Battle of Plassey in 1757. The company gained the right to collect revenue in Bengal subah (province) in 1765 with the signing of the treaty between the East India company and the Mughal emperor following the Battle of Buxar in 1764. The Bengal Presidency was established in 1765; it later incorporated all British-controlled territory north of the Central Provinces (now Madhya Pradesh), from the mouths of the Ganges and the Brahmaputra to the Himalayas and the Punjab. The Bengal famine of 1770 claimed millions of lives due to tax policies enacted by the British company. Calcutta, the headquarters of the East India company, was named the capital of British-held territories in India in 1773. The failed Indian rebellion of 1857 originated nearby Calcutta, and resulted in a transfer of authority to the British Crown, which was administered by the Viceroy of India.

The Bengal Renaissance and the Brahmo Samaj socio-cultural reform movements significantly influenced the cultural and economic life of Bengal. Between 1905 and 1911 an abortive attempt was made to partition the province of Bengal into two zones. Years later, Bengal then suffered from the Great Bengal famine in 1943, which claimed three million lives during World War II. Bengalis played a major role in the Indian independence movement, in which revolutionary groups such as Anushilan Samiti and Jugantar were dominant. In October 1943, armed attempts against the British Raj from Bengal reached a climax when news of Subhas Chandra Bose leading the Indian National Army (INA) against the British reached Bengal. The Indian National Army was subsequently routed by the British.

=== Indian independence and afterwards ===
When India gained independence in 1947, Bengal was partitioned along religious lines. Both West and East Bengal experienced large influxes of refugees during and after the partition. The western part went to the Dominion of India and was named West Bengal. The eastern part went to the Dominion of Pakistan as a province called East Bengal (later renamed to East Pakistan in 1956), that became the independent nation of Bangladesh in 1971. In 1950, the Princely State of Cooch Behar was merged with West Bengal. Later in 1955, the former French enclave of Chandannagar, which had passed into Indian control after 1950, was integrated into West Bengal. Few portions of Bihar were also subsequently merged with West Bengal. Issues such as refugee resettlement continued to play a significant role in the politics and socio-economic condition of the state.

During the 1970s and 1980s, severe power shortages, strikes and a violent Marxist–Maoist movement by groups known as the Naxalites damaged much of the infrastructure, leading to a period of economic stagnation and deindustrialisation in the state. The Bangladesh Liberation War of 1971 resulted in an influx of millions of refugees to West Bengal, causing a further significant strain on its infrastructure. The 1974 smallpox epidemic killed thousands. West Bengal politics underwent a major change when the Left Front (LF) won the 1977 assembly election, defeating the incumbent Indian National Congress. The Left Front, led by the Communist Party of India (Marxist), governed the state next for more than three decades. In 1979, refugee settlers of post-Bangladesh Liberation War faced waves of forced eviction in a police confrontation in Marichjhanpi.

In the 1990s while registering an above-average growth in its economy post-India's economic liberalisation, West Bengal experienced a sharp decline in the public sector and grew gradually in the private sector. Due to the reducing state support for marginalized farmers and other Indian states attracting large private industries from the state, West Bengal's economy had shifted drastically to small industries and small enterprises in the 90s and the next decade. Beginning in the mid-2000s, armed insurgents conducted minor terrorist attacks in some parts of the state. In 2006, the state's healthcare system was severely criticised in the aftermath of the West Bengal blood test kit scam in which several defective kits were sold and later seized. Clashes with the administration took place at several controversial locations over the issue of industrial land acquisition and the subsequent Nandigram violence. This became a decisive reason behind the defeat of the incumbent Left Front government in the 2011 assembly election. Although the economy was severely damaged during the years of unrest in the LF rule, the state has steadily managed to revive its economy in the 2010s. It has shown improvement regarding bandhs (strikes) and educational infrastructure. With an increase in regular employment in rural West Bengal and the unemployment rate averaging below all-India level, the issue of unemployment was well managed in the state, though the state suffers from substandard healthcare services, a lack of socio-economic development, poor infrastructure, unemployment (persistent) and civil violence.

Candle march held for the R. G. Kar victim on 4 September 2024

The state's progress in the 2010s to 2020s was marked by several controversies including but not limited to–the Saradha Group financial scandal (2013), the Narada Sting operation (2016), and the 2022 West Bengal School Service Commission recruitment scam. The government led by the All India Trinamool Congress (AITC) winning first in 2011 assembly elections and consecutively next in 2016 and 2021 assembly elections brought various schemes such as Swasthya Saathi (health scheme similar to Ayushman Bharat Yojana), Lakshmir Bhandar (financial welfare), school programmes such as Kanyashree Prakalpa and Sabooj Saathi (availing bicycles for schoolgoers), and Yuva Saathi (unemployed youth welfare). The 2024 Kolkata rape and murder led to widespread protests and increased concerns regarding women safety in the state. The 2026 assembly elections won by the Bharatiya Janta Party (BJP) were held amid major controversies namely the revision of electoral rolls and the deployment of Central Armed Police Forces. Under the incumbent BJP government, policies such as changes to the mid-day meal (later rolled back), slight grant reduction for the festival, Durga Puja, and razing of hawkers and shopkeepers' shops came into effect. Also, various student clashes in the state universities took place including the ones in Jadavpur University and Satyajit Ray Film and Television Institute.

== Geography ==
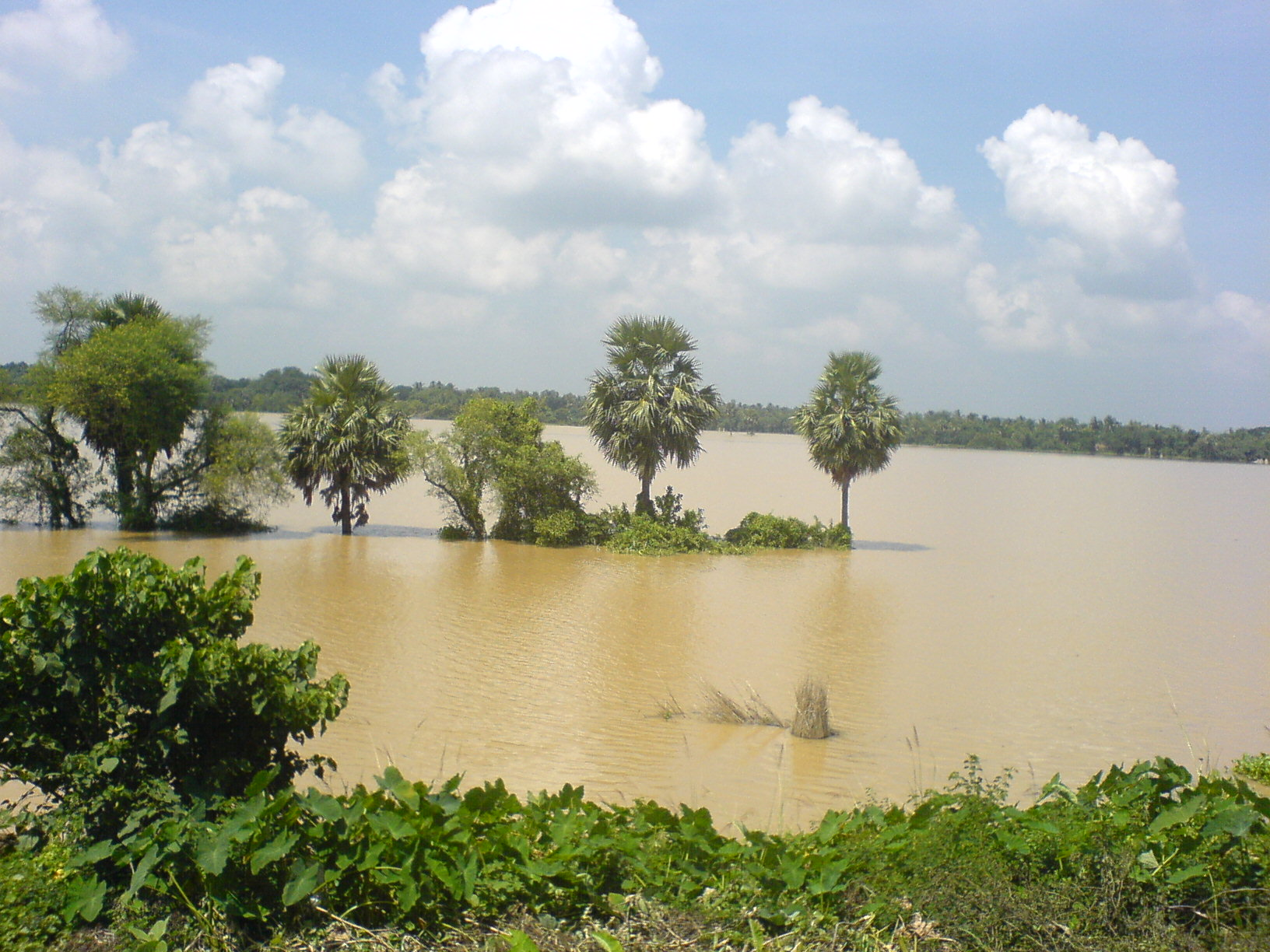
Many areas remain flooded during the heavy rains brought by monsoons.

West Bengal is on the eastern bottleneck of India, stretching from the Himalayas in the north to the Bay of Bengal in the south. The state has a total area of 88,752 square kilometres (34,267 sq mi). The Darjeeling Himalayan hill region in the northern extreme of the state is a part of the eastern Himalayas mountain range. In this region is Sandakphu, which, at 3,636 m (11,929 ft), is the highest peak of the state. The narrow Terai region separates the hills from the North Bengal plains, which in turn transitions into the Ganges delta towards the south. The Rarh region intervenes between the Ganges delta in the east and the Vajjabhumi (modern-day Birbhum district) in the west. A small coastal region is in the extreme south, while the Sundarbans mangrove forests form a geographical landmark at the Ganges delta.

The main river in West Bengal is the Ganges, which divides into two branches. One branch enters Bangladesh as the Padma, or Pôdda, while the other flows through West Bengal as the Bhagirathi River and Hooghly River. The Farakka barrage over the Ganges feeds the Hooghly branch of the river by a feeder canal. Its water flow management has been a source of lingering dispute between India and Bangladesh. The Teesta, Torsa, Jaldhaka and Mahananda rivers are in the northern hilly region. The western plateau region has rivers like the Damodar, Ajay and Kangsabati. The Ganges delta and the Sundarbans area have numerous rivers and creeks. Pollution of the Ganges from waste dumped indiscriminately into the river is a major problem. Damodar, a tributary of the Ganges and once known as the "Sorrow of Bengal" (due to its frequent floods), has several dams under the Damodar Valley Project. At least nine districts in the state suffer from arsenic contamination of groundwater, and as of 2017, an estimated 1.04 crore people were affected by arsenic poisoning.

West Bengal's climate varies from tropical savanna in the southern portions to humid subtropical in the north. The main weather seasons are summer, the rainy season, a short autumn and winter. While the summer in the delta region is noted for excessive humidity, the western highlands experience a dry summer like northern India. The highest daytime temperatures range from 38 to 45 °C (100 to 113 °F). At night, a cool southerly breeze carries moisture from the Bay of Bengal. In early summer, brief squalls and thunderstorms known as Kalbaisakhi, or Nor'westers, often occur. West Bengal receives the Bay of Bengal branch of the Indian Ocean monsoon that moves in a southeast to northwest direction. Monsoons bring rain to the whole state from June to September. Heavy rainfall of above 250 centimetres (98 in) is observed in the Darjeeling, Jalpaiguri, and Cooch Behar district. During the arrival of the monsoons, low pressure in the Bay of Bengal region often leads to the formation of storms in the coastal areas. Winter (December–January) is mild over the plains with average minimum temperatures of 15 °C (59 °F). A cold and dry northern wind blows in the winter, substantially lowering the humidity level. The Darjeeling Himalayan hill region experiences a harsh winter, with occasional snowfall.

=== Flora and fauna ===
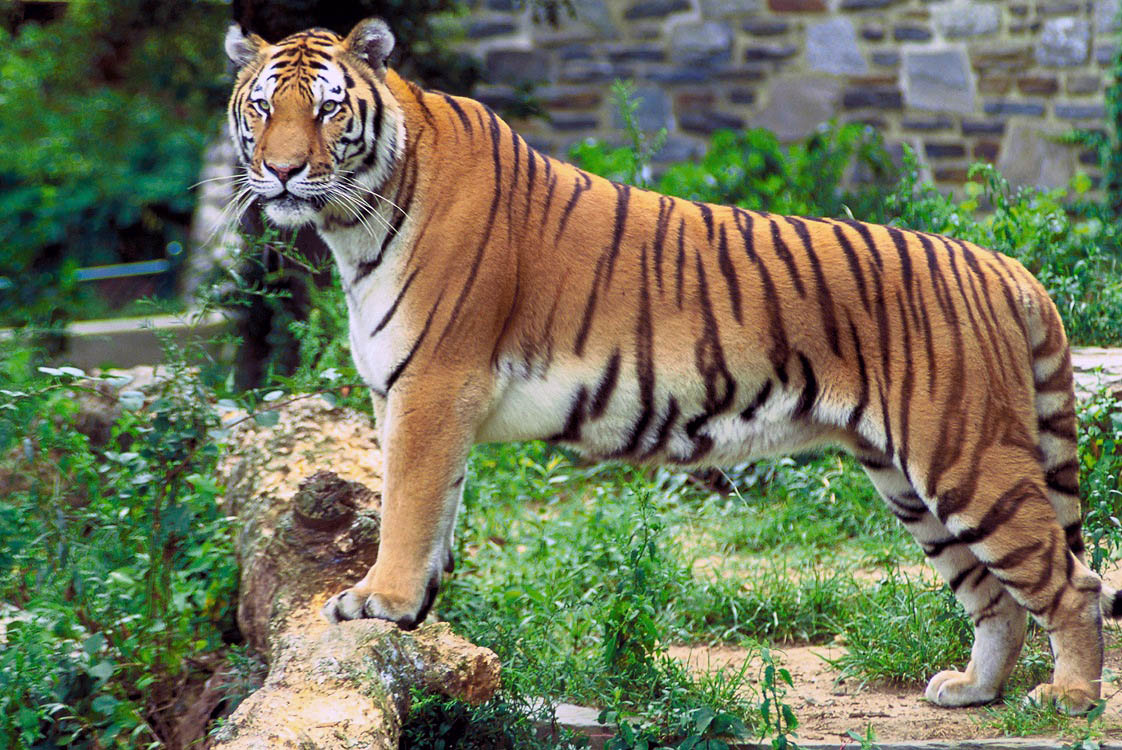
A Royal Bengal tiger

Mangrove trees including Heritiera fomes (sundari tree) seen in the Sundarbans, a UNESCO World Heritage Site

The "India State of Forest Report 2017", recorded forest area in the state as 16,847 km^{2} (6,505 sq mi), while in 2013, forest area was 16,805 km^{2} (6,488 sq mi), which was 18.93% of the state's geographical area, compared to the then national average of 21.23%. Reserves, protected and unclassed forests constitute 59.4%, 31.8% and 8.9%, respectively, of forested areas, as of 2009. Part of the world's largest mangrove forest, the Sundarbans in southern West Bengal.

From a phytogeographic viewpoint, the southern part of West Bengal can be divided into two regions: the Gangetic plain and the littoral mangrove forests of the Sundarbans. The alluvial soil of the Gangetic plain, combined with favourable rainfall, makes this region especially fertile. Much of the vegetation of the western part of the state has similar species composition with the plants of the Chota Nagpur plateau in the adjoining state of Jharkhand. The predominant commercial tree species is Shorea robusta, commonly known as the sal tree. The coastal region of Purba Medinipur exhibits coastal vegetation where the predominant tree is the Casuarina. A notable tree from the Sundarbans is the ubiquitous sundari (Heritiera fomes), from which the forest gets its name.

The distribution of vegetation in northern West Bengal is dictated by elevation and precipitation. For example, the foothills of the Himalayas, the Dooars, are densely wooded with sal and other tropical evergreen trees. Above an elevation of 1,000 metres (3,300 ft), the forest becomes predominantly subtropical. In Darjeeling, which is above 1,500 metres (4,900 ft), temperate forest trees like oaks, conifers and rhododendrons predominate.

3.26% of the geographical area of West Bengal is protected land, comprising fifteen wildlife sanctuaries and five national parks—Sundarbans National Park, Buxa Tiger Reserve, Gorumara National Park, Neora Valley National Park and Singalila National Park. Extant wildlife includes Indian rhinoceros, Indian elephant, deer, leopard, gaur, tiger and crocodiles, as well as many bird species. Migratory birds come to the state during the winter. The high-altitude forests of Singalila National Park shelter barking deer, red panda, chinkara, takin, serow, pangolin, minivet and kalij pheasants. The Sundarbans are noted for a reserve project devoted to conserving the endangered Bengal tiger, although the forest hosts many other endangered species such as the Gangetic dolphin, river terrapin and estuarine crocodile. The mangrove forest also acts as a natural fish nursery, supporting coastal fishes along the Bay of Bengal. Recognising its special conservation value, the Sundarbans area has been declared a biosphere reserve, a designated area for wildlife conservation.

== Demographics ==
Historical population
Year	Pop.	±%
1901	16,940,088	—
1911	17,998,769	+6.2%
1921	17,474,348	−2.9%
1931	18,897,036	+8.1%
1941	23,229,552	+22.9%
1951	26,299,980	+13.2%
1961	34,926,279	+32.8%
1971	44,312,011	+26.9%
1981	54,580,647	+23.2%
1991	68,077,965	+24.7%
2001	80,176,197	+17.8%
2011	91,276,115	+13.8%
Source: Census of India

Languages spoken by district Bengali 50–60% 60–70% 70–80% 80–90% 90–100% Nepali 30–40% 50–60%

According to the provisional results of the 2011 national census, West Bengal is the fourth-most-populous state in India with a population of 91,347,736 (representing 7.55% of India's population). The state's 2001–2011 decennial population growth rate was 13.93%, lower than the 1991–2001 growth rate of 17.8% and lower than the national rate of 17.64%. The gender ratio is 947 females per 1,000 males. As of 2011, West Bengal had a population density of 1,029 inhabitants per square kilometre (2,670/sq mi) making it the second-most densely populated state in India, after Bihar.

The literacy rate is 77.08%, higher than the national rate of 74.04%. Data from 2010 to 2014 showed the life expectancy in the state was 70.2 years, higher than the national value of 67.9. The proportion of people living below poverty line in 2013 was 19.98%, a decline from 31.8% a decade prior. Scheduled castes and tribes form 28.6% and 5.8% of the population, respectively, in rural areas and 19.9% and 1.5%, respectively, in urban areas.

A 2013 study conducted in three districts of West Bengal found that accessing private health services to treat illness had a disastrous impact on households. This indicates the importance of the public provision of health services to mitigate poverty and the impact of illness on poor households.

A 2014 Sample Registration System (SRS) statistical report showed that West Bengal has the lowest fertility rate among Indian states. West Bengal's total fertility rate (TFR) was 1.6, lower than neighbouring Bihar's 3.4, which is the highest in the entire country. Bengal's TFR of 1.6 roughly equals that of Canada.

In September 2017, West Bengal achieved 100% electrification, after some remote villages in the Sunderbans became the last to be electrified. Also, at the same time, of 125 urban towns and cities in Bengal, 76 have achieved open defecation free (ODF) status. All towns in the districts of: Nadia, North 24 Parganas, Hooghly, Bardhaman and East Medinipur are ODF zones, with Nadia becoming the first ODF district in the state.

Bengalis, consisting of Bengali Hindus, Bengali Muslims, Bengali Christians and a few Bengali Buddhists, comprise the majority of the population. Marwari, Maithili and Bhojpuri speakers are scattered throughout the state; various indigenous ethnic Buddhist communities such as the Sherpas, Bhutias, Lepchas, Tamangs, Yolmos and ethnic Tibetans can be found in the Darjeeling Himalayan hill region. Native Khortha speakers are found in Malda district.

Surjapuri, a language considered to be a mix of Maithili and Bengali, is spoken across northern parts of the state. The Darjeeling Hills are mainly inhabited by various Gorkha communities who overwhelmingly speak Nepali (also known as Gorkhali), although there are some who retain their ancestral languages like Lepcha. West Bengal is also home to indigenous tribal Adivasis such as: Santhal, Munda, Oraon, Bhumij, Lodha, Kol, and Toto.

There are a small number of ethnic minorities primarily in the state capital, including but not limited to Chinese, Tamils, Maharashtrians, Odias, Malayalis, Gujaratis, Anglo-Indians, Armenians, Jews, Punjabis and Parsis. India's sole Chinatown is in eastern Kolkata.

=== Languages ===
Languages of West Bengal (2011)
1. Bengali (86.2%)
2. Hindi (6.97%)
3. Santali (2.66%)
4. Urdu (1.82%)
5. Nepali (1.27%)
6. Others (1.06%)

The state's official languages are Bengali and English meanwhile Nepali has an additional official status in the three subdivisions of Darjeeling district. In 2012, the state government passed a bill granting additional official status to Hindi, Odia, Punjabi, Santali and Urdu in areas where speakers exceed 10% of the population. In 2019, another bill was passed by the government to include Kamtapuri, Kurmali and Rajbanshi as additional official languages in blocks, divisions or districts where the speakers exceed 10% of the population. On 24 December 2020, Chief Minister Mamata Banerjee announced Telugu as an additional official language. As of the 2011 census, 86.22% of the population spoke Bengali, 5.00% Hindi, 2.66% Santali, 1.82% Urdu and 1.26% Nepali as their first language.

=== Religion ===
Religion in West Bengal (2011)
1. Hinduism (70.5%)
2. Islam (27.0%)
3. Christianity (0.72%)
4. Buddhism (0.31%)
5. No religion (0.25%)
6. Jainism (0.07%)
7. Sikhism (0.07%)
8. Other Religions (inc. Tribal religions, Judaism and Zoroastrianism) (1.03%)

West Bengal is religiously diverse, with regional cultural and religious specificities. Although Hindus are the predominant community, the state has a large minority Muslim population. Christians, Buddhists and others form a minuscule part of the population. As of the 2011 census, Hinduism is the most common religion, with adherents representing 70.54% of the total state population. Islam, the second-most common religion, has 27.01% adherents of the total state population. Also, according to the 2011 census, the Hindu population of West Bengal is 64,385,546 while the Muslim population is 24,654,825. Three of West Bengal's districts: Murshidabad, Malda and Uttar Dinajpur, are Muslim-majority. Sikhism, Christianity, Buddhism and other religions make up the remainder. Buddhism remains a widely followed religion in the Himalayan region of the Darjeeling hills; almost the entirety of West Bengal's Buddhist population is from this region. Christianity is mainly found among the tea garden tribes at tea plantations scattered throughout the Dooars of Darjeeling, Jalpaiguri and Alipurduar districts.

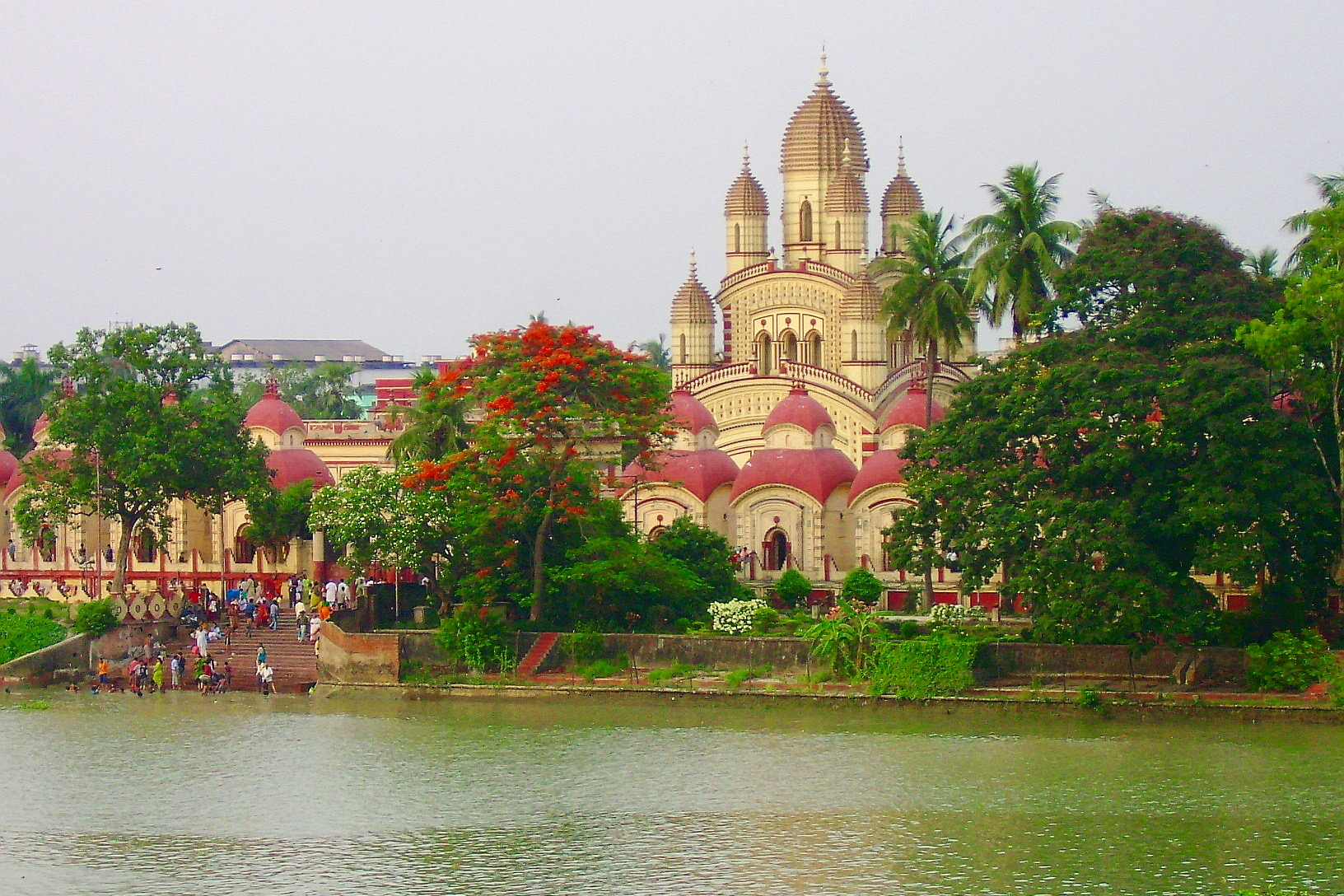
Dakshineswar Kali Temple

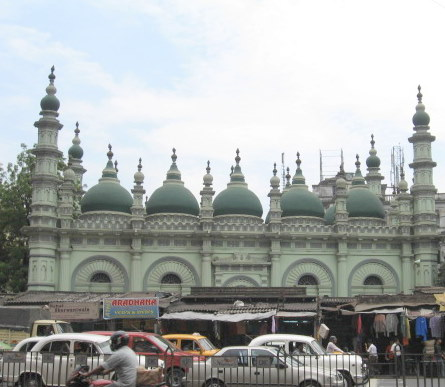
Tipu Sultan Mosque

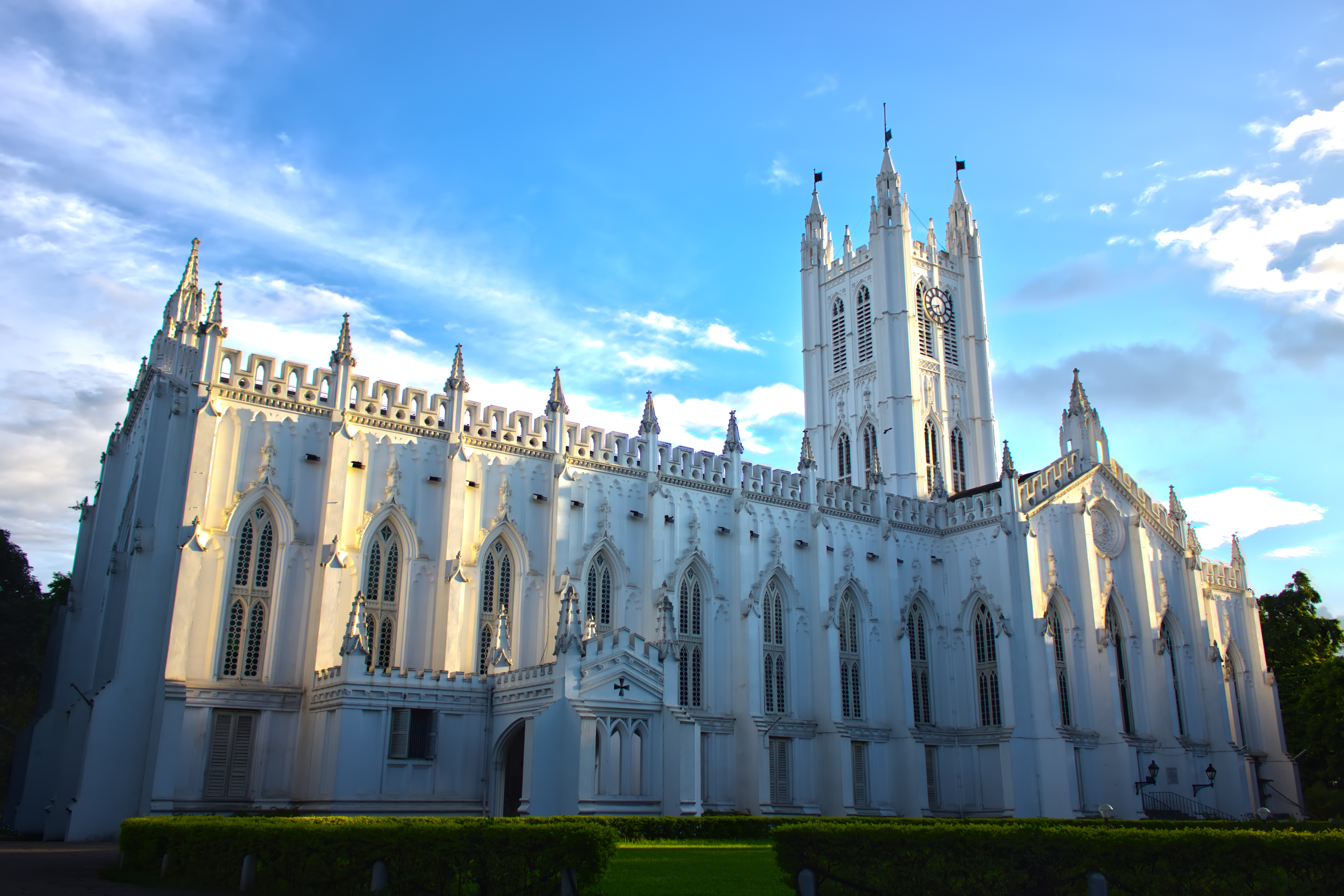
St Paul's Cathedral

== Government and politics ==
Main offices in West Bengal

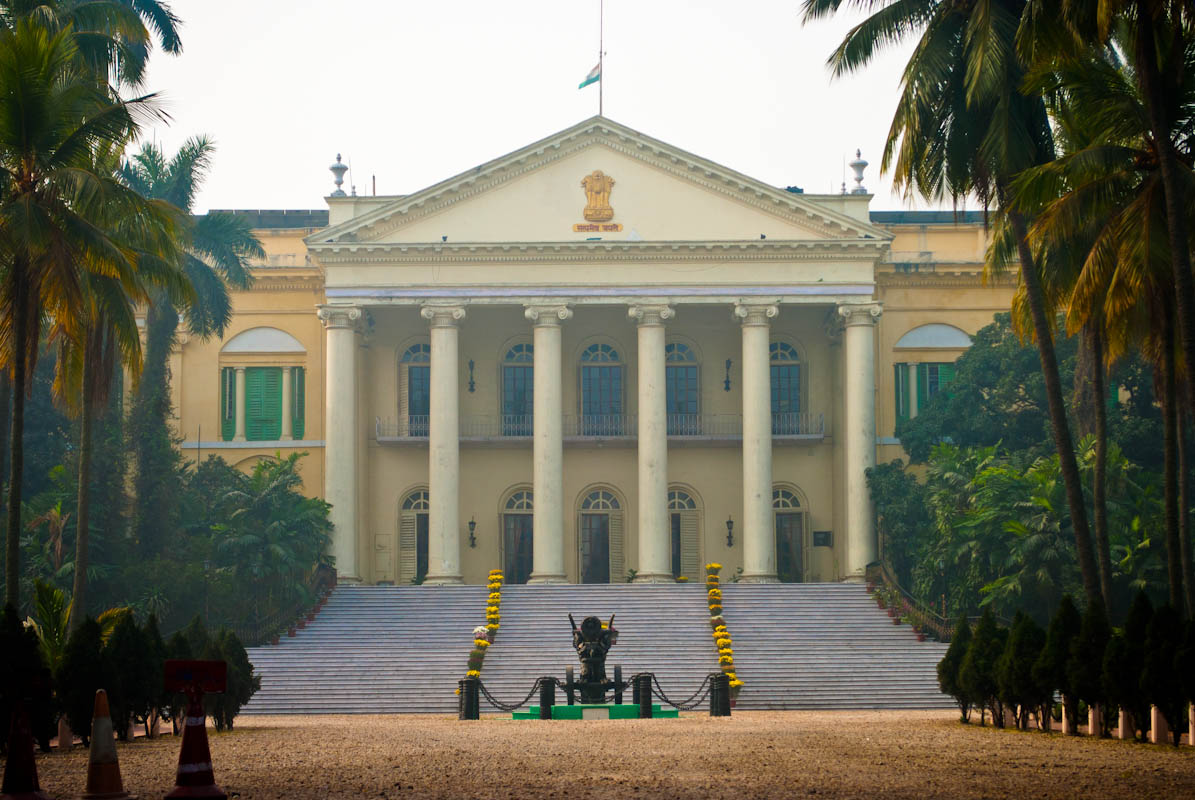
Raj Bhavan, the residence of the governor of the state

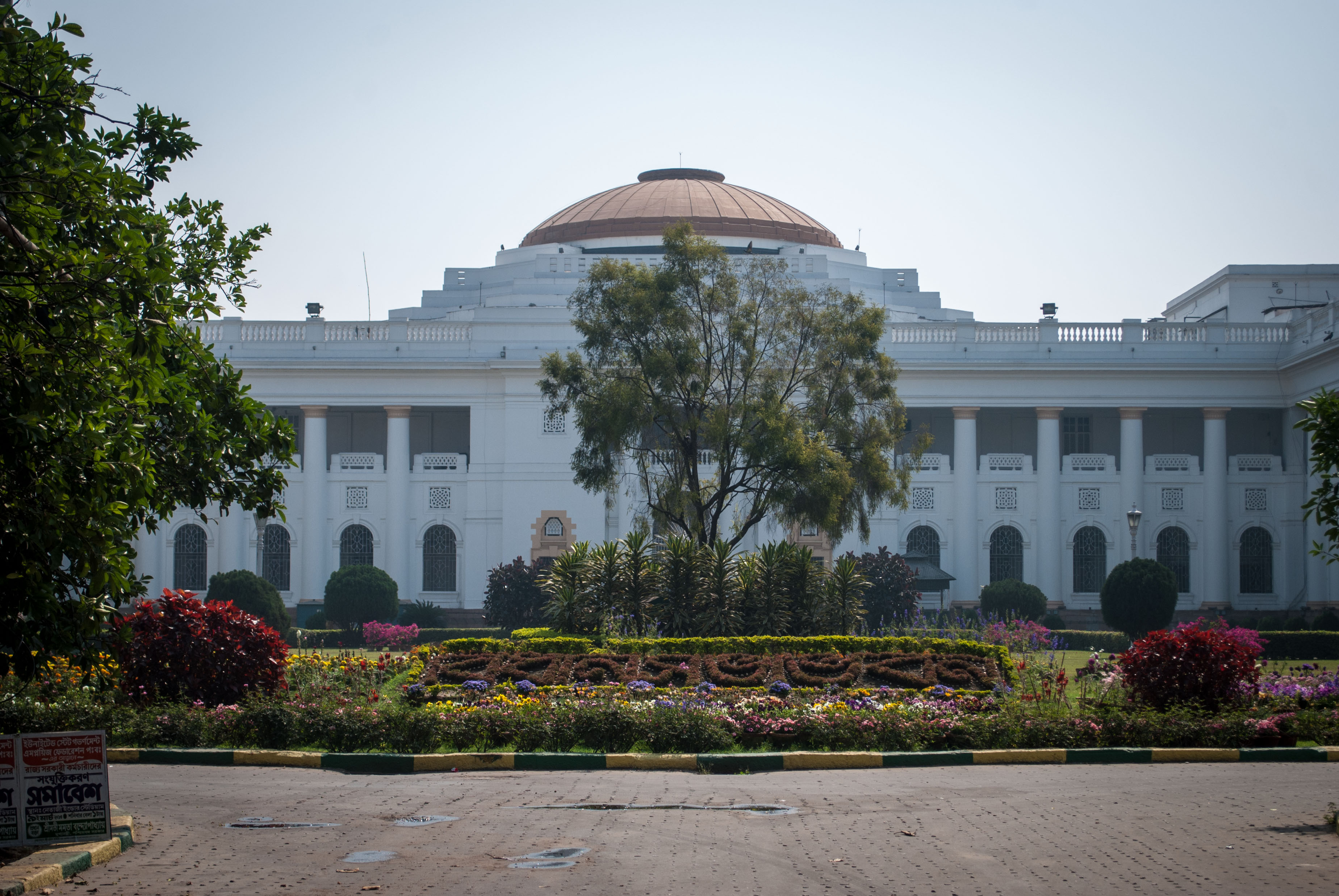
Vidhan Sabha Bhavan, meeting place of the West Bengal Legislative Assembly

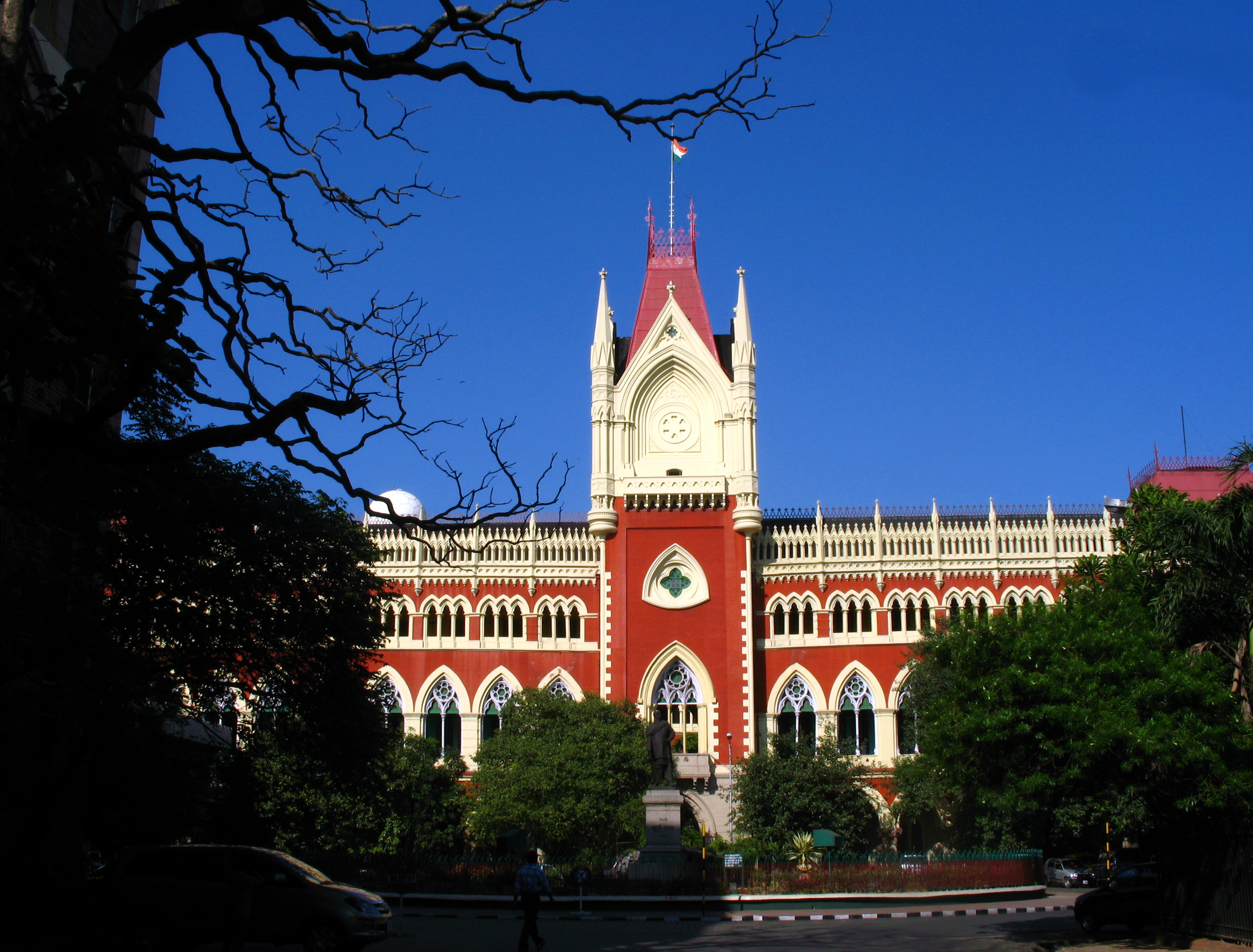
Calcutta High Court, highest court in West Bengal

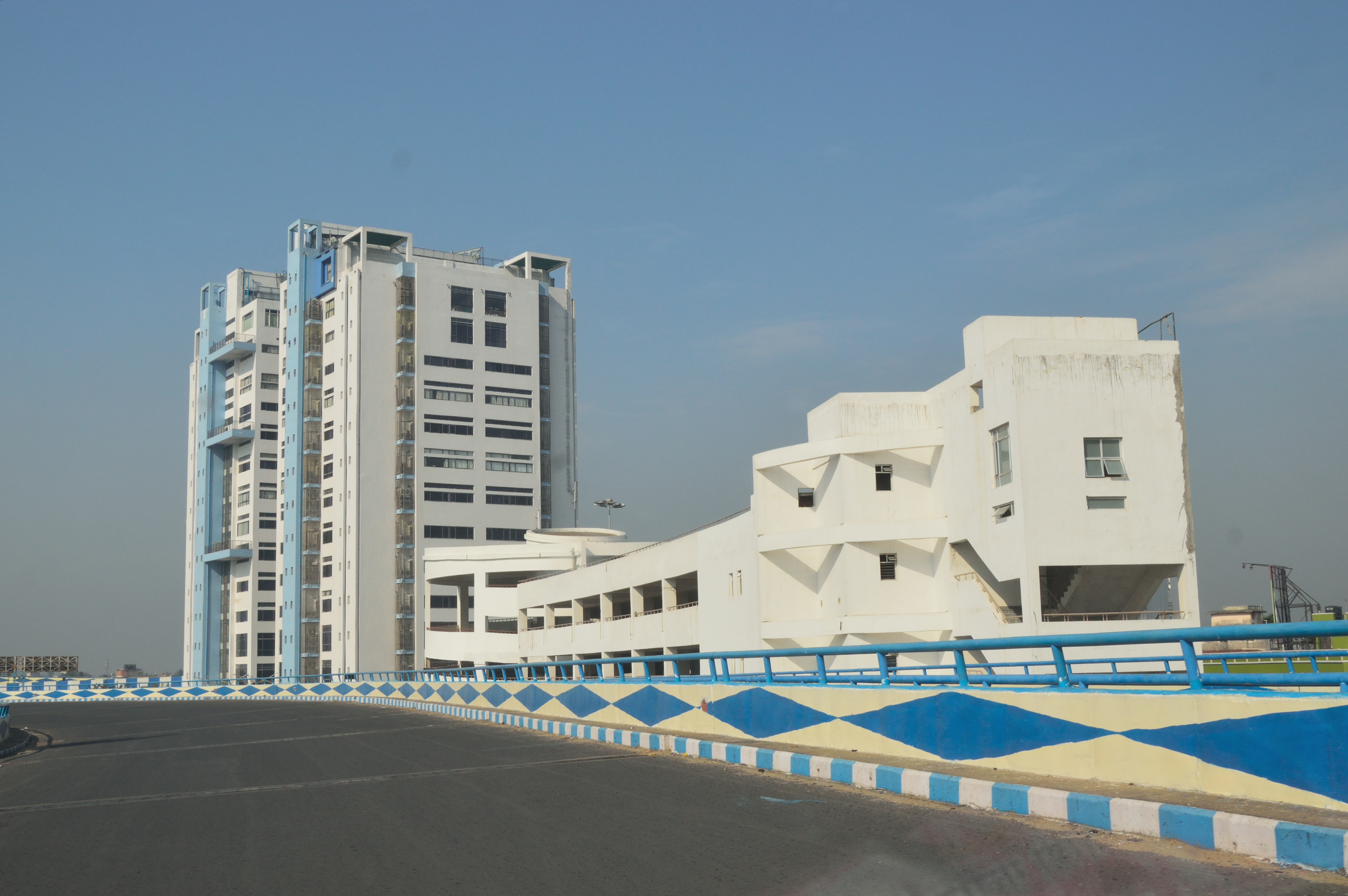
Nabanna, temporary office of the Chief Minister of West Bengal

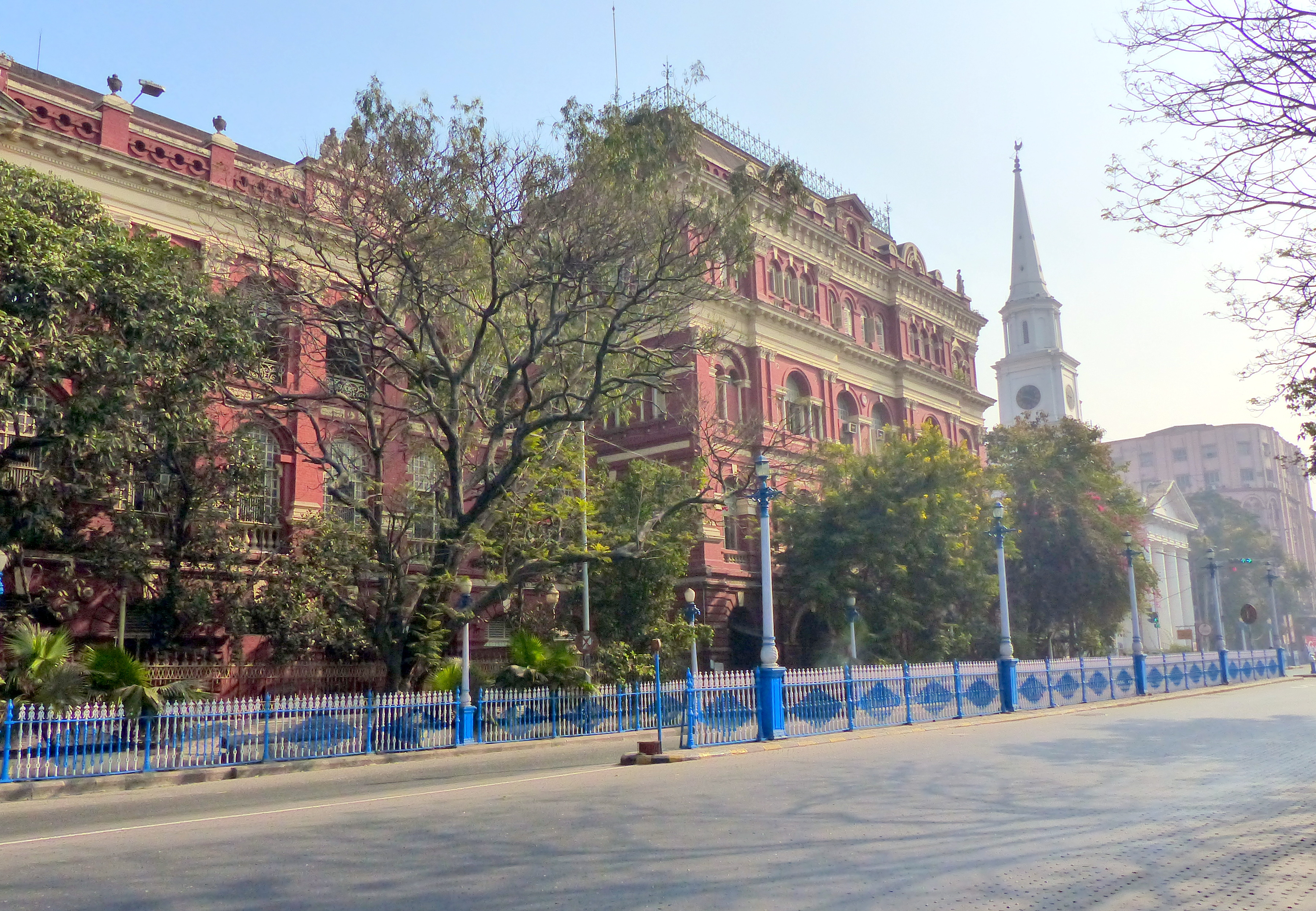
Writers' Building, West Bengal Government Secretariat

West Bengal is governed through a parliamentary system of representative democracy, a feature the state shares with other Indian states. There are three branches in the state's government namely legislature, executive and judiciary. Universal suffrage is granted to its residents. The West Bengal Legislative Assembly, consists of elected members and special office bearers such as the Speaker and Deputy Speaker, who are elected by the members. Assembly meetings are presided over by the speaker, or the deputy speaker in the speaker's absence. The state's judiciary is composed of the Calcutta High Court and a system of lower courts. Executive authority is vested in the Council of Ministers headed by the Chief Minister although the titular head of government is the Governor.

The governor is the head of the West Bengal government and is appointed by the President of India. The leader of the party or coalition with a majority in the Legislative Assembly is appointed as the chief minister by the governor. The Council of Ministers is appointed by the governor on the advice of the chief minister. The Council of Ministers reports to the Legislative Assembly. The assembly is unicameral with 295 members, or MLAs, including one nominated from the Anglo-Indian community. Terms of office run for five years unless the assembly is dissolved before the completion of the term. Auxiliary authorities known as panchayats, for which local body elections are regularly held, govern local affairs. The state contributes 42 seats to the Lok Sabha and 16 seats to the Rajya Sabha of the Indian Parliament.

Elections in West Bengal is contested by political parties such as the Trinamool Congress (TMC), Bharatiya Janata Party (BJP), Indian National Congress (INC), and the Left Front alliance (led by the Communist Party of India (Marxist) or CPI(M)).

West Bengal was governed by the Left Front for 34 years, from 1977 to 2011, making it the world's longest-running democratically elected communist government. Following the election in 2011, the Trinamool Congress and Indian National Congress coalition under Mamata Banerjee of the Trinamool Congress was elected to power with 225 seats in the legislature. Banerjee was re-elected twice as Chief Minister in the 2016 election and 2021 election with 211 and 215 seats respectively, an absolute majority by the Trinamool Congress. In the 2026 election, the Bharatiya Janata Party formed the government for the first time, winning 207 seats, with Suvendu Adhikari becoming the Chief Minister. The state has one autonomous region, the Gorkhaland Territorial Administration.

In August 2026, the West Bengal government approved the state's first-ever anti-terrorism squad and a new anti-narcotics task force.

=== Districts and cities ===
==== Districts ====
Districts of West Bengal

As of 1 November 2023, West Bengal is divided into 23 districts.

District	Population	Growth rate	Sex ratio	Literacy	Density per square Kilometer
North 24 Parganas	10,009,781	12.04	955	84.06	2445
South 24 Parganas	8,161,961	18.17	956	77.51	819
Purba Bardhaman	4,835,432	–	945	74.73	890
Paschim Bardhaman	2,882,031	–	922	78.75	1800
Murshidabad	7,103,807	21.09	958	66.59	1334
Paschim Medinipur	5,913,457	13.86	966	78.00	631
Hooghly	5,519,145	9.46	961	81.80	1753
Nadia	5,167,600	12.22	947	74.97	1316
Purba Medinipur	5,095,875	15.36	938	87.02	1081
Howrah	4,850,029	13.50	939	83.31	3306
Kolkata	4,496,694	−1.67	908	86.31	24306
Maldah	3,988,845	21.22	944	61.73	1069
Jalpaiguri	3,872,846	13.87	953	73.25	622
Alipurduar (Note: Was created after the 2011 Census)	1,700,000	–	–	–	400
Bankura	3,596,292	12.64	954	70.95	523
Birbhum	3,502,404	16.15	956	70.68	771
Uttar Dinajpur	3,007,134	23.15	939	59.07	958
Purulia	2,930,115	15.52	957	64.48	468
Cooch Behar	2,819,086	13.71	942	74.78	832
Darjeeling	1,846,823	14.77	970	79.56	586
Dakshin Dinajpur	1,676,276	11.52	956	72.82	755
Kalimpong	202,239	–	–	–	270
Jhargram	1,136,548	–	–	–	374

Each district is governed by a district collector or district magistrate, appointed by either the Indian Administrative Service (IAS) or the West Bengal Civil Service (WBCS). Each district is subdivided into sub-divisions, governed by a Sub-Divisional Magistrate, and again into blocks. Blocks consists of panchayats (village councils) and town municipalities.

==== Cities ====
The capital and largest city of the state is Kolkata—the third-largest urban agglomeration and the seventh-largest city in India. Asansol is the second-largest city and urban agglomeration in West Bengal.

Major planned cities of West Bengal include Bidhannagar, New Town, Kalyani, Haldia, Durgapur and Kharagpur. Kolkata has some planned neighbourhoods like New Garia, Tollygunge, and Lake Town. Siliguri is an economically important city, strategically located in the northeastern Siliguri Corridor (Chicken's Neck) of India. Other cities of significance in West Bengal include Barrackpore, Baharampur, Basirhat, Bardhaman, Howrah, Chandannagar, Jalpaiguri, Haldia and Purulia etc.

== Economy ==
Net State Domestic Product at Factor Cost at Current Prices (2004–05 Base) (figures in crores of Indian rupees)
Year	Net State Domestic Product
2004–2005	190,073
2005–2006	209,642
2006–2007	238,625
2007–2008	272,166
2008–2009	309,799
2009–2010	366,318

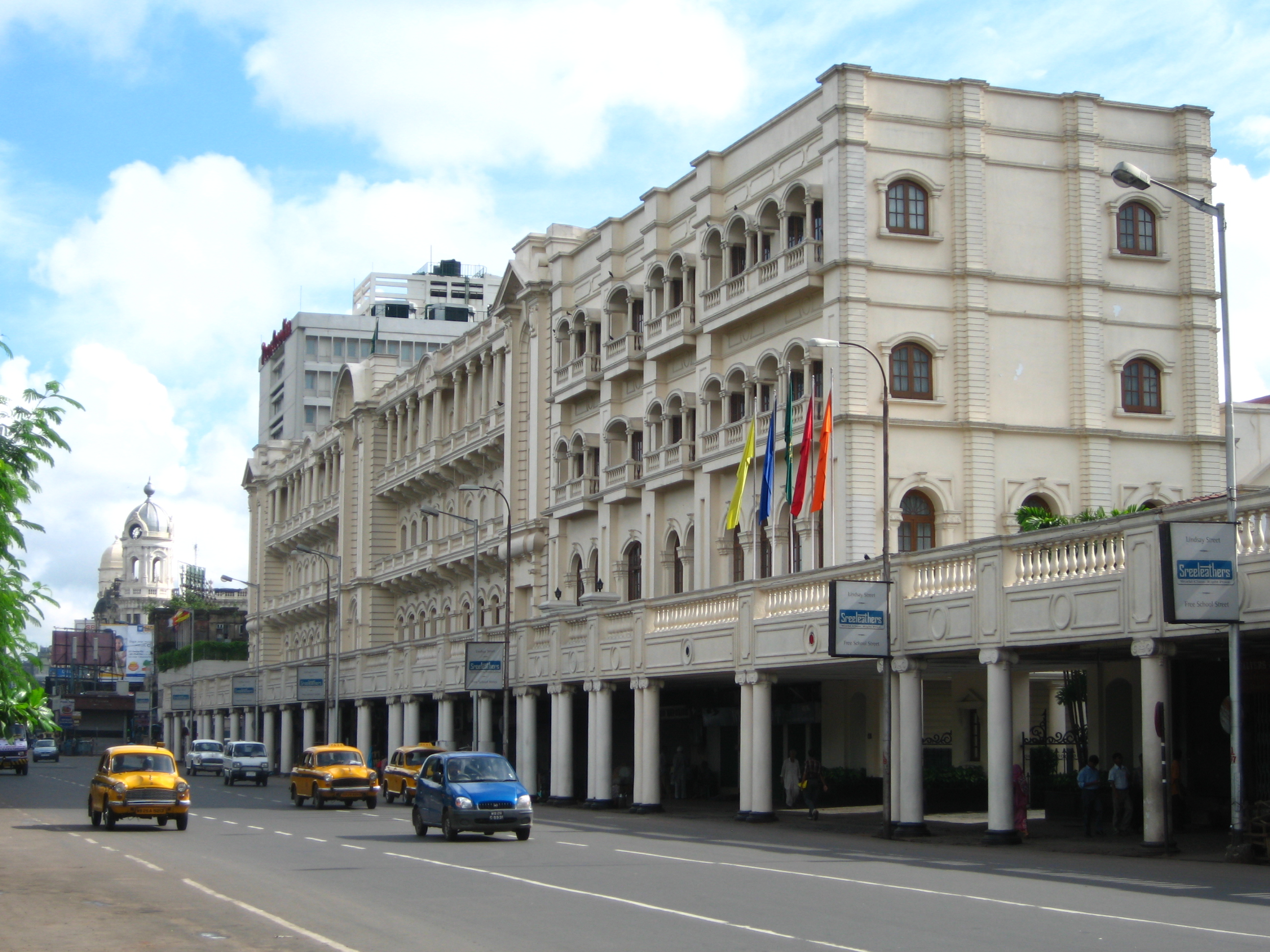
The Grand Hotel in Kolkata. Tourism, especially from Bangladesh, is an important part of West Bengal's economy.

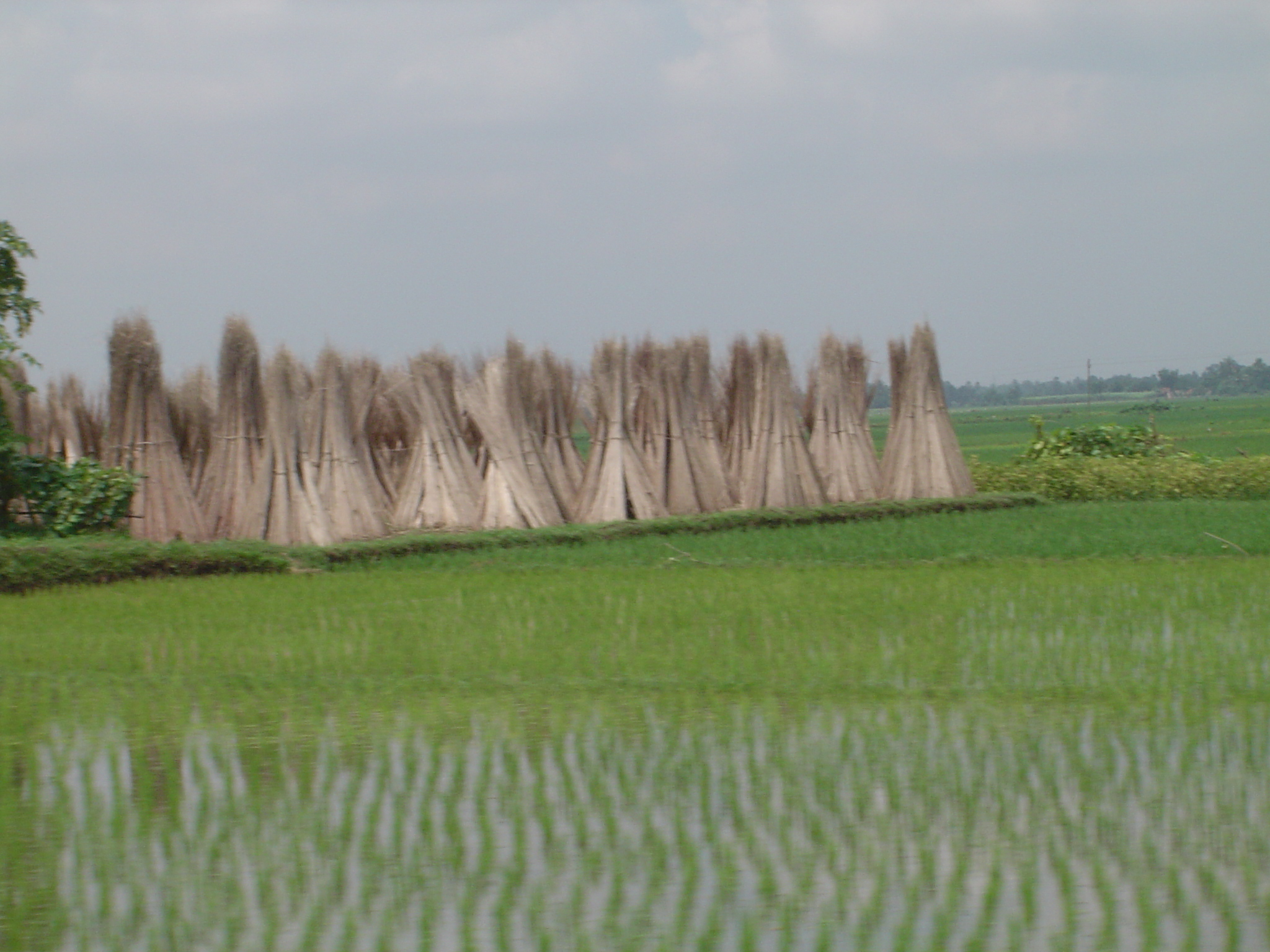
Freshly sown saplings of rice in a paddy; in the background are stacks of jute sticks.

Years after independence, West Bengal was dependent on the central government for assistance to meet its demands for food; food production remained stagnant, and the Indian green revolution bypassed the state. However, there has been a significant increase in food production since the 1980s and the state now has a surplus of grains. The state's share of total industrial output in India was 9.8% in 1980–1981, declining to 5% by 1997–1998. In contrast, the service sector has grown at a rate higher than the national rate. The state's total financial debt stood at ₹1,918,350 million (US$20 billion) as of 2011.

The economy of West Bengal in the 2000s performed below average compared to other Indian states. In the period 2004–2010, the average GSDP growth rate was 13.9% (calculated in Indian rupee terms) lower than 15.5%, the average for all states of the country. Since then, its economy has witnessed many surprising changes in direction. The agricultural sector in particular rose to 8.33% in 2010–11 before tumbling to −4.01% in 2012–13. Many major industries such as the Uttarpara Hindustan Motors car manufacturing unit, the jute industry, and the Haldia Petrochemicals unit experienced shutdowns in 2014. In the same year, plans for a 300 billion Jindal Steel project was mothballed. The state's tea industry has also witnessed shutdowns for financial and political reasons. In addition, its tourism industry was hurt in 2017 when the Gorkhaland agitation for statehood prompted tourists to cancel trips to Darjeeling.

As of 2015, West Bengal has the sixth-highest Gross State Domestic Product (GSDP) in India. GSDP at current prices (base 2004–2005) has increased from Rs 2,086.56 billion in 2004–05 to Rs 8,00,868 crores in 2014–2015, reaching Rs 10,21,000 crores in 2017–18. GSDP per cent growth at current prices varied from a 10.3% low in 2010–2011 to a 17.11% high in 2013–2014. The growth rate was 13.35% in 2014–2015. As of 2014–2015, per capita Net State Domestic Product (NSDP), which is GSDP without consumption of fixed capital, at current prices (base 2011-12) was Rs 68,876. Per-capita NSDP growth rate at current prices varied from a 9.4% low in 2010–2011 to a 16.15% high in 2013–2014. The growth rate was 12.62% in 2014–2015.

In 2015–2016, the percentage share of Gross Value Added (GVA) of factor cost to measure economic activity at the constant price (base year 2011–2012) for each sector was as follows—Agriculture-Forestry and Fishery–14.84%, Industry–18.51% and Services–66.65%. A observation was drawn that there has been a slow but steady decline in the percentage share of industry and agriculture over the years. Agriculture is the leading economic sector in West Bengal. Rice is the state's principal food crop. Its other top crops are potato, jute, sugarcane and wheat. Tea is produced commercially in northern districts; the region is well known for Darjeeling and other high-quality teas.

State industries are localised in the Kolkata region, the mineral-rich western highlands, and the Haldia Port region. The Durgapur-Asansol colliery belt is home to a number of steel plants. Important manufacturing industries include–engineering products, electronics, electrical equipment, cables, steel, leather, textiles, jewellery, frigates, automobiles, railway coaches and wagons. The Durgapur centre has established several industries in the areas of tea, sugar, chemicals and fertilisers. Natural resources like tea and jute in nearby areas have made West Bengal a major centre for the jute and tea industries.

In 2018, due to the effective changes in the stance towards industrialisation, ease of doing business has improved in West Bengal. Steps such as Bengal Global Business Summit are being taken to remedy this situation by promoting West Bengal as an investment destination. Further notable steps during this period include – to increase contribution of the state's textile sector to its GSDP, a leather complex in Kolkata was expanded with new investments; smart cities are being planned close to Kolkata; and metro expansion projects for e.g., Kolkata Metro blue line are in the offing to revive the economy. West Bengal was able to attract below 2 per cent of the Foreign direct investment (FDI) in the 2000s. In March 2025, Haldia Petrochemicals was exploring to open a polycarbonate production plant by investing Rs 8,500 crores. In July that year, the state government announced that it attracted Rs 1,33,000 crores from private investors and created 1,08,000 jobs across iron and steel, energy (oil and gas), and logistics sectors. The state also organised its eighth global summit in which the large industries received an investment of Rs 23,94,595 crores.

In 2024–2025, West Bengal's NSDP grew by 9.86% to Rs 16,32,000 crores with an improvement over the 8.94% growth recorded in previous fiscal year (FY). In the annual state budget allocation for this FY, West Bengal's government allocated Rs 22,620 crores to Agriculture and Allied activities of which Rs 5,800 crores was allocated for farmers' financial support and Rs 1,200 crores was allocated for crop insurance; Rs 47,470 crores was allocated for Education, Sports, Arts, and Culture of which Rs 18,029 crores was allocated to aid private secondary schools and Rs 7,732 crores was allocated to aid private primary schools. The state's industrial sector grew by 7.3% which exceeded that FY's national average of 6.2%. As of 2025–2026, West Bengal is India's sixth-largest economy with a projected GSDP of Rs 20,30,000 crores. The current GVA is as follows—Agriculture–21%, Industry–24%, and Services–55%. For the FY 2026–27, the GSDP was projected to be Rs 21,48,224 crores with an year-on-year growth of 8% meanwhile the state debt was projected to be reaching Rs 8,15,000 crores.

== Culture ==
=== Literature ===
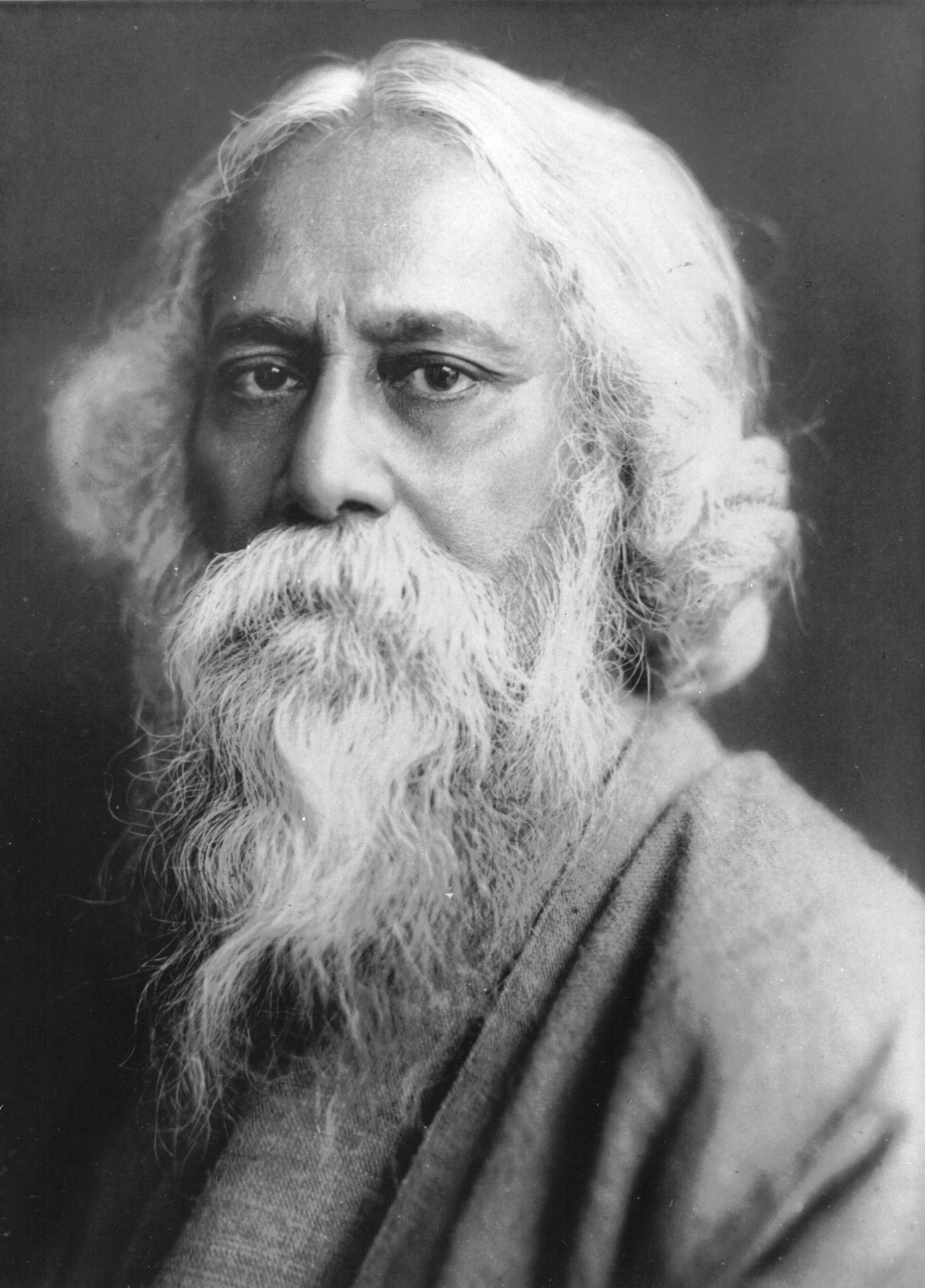
Rabindranath Tagore is Asia's first Nobel laureate and the composer of India's national anthem.

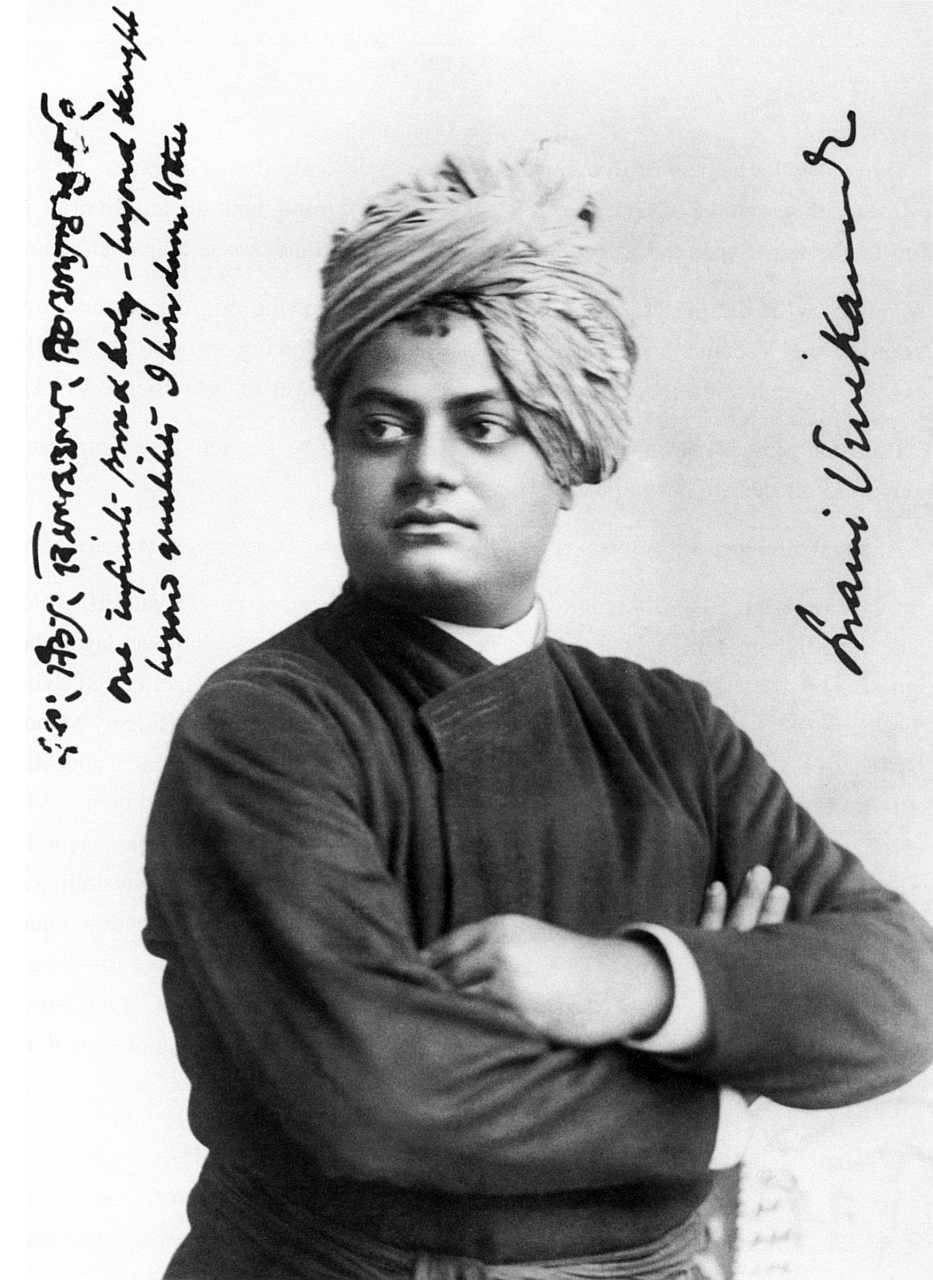
Swami Vivekananda was a key figure in introducing Vedanta and Yoga to Europe and the US, raising interfaith awareness and making Hinduism a world religion.

The Bengali language boasts a significant literary heritage it shares with neighbouring Bangladesh. West Bengal has a long tradition of folk literature, evidenced by the Charyapada, a collection of Buddhist mystic songs dating back to the 10th and 11th centuries; Mangalkavya, a collection of Hindu narrative poetry composed around the 13th century; Shreekrishna Kirtana, a pastoral Vaishnava drama in verse composed by Boru Chandidas; Thakurmar Jhuli, a collection of Bengali folk and fairy tales compiled by Dakshinaranjan Mitra Majumder; and stories of Gopal Bhar, a court jester in medieval Bengal.

In the 19th and 20th centuries, Bengali literature was modernised in the works of authors such as Bankim Chandra Chattopadhyay, whose works marked a departure from the traditional verse-oriented writings prevalent in that period; Michael Madhusudan Dutt, a pioneer in Bengali drama who introduced the use of blank verse; and Rabindranath Tagore, who reshaped Bengali literature and music. Indian art saw the introduction of Contextual Modernism in the late 19th and early 20th centuries. Other notable figures include Kazi Nazrul Islam, whose compositions form the avant-garde genre of Nazrul Sangeet, Sarat Chandra Chattopadhyay, whose works on contemporary social practices in Bengal are widely acclaimed, and Manik Bandyopadhyay, who is considered one of the leading lights of modern Bengali fiction.

In the 21st century, Jibanananda Das has been acknowledged as "the premier poet of the post-Tagore era in India". Other writers include–Bibhutibhushan Bandopadhyay, best known for his work Pather Panchali, which was later adapted into a Bengali film of the same name by Satyajit Ray; Tarashankar Bandopadhyay, well known for his portrayal of the lower strata of society; and Ashapurna Devi, Shirshendu Mukhopadhyay, Saradindu Bandopadhyay, Buddhadeb Guha, Mahashweta Devi, Samaresh Majumdar, Sanjeev Chattopadhyay, Shakti Chattopadhyay, Buddhadeb Basu, Joy Goswami and Sunil Gangopadhyay.

=== Music and dance ===
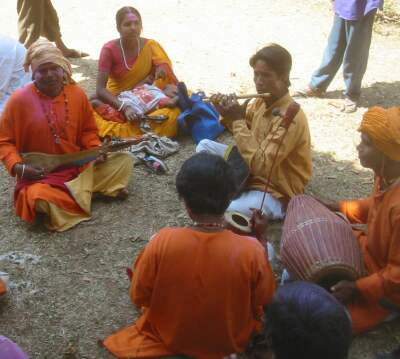
Baul singers at Basanta-Utsab, Shantiniketan

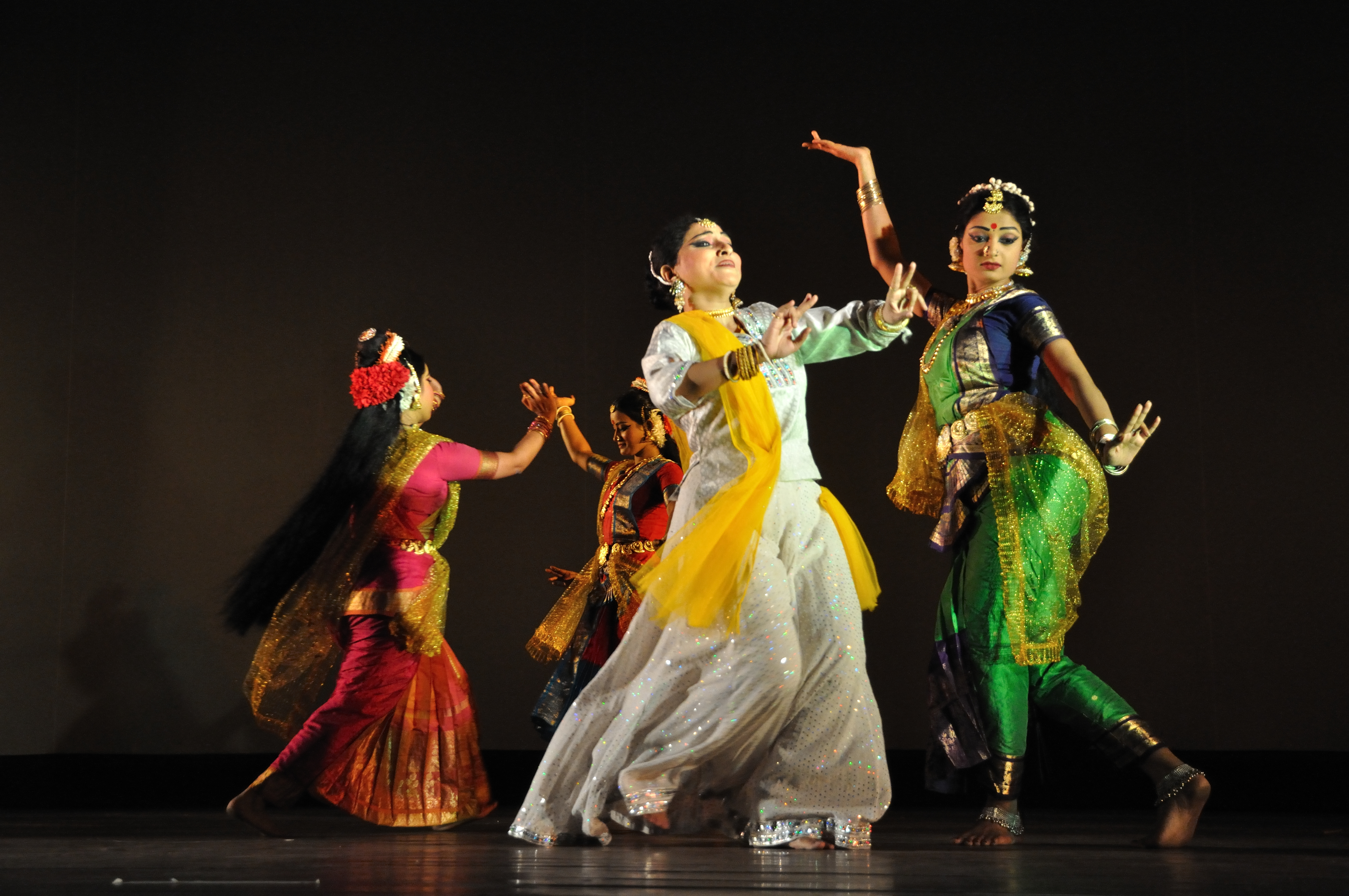
Dance with Rabindra Sangeet, Kolkata

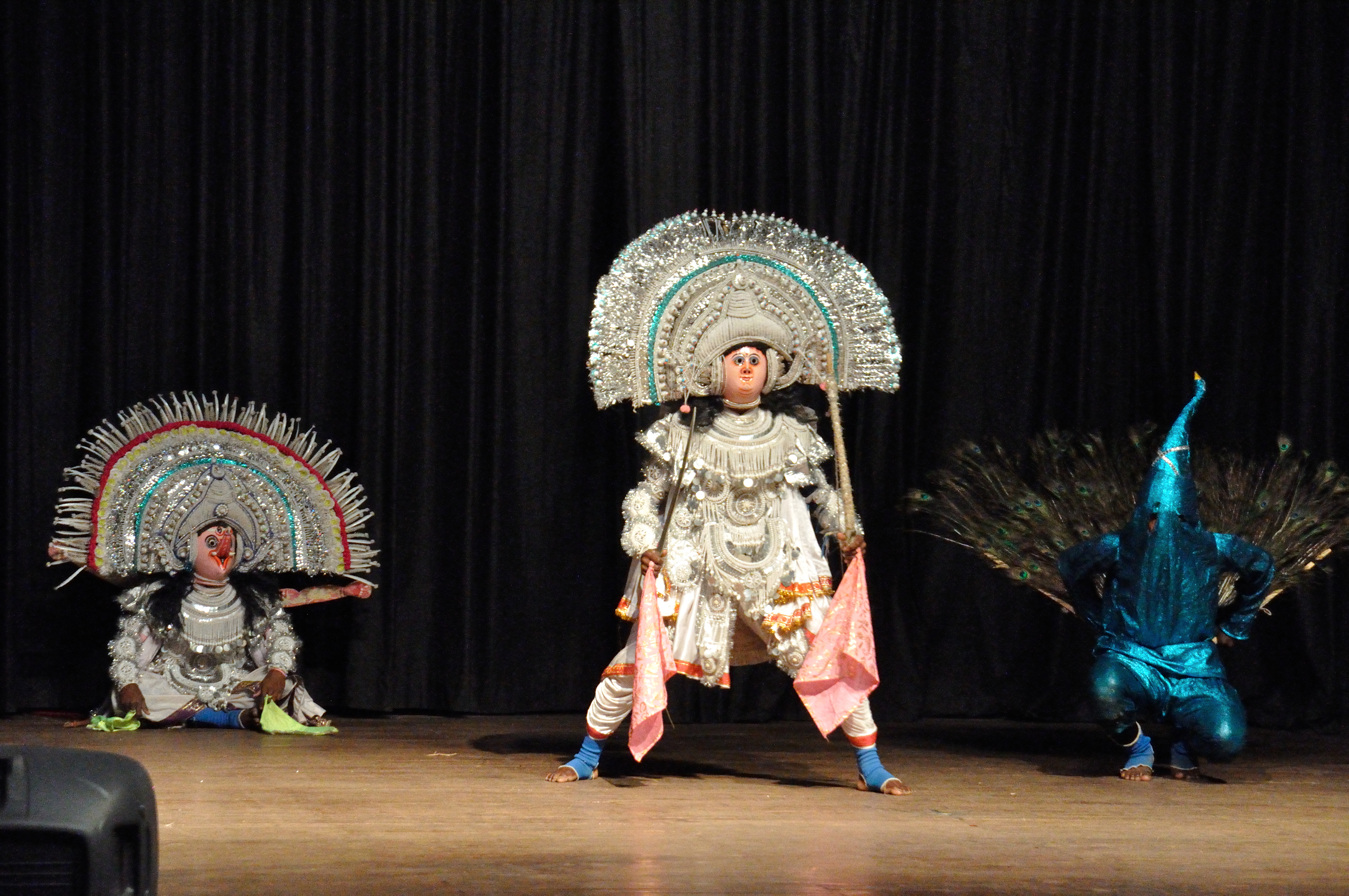
Chhau Dance, Kolkata

A notable music tradition in West Bengal is the Baul music, practised by the Bauls, a sect of mystic minstrels. Other folk music forms include Gombhira and Bhawaiya. Folk music in West Bengal is often accompanied by the ektara, a one-stringed instrument. Shyama Sangeet is a genre of devotional songs, praising the Hindu goddess Kali; Kirtan refers to the devotional group songs performed in dedication to the Hindu god Krishna. Rabindra Sangeet, songs composed and written by Rabindranath Tagore, and Nazrul Geeti (by Kazi Nazrul Islam) are popular. Just as other states in northern India, West Bengal has a heritage in Hindustani classical music.

Other significant songwriters and their music include–Dwijendralal Ray with his most notable song being "Dhana Dhanya Pushpa Bhara", Atul Prasad Sen, Rajanikanta Sen, and adhunik or modern music from films and other composers. In late-1970s, Indian Bengali rock emerged following which in the early-1990s a new Bengali music genre called jibonmukhi gaan (or songs about life) had formed. Bengali dance forms draw from folk traditions, especially with those of the tribal groups, as well as the broader Indian dance traditions. Chhau dance of Purulia is an uncommon form of masked dance.

=== Films ===
West Bengali films are shot mostly in studios in the Kolkata neighbourhood of Tollygunge; the name "Tollywood" (similar to Hollywood and Bollywood) is derived from that name. The Bengali film industry is well known for its art films, and has produced acclaimed directors like Satyajit Ray, who is widely regarded as one of the greatest filmmakers of the 20th century; Mrinal Sen, whose films were known for their artistic depiction of social reality. Other notable directors include Tapan Sinha; and Ritwik Ghatak, whose films centred on refugees post-India partition and the Bangladesh Liberation War. Some contemporary directors include these long time filmmakers namely Buddhadeb Dasgupta, Tarun Majumdar, Goutam Ghose, Aparna Sen, Rituparno Ghosh, and emerging ones such as Kaushik Ganguly and Srijit Mukherji.

Uttam Kumar was the most popular lead actor in both Tollywood as well as Bollywood for decades from 1950s to 1970s, and his romantic pairing with actress Suchitra Sen in films attained legendary status. Soumitra Chatterjee, who acted in many Satyajit Ray-films, and Prosenjit Chatterjee are among other popular lead male actors. As of 2026, Bengali films have won India's annual National Film Award for Best Feature Film twenty-two times in sixty seven years, the highest among all Indian languages.

=== Fine arts ===
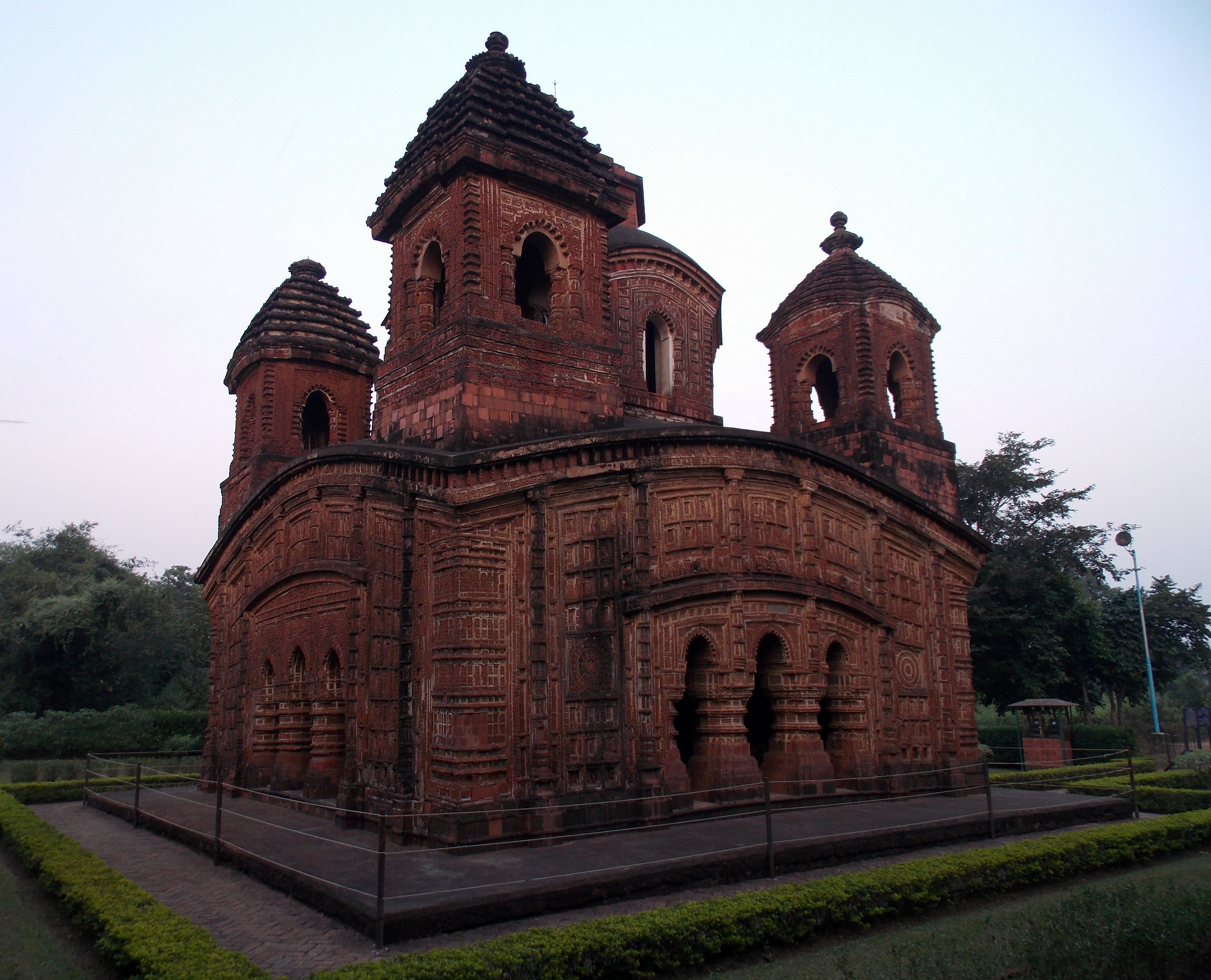
Panchchura Temple in Bishnupur, one of the older examples of the terracotta arts of India.

There are significant examples of fine arts in Bengal from the 17th and 18th centuries, during the Malla dynasty, including the terracotta art of Hindu temples and the Kalighat paintings. Bengal has been the frontrunner of modernism in fine arts in India. Abanindranath Tagore, called the "father of modern Indian art", founded the Bengal School of Art in the early-20th century, which had one of its goals as to promote the development of styles of art outside the European realist tradition that had been taught in art colleges under the British colonial administration. This movement had many adherents which include but not limited to– Gaganendranath Tagore, Ramkinkar Baij, Jamini Roy and Rabindranath Tagore. After Indian Independence, important groups such as the Calcutta Group and the Society of Contemporary Artists were formed in West Bengal, and it later had a significant impact on the art scene in India.

=== Reformist heritage ===
The capital, Kolkata, was the workplace of several social reformers, including Raja Ram Mohan Roy, Iswar Chandra Vidyasagar and Swami Vivekananda. Their social reforms eventually led to a cultural atmosphere that made it possible for practices like sati, dowry, and caste-based discrimination, or untouchability, to be abolished. The region was also home to several religious teachers, such as Chaitanya, Ramakrishna, Prabhupada and Paramahansa Yogananda.

=== Cuisine ===
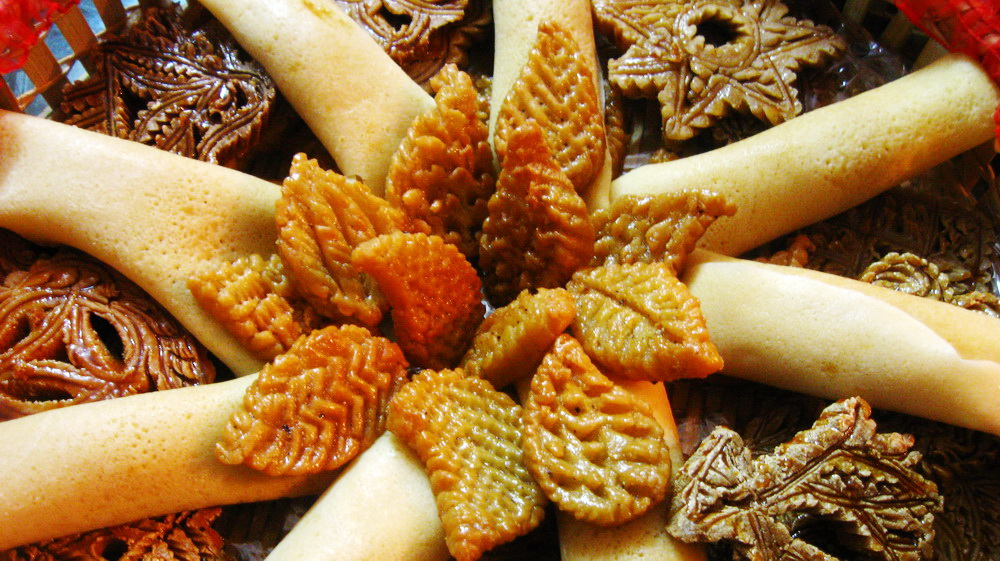
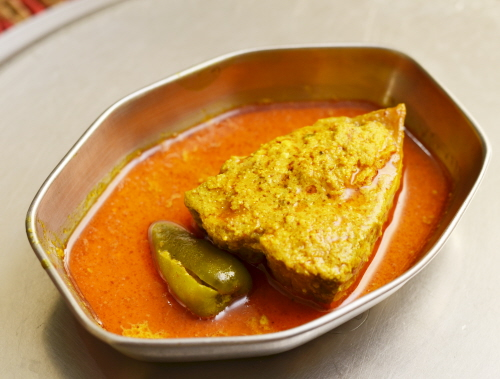
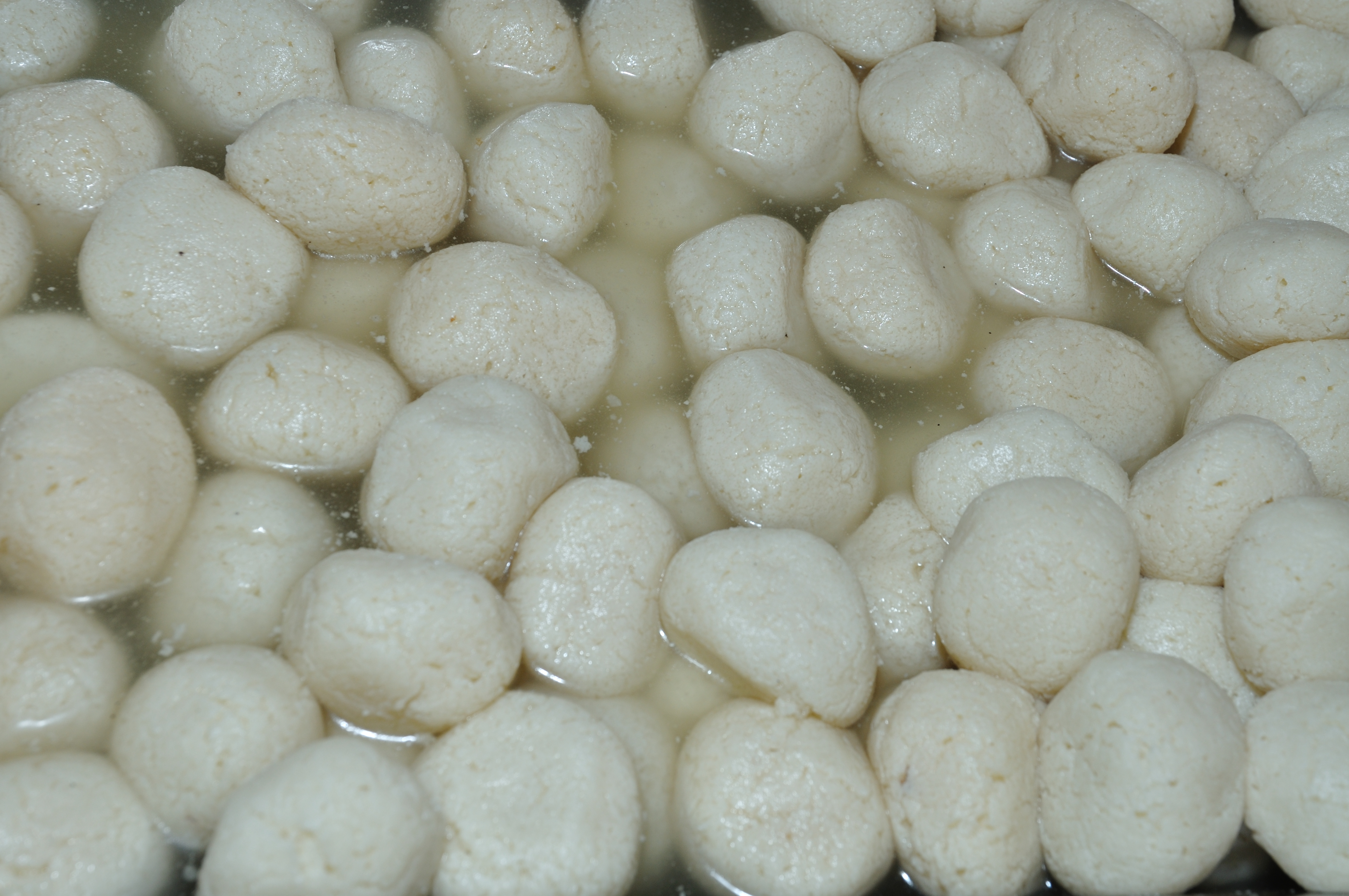
Assorted food eaten in West Bengal: Patisapta, a kind of pitha; shorshe ilish (hilsha with mustard sauce); and rasgullas in sugar syrup

Rice and fish are traditional favourite foods in West Bengal, leading to a popular saying in Bengali, macche bhate bangali (or "fish and rice make a Bengali"). Bengal's vast repertoire of fish-based dishes includes hilsa preparations, a favourite among Bengalis; pabda, chingdi (in particular tiger shrimp), bhetki, shutki (dried fish), rui (rohu), katla, and bata. Different forms of cooked fishes in Bengali cuisine can be found including jhol (thin gravy), jhal (hot and spicy), malai curry (mildly spiced with coconut milk), chop (covered in crumbs and mashed potatoes), and cutlet (crumbed and fried). Most of the population also consume eggs, chicken, mutton, and shrimp. Panta bhat (rice soaked overnight in water) with onions and green chillies is a traditional dish consumed in rural areas.

Common spices found in a Bengali kitchen include posto, cumin, ajmoda (radhuni), bay leaf, mustard, ginger, garlic, green chillies and turmeric. Bengali sweets occupy an important place in the diet of Bengalis and at their social ceremonies. Bengalis make distinctive sweetmeats from milk products (specifically using Chhena), including Rôshogolla, Chômchôm, Kalojam and several kinds of sondesh. Sweets such as Pitha, a kind of sweet cake; narkel-naru (coconut laddu), til-naru (sesame laddu), moa (particularly Jaynagarer Moa), and payesh are prepared during Bengali festivals. Dim sum, a Chinese dish, is served in the Chinatown of Tiriti Bazaar, Kolkata. Popular street foods include Aloor Chop, Beguni, Kati roll, Kolkata biryani, and phuchka.

=== Clothing ===
Jamdani Sari of Bangladesh is very popular in West Bengal.

Bengali women commonly wear the sari, often distinctly designed according to local cultural customs. In urban areas, many women and men wear western attire. Among men, western dress has a greater acceptance. Particularly on cultural occasions such as festivals and events, men also wear traditional costumes such as the panjabi with dhuti while women wear salwar kameez or sari.

West Bengal produces several varieties of cotton and silk saris in the country. Handlooms are a popular way for the state's rural population to earn a living through weaving. Every district has weaving clusters, which are home to artisan communities, each specialising in specific varieties of handloom weaving. Notable handloom saris include Tant, Jamdani, Garad, Korial, Baluchari, Tussar, Shantipuri and Murshidabad silk.

=== Festivals ===
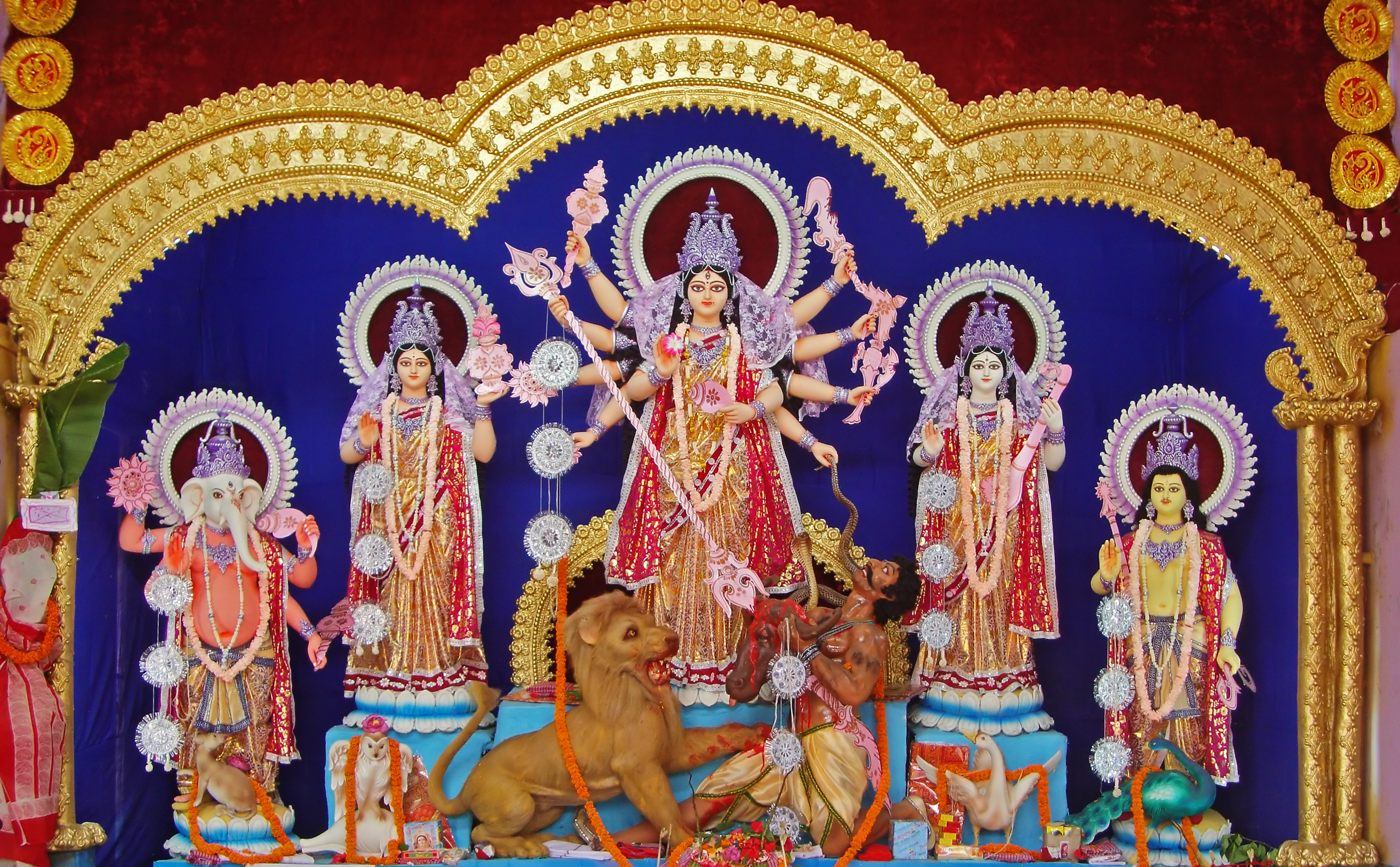
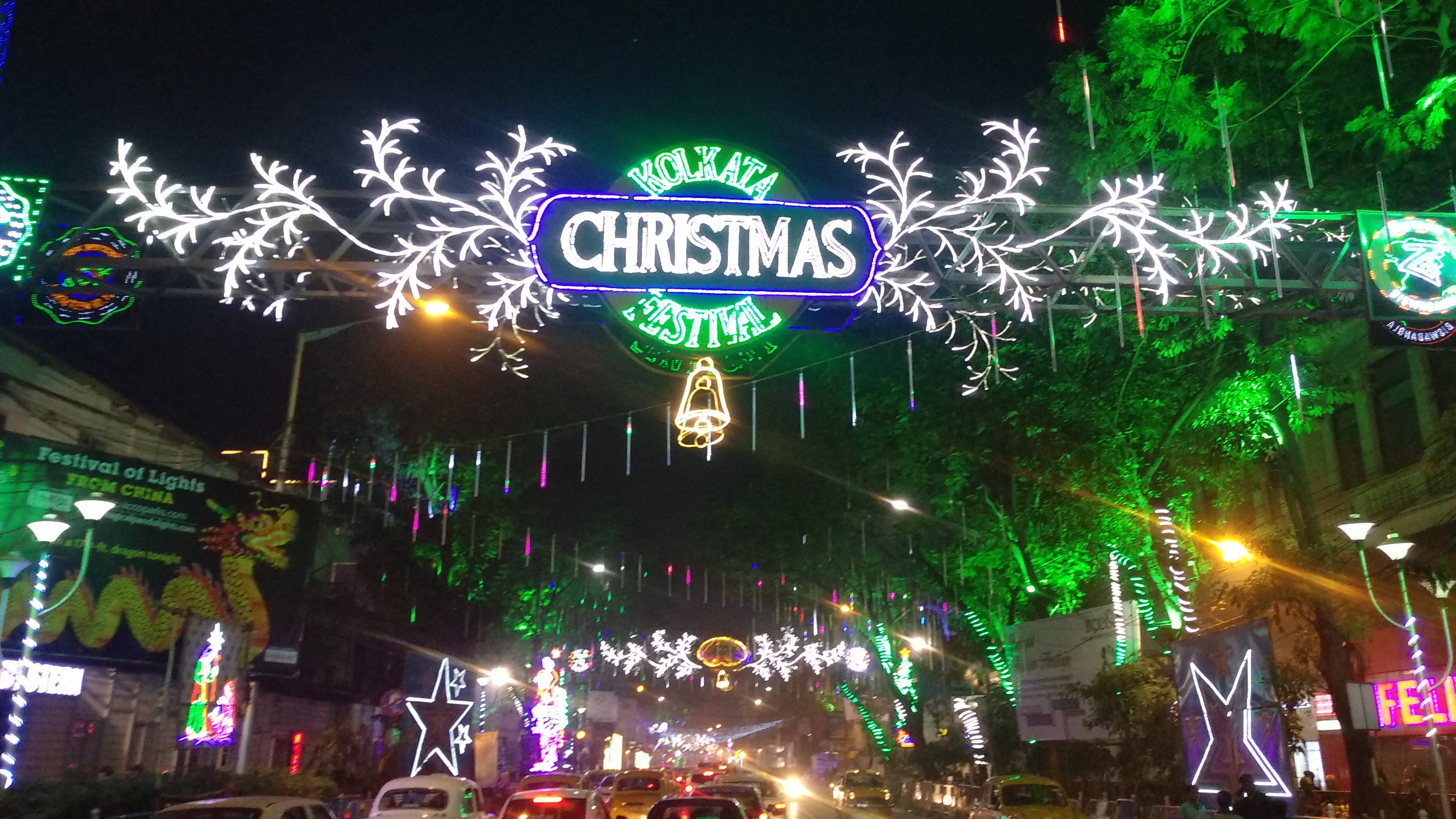
Festivals of West Bengal: Durga Puja in a Burdwan temple; Eid al-Fitr in Kolkata; Christmas in Park Street, Kolkata; and Buddha Purnima in Darjeeling

The different Hindu festivals which are commonly celebrated in West Bengal include – Durga Puja, which is the largest, most popular and widely celebrated festival in West Bengal; Rath Yatra, which is a Hindu festival celebrating Jagannath, a form of Krishna; Tarakeswar Yatra, where each year between July and August or Shravana (month), nearly 3 million devotees come from various parts of India to worship Shiva; Poush Mela, which is a popular winter festival of Shantiniketan, with performances of folk music, Baul songs, dance, and theatre taking place throughout the town; and Gangasagar Mela, where hundreds of thousands of Hindu pilgrims congregate where the river Ganges meets the sea to take a bath.

The most popular Muslim festival in West Bengal is Eid al-Fitr, where the people celebrate the end of Ramadan with prayers, alms-giving, shopping, gift-giving, and feasting. Christmas, celebrated by many people in the state only comes second to Durga Puja in popularity where large masses of people go to parks, gardens, museums, parties, fairs, churches and other places to celebrate the festival. People going to Hindu temples celebrate the festival there too by following specific rituals. The most important Buddhist festival in West Bengal, Buddha Purnima, also observed by many Hindus, is celebrated with much gusto in the Darjeeling hills. The Lamas chant mantras and sound their bugles meanwhile students as well as people from every community carry the holy books or pustaks on their heads.

== Transport ==
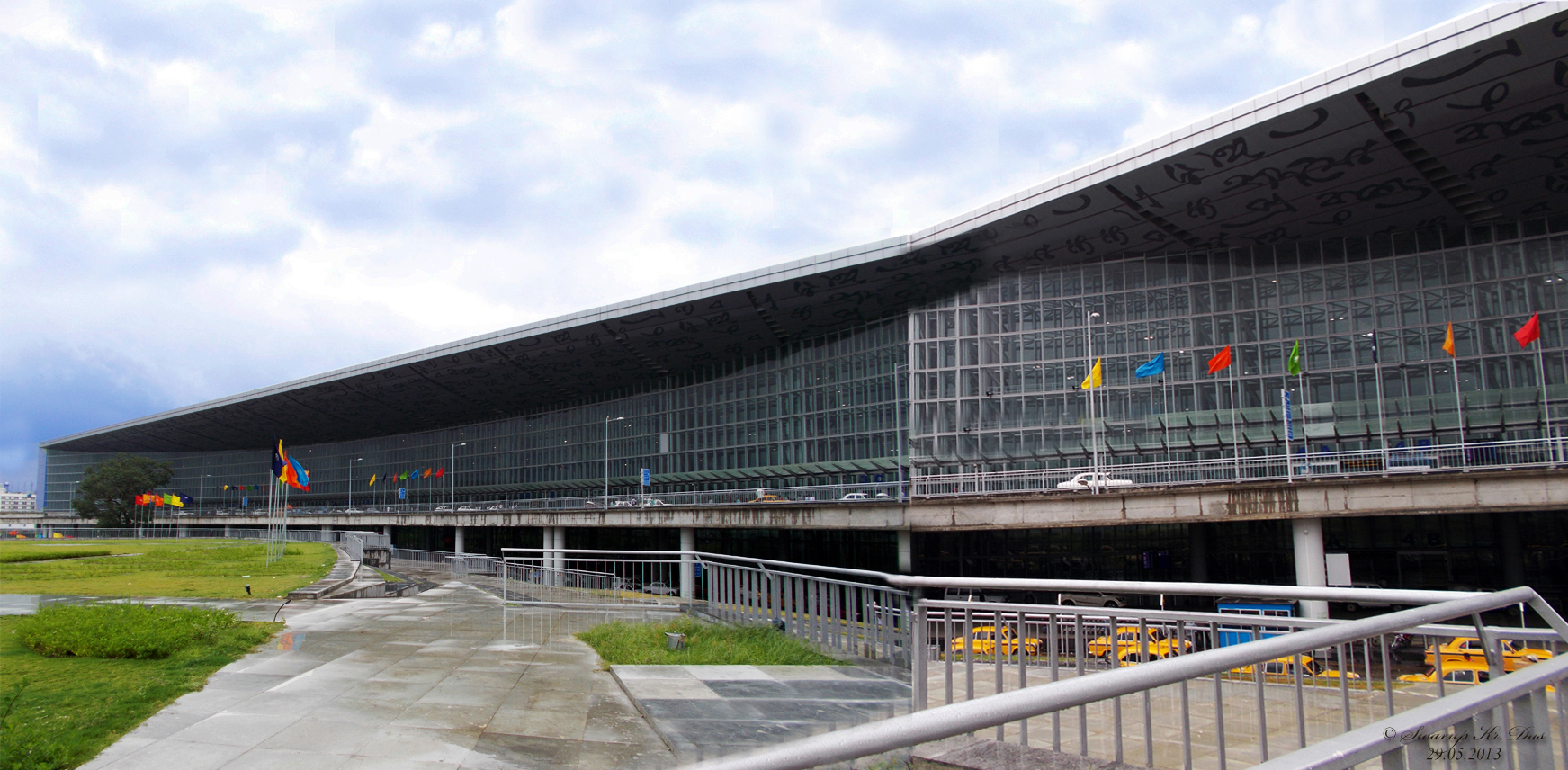
Netaji Subhas Chandra Bose International Airport is a hub for flights to and from Northeast India, Bangladesh, East Asia, Nepal and Bhutan

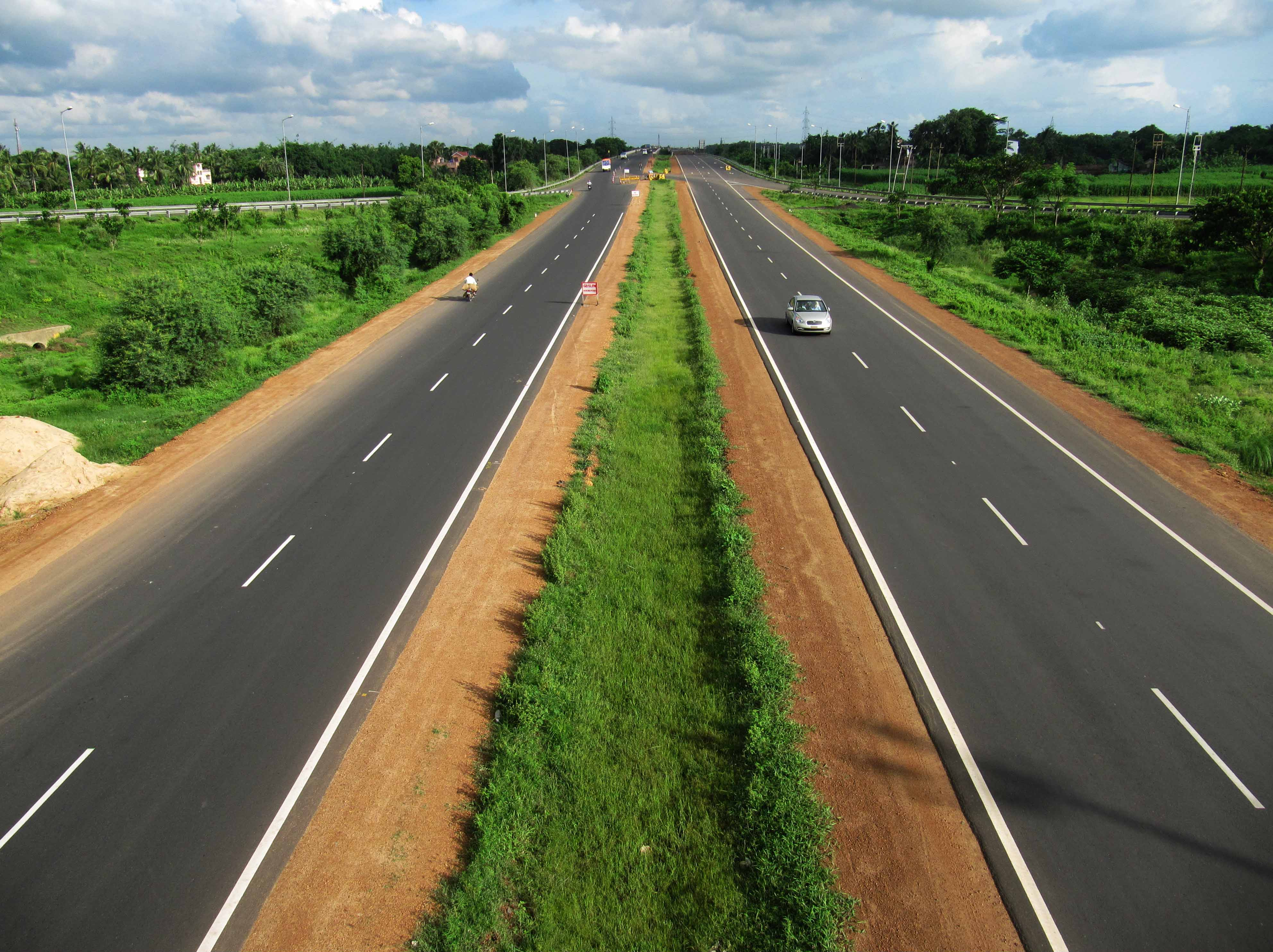
Durgapur Expressway

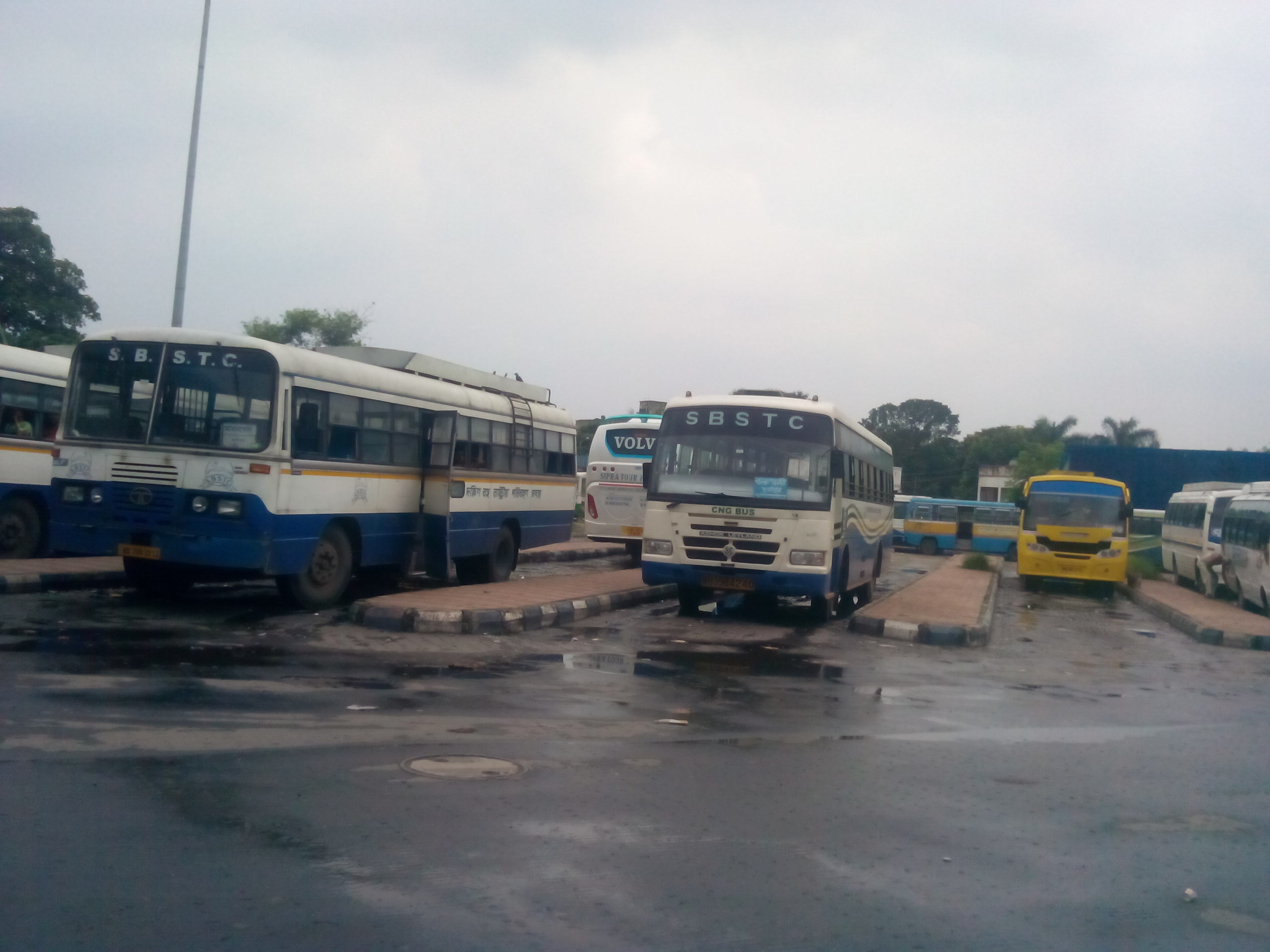
An SBSTC bus in Karunamoyee, East Kolkata

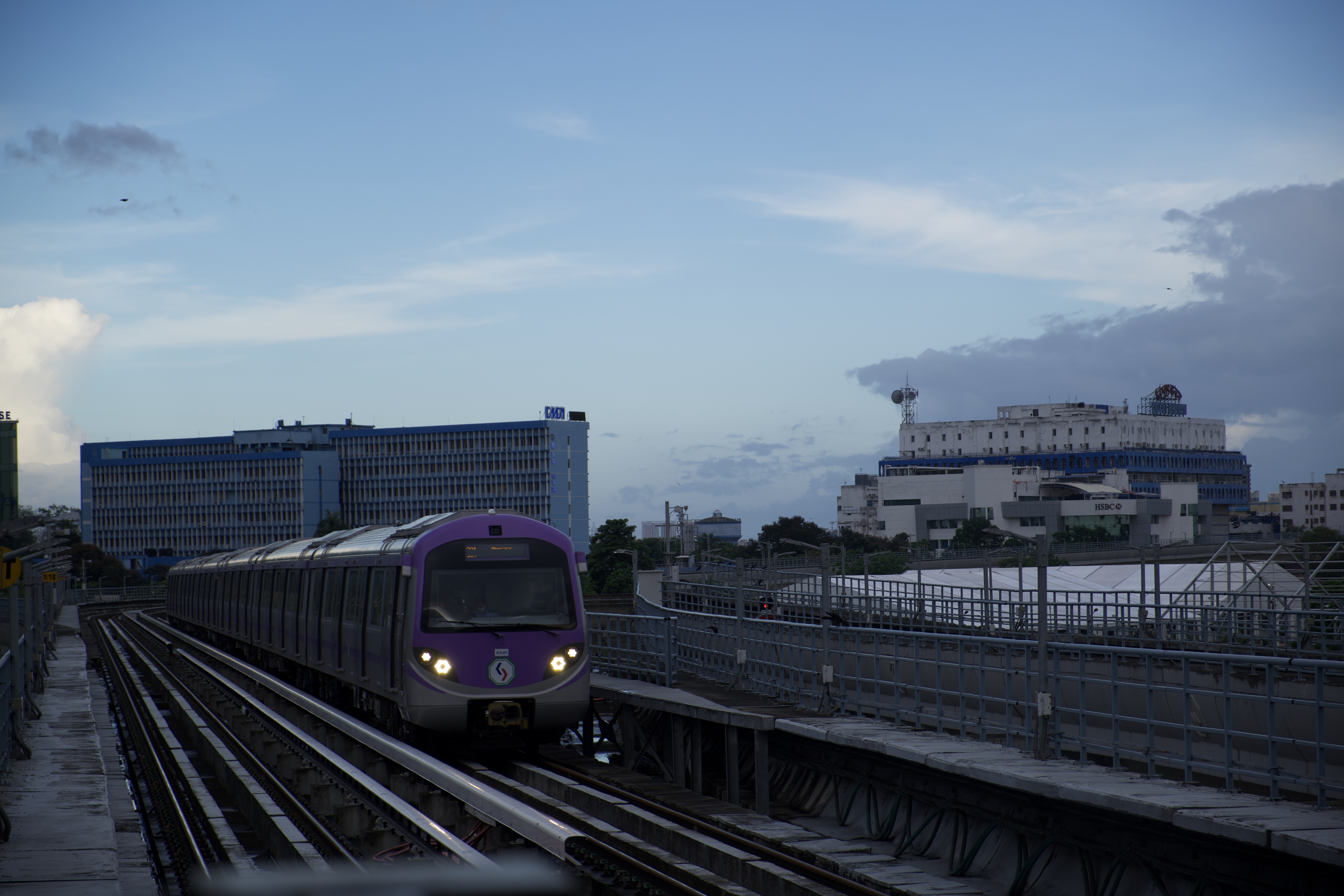
Kolkata Metro, India's first metro rail system

As of 2006, the road density of the state was 103.69 kilometres per square kilometre (166.87 miles per square mile), higher than the national average of 74.7 km/km^{2} (120.2 mi/sq mi). In 2011, the total length of surface roads in West Bengal was over 92,023 kilometres (57,180 miles); national highways comprise 2,578 km (1,602 mi) and state highways 2,393 km (1,487 mi). A decade later, in 2021, the state's total road length had increased to 286,368 kilometres (177,941 miles) with surface roads accounting for 202,597 km (125,888 mi), national highways of 3,664 km (2,277 mi), and state highways of 3,714 km (2,308 mi). In 2022, the state's urban road length measured at 95,180 kilometres (59,142 miles) was found to be more than other Indian states, and rural roads was of 157,849 km (98,083 mi). In the same year, the road density of the state was 1,072.42 km/km^{2} (1,725.89 mi/sq mi).

As of 2011, the total railway route length was around 4,481 km (2,784 mi). Kolkata is the headquarters of three zones of the Indian Railways—Eastern Railway and South Eastern Railway and the Kolkata Metro, which is the newly formed 17th zone of the Indian Railways. The Northeast Frontier Railway (NFR) serves the northern parts of the state. The Kolkata metro, in operation since 1984, is the country's first underground railway. The Darjeeling Himalayan Railway, part of NFR, is a UNESCO World Heritage Site.

Netaji Subhas Chandra Bose International Airport at Dum Dum, Kolkata, is the state's largest airport. Bagdogra Airport near Siliguri is a customs airport that offers international service to Bhutan and Thailand, besides regular domestic service. Kazi Nazrul Islam Airport, India's first private sector aerotropolis, opened in 2015, serves the twin cities of Asansol-Durgapur at Andal, Paschim Bardhaman.

Kolkata is a major river port in eastern India. The Kolkata Port Trust manages the Kolkata and the Haldia docks. There is passenger service to Port Blair on the Andaman and Nicobar Islands. Cargo ship service operates to other ports in India and abroad, operated by the Shipping Corporation of India (SCI). Ferries are a principal mode of transport in the southern part of the state, especially in the Sundarbans area. Kolkata is the only city in India to have trams as a mode of transport; these are operated by the Calcutta Tramways Company.

Several government-owned organisations operate bus services in the state, including: the Calcutta State Transport Corporation, the North Bengal State Transport Corporation, the South Bengal State Transport Corporation, the West Bengal Surface Transport Corporation and the Calcutta Tramways Company. There are also private bus companies. The railway system is a nationalised service without any private investment. Hired forms of transport include metered taxis and auto rickshaws, which often ply specific routes in cities. In most of the state, cycle rickshaws and in Kolkata, hand-pulled rickshaws and electric rickshaws are used for short-distance travel.

== Education ==
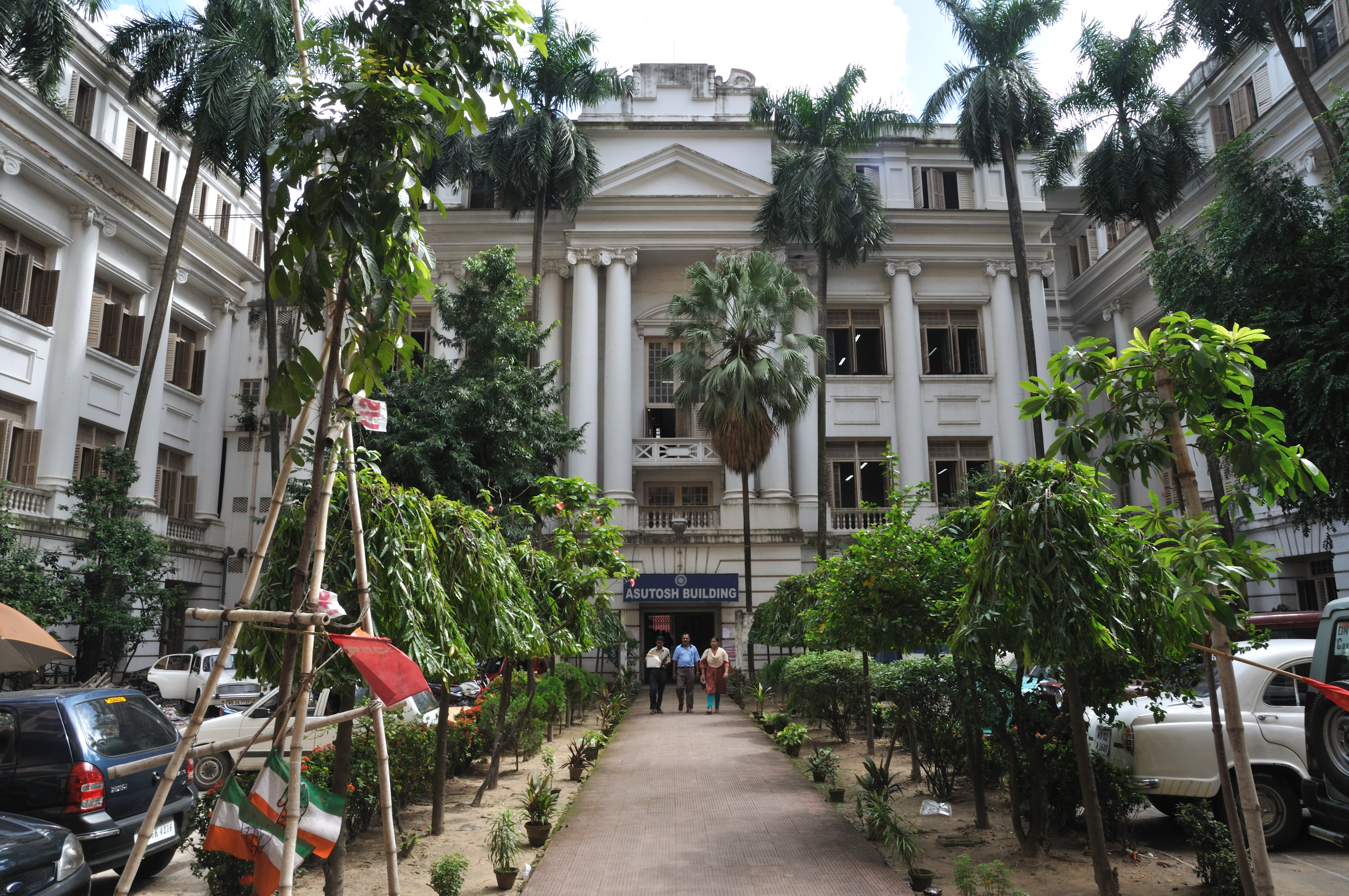
University of Calcutta, the oldest public university of India

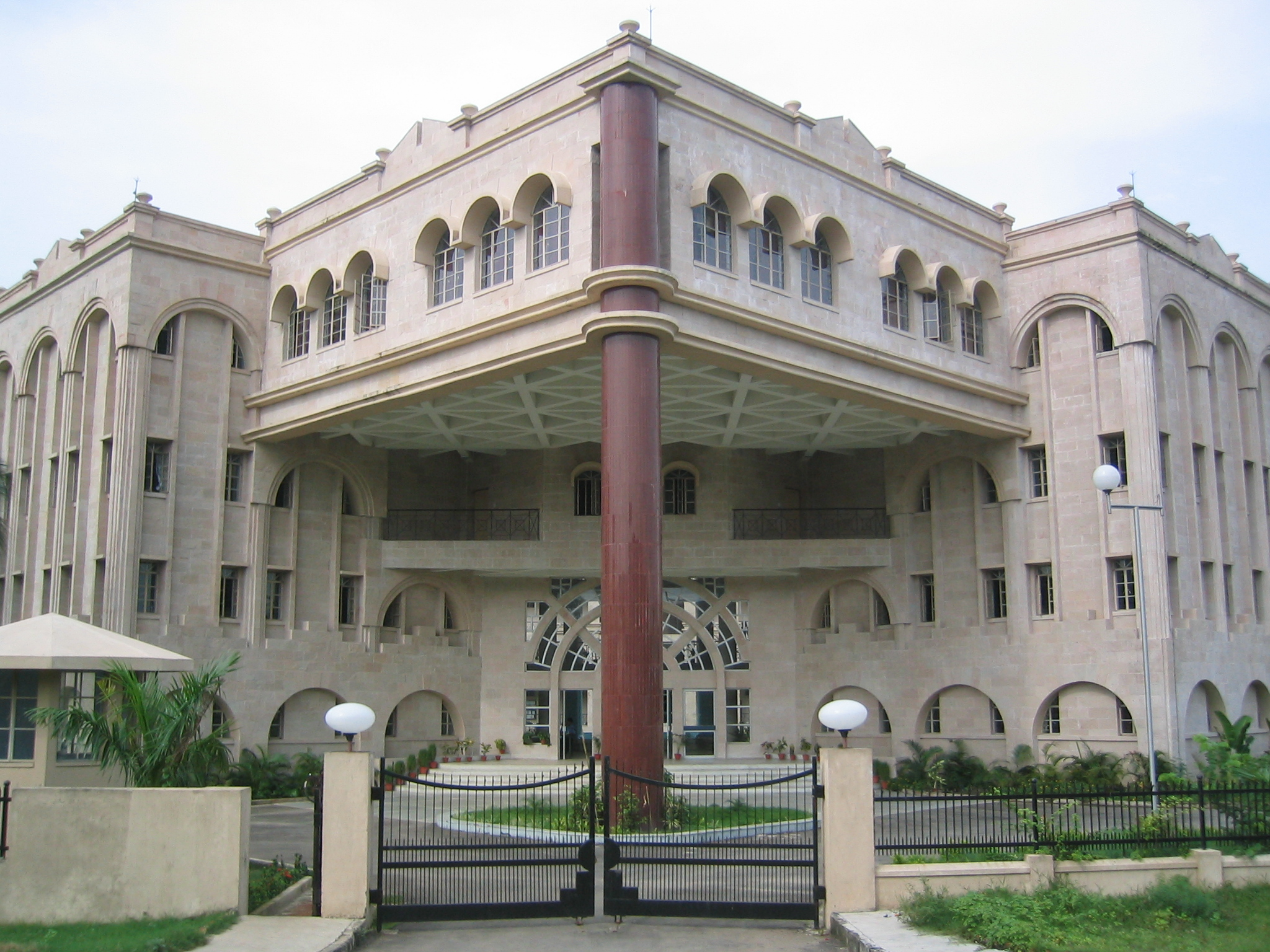
The front entrance to the academic block of the National University of Juridical Sciences, Kolkata

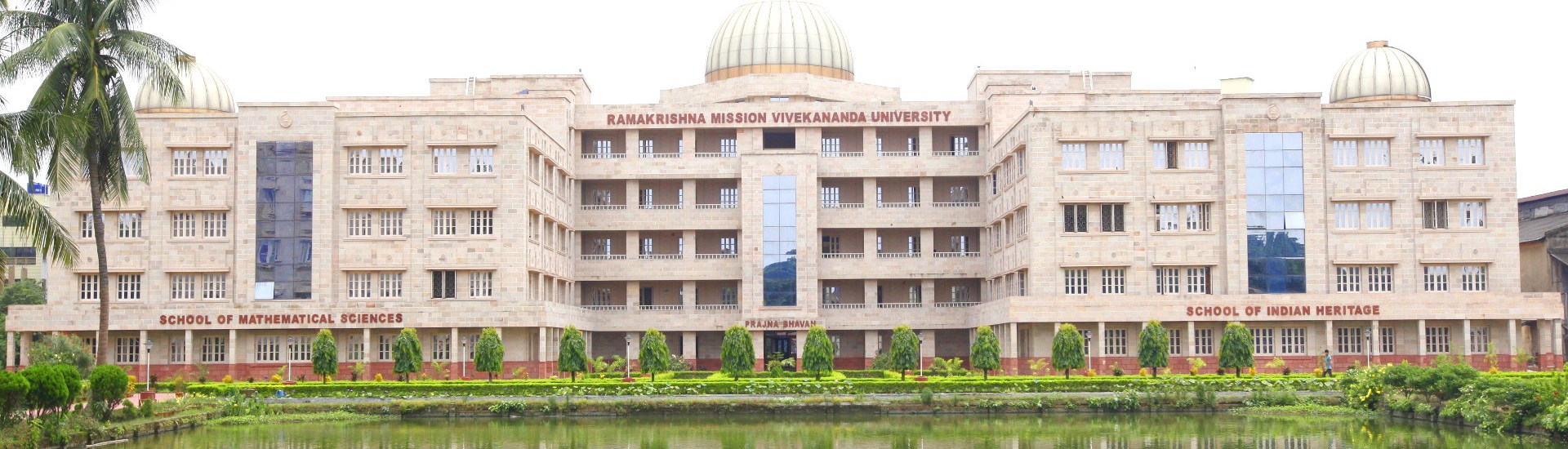
Prajna Bhavan, housing the School of Mathematical Sciences and School of RKMVU

West Bengal schools are run by the state government or by private organisations, including religious institutions. The medium of instruction used for schooling in West Bengal include multiple languages namely English, Bengali, Urdu, Hindi, Oriya, and Tamil. Primary schools are affiliated with the West Bengal Board of Primary Education (WBBPE), and secondary schools are affiliated with the Council for the Indian School Certificate Examinations (CISCE), the Central Board for Secondary Education (CBSE), the National Institute of Open School (NIOS), West Bengal Board of Secondary Education, or the West Bengal Board of Madrasah Education.

As of 2016, 85% of children within the 6–17 years age group attend school (86% do so in urban areas and 84% in rural areas). School attendance is almost universal among the 6–14 years age group, which drops to 70% within the 15–17 years age group. There is a gender disparity in school attendance in the 6–14 years age group, by which more girls than boys are attending school. In West Bengal, 71% of women aged 15–49 years and 81% of men aged 15–49 years are literate. Only 14% of women aged 15–49 years in the state have completed 12 or more years of schooling, compared with 22% of men. 22% of women and 14% of men aged 15–49 years have never attended school.

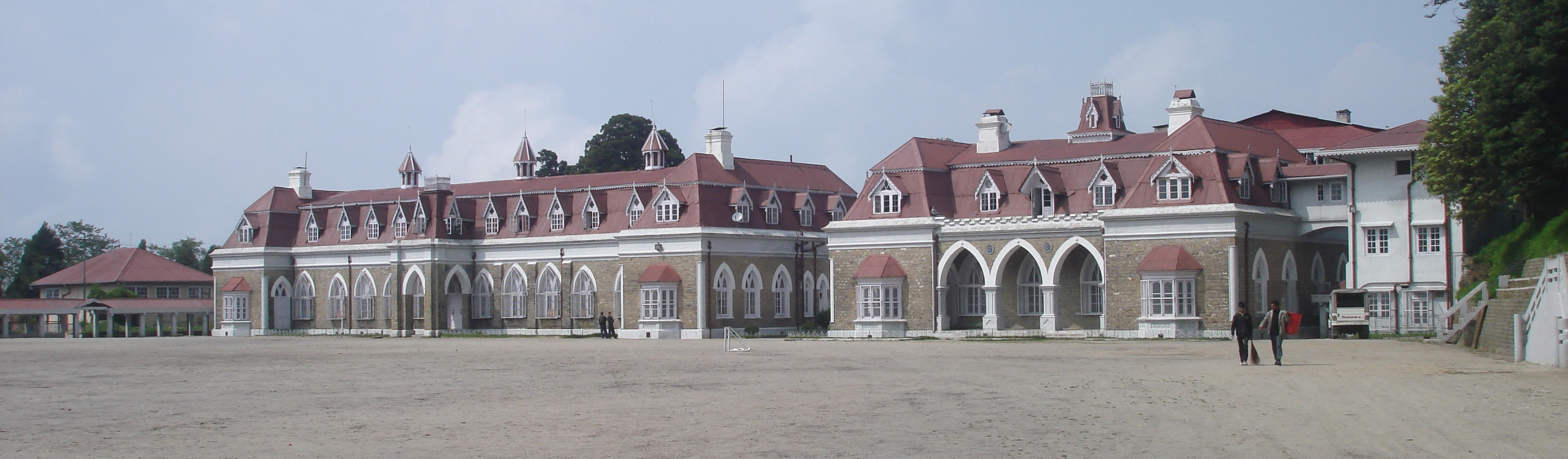
St. Paul's School, Darjeeling, the oldest and highest (by elevation) British era public school in Asia.

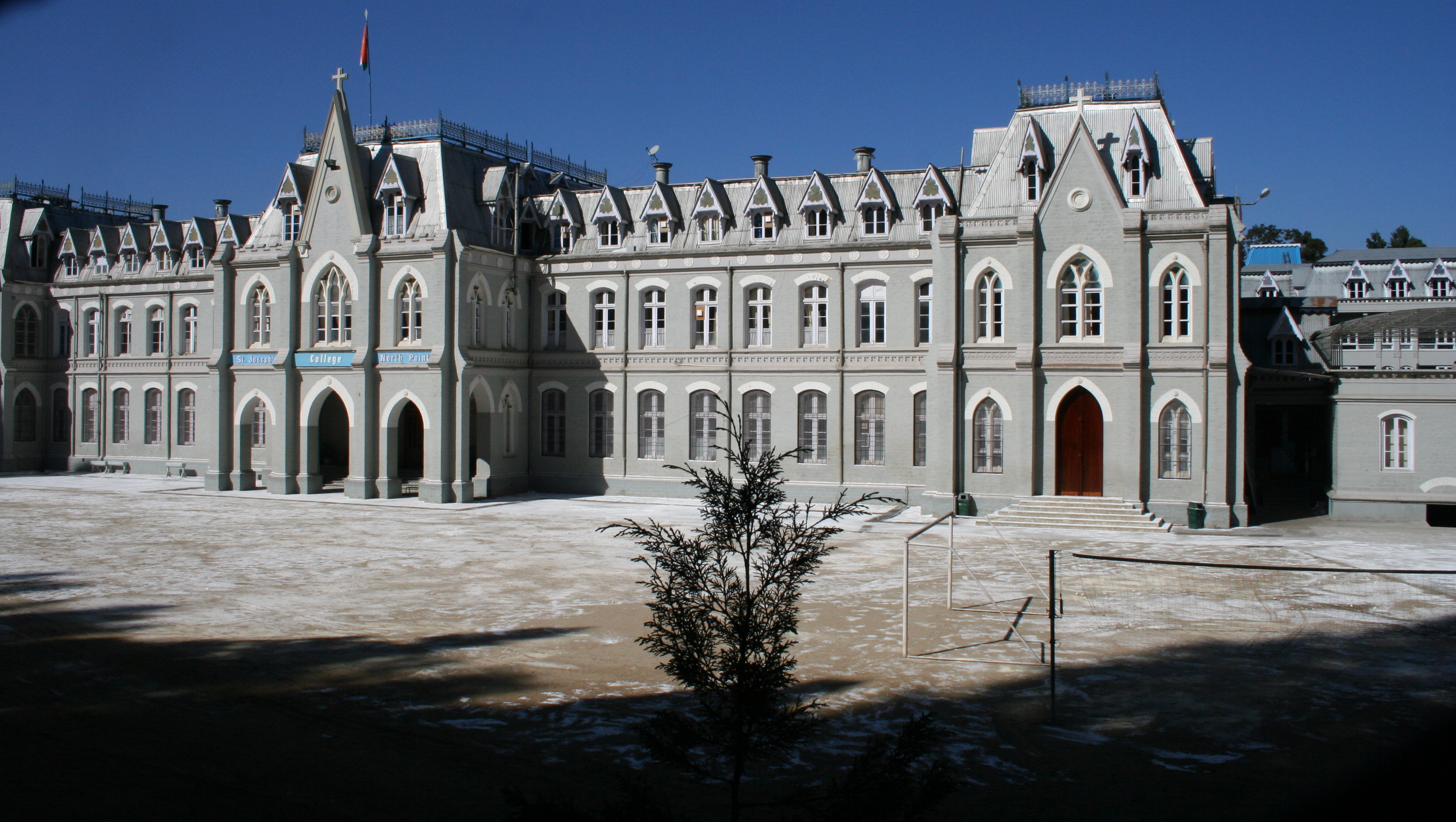
St. Joseph's School, Darjeeling

Some of the notable schools in Kolkata are–Ramakrishna Mission Narendrapur, Baranagore Ramakrishna Mission, Sister Nivedita Girls' School, Hindu School, Hare School, La Martiniere Calcutta, Calcutta Boys' School, St. James' School (Kolkata), South Point School, St. Xavier's Collegiate School, Loreto House, and Loreto Convent. In a 2014 review by the Education World magazine, some of these schools are ranked among the best schools in the country. Many of the schools in Kolkata and Darjeeling are colonial-era establishments housed in buildings that are exemplars of neo-classical architecture. Darjeeling's schools include: St. Paul's, St. Joseph's North Point, Goethals Memorial School, and Dow Hill in Kurseong.

West Bengal has eighteen universities. Kolkata has played a pioneering role in the development of the modern education system in India. It was the gateway to the revolution of European education during the British Raj. William Jones established the Asiatic Society in 1794 to promote oriental studies. Various reformers and educationalists such as Ram Mohan Roy, David Hare, Ishwar Chandra Vidyasagar, Alexander Duff and William Carey played leading roles in setting up modern schools and colleges in the city.

The University of Calcutta, the oldest and one of the most prestigious public universities in India, has 136 affiliated colleges. Fort William College was established in 1810. The Hindu College (now Presidency University) was established in 1817. The Lady Brabourne College was established in 1939. The Scottish Church College, the oldest Christian liberal arts college in South Asia, started in 1830. The Vidyasagar College was established in 1872 and was the first purely Indian-run private college in India. In 1855, the Hindu College was renamed to the Presidency College. The state government granted it university status in 2010 and it was renamed as Presidency University. Kazi Nazrul University was established in 2012. The University of Calcutta and Jadavpur University are prestigious technical universities. Visva-Bharati University at Santiniketan is a central university and an institution of national importance.

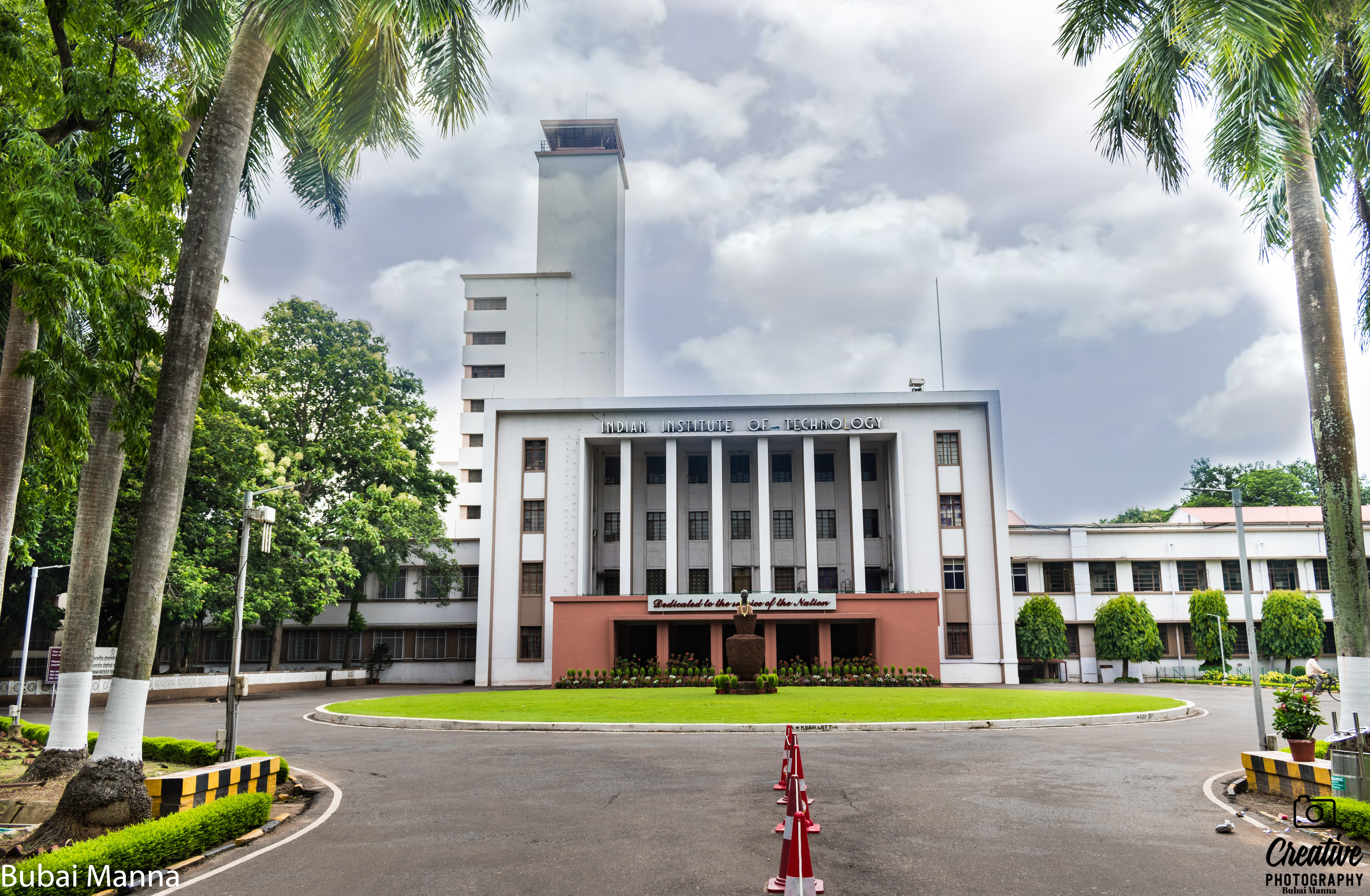
IIT Kharagpur, the first IIT of India

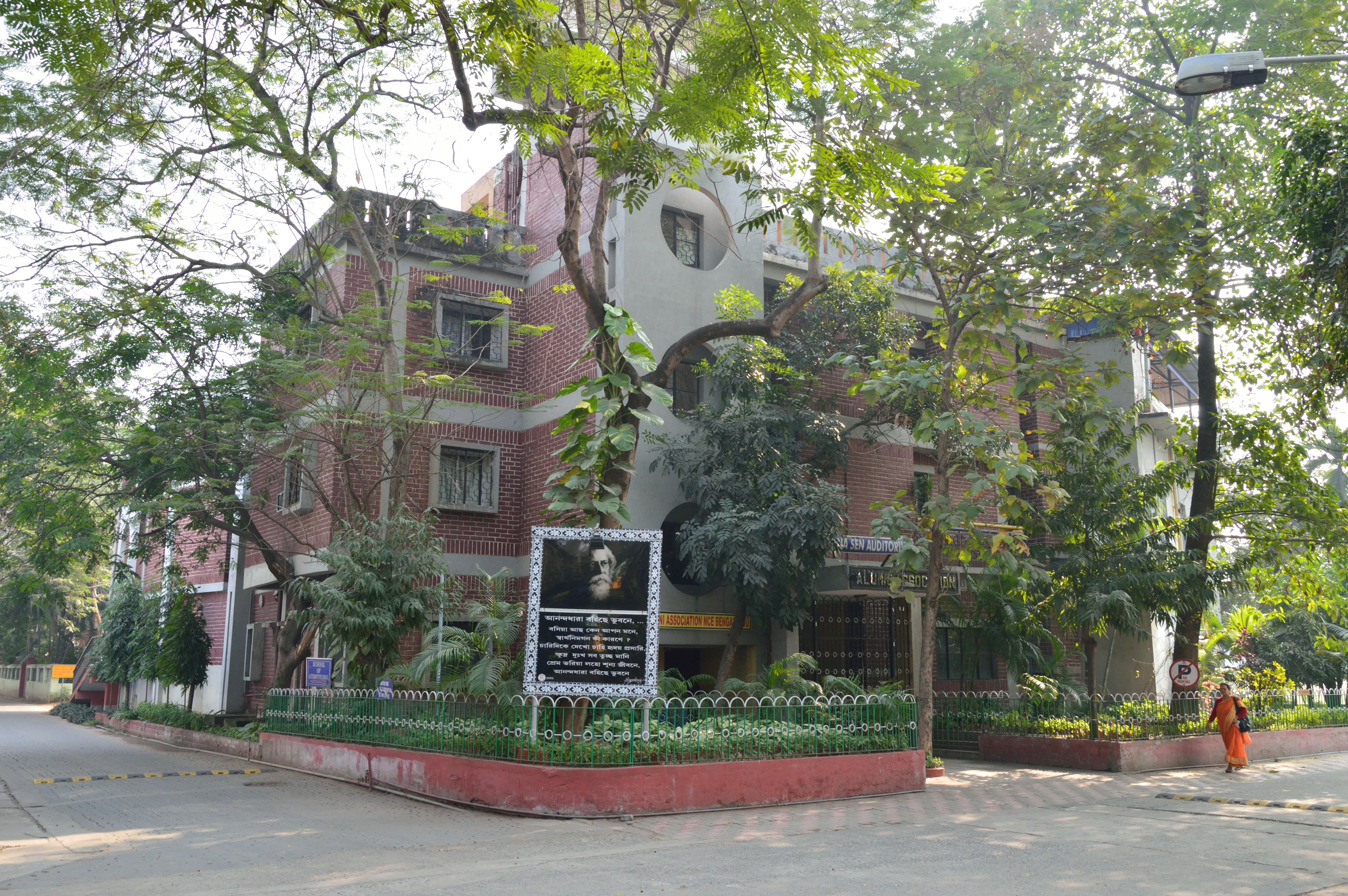
Alumni Association Building and Triguna Sen Auditorium, Jadavpur University, Kolkata

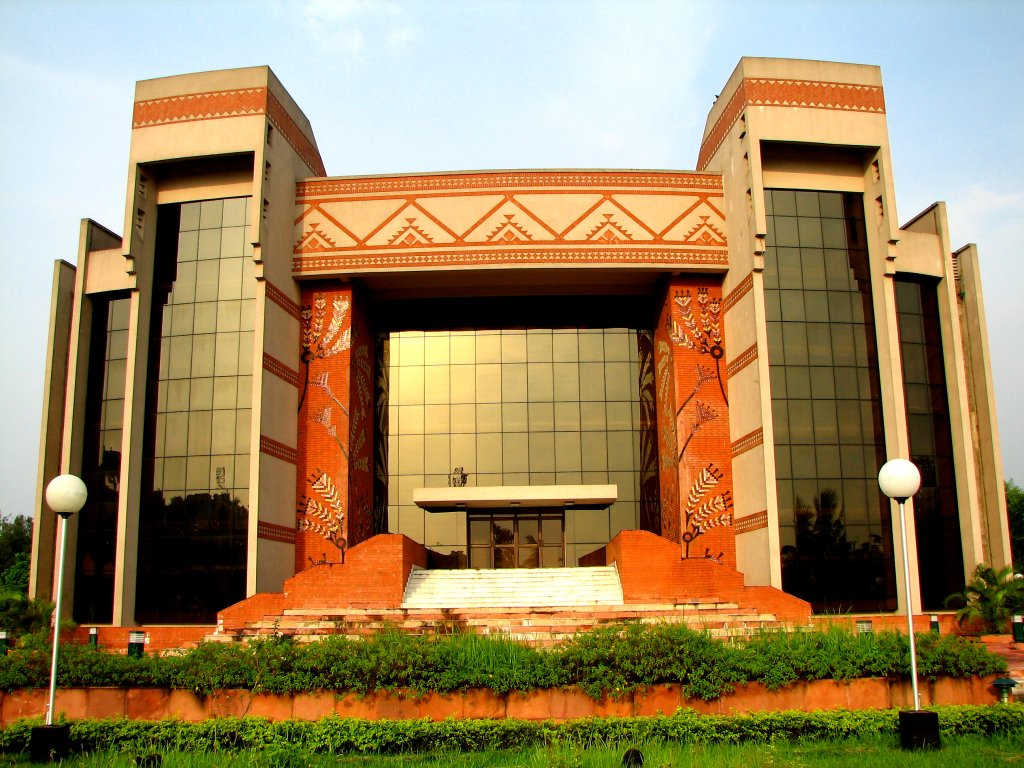
The Auditorium at Indian Institute of Management Calcutta

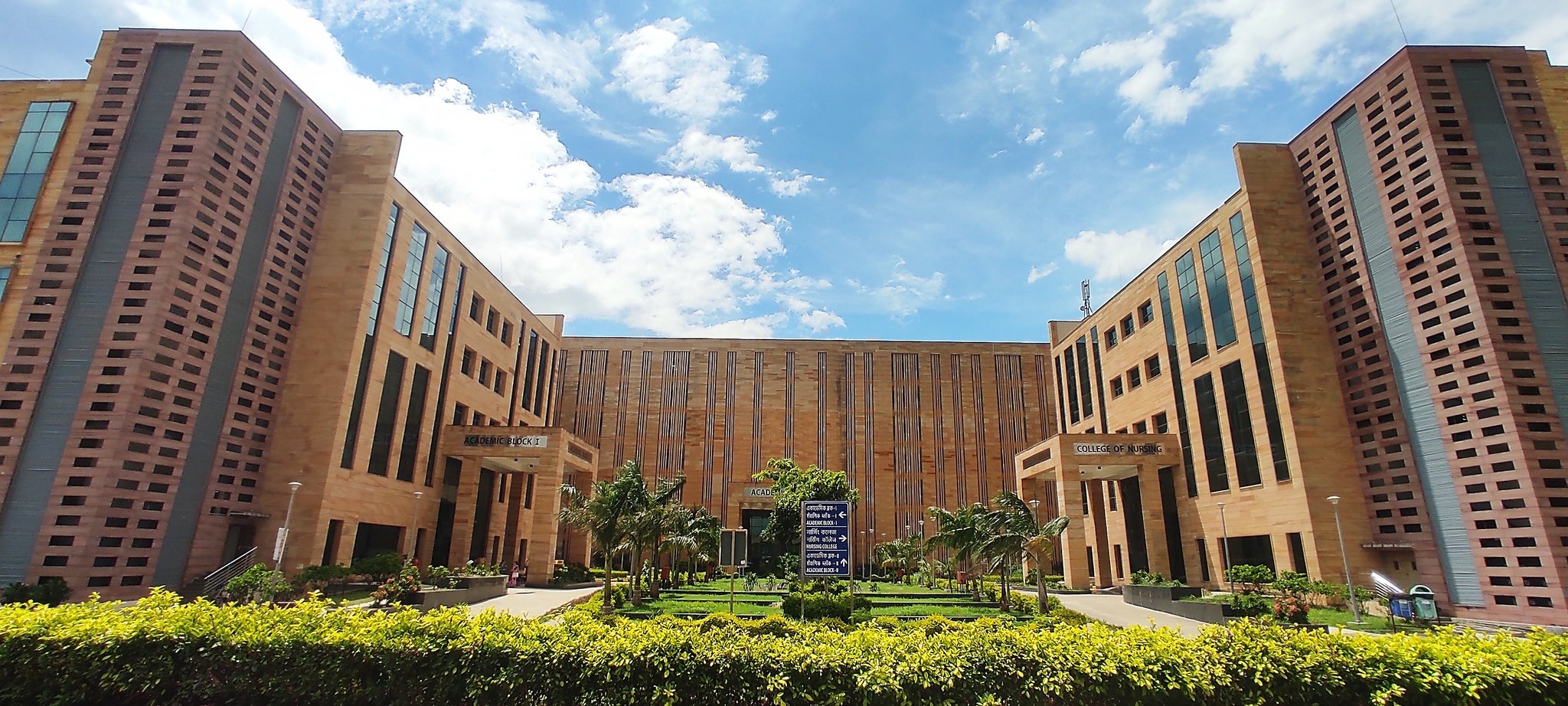
All India Institute of Medical Sciences, Kalyani

Other higher education institutes of importance in West Bengal include–St. Xavier's College, Indian Institute of Foreign Trade (IIFT), Indian Institute of Management Calcutta (the first IIM), Indian Institute of Science Education and Research, Kolkata (IISER), Indian Statistical Institute (ISI), Indian Institute of Technology Kharagpur (the first IIT), Indian Institute of Engineering Science and Technology, Shibpur (the first IIEST), Indian Institute of Information Technology, Kalyani (IIIT), Medical College, Kolkata, National Institute of Technology, Durgapur (NIT), National Institute of Technical Teachers' Training and Research, Kolkata (NITTTR), National Institute of Pharmaceutical Education and Research, Kolkata (NIPER), and West Bengal National University of Juridical Sciences (NUJS). In 2003, the state government supported the creation of West Bengal University of Technology (MAKAUT), West Bengal University of Health Sciences (WBUHS), West Bengal State University (WBSU), and Gour Banga University (UGB).

Jadavpur University (JU) (Focus area—Mobile Computing and Communication, and Nano-science), and the University of Calcutta (Modern Biology) are among two of the fifteen universities selected under the "University with Potential for Excellence" scheme. University of Calcutta (Focus Area—Electro-Physiological and Neuro-imaging studies including mathematical modelling) has also been selected under the "Centre with Potential for Excellence in a Particular Area" scheme.

In addition, the state is home to Kalyani University, The University of Burdwan, Vidyasagar University, and North Bengal University all well established and nationally renowned schools that cover education needs at the district level. Apart from this there is a Deemed university run by the Ramakrishna Mission named Ramakrishna Mission Vivekananda University (RKMVERI) at Belur Math.

Also there are several research institutes in Kolkata. The Indian Association for the Cultivation of Science (IACS) is the first research institute in Asia. C. V. Raman was awarded the Nobel Prize in 1930 for his discovery (Raman Effect) done at the IACS. The Bose Institute, Saha Institute of Nuclear Physics (SINP), S. N. Bose National Centre for Basic Sciences (SNBNCBS), Indian Institute of Chemical Biology (IICB), Central Glass and Ceramic Research Institute (CGCRI), Central Mechanical Engineering Research Institute (CMERI) Durgapur, Central Research Institute for Jute and Allied Fibers (CRIJAF), National Institute of Research on Jute and Allied Fibre Technology (NIRJAFT), Central Inland Fisheries Research Institute (CIFRI), National Institute of Biomedical Genomics (NIBMG) Kalyani, and the Variable Energy Cyclotron Centre (VECC) are the other significant institutions of the state.

Notable scholars who were born, worked, or studied in the geographic area of the state include physicists such as Satyendra Nath Bose, Meghnad Saha, and Jagadish Chandra Bose; chemist Prafulla Chandra Roy; statisticians Prasanta Chandra Mahalanobis and Anil Kumar Gain; physician Upendranath Brahmachari; educator Ashutosh Mukherjee; and Nobel laureates Rabindranath Tagore, C. V. Raman, Amartya Sen, and Abhijit Banerjee.

== Media ==
In 2005, West Bengal had a total of 505 published newspapers, of which 389 were in Bengali. Ananda Bazar Patrika, a daily published in Kolkata with 1,277,801 daily copies, has the largest circulation for a single-edition, regional language newspaper in India. Other major Bengali newspapers are: Bartaman, Ei Samay, Sangbad Pratidin, Aajkaal and Uttarbanga Sambad. Major English language newspapers include The Telegraph, The Times of India, Hindustan Times, The Hindu, The Statesman, The Indian Express and Asian Age. Some important financial dailies such as The Economic Times, Financial Express, Business Line and Business Standard are widely circulated. Vernacular newspapers such as those in Hindi, Nepali, Gujarati, Odia, Urdu and Punjabi also exist.

DD Bangla is the state-owned television broadcaster. Multi system operators provide a mix of Bengali, Nepali, Hindi, English and international channels via cable. Bengali 24-hour television news channels include ABP Ananda, News18 Bangla, Republic Bangla, Kolkata TV, News Time, Zee 24 Ghanta, TV9 Bangla, Calcutta News and Channel 10. All India Radio is a public radio station. Private FM stations are available only in cities like Kolkata, Siliguri, and Asansol. Vodafone Idea, Airtel, BSNL, Jio are all of the available cellular phone providers. Broadband Internet is available in select towns and cities, and is provided by the state-run BSNL and by other private companies. Dial-up access is also provided throughout the state by BSNL and other providers.

== Sports ==
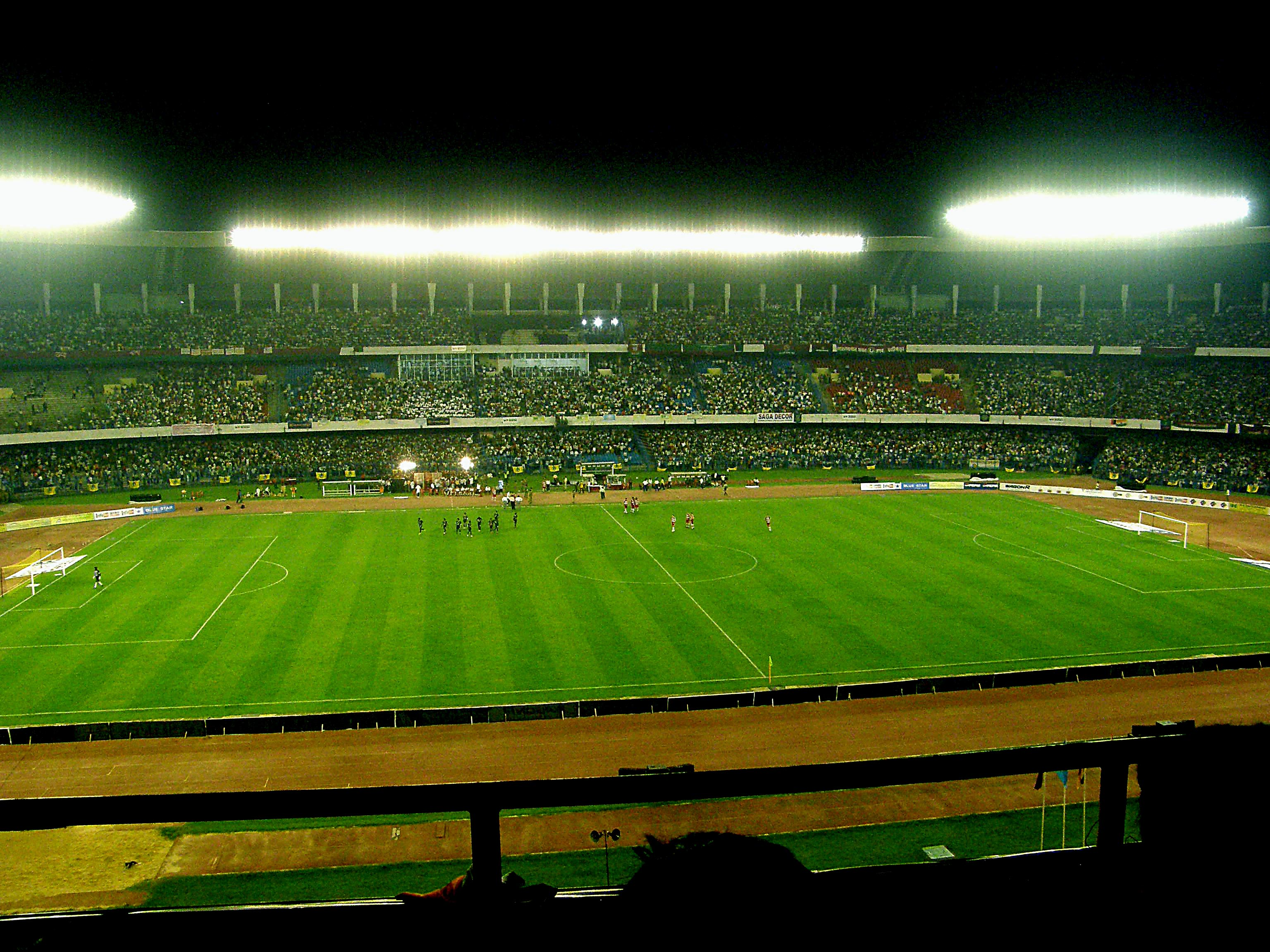
Salt Lake Stadium (Vivekananda Yuva Bharati Krirangan), Kolkata

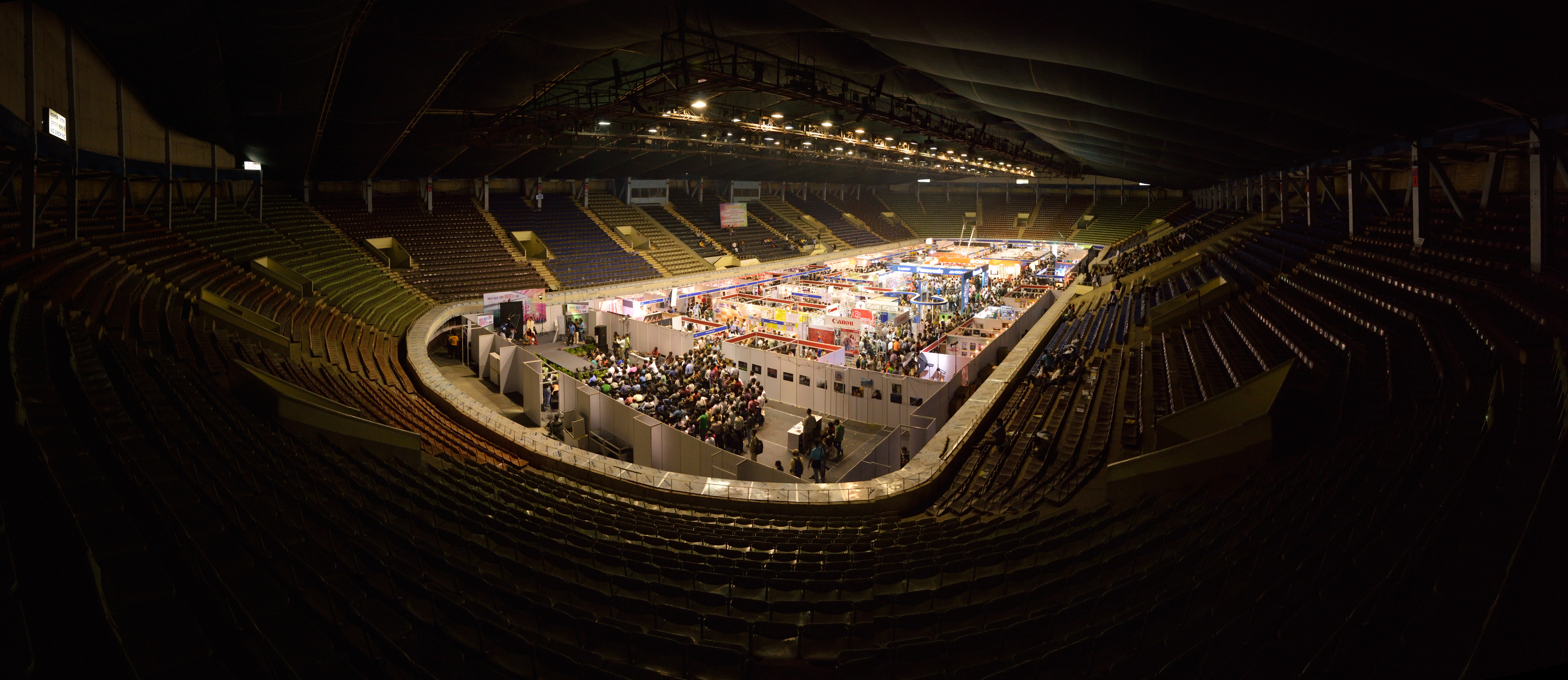
Netaji Indoor Stadium, Kolkata

Netaji Indoor Stadium was completed in January 1975 and was constructed specifically to host the 1975 World Table Tennis Championships, which were held at the venue that year. The stadium has also hosted other major events, including the state funeral service of Mother Teresa on 13 September 1997.

Cricket and association football are popular. West Bengal, unlike most other states of India, is noted for its passion and patronage of football. Kolkata is one of the major centres for football in India and houses top national clubs such as Mohun Bagan Super Giant, East Bengal Club and Mohammedan Sporting Club.

West Bengal has several large stadiums. Eden Gardens was one of only two 100,000-seat cricket stadiums in the world; renovations before the 2011 Cricket World Cup reduced the capacity to 66,000. The stadium is the home to various cricket teams such as the Kolkata Knight Riders, the Bengal cricket team and the East Zone. The 1987 Cricket World Cup final was hosted in Eden Gardens. The Calcutta Cricket and Football Club is the second-oldest cricket club in the world.

Vivekananda Yuba Bharati Krirangan (VYBK), is a multipurpose stadium in Kolkata, with a current capacity of 85,000. It is the largest stadium in India by seating capacity. Before its renovation in 2011, it was the second-largest football stadium in the world, having a seating capacity of 120,000. It has hosted many national and international sporting events like the 1987 SAF Games, and the 2011 FIFA friendly football match between Argentina and Venezuela, which feature Lionel Messi. In 2008, the German goalkeeper, Oliver Kahn played his farewell match on this ground. The stadium hosted the final match of the 2017 FIFA U-17 World Cup.

Notable sports persons from West Bengal include former Indian national cricket team captain, Sourav Ganguly; former Indian test cricketer, Pankaj Roy; Olympic tennis bronze medallist, Leander Paes; and chess grandmaster, Dibyendu Barua.

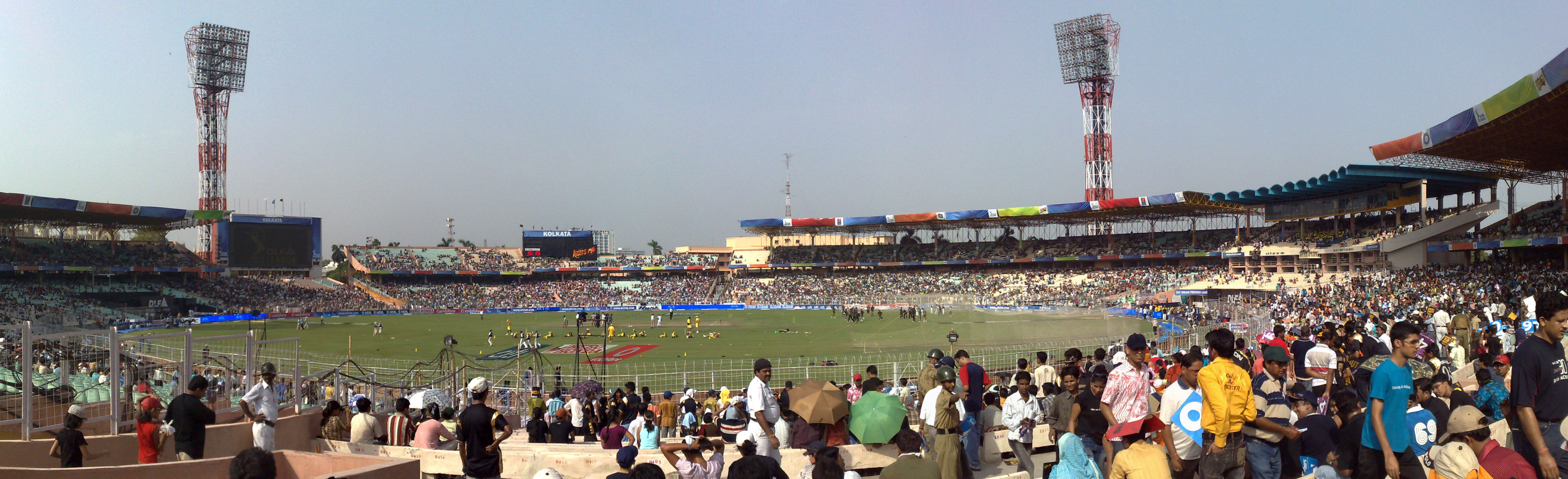
Panoramic view of the Eden Gardens Stadium during IPL 2008

== See also ==
- Bangal
- Bengali language movements in India
- Ghoti people
- List of people from West Bengal
- List of tourist attractions in West Bengal
- Outline of West Bengal

== Sources ==
- Arnold-Baker, Charles (30 July 2015). The Companion to British History. Taylor & Francis. ISBN 978-1-317-40039-4. Archived from the original on 2 February 2023.
- Bardhan, Kalpana (2010). The Oxford India Anthology of Bengali Literature: 1941–1991. Oxford University Press. ISBN 978-0-19-806461-9.
- Baxter, Craig (1997). Bangladesh: From a Nation to a State. Boulder, Colorado: Westview Press. ISBN 978-1-85984-121-1.
- Bayly, Christopher Alan (1987). Indian Society and the Making of the British Empire. Cambridge University Press. pp. 195, 196. ISBN 978-0-521-38650-0.
- Campbell, John; Watts, William (1760), "Memoirs of the Revolution in Bengal, Anno Domini 1757", World Digital Library, archived from the original on 24 December 2014
- Chakrabarty, Bidyut (2004). The Partition of Bengal and Assam, 1932–1947: Contour of Freedom. Routledge. ISBN 9781134332748. Archived from the original on 2 February 2023.
- Chandra, Bipan; Mukherjee, Mridula; Mukherjee, Aditya; Panikkar, K. N.; Mahajan, Sucheta (1989). India's Struggle for Independence. Penguin UK. ISBN 978-81-8475-183-3. Archived from the original on 2 February 2023.
- Datta, Amaresh (1988). Encyclopaedia of Indian Literature. Sahitya Akademi. ISBN 978-81-260-1194-0. Archived from the original on 2 February 2023.
- Gooptu, Sharmistha (November 2010). Bengali Cinema: 'An Other Nation'. Routledge. ISBN 978-1-136-91217-7.
- Gooptu, Sharmistha (17 April 2013). "'Bengali' cinema: Its making and unmaking". In Gokulsing, K. Moti; Dissanayake, Wimal (eds.). Routledge Handbook of Indian Cinemas. Routledge. ISBN 978-1-136-77284-9.
- Hindle, Jane, ed. (1996). London Review of Books: An Anthology. Foreword by Alan Bennett. London: Verso. pp. 63–70. ISBN 978-1-85984-121-1.
- Mukherjee, Soumyendra Nath (1987). Sir William Jones: A Study in Eighteenth-century British Attitudes to India. Cambridge University Press. ISBN 978-0-86131-581-9. Archived from the original on 14 December 2019.
- Sarkar, Sumit (1990). "Calcutta and the Bengal Renaissance". In Chaudhuri, Sukanta (ed.). Calcutta, the Living City: The past. Vol. 1. Oxford University Press. ISBN 9780195625851.
- Impact of Social Sector Development in West Bengal (Report). Planning Commission, Government of India. 2009. Archived from the original on 7 March 2012.
- West Bengal Human Development Report, 2004 (PDF) (Report). Kolkata: Development and Planning Department, Government of West Bengal. May 2004. ISBN 978-81-7955-030-4. Archived (PDF) from the original on 26 January 2018.
- "UNESCO World Heritage List". Whc.unesco.org. Archived from the original on 3 November 2018.
- Srivastava, Anshika; Singh, Prajjval Pratap; Bandopadhyay, Audditiya; Singh, Pooja; Das, Debashruti; Tamang, Rakesh; Chaubey, Akhilesh Kumar; Shrivastava, Pankaj; van Driem, George; Chaubey, Gyaneshwer (27 March 2020). "Genetic and linguistic non-correspondence suggests evidence for collective social climbing in the Kol tribe of South Asia". Scientific Reports. 10 (1): 5593. Bibcode:2020NatSR..10.5593S. doi:10.1038/s41598-020-61941-z. PMC 7101412. PMID 32221319.
