= Salient (geography) =

Elongated protrusion of a geopolitical entity

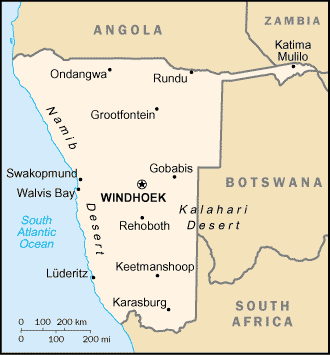
Map of Namibia showing the Caprivi Strip in the country's northeast.

A salient, panhandle, or bootheel is an elongated protrusion of a geopolitical entity, such as a subnational entity or a sovereign state.

While similar to a peninsula in shape, a salient is most often not surrounded by water on three sides. Instead, it has a land border on at least two sides and extends from the larger geographical body of the administrative unit.

In American English, the term panhandle is often used to describe a relatively long and narrow salient, such as the westernmost extensions of Florida and Oklahoma, or the northernmost portion of Idaho. Another term is bootheel, used for the Missouri Bootheel and New Mexico Bootheel areas.

== Origin ==
The term salient is derived from military salients. The term "panhandle" derives from the analogous part of a cooking pan, and its use is generally confined to North America.

The salient shape can be the result of arbitrarily drawn international or subnational boundaries, which serve to separate culturally unified peoples. These occurred, for instance, during European colonialisation when colonial powers competed for Africa and the Western Hemisphere, after which post-colonial borders became based on colonial divisions. In many cases these salients correspond to routes of expansion or bases for such expansion, as in Namibia and Mozambique. Other modern salients originally served to provide barriers against other colonial powers, as with Britain against Tsarist Russia in Central Asia.

Salients may also arise when a national government shifts territory between subnational entities for internal political reasons, as with West Virginia's eastern panhandle during the Civil War. This also occurred with peripheral Tibetan-inhabited regions in Maoist China, which were split between provinces and from the Tibet Autonomous Region.

The location of administrative borders can also take into account other considerations such as economic ties, strategic needs, history or topography. Even in these situations, however, salients frequently fail to follow clear and logical criteria, as seen with the partition of India and the resultant northeastern salient. Upon partition numerous majority-Muslim areas remained within Hindu India, and some non-Muslim-majority areas within the exclave of East Pakistan.

== Country-level salients ==
=== Africa ===
Far North Province of Cameroon

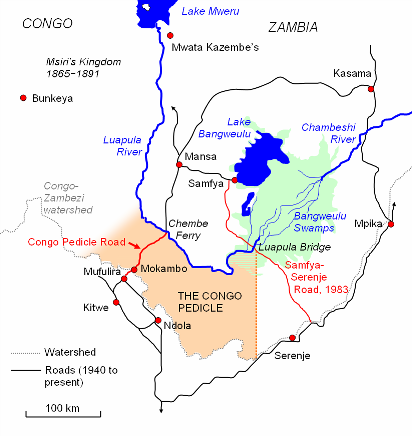
A map of the Congo Pedicle

| Salient | Country |
|---|---|
| Cibitoke Province | Burundi |
| Far North Region | Cameroon |
| Congo Pedicle | Democratic Republic of the Congo |
| Kongo Central | Democratic Republic of the Congo |
| Southern Red Sea Region | Eritrea |
| Gambela Region | Ethiopia |
| Somali Region | Ethiopia |
| Nimba County | Liberia |
| Nsanje District | Malawi |
| Kayes Region | Mali |
| Azawad | Mali |
| Tete Province | Mozambique |
| Caprivi Strip | Namibia |
| Casamance | Senegal |
| Somaliland | Somalia |
| Kalahari Gemsbok National Park | South Africa |
| Upper Nile | South Sudan |
| Blue Nile | Sudan |
| Wadi Halfa Salient | Sudan |
| Kagera Region | Tanzania |
| Cinkassé Prefecture | Togo |

=== Asia ===
Chittagong Division, Bangladesh

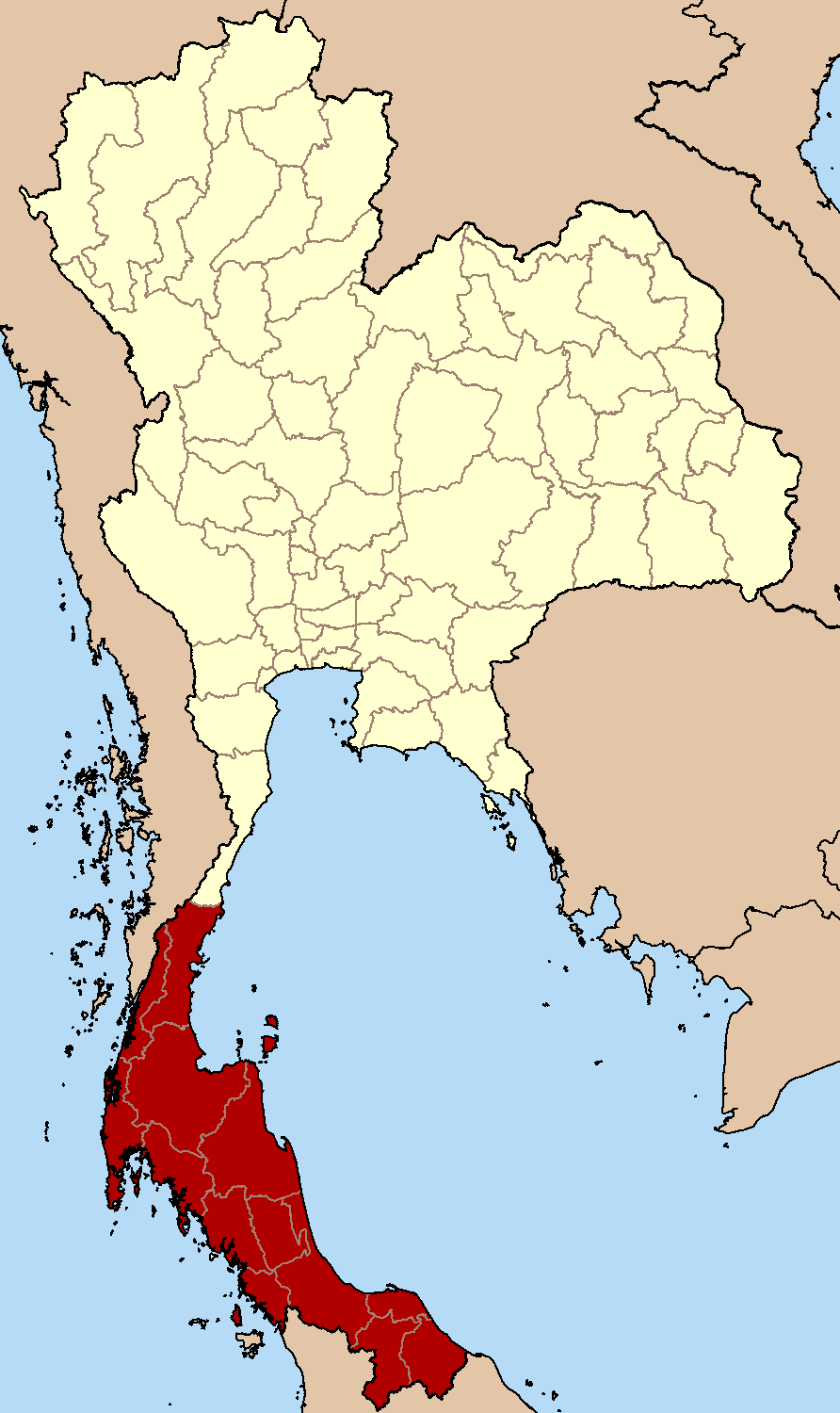
The 14 provinces of Thailand forming the salient of Southern Thailand.

| Salient | Country |
|---|---|
| Wakhan Corridor | Afghanistan |
| Chittagong | Bangladesh |
| Rangpur | Bangladesh |
| Sylhet | Bangladesh |
| Western Belait District | Brunei |
| Parrot's Beak | Cambodia |
| Northeast China | China |
| Yadong County (Tibet Autonomous Region) | China |
| West Timor | Indonesia |
| Jerusalem corridor | Israel |
| Galilee panhandle | Israel |
| Mafraq Governorate | Jordan |
| Mangystau Region | Kazakhstan |
| Batken | Kyrgyzstan |
| Phongsaly Province | Laos |
| Houaphanh province | Laos |
| Tfail Salient | Lebanon |
| Myanmar Panhandle (Kayin State, Mon State and Tanintharyi Region) | Myanmar |
| Puta-O District | Myanmar |
| Maungdaw District | Myanmar |
| Mong Yawng Township | Myanmar |
| Rason,North Hamgyŏng, South Hamgyŏng and Ryanggang | North Korea |
| Primorsky Krai | Russia |
| Sol-Iletsky District | Russia |
| Sughd | Tajikistan |
| Southern Thailand | Thailand |
| Aralık, Iğdır Province | Turkey |
| Hatay Province | Turkey |
| Tashkent Region | Uzbekistan |
| Fergana and Andijan Regions | Uzbekistan |
| Namangan | Uzbekistan |
| Tashkent City | Uzbekistan |
| Jizzakh Region | Uzbekistan |
| Sirdaryo Region | Uzbekistan |
| Surxondaryo Region | Uzbekistan |
| Nghệ An Province | Vietnam |

=== Europe ===
County Donegal within Ireland, in darker green

Limburg shown within the Netherlands

Bryansk Oblast within Russia

| Salient | Country |
|---|---|
| Syunik | Armenia |
| Tyrol and Vorarlberg | Austria |
| West Flanders | Belgium |
| Tamashowka | Belarus |
| Neum | Bosnia and Herzegovina |
| Vidin Province | Bulgaria |
| Dalmatia | Croatia |
| Ilok | Croatia |
| Louroujina Salient | Cyprus |
| Aš administrative district | Czech Republic |
| Šluknov Hook | Czech Republic |
| Laatre, Viljandi County | Estonia |
| Enontekiö | Finland |
| Ain (around the border of Switzerland) | France |
| Charleville-Mézières | France |
| Berchtesgadener Land | Germany |
| Kakheti | Georgia |
| Sagiada | Greece |
| Western Thrace | Greece |
| Felsőszölnök | Hungary |
| Sopron | Hungary |
| County Donegal | Ireland |
| County Monaghan | Ireland |
| Province of Trieste | Italy |
| Ricciolo d'Italia | Italy |
| Dragash | Kosovo |
| Dieveniškės appendix | Lithuania |
| Castelré, North Brabant | Netherlands |
| Limburg | Netherlands |
| Pasvikdalen valley | Norway |
| Gmina Bogatynia | Poland |
| Gmina Lutowiska | Poland |
| Kłodzko County | Poland |
| Melgaço and north of Monção and Arcos de Valdevez (Viana do Castelo District) | Portugal |
| Tourém in north of Montalegre (Vila Real District) | Portugal |
| Miranda do Douro, Mogadouro and Vimioso (Bragança District) | Portugal |
| Moura and eastern Barrancos (Beja District) and Mourão (Évora District) | Portugal |
| Alexandrovo-Gaysky District | Russia |
| Bryansk Oblast Southern Russia | Russia |
| Bor District | Serbia |
| Jamena | Serbia |
| Slovene Istria | Slovenia |
| Prekmurje | Slovenia |
| Galicia | Spain |
| Canton of Geneva | Switzerland |
| Canton of Schaffhausen | Switzerland |
| Bernina, Inn, Lugano, Mendrisio and Porrentruy Districts | Switzerland |
| Budjak | Ukraine |
| Talove, Shchastia Raion | Ukraine |
| County Fermanagh | United Kingdom |

=== South America ===
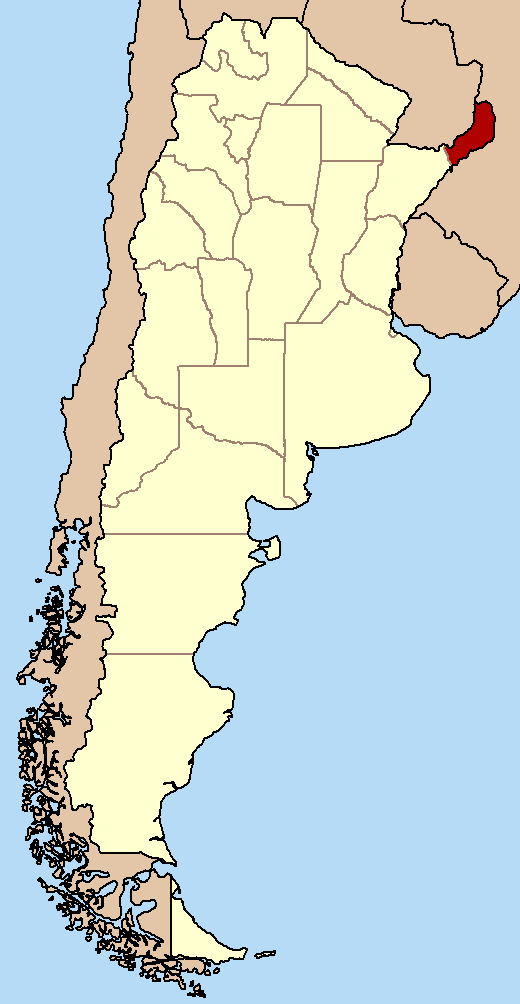
Misiones Province within Argentina

| Salient | Country |
|---|---|
| Misiones | Argentina |
| Leticia Trapeze | Colombia |
| Southeast Guainía Department (La Guadalupe/San Felipe) | Colombia |
| Yavaraté, Vaupés Department | Colombia |
| Tumbes Region | Peru |
| Amazonas | Venezuela |

=== North America ===
| Salient | Country |
|---|---|
| Southeast Alaska | United States |
| New England | United States |
| South Texas | United States |
| Southern Ontario (particularly Ontario Peninsula) | Canada |
| Tatshenshini-Alsek Park, British Columbia | Canada |
| Madawaska County, New Brunswick | Canada |
| Petén Department | Guatemala |

== Subnational salients ==
The following locations are salients in first-level administrative subdivisions of nations.

=== Africa ===
Location of Niari Department within the Republic of the Congo. The southeastern arm is the Kimongo District.

Location of the Fatick Region within Senegal. Gossas Department is the northeastern arm.

| Salient | Country |
|---|---|
| Tafraoui and Oran Province | Algeria |
| Southwestern Saïda Province | Algeria |
| Northeastern Bié Province | Angola |
| Western Mono Department | Benin |
| Eastern Kgalagadi District | Botswana |
| Balé Province and Boucle du Mouhoun Region | Burkina Faso |
| Kouritenga Province, Centre-Est Region | Burkina Faso |
| Northwest Bujumbura Rural Province | Burundi |
| Northern Muyinga Province | Burundi |
| Kimongo District, Niari Department | Republic of the Congo |
| Northwestern Wele-Nzas Province | Equatorial Guinea |
| Sitti Zone, Somali Region | Ethiopia |
| Haut-Komo Department, Woleu-Ntem Province | Gabon |
| Upper Denkyira West District, Central Region | Ghana |
| Télimélé Prefecture, Kindia Region | Guinea |
| Northeast Mamou Prefecture, Mamou Region | Guinea |
| Western Isiolo County | Kenya |
| Eastern Al Wahat District | Libya |
| Southern Mzimba District, Northern Region | Malawi |
| Eastern Dakhlet Nouadhibou Region | Mauritania |
| Boumdeid Department, Assaba Region | Mauritania |
| Southeastern Tete Province | Mozambique |
| Gossas Department, Fatick Region | Senegal |
| Southern Uvinza District, Kigoma Region | Tanzania |
| Babati, Hanang, Mbulu Districts, Manyara Region | Tanzania |
| Gokwe North and Gokwe South Districts, Midlands Province | Zimbabwe |

=== South America ===
Guayas Province, Ecuador. Balzar and El Empalme Cantons form the northern arm of the province.

Venezuela's Barinas State. Andrés Eloy Blanco is the small western extension of the state, Arismendi is the larger eastern extremity. Páez, in Apure, lies immediately to the south of western Barinas.

| Salient | Country |
|---|---|
| Southern Buenos Aires Province | Argentina |
| Luis Calvo, Chuquisaca Department | Bolivia |
| Sud Cinti, Chuquisaca Department | Bolivia |
| Whale Coast, Bahia | Brazil |
| Alto Parnaíba, Balsas, and Tasso Fragoso, southernmost Maranhão | Brazil |
| Bico do Papagaio, Tocantins | Brazil |
| Northern Mato Grosso | Brazil |
| Ponta do Abunã in northwest Rondônia | Brazil |
| Triângulo Mineiro, Minas Gerais | Brazil |
| Arauco Province, Bío Bío Region | Chile |
| San Antonio Province, Valparaíso Region | Chile |
| Urabá region, Antioquia Department | Colombia |
| Unguía and Acandí in northernmost Chocó Department | Colombia |
| Santander Department northern tip | Colombia |
| Santa Rosa and Piamonte in southeastern Cauca Department | Colombia |
| Cotacachi Canton, Imbabura Province | Ecuador |
| Western Cumandá Canton | Ecuador |
| Eastern Tena Canton, Napo Province | Ecuador |
| Balzar and El Empalme Cantons, Guayas Province | Ecuador |
| Northern East Berbice-Corentyne | Guyana |
| Caravelí Province, Arequipa Region | Peru |
| Northern Tapanahony, Sipaliwini District | Suriname |
| Páez, Apure | Venezuela |
| Western Andrés Eloy Blanco Municipality, Barinas | Venezuela |
| Arismendi Municipality, Barinas | Venezuela |
| Guajira Municipality, Zulia | Venezuela |

=== North and Central America ===
| Salient | Country |
|---|---|
| Toronto (East York, Etobicoke, Old Toronto, York) | Canada |
| Northwestern British Columbia | Canada |
| Middle Côte-Nord, Quebec | Canada |
| Labrador West, Newfoundland and Labrador | Canada |
| Western Puntarenas Province | Costa Rica |
| Guamá, Santiago de Cuba Province | Cuba |
| Southern Hato Mayor Province | Dominican Republic |
| Southern Samaná Province | Dominican Republic |
| Southern San Miguel Department | El Salvador |
| Norte, Jalisco | Mexico |
| Eastern Tabasco | Mexico |
| Western Tamaulipas | Mexico |
| Southeastern Zacatecas | Mexico |
| Southern Zacatecas | Mexico |
| Chiriquí Grande District, Bocas del Toro Province | Panama |
| Southern Chimán District, Panamá Province | Panama |
| Mariato District, Veraguas Province | Panama |
| Southeast Alaska | United States |
| Connecticut Panhandle | United States |
| Florida Panhandle (Note: This definition includes the following counties: Bay, Calhoun, Escambia, Franklin, Gadsden, Gulf, Holmes, Jackson, Jefferson, Leon, Liberty, Madison, Okaloosa, Santa Rosa, Taylor, Wakulla, Walton, and Washington.) | United States |
| Idaho Panhandle | United States |
| Western Maryland (Note: This definition includes the following counties: Allegany, Frederick, Garrett, and Washington) | United States |
| Nebraska Panhandle | United States |
| Oklahoma Panhandle | United States |
| Texas Panhandle | United States |
| Eastern West Virginia | United States |
| Missouri Bootheel | United States |
| Northern West Virginia | United States |
| New Mexico Bootheel | United States |
| Trans-Pecos | United States |

Locations of panhandles within states of the USA

=== Asia ===
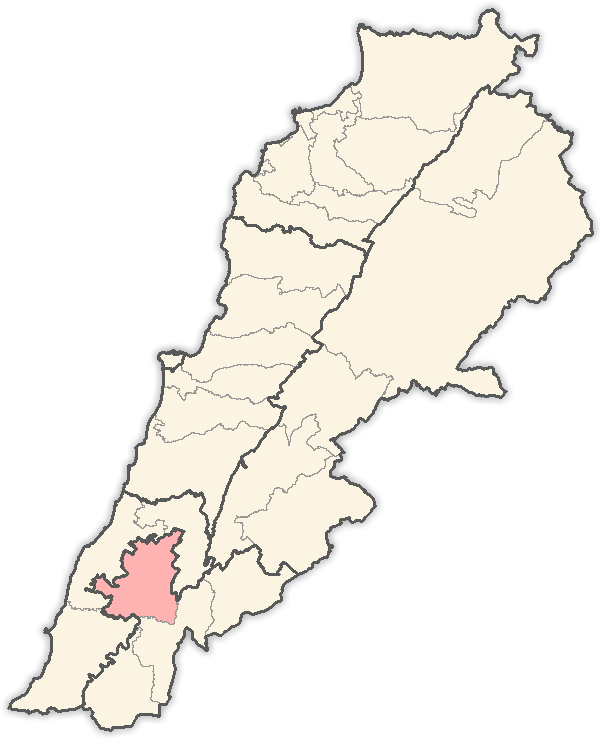
Location of Nabatieh District within Nabatieh Governorate, Lebanon.

Map of Gorno-Badakhshan within Tajikistan, showing the panhandle of Darvoz District in the west.

South Sulawesi in Indonesia, with a panhandle of East Luwu Regency in the east

| Salient | Country |
|---|---|
| Wakhan District, Badakhshan Province | Afghanistan |
| Nawa District, Ghazni Province | Afghanistan |
| Chishti Sharif District, Herat Province | Afghanistan |
| Eastern Sarpang District | Bhutan |
| Tianchang, Anhui | China |
| Maqu County, Gansu | China |
| Fan County and Taiqian County, Henan | China |
| Pingliang and Qingyang, Gansu | China |
| Daxing'anling Prefecture, Heilongjiang | China |
| Zhaotong, Yunnan | China |
| Uttarandhra region of Andhra Pradesh | India |
| Southern Jhansi division of Uttar Pradesh | India |
| North Bengal division of West Bengal | India |
| Wonogiri Regency, Central Java | Indonesia |
| Pacitan Regency, East Java | Indonesia |
| Mahakam Ulu Regency, East Kalimantan | Indonesia |
| South Jakarta, Jakarta Special Capital Region, and Depok, West Java | Indonesia |
| Tabalong Regency, South Kalimantan | Indonesia |
| East Luwu Regency, South Sulawesi | Indonesia |
| Ogan Komering Ilir Regency, South Sumatra | Indonesia |
| Pasaman Regency, West Sumatra | Indonesia |
| Semirom County, Isfahan Province | Iran |
| Southwest Razavi Khorasan Province | Iran |
| Southern Yazd Province | Iran |
| Fukushima Prefecture salient, Kitakata, Fukushima | Japan |
| Noda, Chiba | Japan |
| Nose, Osaka | Japan |
| Ōra District, Gunma | Japan |
| Reinan(Wakasa), Fukui | Japan |
| Wadi Araba Department, Aqaba Governorate | Jordan |
| Russeifa Department, Zarqa Governorate | Jordan |
| Southwest Panfilov District, Chuy Region | Kyrgyzstan |
| Chong-Alay District, Osh Region | Kyrgyzstan |
| Nabatieh District, Nabatieh Governorate | Lebanon |
| Bandar Baharu District, Kedah, | Malaysia |
| Northeast of Kuantan District, Eastern Pahang | Malaysia |
| South of Kemaman District, Terengganu | Malaysia |
| Gangaw Township, Magway Region | Myanmar |
| Thabeikkyin District, Mandalay Region | Myanmar |
| Eastern Achham District, Far-Western Region | Nepal |
| Western Surkhet District, Mid-Western Region | Nepal |
| Bannu, Karak, and Kohat Divisions, Khyber Pakhtunkhwa, | Pakistan |
| Tiwi, Albay | Philippines |
| Northernmost portion of barangay San Isidro, Cainta, Rizal | Philippines |
| Northwestern Cagayan | Philippines |
| Libis/Reparo, Santa Quiteria and Talipapa of southern Caloocan | Philippines |
| Carmona, Cavite | Philippines |
| Northeastern Ilocos Sur (roughly corresponding to its 1st district), | Philippines |
| Barangays Casile and Pittland, Cabuyao, Laguna | Philippines |
| Santa Maria, Laguna | Philippines |
| Las Piñas (Almanza Dos) | Philippines |
| Eastern Maguindanao del Sur, Philippines (municipalities east of Sultan sa Barongis) | Philippines |
| Carranglan, Nueva Ecija | Philippines |
| Alfonso Castañeda, southern Dupax del Norte and Dupax del Sur, Nueva Vizcaya | Philippines |
| Eastern Sultan Kudarat (roughly corresponding to its 1st district, excluding Isulan) | Philippines |
| San Manuel, Tarlac | Philippines |
| Zakamensky, Tunkinsky and Okinsky Districts, Buryatia | Russia |
| Katangsky District, Irkutsk Oblast | Russia |
| Kirensky, Mamsko-Chuysky and Bodaybinsky Districts, Irkutsk Oblast | Russia |
| Bikinsky District, Khabarovsk Krai | Russia |
| Trincomalee District, Eastern Province | Sri Lanka |
| Al-Suqaylabiyah District, Hama Governorate | Syria |
| Chenggong and Changbin townships, Taitung County | Taiwan |
| Darvoz District, Gorno-Badakhshan Autonomous Region | Tajikistan |
| Kim Sơn District, Ninh Bình Province | Vietnam |
| Nghi Xuân District, Hà Tĩnh Province | Vietnam |
| Western Dhamar Governorate | Yemen |

=== Europe ===
Location of Viken, Norway. The municipalities of Jevnaker and Lunner connect the former counties of Akershus and Buskerud

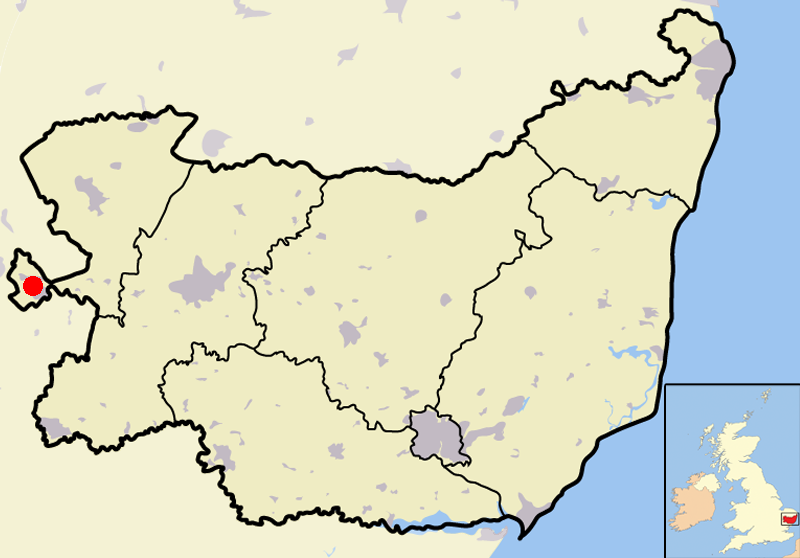
Location of Newmarket (shown as red dot) within Suffolk, England

Location of Manche within Normandy, France

| Salient | Country |
|---|---|
| Southern Gmunden, Upper Austria | Austria |
| Pancharevo, Sofia City Province | Bulgaria |
| Kuhmoinen, Pirkanmaa | Finland |
| Parikkala, South Karelia | Finland |
| Pudasjärvi-Taivalkoski-Kuusamo, North Ostrobothnia | Finland |
| Ruokolahti, South Karelia | Finland |
| Varkaus, Pohjois-Savo | Finland |
| Gironde, (panhandle is around the Gironde estuary) | France |
| Drôme (Montfroc) | France |
| Hauts-de-Seine | France |
| Meurthe-et-Moselle | France |
| Manche | France |
| Lower Franconia, Bavaria | Germany |
| Amt Neuhaus, District of Lüneburg, Lower Saxony | Germany |
| Osnabrück District and City, Lower Saxony | Germany |
| Altenburger Land, Thuringia | Germany |
| Southeastern Mureș County | Romania |
| Southeastern Győr-Moson-Sopron County | Hungary |
| Northern Pest County | Hungary |
| Clonlisk, County Offaly | Ireland |
| Tullyhaw, County Cavan | Ireland |
| Province of Rieti, Lazio | Italy |
| Raseiniai District Municipality, Kaunas County | Lithuania |
| Rivierenland, Gelderland | Netherlands |
| Steenwijkerland, Overijssel | Netherlands |
| Viken | Norway |
| Wschowa County, Lubusz Voivodeship | Poland |
| Mourão, Évora District | Portugal |
| Mozdoksky District, North Ossetia–Alania | Russia |
| Priyutnensky, Yashaltinsky, and Gorodovikovsky Districts, Kalmykia | Russia |
| Western Chelyabinsk Oblast (Note: Encompassing, in order of increasing distance from the main body of the oblast, Kusinsky District, Zlatoust Urban Okrug, Satkinsky District, Tryokhgorny Urban Okrug, Katav-Ivanovsky District, Ust-Katav Urban Okrug and Ashinsky District.) | Russia |
| Oparinsky, Podosinovsky, and Luzsky Districts, Kirov Oblast | Russia |
| Vorkuta District, Komi Republic | Russia |
| Negueira de Muñiz, Galicia (Spain) | Spain |
| Aranjuez, Madrid (Spain) | Spain |
| A Mezquita, Galicia | Spain |
| Diessenhofen, Schlatt bei Diessenhofen, and Basadingen-Schlattingen, Frauenfeld District, Thurgau | Switzerland |
| Monthey District, Valais | Switzerland |
| Buckfastleigh, Teignbridge | United Kingdom |
| Ceiriog Valley, Wrexham County Borough, Wales | United Kingdom |
| Maelor Saesneg, Wrexham County Borough, Wales | United Kingdom |
| Western New Forest District, Hampshire | United Kingdom |
| Newmarket, Suffolk | United Kingdom |
| North Cornwall, Cornwall | United Kingdom |
| Stamford, Lincolnshire | United Kingdom |
| South Staffordshire, Staffordshire | United Kingdom |
| The area around Tring, Hertfordshire, which is itself bounded on one side by a salient of Buckinghamshire in the area around Pitstone, Ivinghoe and Dagnall | United Kingdom |
| Ljig, Kolubara District | Serbia |
| Ljubovija, Mačva District | Serbia |
| Bosnian-Podrinje Canton Goražde, Federation of Bosnia and Herzegovina | Bosnia and Herzegovina |
| Petrovo, Republika Srpska | Bosnia and Herzegovina |
| Ravno, Herzegovina-Neretva Canton | Bosnia and Herzegovina |

=== Oceania ===
Location of Anetan District within Nauru

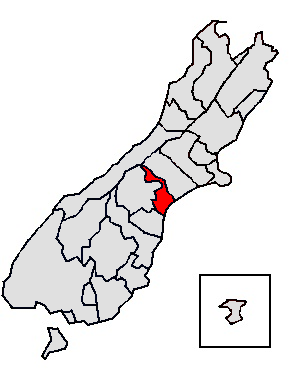
Location of Timaru District within New Zealand's South Island. The Waitaki District is parallel with it, a little further south.

| Salient | Country |
|---|---|
| Northeastern Nadroga-Navosa Province, Western Division | Fiji |
| Southern Anetan District | Nauru |
| Rangitaiki River Valley, Bay of Plenty Region | New Zealand |
| Hunter River Valley, Otago region | New Zealand |
| Upper Rangitata Valley, Timaru District | New Zealand |
| Upper Waitaki Valley, Waitaki District | New Zealand |
| Northeastern West New Britain Province | Papua New Guinea |

== See also ==
- Bootheel
- Border irregularities of the United States
- Border
- Chicken's neck (disambiguation)
- Corridor (disambiguation)
- Enclave and exclave
- Fergana Valley (triple junction of Uzbekistan, Kyrgyzstan and Tajikistan)
- Gerrymandering
- Political geography
- Salients, re-entrants and pockets
- The Thumb
