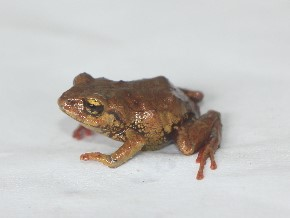

Conservation status
- Least Concern (IUCN 3.1)

Scientific classification
- Kingdom: Animalia
- Phylum: Chordata
- Class: Amphibia
- Order: Anura
- Family: Strabomantidae
- Genus: Pristimantis
- Subgenus: Pristimantis
- Species: P. leptolophus

Binomial name
- Pristimantis leptolophus (Lynch, 1980)

Synonyms
- Eleutherodactylus leptolophus Lynch, 1980

= Pristimantis leptolophus =

Species of frog

Pristimantis leptolophus is a species of frog in the family Strabomantidae. It is endemic to Colombia and known from the páramos of the Colombian Massif and Cordillera Central in the departments of Cauca and Huila. The specific name leptolophus is derived from Greek leptos ("thin") and lophos ("crest") and refers to the low dorsolateral folds of this frog. Common name volcano robber frog has been coined for it.

== Description ==
Adult males measure 14–18 mm (0.55–0.71 in) and adult females 21–25 mm (0.83–0.98 in) in snout–vent length. The snout is short, ovoid to subacuminate in dorsal view and rounded in lateral view. The tympanum is distinct, with raised annulus, although it is partly obscured by the supra-tympanic fold. Skin of the dorsum is smooth but has numerous low warts and short, low ridges. Both the fingers and the toes bear discs and lateral fringes. Preserved specimens have pale brown dorsum with darker brown markings (bars). The flanks have brown blotches.

== Habitat and conservation ==
Pristimantis leptolophus occurs in páramos and cloud forests at elevations of 2,400–3,300 m (7,900–10,800 ft) above sea level. The species is active by night on vegetation as high as 1 metre above the ground, whereas during the day specimens can be found under rocks and logs on very humid soils.

This species is very common and is not known to face significant threats. Its range includes the Nevado del Huila and Puracé National Natural Parks.
