= San Juan de Villalobos =

Village in Colombia

- Populated center

- Location within Colombia
- Coordinates: 1°29′52.1″N 76°22′32″W
- Country: Colombia
- Department: Cauca
- Municipality: Santa Rosa

Population
  - Total: 1,318 (2,009)

San Juan de Villalobos is a populated center of Colombia in the south of the department of Cauca in the region known as Media Bota Caucana, municipality of Santa Rosa. The town was settled in 1937 along National Route 45 at a distance of 8 km from the border between the departments of Huila and Cauca. This town is an obligatory passage between Pitalito and Mocoa and has gained relevance after the construction of National Route 45.

== History ==
San Juan de Villalobos is a town of settlers who came to the area mostly from the Caqueta, Huila and Putumayo departments attracted by the timber wealth. The history of the settlement dates back to 1932 when a family named Villalobos entered the area motivated by the extraction of wood. Through this inhospitable place they made their way from Pitalito (Huila) entering the virgin jungle using axes and machetes. Following the largest and mightiest river they were able to open a path and decided to name it with their name. Starting in 1935, motivated by the history of the Villalobos, the first settlers began to arrive and improvised their homes with plastic and boards that they sawed themselves with the aim of exploiting the timber wealth of the place. The inhabitants transported their market on muleback and on foot. In mid-1937, the first hamlet named Santo Domingo was formed, located 5 kilometers from La Línea (or “El Cable”), a bordering place between the departments of Huila and Cauca. . The houses were built with scraps of wood that they sold, they were tiled with straw roofs, which were rustic cardboard that served as Eternit tiles, and the floor was made of dirt.

By 1948 the population had increased considerably as a result of the beginning of the construction of sections of the highway that would connect Pitalito with Mocoa, in the department of Putumayo. In response to constant fights between the inhabitants, a police station was established with 7 active uniformed officers, under the command of Don Pedro Marín, a resident of Santo Domingo, as police inspector. As the construction of the road progressed, new hamlets or villages were also formed, which is how in 1953 the La Petrolera village was founded, 10 kilometers from Santo Domingo. Constructions were established on both sides of the road with a distance of approximately one kilometer per property. In La Petrolera they founded the school with the same name in 1955 and its first teacher was Alicia Castaño Molina 7 kilometers from La Petrolera, the Santa María village was founded in 1958. The school was founded the following year under the leadership of Professor Carlina Hernández. This path was 6 kilometers long with houses far from each other. In 1960, the Capuchin missionary of Spanish origin, Fray Isidore de Montclar, arrived in the region from the Apostolic Vicariate of Sibundoy in the neighboring department of Putumayo.

Fray Montclar had a fundamental impact on the development and knowledge of the area. He ordered and was in charge of building the schools in cement material or adobes manufactured by himself. In the following years and with the progress of the highway, the San Eduardo, Las Palmeras and San Juan villages were founded in 1967. For 19 years the construction of the road was stopped, facilitating the settlement in San Juan. This last village has stood out for its population since its founding. Geographically, it is located in the middle of the road to Mocoa, which is why it functions as a midpoint between the population that lives in the lower area and the upper area of Media Bota Caucana The San Juan school was founded by teacher Aura Helena Ordóñez in 1968. In 1969, the Redemptorist Father José Restrepo López arrived in the region, through the agreement called 'Contract of National Schools, the schools belonged to the Vicariate of Sibundoy at that time. He was appointed as parish priest of San Juan and as school inspector for the area. Under the leadership of this priest there were great advances in the region. Due to his profession as a cartographer, he managed to prepare the map of the Municipality of Santa Rosa, highlighting the regions of Villalobos, Mandiyaco (Yanacona de Santa Martha indigenous reservation) and Descanse.

Using a map Montclar got attention in Popayán, capital of the department, and made the territory have government recognition. In addition to national funds, he raised economic resources from Germany for the construction of churches and schools. With these resources, the churches of Santa María and San Juan were built, and a vehicle was also purchased to transport between paths and carry out masses. He also created school restaurants. Father Restrepo López also organized the Community Action Boards in each village and guided them in achieving their legal status in the Secretariat of the Government of Cauca in Popayán. He had the Santa María and San Juan aqueducts built, with help managed from the Cauca Public Health Institute. Starting in 1987, he founded the towns of Sajonia, Buenos Aires and Betania located between San Juan and the bridge over the Villalobos River, bordering the Mandiyaco sector. He helped the separation of some population that lived in the La Petrolera village and created the La Quebradona village, with its respective school built in material, the first teacher was Alicia Castaño Molina. Father Restrepo López also founded the police inspection of San Juan and before having a building yet he appointed Salomón Silva (the oldest resident of Villalobos) as inspector.

In subsequent years, two more trails were created: La Esmeralda, which emerges from the upper part of Santa María, and La Florida, which emerges from the lower part. In the direction of Pitalito – Mocoa the paths are entirely: Santo Domingo, La Petrolera, La Quebradona, La Esmeralda, Santa María, La Florida, San Eduardo, Las Palmeras, San Juan, Sajonia, Buenos Aires and Betania. On October 5, 1992, the Villalobos Agricultural Educational Institution was founded. Its first rector was Delfa Rosalén Cruz Chanchi, later Javier Murillo took over, who serves as rector to this day. The first health post was founded in 1965. Five years later in 1970, with the help of the mayor of Santa Rosa, the municipal health post was opened in San Juan. Parish priests are very important characters within the community. In addition to social work such as building schools and managing resources, they become cultural managers, since the town festivals are organized by the parish and the community.

== Economy ==
Wood extraction. The large-scale wood extraction was initially the main economic activity of the inhabitants who to settle in the Villalobos. As wood was an abundant resources, the newcomers cut down the trees with which they built their wooden houses roofed with tagua palm leaves, which also grew naturally in the region. The trees were cut down and sold to middlemen who arrived with trucks and loaded them into the interior of the country, to be sold in Cali, Valle del Cauca, to the company Cartones de Colombia, currently owned by the transnational Smurfit Kappa. As a consequence of this long-standing trade, the area was widely deforested, mostly on the banks of the road. At present, this profession is suspended in compliance with laws that prohibit the massive felling of trees for commercial purposes in the interest of protection and conservation of the environment.

The lulo bonanza. The elders say that when they first settled in the territory, it rained for a year straight. The land was not suitable for agriculture. They also did not have the knowledge to work on it. Food was brought from Huila on mule back. Year after year, with the trees decimated, the climate was transformed, and one of the endemic plants that they managed to cultivate was the lulo. The lulo grew wild, it didn't need fertilizers or pesticides and didn't require much care. As with wood, they sold their crops to middlemen, who then marketed them in Huila and Valle del Cauca. Economically, the cultivation and harvest of lulo meant the accumulation of capital for the peasant settlers who inhabited the region. With this income, the majority managed to buy the land they lived in, this is the case of some who currently own immense hectares of land; They also managed to build houses with materials, buy dairy cattle, horses and acquire properties in the nearby town of Pitalito, Huila. Also, some of their children were sent to Pitalito to receive quality education. But not everyone managed to make a future with the lulo bonanza. This was a purely masculine occupation, just like wood extraction.he main occupations according to the occupational census are agriculture, private employee, public employee, merchants and loggers, in addition to women housewives who have the largest number with 238, there are also panel workers, recyclers, coffee growers and cane growers.

The region's economy moves in three major sectors: agriculture, livestock and wood extraction. The majority of the population subsists on less than a minimum wage. 90% of families work the soil as farmers. Generally, the crops are for family consumption and barter within the community, called subsistence agricultural activities. Very little production is commercialized due to geographical isolation resulting from the lack of transportation routes 79. The inhabitants denounce the decline of agriculture, as a consequence of three factors: 1. the fumigations against illicit crops in the department of Putumayo in 2004 and 2005, 2. forced displacement and 3. the arrival of pests due to progressive global warming, who did not leave a lulo crop standing. In the 1990s, crops for illicit use such as poppies were planted, which, according to the Life Plan, were not successful due to the fact that the climatic conditions were not optimal, and were replaced by lulo crops.

== Tourism ==
San Juan de Villalobos is the only town in Bota Caucana region connected to the national highway system of Colombia, and as a result of this it has established itself as the gateway to the Bota Caucana region, which is one of the most biodiverse destinations of Colombia and attractive for the practice of birdwatching and other ecotourism alternatives.

== Demographics ==
San Juan de Villalobos is inhabited by a mixed population, including peasants, Afro-Colombians and indigenous people. According to the census carried out in 2009, the population of San Juan de Villalobos was 733 men and 585 women. The Origin of the inhabitants of San Juan de Villalobos is distributed as follows: 33% from Huila, 31% from Cauca, 11% from Putumayo, 5% from Caquetá, 3% from Nariño, 10% from the rest of the country.

== Geography ==
The populated center of San Juan de Villalobos is located in the south west of the department of Cauca, in the region known as Bota Caucana and is also part of the upper basin of the Caquetá River, which includes the municipalities of San Sebastián, Santa Rosa and Piamonte. Likewise, these become part of the Colombian Massif and the western beginning of the Amazon basin. The region is in turn divided into three subregions named as Alta Bota, Media Bota and Baja Bota. The district of San Juan de Villalobos occupies the region of Media Bota Caucana, which is entirely included in the Municipality of Santa Rosa. There is no road to communicate directly with Santa Rosa, since its only access route to the Department of Cauca is through the Pitalito (Huila) – Mocoa (Putumayo) highway. The section of the Pitalito-Mocoa highway that crosses Media Bota has a length of 48.7 km.

San Juan de Villalobos is located on a mountainous sector crossed by the Algeciras fault system and its main line is known as the San Francisco – Yunguillo Fault. Related to the line of this fault, a depression is distinguished where the town of San Juan de Villalobos is located, in which there are quaternary deposits and sedimentary rocks from the cretaceous and paleogene, confined between igneous-metamorphic rocks, by an arrangement of faults. “S” shaped. This depression is interpreted as another lazy S-shaped basin, in a relaxing bend of the main fault. Also striking are the lenses formed inside the basin by faults that affect the sedimentary succession and the folds that appear with axes parallel to the main fault, in accordance with the characteristics of these relaxation curves.
