= Serranía de los Churumbelos =

Colombian National Park

Parque Nacional Natural Serranía de Los Churumbelos Auka-Wasi
- Serranía de Los Churumbelos Auka-Wasi National Natural Park
- IUCN category II (national park)
- Location within Colombia
- Nearest city: Piamonte, Cauca, Colombia
- Coordinates: 01°14′32.32″N 76°30′28.34″W
- Area: 562 km^{2} (217 sq mi)
- Established: 30 August 2007
- Governing body: Dirección de Parques Nacionales Naturales del minambiente de Colombia

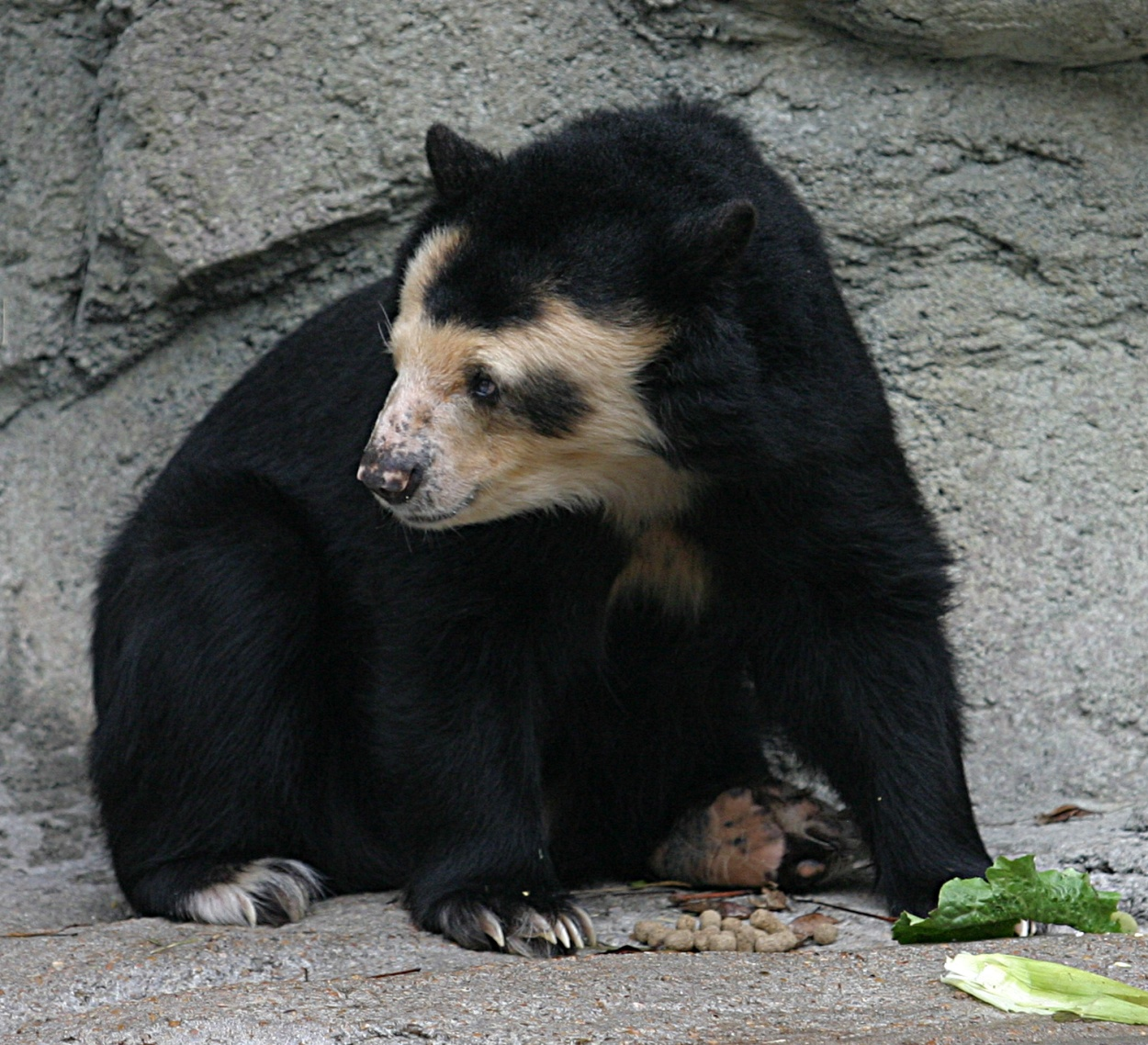
Spectacled bear

Serranía de Los Churumbelos Auka-Wasi National Natural Park (Spanish: Parque Nacional Natural Serranía de Los Churumbelos Auka-Wasi) was declared on 30 August 2007 by the Colombian government. It is located in the Bota Caucana of southern Colombia. Three biological expeditions conducted rapid biodiversity surveys and conservation assessments in Serranía de los Churumbelos from 1998 to 2000. The results from the expeditions were published by Fundacion ProAves in Conservacion Colombiana in 2007. These studies raised interest in the region and laid the justification for the protection of this spectacular mountain range.

== Location ==
Serranía de los Churumbelos forms the southernmost spur of the Eastern Cordillera of the Andes, and is situated on the border of four distinct biogeographical regions: lowland Amazonia, the Eastern Cordillera, the Central Cordillera and the dryer Magdalena Valley.

== Biological expeditions ==
The first studies of Serrania de los Churumbelos were carried out by Anglo-Colombian expeditions, "Colombia '98" and "EBA Project", initiatives of Colombian and UK students.

The mountain range was found to resemble the Northern Andean and Amazonia North Ecoregions. Several new plant species were discovered (in Gesneriaceae, Piperaceae and others). 462 bird species were recorded in Serranía de los Churumbelos, with 246 species ringed. Twelve threatened and near threatened bird species were recorded. It is estimated that the probable total bird species inventory exceeds 550 species: an exceptional diversity, making the Serranía a global avian "hotspot" and extremely important for bird diversity.

46 species of amphibians (30 species) and reptiles (16 species) were recorded, including four new species for Colombia and several potentially undescribed taxa. Mammals registered include spectacled bear (Tremarctos ornatus) and mountain tapir (Tapirus pinchaque). 150 Lepidoptera (butterfly) species were recorded.

== Environmental issues ==
The two greatest human pressures infiltrating the Serranía appear to be along the Caquetá River - Miraflor - Piamonte - Puerto Bello road and the Pitalito-San Juan de Villalobos-Mocoa road. Farming, hunting and cultivation pressures from environmentally poor crops such as coca and maize are the major threats to conservation in the region.

The steep sided slopes, combined with an extensive altitudinal gradient of the Serranía de los Churumbelos have created a number of different ecosystems and micro-habitat zones in the area. The myriad of ecosystems and habitats helps to explain to some extent the large scale spatial biodiversity of the Serranía. The existence of numerous range extensions in fauna and ecosystems typical of higher altitudes make the Serranía de los Churumbelos an area of high scientific interest.

A previously unexplored table top massif in the Serranía de los Churumbelos, reminiscent of the Tepuis, was explored in 1998 and named Alto Cagadero (1°14'32.32"N, 76°30'28.34"W).

== Conservation rationale for Serranía de los Churumbelos ==
There are strong biological justifications for the implementation of conservation measures. The Serranía de los Churumbelos encompasses a variety of ecosystems and micro-habitats, reflected in its high biodiversity. The eastern slope of the Andes has been subject to human population pressures and associated habitat degradation in recent years, but Serranía de los Churumbelos remained relatively intact having largely avoided the human impact that other regions have suffered. In recent years, the mountain range has come under increased pressure with the completion of the Mocoa-Bogotá highway, the proposed Puerto Asís-Florencia road, and the discovery and exploitation of petroleum and precious metals, all of which threaten a growth in human encroachment.
