= Valle de Paletará =

Valley between volcanoes in Cauca Department, Colombia

Location of the Valle de Paletará in Colombia.

Valle de Paletará is a valley in the Cauca Department on the Colombian Massif located at altitudes between 3000 and 3200 m.a.s.l. It is an almost flat area eroded by the Cauca River, adjacent to the Coconuco Volcanic Chain and other resurgent volcanic structures that exist in the vicinity such as the Yerbabuena Maar.

== Geography ==
The region called Valle de Paletará is limited by the foot of the Coconucos Volcanic Chain to the northeast and a series of low hills to the southeast called Cerros Cortaderal, Las Tusas, Loma del Apio, Cresta de Gallo and Loma de las Peñas, the which are raised with respect to the valley by a SE-NW fault. The valley presents a flat morphology filled with fine sediments of effusive and pyroclastic material from the neighboring volcanic centers of the area, such as those of the Coconuco Volcanic Chain, the Sotará volcanic complex and a series of phreatomagmatic structures located within the Paletará Valley itself.

== Geology ==
The Paletara valley constitutes the inner SW sector of the Paletará Caldera. The hills bordering the Valley towards the south are remnants of the rim and the valley itself is a plain formed by a volcanic and fluvioglacial fill on the caldera floor, given by the resurgent volcanic activity represented by Chagartón edifice and Coconuco Volcanic Chain inside the Palatará caldera. The other edges have been eroded leaving mountains with a rounded and elongated summit.

== Protected area ==
The Paletará Valley is located within the protected area of the Puracé National Natural Park whose main feature is the active stratovolcano Puracé, one of Colombia's most active volcanoes. Four of the country's most important rivers originate within the area: Magdalena River, Cauca River, Japurá River and Patía River.

== Weather ==
The average temperature is 6 °C. The warmest month of the year is February, at 8°C, and the coldest is May, at 4 °C. The average rainfall is 1,705 millimeters per year. The wettest month is November, with 225 millimeters of rain, and the driest is September, with 60 millimeters.

Valle de Paletará

Climate chart (precipitation, max. and min. temperature)
J	F	M	A	M	J	J	A	S	O	N	D
130 11 3	161 13 2	147 12 2	201 11 2	193 8 1	109 10 1	75 9 0	66 9 0	60 9 1	167 9 1	225 10 0	170 10 3
- █ Average max. and min. temperatures in °C
- █ Precipitation totals in mm
Imperial conversion
J	F	M	A	M	J	J	A	S	O	N	D
5.1 52 37	6.3 55 36	5.8 54 36	7.9 52 36	7.6 46 34	4.3 50 34	3 48 32	2.6 48 32	2.4 48 34	6.6 48 34	8.9 50 32	6.7 50 37
- █ Average max. and min. temperatures in °F
- █ Precipitation totals in inches
