= Descanse =

Village in Colombia

- Populated center

- Location within Colombia
- Coordinates: 1°29′10.5″N 76°37′17.3″W
- Country: Colombia
- Department: Cauca
- Municipality: Santa Rosa

Population
  - Total: 1,326 (2,018)

Descanse is a populated center of Colombia in the south of the department of Cauca in the region known as Media Bota Caucana, municipality of Santa Rosa located near the borders of Cauca with the department of Putumayo. Descanse has a population of 1,326 inhabitants including the rural area. The town was settled around year 1560. Despite its antiquity (around 460 years), it is one of the most isolated towns of the department of Cauca due to its location in the Colombian Massif and the lack of access roads since it is only connected to other population centers through horseshoe tracks.

== History of the name ==
Early anonymous colonial reports from around year 1560 report the existence of the town of Descanse, the town was also referred to as Discanzé or Discancé. In 1582 Fray Jerónimo de Escobar reported the existence of this population with the name of Yscanzé, name which according to oral tradition referred to an Inca chief who lead a group of Inca people through Colombian Massif around year 1560. The most recent reports refer to this town as Descanse or Descansé. The name Descansé is formed from the distortion of the word Yscansé which was also written Iscancé or Iscansé and which then became Discancé or Discansé and finally Descanse.

== History ==
Descanse is one of the oldest towns in the region, its existence begins to be recorded between 1550 and 1566 in anonymous reports with the name of Yscansé with a population of 5,000 indigenous people, By year 1572, during the Hispanic fundation (attributed to Captain Bernardo de Vargas Machuca and Captain Bartolomé Ruiz) the population had already been reduced to 2,000 people, of whom a part were later taken to work in the gold mines. Between 1730 and 1780 the town depended administratively on Almaguer. In year 1756, when the Franciscan Father Juan de Santa Gertrudis arrived at the place, Yscansé was renamed San Juan de Trujillo, by this time, the population had already been reduced to 12 families; Starting in 1820, with the withdrawal of the Spanish missionaries due to the independence of New Granada, Descanse, as well as Santa Rosa, fell into abandonment, until the discovery of cinchona trees and its trade attracted numerous settlers from Cauca. The arrival of Fray Isidoro de Montclar in 1904 was an important moment due to his contribution to the development of the community. Around 1915, the town was moved to its current location with the name Descanse and the site that was left uninhabited was called Pueblo Viejo (Old Town)". Descanse began to prosper and be repopulated; its first buildings, which are still preserved, have a colonial style, the houses are very large with two floors with balconies and large backyards almost the size of a city block.

== Economy ==
The population of Descanse dedicate themselves to agriculture and livestock farming as well as gold panning in the Cascabel River, located 5 kilometers from the town which is very rich in gold.

Descanse is traditionally an agricultural and cattle region; due to its mountain climate diversity, the lands are very productive; Almost everyone have their farm where they cultivate at ease. They cultivate tapioca, banana, beans, corn, peanuts, chontaduro, arracacha, pumpkin, yota, cocoa, sugar cane, among others; There is also a variety of fruits that include orange, avocado, lemon, mandarin, caimarón grape, soursop, guava, lulo, tree tomato, custard apple, papaya, guama, pineapple, piñuela, blueberry, arbutus, arazá and borojó among others.

The agricultural products are obtained for self-consumption and barter, as its commerce is hindered by the lack of the roads. However, the products of livestock farming and mining are well established and are sold directly in the capital of Putumayo, which generates a form of income to the locals.

== Tourism ==
Descanse is located in the region known as Bota Caucana region, which is one of the most biodiverse destinations of Colombia and attractive for the practice of birdwatching and other ecotourism alternatives.

== Demographics ==
The majority of the inhabitants belong to the Inga and Yanacona ethnic groups. The Inga or Inganos inhabit the San José reservation, which is located two hours away from the center of the town. There are also peasant settlers who arrived in the region in the 1950s.

== Geography ==
Descanse is divided in 10 veredas (rural settlements)

- La Cristalina
- El Encanto
- La Primavera
- Santa Clara
- La Isla
- El Cascajo
- Resguardo San José
- La Esperanza
- Santa Rita
- Descanse

Descanse is located on a small plateau surrounded by mountains with an altitude of 900 meters above sea level, and an average temperature of 25 degrees.
