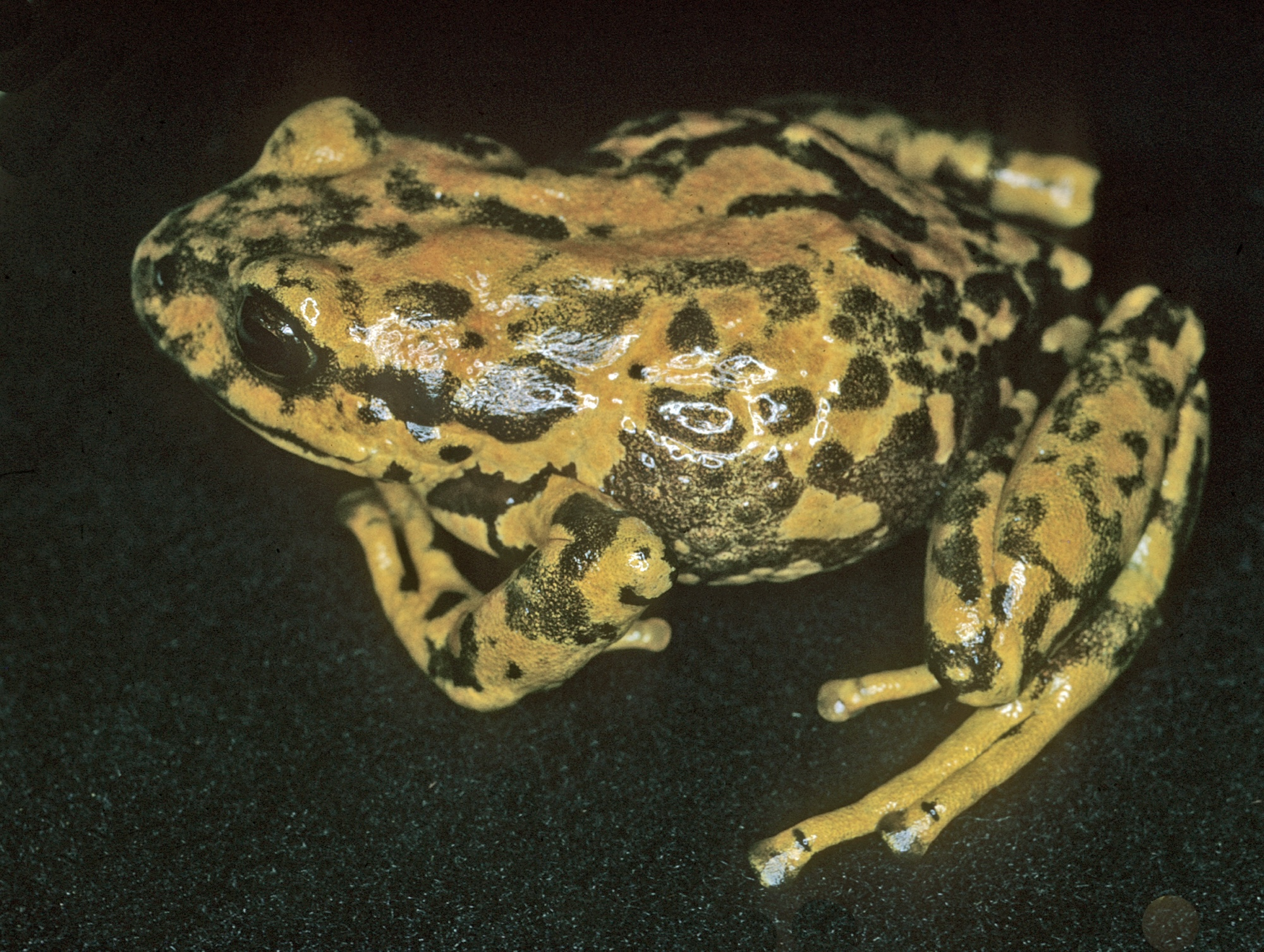
- Pristimantis obmutescens

Conservation status
- Least Concern (IUCN 3.1)

Scientific classification
- Kingdom: Animalia
- Phylum: Chordata
- Class: Amphibia
- Order: Anura
- Family: Strabomantidae
- Genus: Pristimantis
- Subgenus: Pristimantis
- Species: P. obmutescens

Binomial name
- Pristimantis obmutescens (Lynch, 1980)

Synonyms
- Eleutherodactylus obmutescens Lynch, 1980

= Pristimantis obmutescens =

Species of frog

Pristimantis obmutescens is a species of frog in the family Strabomantidae. It is endemic to Colombia and known from the páramos of Cordillera Central in the Cauca and Huila Departments. Common name paramos robber frog has been coined for it. The specific name obmutescens is Latin and means "keeping silent", inferred from the lack of vocal slits or sac in males and the thick skin covering the tympanum. Despite this, the species is reported to call.

== Description ==
Adult males measure 21–27 mm (0.83–1.06 in) and adult females 29–38 mm (1.1–1.5 in) in snout–vent length. The head narrower than the body. The snout is short and rounded (or weakly subacuminate in dorsal view). The tympanum is concealed beneath the skin on the side of the head. Skin of dorsum has large, flat warts. The fingers have thick, fleshy lateral fringes and broad discs. The toes have lateral fringes and discs that are broader than long. Coloration is dark brown to yellowish-olive above. There are few brown dorsal spots, and the flanks have dark brown spots. The throat is yellow to gray-brown. The venter is gray to pale brown. The groin and posterior surfaces of the thighs are reddish-brown. The iris is brown and has copper flecks and a dark brown horizontal streak.

== Habitat and conservation ==
Pristimantis obmutescens occurs in páramos at elevations of 2,800–3,500 m (9,200–11,500 ft) above sea level. It is usually found in bushy and herbaceous vegetation. It is mostly nocturnal, but males call during the day from shelters. It is a common species that is not facing major threats. Its range overlaps with the Puracé and Nevado del Huila National Natural Parks.
