= Piamonte =

- Municipality and town
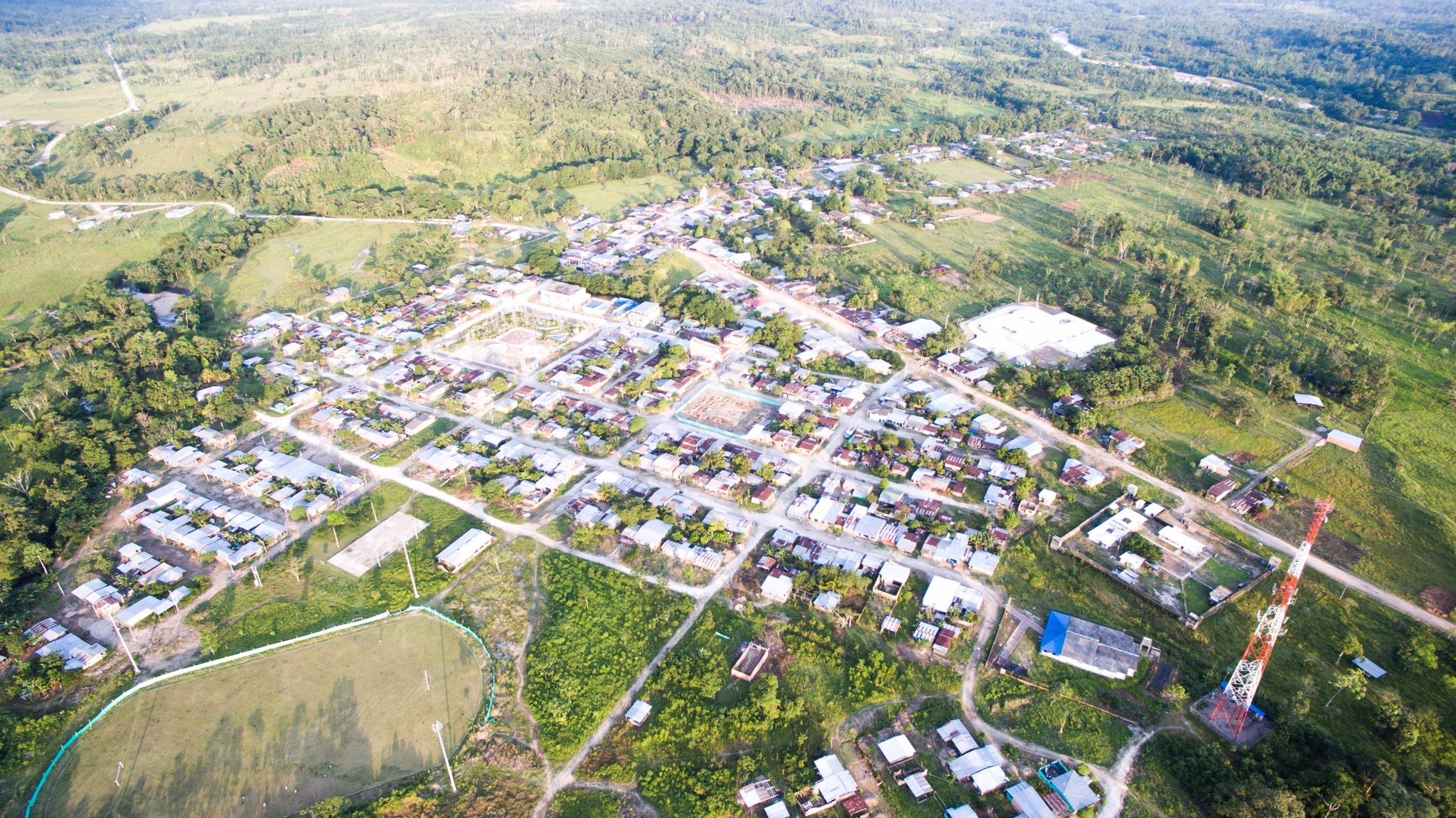
- Aerial view

- Flag

- Location of the municipality and town of Piamonte in the Cauca Department of Colombia.
- Coordinates: 1°07′10″N 76°19′37″W
- Country: Colombia
- Department: Cauca Department
- Founded: 2 July 1959
- Founder: Aristides Pérez
- Elevation: 300 m (980 ft)

Population (2020)
  - Total: 9,259
- Time zone: UTC-5 (Colombia Standard Time)
- Climate: Af
- Website: www.piamonte-cauca.gov.co

Piamonte is a town and municipality in the Cauca Department, Colombia.

Piamonte was founded in 1959 as a district of the municipality of Santa Rosa. Its inhabitants are settlers from various regions of the interior of Colombia that have been established there in successive migrations attracted initially by the quinine bonanza in the 1930s, displaced by the violence in the 1950s and 1960s and finally attracted by the oil fever. There are also members of the Inga indigenous community. Piamonte was declared as municipality in 1996.

The municipality of Piamonte borders to the north with the Huila Department and the municipality of Santa Rosa in the Cauca Department; to the East with the Caquetá Department with the municipalities of Belén de los Andaquíes and San José del Fragua, to the West with the municipality of Santa Rosa and the Río Caquetá and towards the south with the Putumayo department.

== History ==
The town of Piamonte was established 1959 by a group of settlers led by Aristides Perez in a site known at the time as La Barbasca. In the year 1966, some leaders of the area, including Bosco Arcos, José Antonio Hurtado, Gustavo Pérez and Arístides Pérez among others, proposed the separation of the Piamonte from the municipality of Santa Rosa; this proposal materialized years later as result of the incursion of several petroleum companies in the regions in the early 1990s. Piamonte was recognized as a municipality under ordinance 024 of November 18, 1996.

The process of settlement of the area of Baja Bota was slow until recently. The first settlements know were reported in the 1930s; Among them, the Inganos stand out in Guayuyaco and other sectors of the Andean foothills towards Belén de Andaquies, apparently people displaced from Putumayo.Nápoles, which is the oldest departmental inspection in the area, was settled by migrants from Nariño, on the strategic trail today known as the Carretera Marginal de la Selva (Peripheral Road of the Jungle). This settlement had to be moved to a new location in the early 1970s, after a flood in the upper plains of the Caquetá River devastated a significant part of the town and caused losses to the settlers in its surroundings.By the 1950s, starting from the main trail, roads were opened into the interior of the area and the first ones opened in Piamonte, on the Tambor, Miraflor and Campoalegre rivers, on the Guayuyaco and Nabueno rivers. This is how the strip with the oldest settlement is located in the upper part of the area, demarcated by the trail. Since that time, two areas have been defined, according to the migratory currents that penetrated the area and the market and service centers to which its inhabitants go. To demarcate them, an imaginary curve could be drawn.between Puerto Bello, at the northwestern end, bordering the mountain range and then following the course of the Inchiyaco River on its left bank, to the El Cedro settlement. To the east of this curve is the area of direct influence of the Caquetá, the object of a colonization that penetrated along the trail from San José del Fragua, Yurayaco and Fragüita and extended along the banks of the Fragua, the Congor and the Tambor. This route was not as important as the one that penetrated in the last decade from Currillo up the Caquetá River, when factors such as the so-called crisis of the colonizing model in Caquetá, the opening of the road to the port of Currillo and the appearance of the coca economy.The migratory flow that entered from the west came mostly from Nariño and Putumayo, a product of the migratory movement that began from the high plateau to the slope of the eastern mountain range. The colonizing flow moved through the valley of the Mocoa River until it reached its mouth in the Caquetá River in Puerto Limón; intensified with the subsequent opening of roads penetration in the past decade. Currently, in terms of the categories of land holders, it can be seen that in Baja Bota Caucana the vast majority of inhabitants are settlers who have de facto possession over their improvements, without mediating the legal act of titling. For the settler, the property title is a necessary requirement, but not sufficient to access institutional credit (type Caja Agraria). In Baja Bota, the age of the settlement corresponds in some parts to the existence of an incipient livestock activity. This activity is concentrated in the strip that demarcates the line of the Peripheral trail from Piamonte, La Vega, to Naples-El Edén, in properties that are located in the range of 100 to 200 hectares. The process of municipalization emerged between the years 1994-1996, from its segregation from the municipality of Santa Rosa. Its creation was the result of the coca strikes that occurred during this time, due to the abandonment that peasants and indigenous people felt by the state, and to the fact that no resources from the exploitation of the oil were allocated to the Baja Bota region.

== Geography ==
In geographical terms, the municipality of Piamonte located in an area known as the Baja Bota Caucana, due to the characteristic shape of its map, is located in the Southwest of the Department of Cauca, which is in an region of transition between the Pacific coast, the Andes and the Amazon rainforest. Part of its potential comes from its location since it is a strategic transit area and border between four departments that are located in the Colombian Massif region -an important water source-, biologically it becomes the merging point between the Central Cordillera, the Eastern Cordillera, the Amazon, the Magdalena Valley and the Eastern Slope of the Andes, becoming a jungle corridor natural. In the South American context, it has to be highlighted this region of the Amazon is located at a distance of 335 km from the Pacific Ocean, which makes it the shortest stretch of land between the Pacific ocean and the Amazon in all of South America. Piamonte is part of the Amazon basin characterized by its high biodiversity, water resources, oil and ancestral culture

== Economy ==
Piamonte has an economy based on the extraction of natural resources cinchona, rubber, wood, oil and coca, and specialized in agricultural activities for subsistence, with traditional crops such as banana, cassava, corn, chontaduro. Amazonian fruit trees stand out such as arazá, borojó and caimarón grape. The economic impacts have to do with its character as a development hub, since among its goals is enabling regional coordination and the transit of goods. Piamonte as an Amazon region that contains oil deposit under its subsoil covers southern Colombia, part of Ecuador and Peru, which is currently being exploited by Oil Companies. In Piamonte, the multinational Argosy Energy International, a subsidiary of Canadian Gran Tierra Energy, has explored and exploited 5 wells: Mary 1, Mary 2, Mary3, Mary 5 and Miralor 1 from 1993 to 2008. The current oil exploitation activities are being carried out by Gran Tierra Energy Inc. Oil production in 2002 was 2290 barrels/day; the oil reserves discovered to be exploited: approximately three million barrels. Large private companies are the main generators of employment are the Gran Tierra Company with facilities in the village of La Honda, Rosario, El Morro, Florida West; the Betra Company with facilities in the Piamonte, Petronova in vereda La Samaritana and Oilgrass with explorations around Piamonte.

According to the Territorial Planning Scheme, the municipality of Piamonte is responsible by law (141 of 1994, article 31) for 12.5% of the 20% of the total royalties, which must be allocated according to article 15, 100% social investment, in priority projects contemplated in the general development plan of the Municipality. At least 80% of the income received must be invested until minimum coverage is reached in the basic social programs of electricity and environmental sanitation. Despite the law, a large percentage of the region lacks these services; only the population centers of Piamonte and Miraflor have very recent electrical interconnection. Having these riches has not translated into better living conditions for the residents, nor are they expressed in social or economic investment by the State; a great contradiction typical of the dynamics of capitalism that privileges some regions at the expense of the misery and exploitation

Piamonte is recognized as a place of transit due to the constant population mobility from neighboring departments such as Putumayo, Caquetá and Huila, due to forced displacement, the search for wealth or the arrival of people in search of productive lands, which is why it can be denominated as a multicultural municipality given its social composition. It is commercially linked with neighboring towns in the departments of Caquetá and Putumayo such as: Curillo, San José del Fragua, and Belén de los Andaquíes in the first case and Villagarzón and Mocoa in the second.

== Communications ==
The Carretera Marginal de La Selva (Peripheral Road of the Jungle), which crosses the municipality of Piamonte, is part of a series of megaprojects aimed at connecting all of South America with road infrastructure (IIRSA) from Piamonte, to Villagarzón and Puerto Asís towards Ecuador, and from Villagarzón towards Pasto and Tumaco.

== Demographics ==
The municipality of Piamonte is inhabited by settlers from the interior of the country (departments of Caquetá, Putumayo, Nariño and Cauca), also by indigenous peoples – 12.24% of the Inga ethnic group – and a significant percentage of Afro-descendants.

Its population, as of 2012, amounted to “7,241 people, of which 8.29% (600) live in the municipal capital and the remaining 91.71% (6,641) in the rural area. There is a total of 69 villages, and the indigenous population is organized into 9 councils recognized by the indigenous authorities: Bajo Chuspizacha, San Gabriel, Alto Suspizacha, Rumiñawi, San Jose del Inchiyaco, Ambiwasi, Musurrunacuna, Caucapapungo and Aukawasi. As well as 6 Reservations legally recognized for the Inga community: Guayuyaco, Inga Wasipanga, La Floresta Española, La Leona, Las Brisas and San Rafael..

=== Administrative Division of Piamonte ===
Corregiment	Veredas (Inspections)	# of Veredas
Piamonte	EL Convenio, San Isidro, El Jardin, La Sonora, Puerto Bello, Santa Rita, La Vega, San Jorge, Piamonte, Nueva Esperanza	9
El Remanso	Villalozada, Las Perlas, El Morro, Las Delicias, Playa Rica, Puerto Miranda, El Remanso, La Libertad	7
Miraflor	Buenos Aires, Sevilla, EL Rosal, San Pablo, La Palmera, La Floresta, Campoalegre, Nabueno, El Cerrito, La Segovia, La Gaviota, La Esmeralda, Bajo Inchiyaco, La Española, Miraflor, La Floresta Española	15
Yapurá	Angosturas, Bututo, Villanueva, Palmito, La Consolata, Yapurá	5
Nápoles	Baja Primavera, El Edén, La Guajira, La Florida, Nápoles	4
EL Cedro	El Vergel, El Caraño, Trojayaco, La Samaritana, Villa del Prado, Los Almendros, El Cedro	6
El Bombonal	La Leona, Brasilia, El Bombonal, Puerto Bello, La Isla	4
Bajo Congor	El Diamante, La Cabaña, El Triunfo Congor, La Tigra, Bajo Congor	4
Fragua VIejo	EL Porvenir, San Gabriel, El Sinaí, Los Pios, Fragua Viejo, Reservation San Rafael	5

== Climate ==
Piamonte has a tropical rainforest climate (Köppen Af) with hot temperatures, high humidity and heavy to very heavy rainfall year-round.

Climate data for Piamonte
Month	Jan	Feb	Mar	Apr	May	Jun	Jul	Aug	Sep	Oct	Nov	Dec	Year
Mean daily maximum °C (°F)	30.7 (87.3)	30.4 (86.7)	29.9 (85.8)	29.5 (85.1)	29.3 (84.7)	28.9 (84.0)	28.8 (83.8)	29.6 (85.3)	30.0 (86.0)	30.4 (86.7)	30.3 (86.5)	30.4 (86.7)	29.9 (85.7)
Daily mean °C (°F)	25.7 (78.3)	25.5 (77.9)	25.3 (77.5)	25.0 (77.0)	24.9 (76.8)	24.6 (76.3)	24.3 (75.7)	24.7 (76.5)	25.1 (77.2)	25.4 (77.7)	25.5 (77.9)	25.6 (78.1)	25.1 (77.2)
Mean daily minimum °C (°F)	20.8 (69.4)	20.7 (69.3)	20.7 (69.3)	20.6 (69.1)	20.5 (68.9)	20.3 (68.5)	19.9 (67.8)	19.9 (67.8)	20.3 (68.5)	20.5 (68.9)	20.8 (69.4)	20.9 (69.6)	20.5 (68.9)
Average rainfall mm (inches)	230 (9.1)	247 (9.7)	367 (14.4)	418 (16.5)	444 (17.5)	461 (18.1)	418 (16.5)	301 (11.9)	322 (12.7)	341 (13.4)	341 (13.4)	267 (10.5)	4,157 (163.7)
Source: Climate-Data.org

== Places of interest ==
The Serranía de Los Churumbelos Auka-Wasi National Natural Park located in the mountainous part of the municipality.
