= Bootheel =

Bootheel can refer to:

- The heel of a boot (a type of footwear)
- In the United States, a term used for a short type of panhandle protruding southward, including:
  The Missouri Bootheel, a region in the southeastern part of the state
  The New Mexico Bootheel, a region in the southwestern part of the state
- The Salento peninsula of Italy, also known colloquially as "Italy's bootheel"
