= Corridor =

Corridor or The Corridor may refer to:

== Arts, entertainment, and media ==
=== Films ===
- The Corridor (1968 film), a 1968 Swedish drama film
- The Corridor (1995 film), a 1995 Lithuanian drama film
- The Corridor (2010 film), a 2010 Canadian horror film
- The Corridor (2013 film), a 2013 Iranian drama film
- Corridor (film), a 2013 short horror film

=== Other uses in arts, entertainment, and media ===
- Corridor (band), a Canadian indie rock band from Montreal, Quebec
- Corridor (album), a 2009 album by Japanese pop singer Miki Imai
- Corridor (comics), the first Indian graphic novel, written by Sarnath Banerjee
- Corridor (short story collection), a short story collection by Alfian Sa'at, published in 1999
- The Corridor (opera), a 2009 chamber opera composed by Harrison Birtwistle
- Corridor Digital, an American production studio based in Los Angeles

== Passageways ==
- A narrow hallway, or corridor, a passageway to provide access between rooms inside a building
- A passageway along a corridor coach
- Wildlife corridor

== Transportation ==
- Corridor (Via Rail), a rail network running from Quebec City to Windsor, Ontario, Canada
- Air corridor, a designated travel path for aircraft
- Transport corridor, a (generally linear) tract of land in which at least one main line for some mode of transport has been built
  - Corridor, a highway that is part of the Appalachian Development Highway System in the United States
  - Highway corridor, a general path that a highway follows
- Humanitarian corridor

== Other uses ==
- Operation Corridor, a Serb military operation in Bosnia in 1992
- The Corridor, Bath, an early shopping arcade built in Bath, Somerset, England in 1825

== See also ==
- Cloister
