= North Bengal division =

North Bengal উত্তরবঙ্গ
- Geographical region
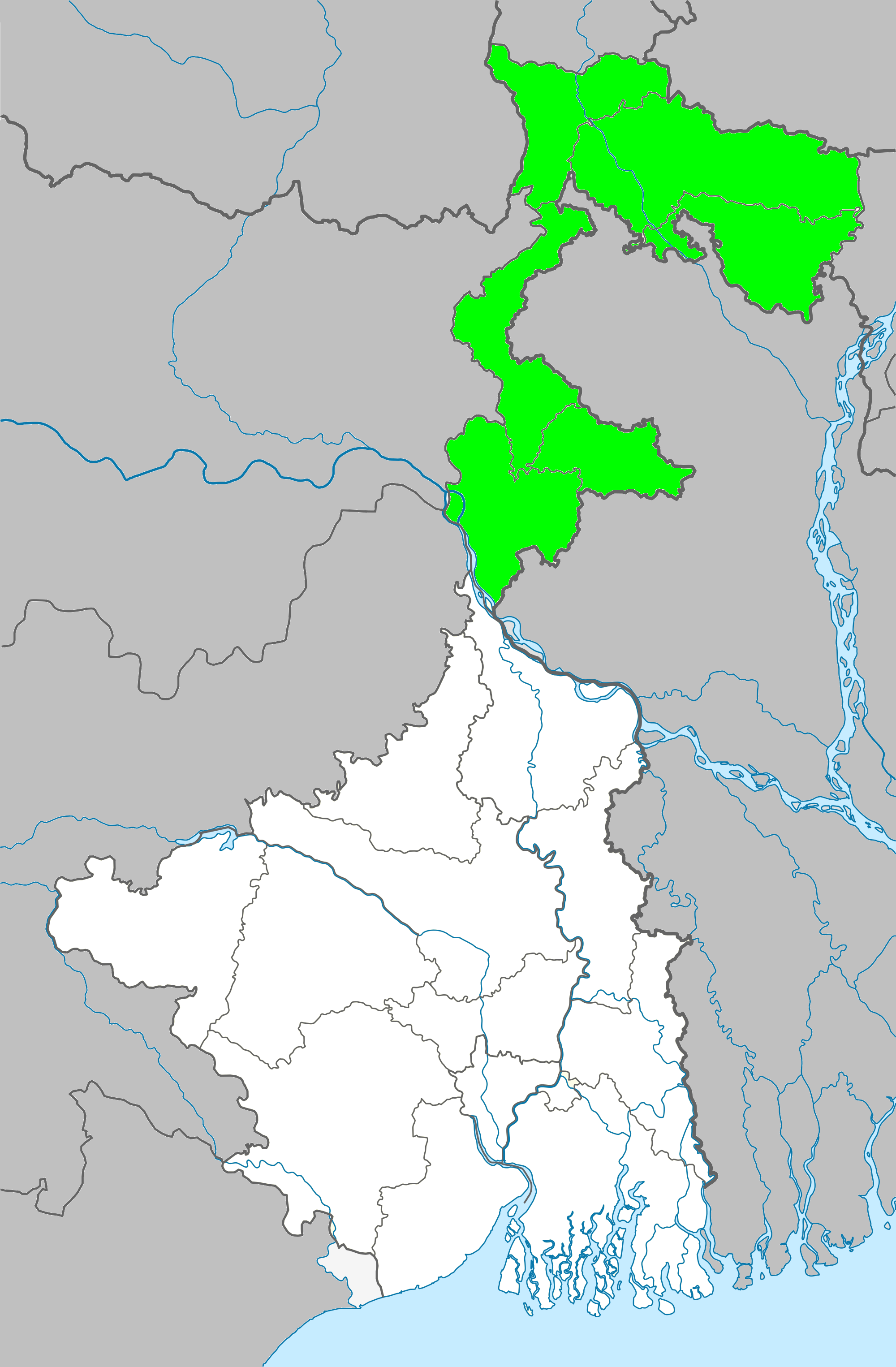
- North Bengal Districts, Districts of West Bengal

- Location in West Bengal, India
- Coordinates: 26.5°N 88.5°E
- Country: India
- State: West Bengal
- Divisions: Jalpaiguri, Malda

Government
  - Type: Regional administration

Area
  - Total: 26,282 km^{2} (10,148 sq mi)
- Comprises Darjeeling hills and Dooars plains

Population (2011)
  - Total: 17,211,010
  - Density: 654.86/km^{2} (1,696.1/sq mi)
- Demonym: North Bengali

Religion
  - Major religions: Hinduism, Islam
- Time zone: UTC+5:30 (IST)
- Postal code: Varies by district
- Area code: Varies by district

North Bengal is a geographical region consisting of eight districts in the northern part of West Bengal in India. To the north of this region are Sikkim and Bhutan; to the east are Assam and the Rangpur and Rajshahi divisions of Bangladesh; to the south is the Murshidabad district of West Bengal; and to the west are Bihar and Nepal. The Ganges River separates North Bengal from South Bengal.

Geographically, this region is made up of the Darjeeling hills and the Dooars plains. Economically, North Bengal is backward compared to South Bengal. However, due to its scenic natural environment, the tourism industry in this region is very well developed. Siliguri is the main city of North Bengal; it is the third most populous city in West Bengal and also the gateway to the entire northeastern region of India.

== Geography ==
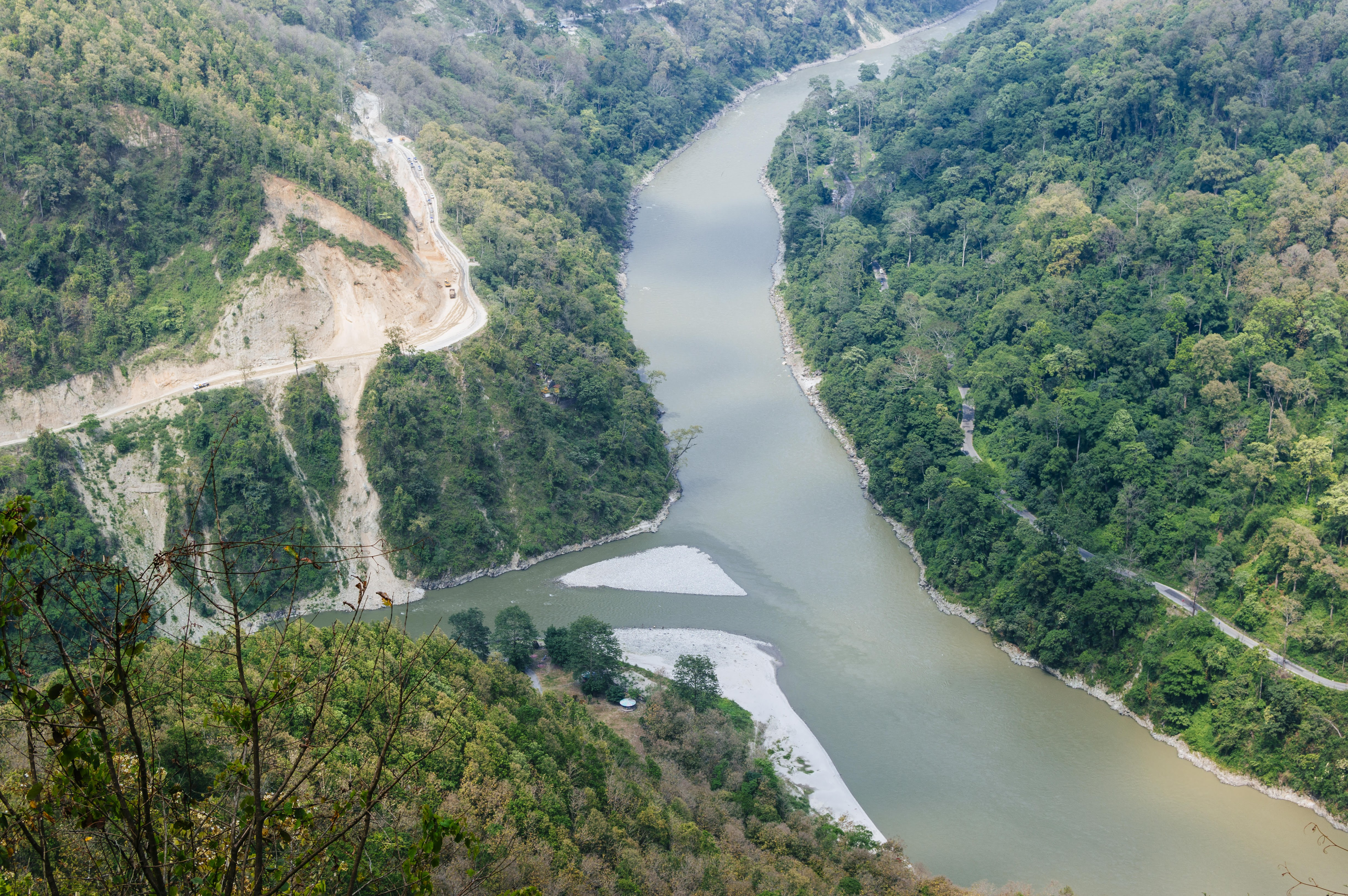
The Teesta River flows southward and the Rangit River joins the Teesta from the west

Geographically, North Bengal is formed by the Darjeeling hills and the Dooars plains. The Darjeeling hilly region consists of the Darjeeling Sadar, Kurseong, and Mirik subdivisions of Darjeeling district, and the entire Kalimpong district. Sandakphu in this region is the highest peak in West Bengal. The Dooars plain region is formed by the plains of Alipurduar, Cooch Behar, Jalpaiguri, and the plain areas of Darjeeling. The narrow strip of land in North Bengal called the Siliguri Corridor connects Northeast India with the mainland of India. Additionally, the Tin Bigha Corridor leased to Bangladesh connects Dahagram with the mainland of Bangladesh. The main rivers of North Bengal are the Teesta, Torsha, Jaldhaka, Raidak, Mahananda, etc.

== Biodiversity ==
The vegetation of North Bengal depends on altitude and the amount of rainfall. For example, the Duars region is full of sal and other tropical evergreen plants. On the other hand, at elevations above 1000 meters, most forest plants are subtropical. At 1500 meters altitude, the Darjeeling hills are dominated by various temperate plants like oak, conifer, and rhododendron.

Among the national parks of North Bengal, the notable ones are Gorumara National Park, Jaldapara National Park, Buxa National Park, Singalila National Park, and Neora Valley National Park. Among these, Gorumara and Jaldapara are famous for the one-horned rhinoceros. Neora Valley National Park, located in Kalimpong district, is one of the richest biological zones in Eastern India.

== Administration ==
North Bengal consists of the entire Jalpaiguri division and the Malda division, excluding Murshidabad district. The districts included in North Bengal are Alipurduar, Uttar Dinajpur, Kalimpong, Cooch Behar, Jalpaiguri, Dakshin Dinajpur, Darjeeling, and Malda.

The North Bengal Development Department of the Government of West Bengal is responsible for the administration of the districts of North Bengal. Besides, in the hilly areas of Darjeeling and Kalimpong districts, there exists a self-governing body called the Gorkhaland Territorial Administration.

== Demographics ==
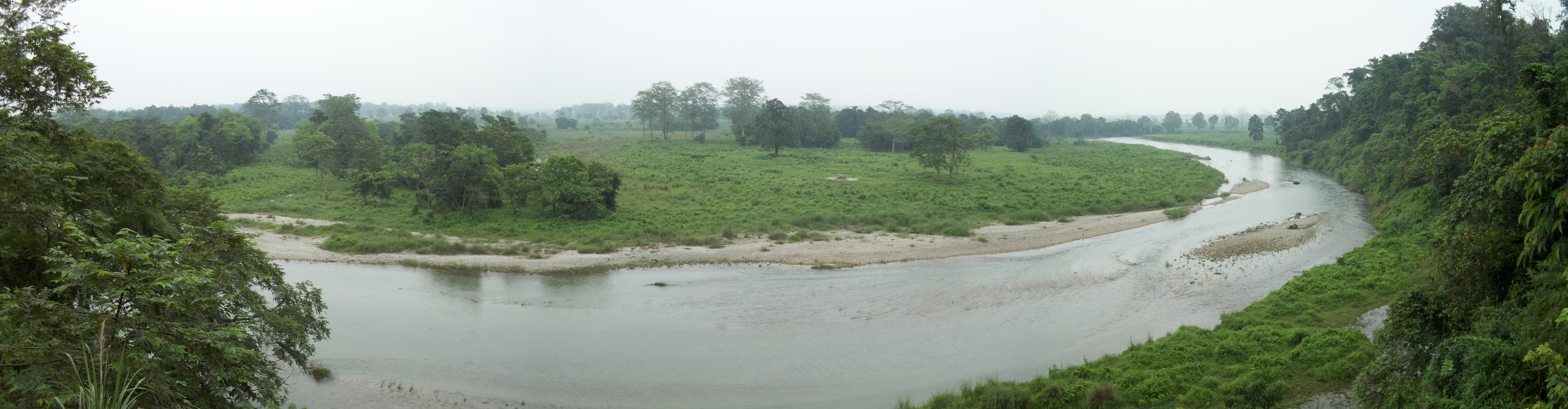
Gorumara National Park

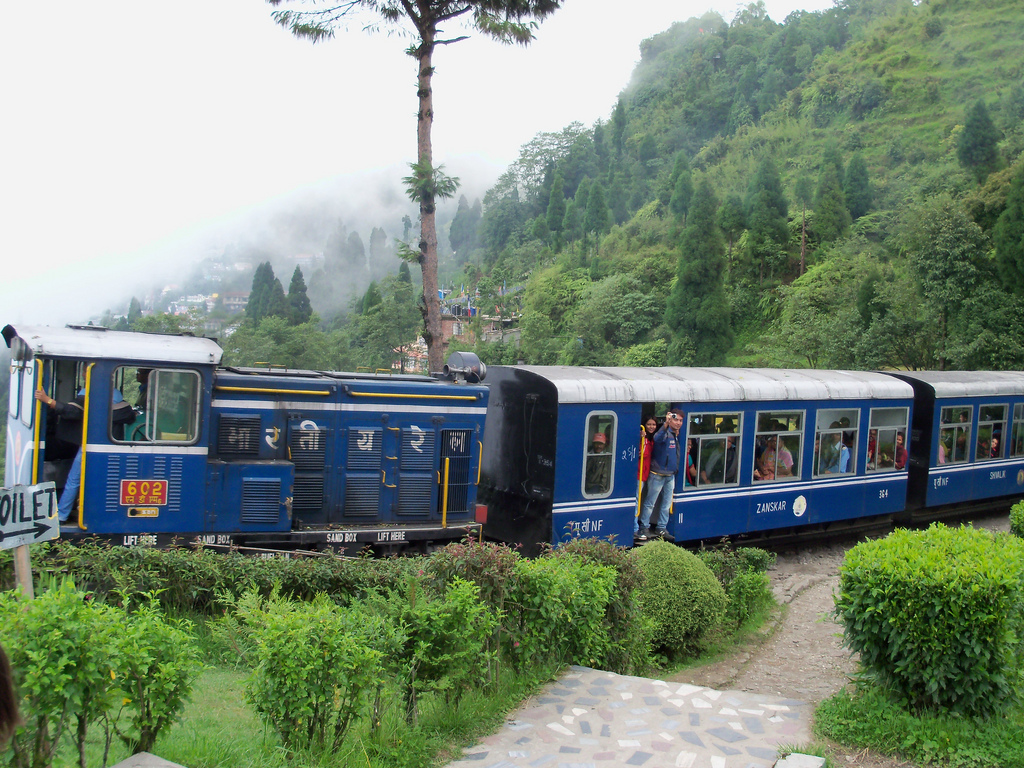
Darjeeling Toy Train on Batasia Loop

According to the 2011 census, the population of North Bengal is 17,211,010. Hinduism and Islam are the major religions in this region.

== Transport ==
=== Rail ===
North Bengal is connected to various cities of India by rail. The New Jalpaiguri Junction railway station in North Bengal is an important station under the Northeast Frontier Railway. Some of the major broad-gauge rail services of North Bengal include the Darjeeling Mail, Uttar Banga Express, Howrah–New Jalpaiguri Shatabdi Express, Howrah–New Jalpaiguri Vande Bharat Express, and the international Mitali Express. Besides these, the narrow-gauge Darjeeling Himalayan Railway (Toy Train) is one of the major attractions for tourists in North Bengal.

=== Bus ===
The North Bengal State Transport Corporation provides bus services in North Bengal. Its headquarters is in Cooch Behar, and the corporation has bus depots in various towns of North Bengal. Apart from North Bengal, this corporation also operates bus services in other parts of West Bengal and even in some neighboring states.

== Tourism ==
There are many tourist spots in North Bengal, among which Darjeeling, Jaldapara, Gorumara, Buxa, Cooch Behar, and Malda are notable.

== Proposal for separate states ==
=== Gorkhaland ===
Gorkhaland is a proposed state in India, which has long been demanded on the basis of ethnic-linguistic rights by the Indian Gorkha community of the Darjeeling Hills and Dooars in West Bengal. The Gorkhaland movement gained momentum due to ethnic, linguistic, and cultural sentiments among those who feel comfortable identifying themselves as Indian Gorkhas. Two major movements for Gorkhaland have taken place under the Gorkha National Liberation Front (1986–1988) and the Gorkha Janmukti Morcha (2007–present).

=== Kamtapur ===
The demand for the creation of a Kamtapur state in North Bengal has mainly been led by the Kamtapur Liberation Organization (KLO). The proposed state includes the plains of Cooch Behar, Jalpaiguri, and Darjeeling in West Bengal, and the districts of Goalpara, Dhubri, South Salmara, Bongaigaon, and Kamrup in Assam.

=== North Bengal state ===
In 2021, Bharatiya Janata Party (BJP) legislator John Barla proposed a separate North Bengal state or union territory, separated from West Bengal. BJP legislators Jayanta Kumar Roy, Anandamay Barman, and Shikha Chattopadhyay supported the proposal. At that time, out of 54 MLAs in North Bengal, 30 were from the BJP.

However, the West Bengal unit of the BJP distanced itself from this separate state proposal. West Bengal Pradesh Congress president Adhir Ranjan Chowdhury claimed that it was a conspiracy to separate the Muslim-majority region of the state and alleged the involvement of the Rashtriya Swayamsevak Sangh behind it. A Trinamool Congress leader filed a complaint against John Barla for demanding a separate state.

Various communities in North Bengal—such as Bengalis, Nepalis, Adivasis, and Rajbanshis—opposed the proposal for a separate North Bengal and any division of West Bengal.

On 24 July 2023, BJP state president and Member of Parliament Sukanta Majumdar proposed including the eight districts of North Bengal under the North Eastern Council without dividing West Bengal. However, Kurseong MLA Bishnu Prasad Sharma opposed it. Trinamool called Sukanta's proposal "separatist." Trinamool spokesperson Riju Dutta labeled the BJP "anti-Bengal" and "anti-Bengali" for the proposal.

On 25 July, another Member of Parliament, Nishikant Dubey, demanded the creation of a separate union territory comprising Malda and Murshidabad districts of West Bengal, Araria, Katihar, and Kishanganj districts of Bihar, and the Santhal Pargana region of Jharkhand. According to him, the Hindu and tribal populations in those areas are declining due to an increase in the number of Bangladeshi immigrants.

On 29 July, Chief Minister Mamata Banerjee opposed the division of West Bengal in the Legislative Assembly.
