= Santa Rosa, Cauca =

Coordinates: 1.72944°N 76.6044°W

- Municipality and town
- Municipio de Santa Rosa, Cauca
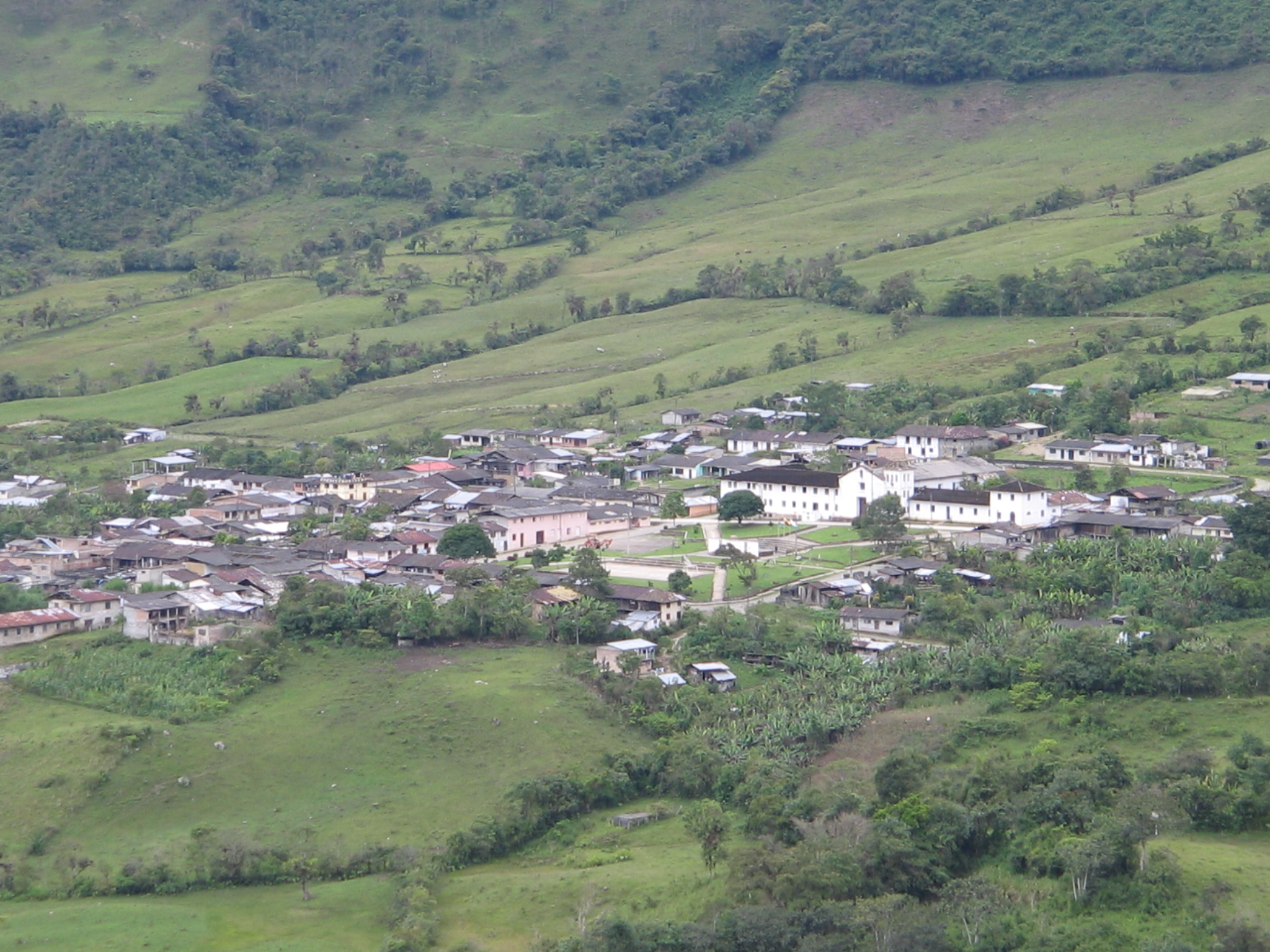
- View of Santa Rosa, Cauca

- Flag

- Location of the municipality and town of Santa Rosa, Cauca in the Cauca Department of Colombia.
- Country: Colombia
- Department: Cauca Department
- First foundation: 1551
- Elevation: 1,700 m (5,600 ft)

Population (Census 2018)
  - Municipality and town: 5,339
  - Urban: 1,579
- Time zone: UTC-5 (Colombia Standard Time)
- Climate: Cfb

Santa Rosa is a Colombian municipality located in the department of Cauca, in the region known as the Bota Caucana. It is located on the eastern slope of the Colombian Massif, the mountainous area where the Central and Oriental Cordilleras merge. Its economy is based on agriculture, its main products are corn, sugar cane, plantain and livestock. It includes the corregiments of Carmelo, San Juan de Villalobos and Descanse.

== History ==
The town of Santa Rosa had several foundations. The first settlement was entrusted by the Spanish crown to Antonio Gonzalez who then delegated it to Bernardino Mujica. In June 26, 1593, Captain Bernardo de Vargas Machuca, a Spaniard from the city of Simancas reported having reached the settlement on the side of the Iscansé river. He then named the town Simancas in the memory of his home town. The Iscansé river that Vargas Machuca mentions is the upper course of today's Caquetá river. In the year 1600, the Andakies and Aguanungas, indigenous tribes from these region, rebelled and destroyed the towns of Mocoa and Simancas.

In order to protect the memory of the town, a commemorative plate was placed by the local community on the walls of the Church of Santa Rosa in the center of the town that reads:

"ESTE LUGAR 
 FUE SEDE DE UNA DE LAS
 FUNDACIONES DE SIMANCAS, 
 ACTUALMENTE SANTAROSA: 1551, 1595,1685,1871,1907
 TESTIMONIO DE ALCIDES JIMENEZ, RODRIGO BOTINA Y MARIO MEJIA - SANTA ROSA 1991"

Translation:

"This place is one of the foundational sites of Simancas, 
 Currently Santarosa:1551, 1595,1685, 1871,1907
 Testimony of Alcides JImenez, Rodrigo Botina & Mario Mejia - Santa Rosa 1991

The most recent foundation of Santa Rosa is attributed to Eduwiges Becerra and Benito Mavesoy who allegedly donated the land in year 1870. After August 30, 1872, Leonidas Gómez from Almaguer, Quina's agent, changed the name of Villa or Town of Simancas to Santa Rosa. However, there is no consensus among historians about the details of the foundation events. Some historians claim that the land for the foundation was donated to the Catholic Church in July 17, 1898.

== Demographics ==
The municipality of Santa Rosa presented a -4.4% annual population growth between 2005 and 2018

		Population		
Town name	type	locality	rural	total
Descanse	corregiment	396	930	1,326
El Carmelo	corregiment	177	416	593
San Juan de Villalobos	corregiment	349	820	1,169
Santa Rosa	Capital	672	1,579	2,251
	TOTAL	1,594	3,745	5,339
