= Puracé =

Volcanic mountain in Colombia

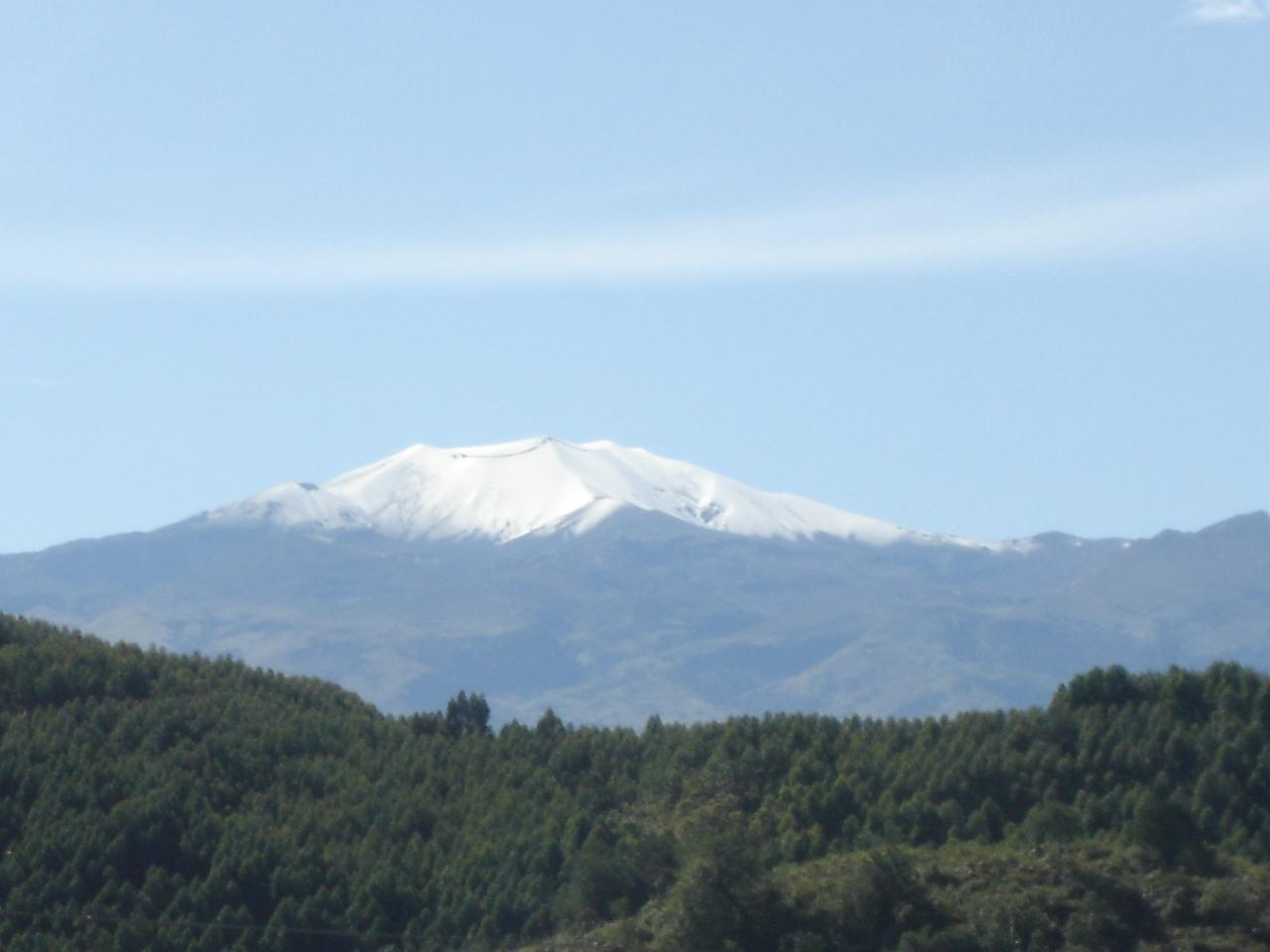
- Purace volcano seen from Popayán in 2006

Highest point
- Elevation: 4,646 m (15,243 ft)
- Prominence: 347 m (1,138 ft)
- Coordinates: 2°18′50″N 76°23′43″W

Geography
- Location within Colombia
- Location: Cauca, Colombia
- Parent range: Central Ranges, Andes

Geology
- Mountain type: Andesitic stratovolcano
- Volcanic belt: North Volcanic Zone; Andean Volcanic Belt
- Last eruption: 19 January 2025 (ongoing)

Puracé is an andesitic stratovolcano located in the Puracé National Natural Park in the Cauca Department, Colombia. It is part of the North Volcanic Zone of the Andean Volcanic Belt. The volcano is located at the intersection of the Coconucos and Morras Faults.

It is one of the most active volcanoes in Colombia. Large explosive eruptions occurred in 1849, 1869, 1885, 1949, 1950, 1956, and 1957. There were about a dozen eruptions in the 20th century, the most recent being in 1977, until 19 January 2025 when Puracé once again erupted. On this occasion, volcanic ash was deposited 7 kilometres (4.3 mi) away. Fumaroles were seen near the summit in 1990, and hot springs emerged from some of the lower slopes.

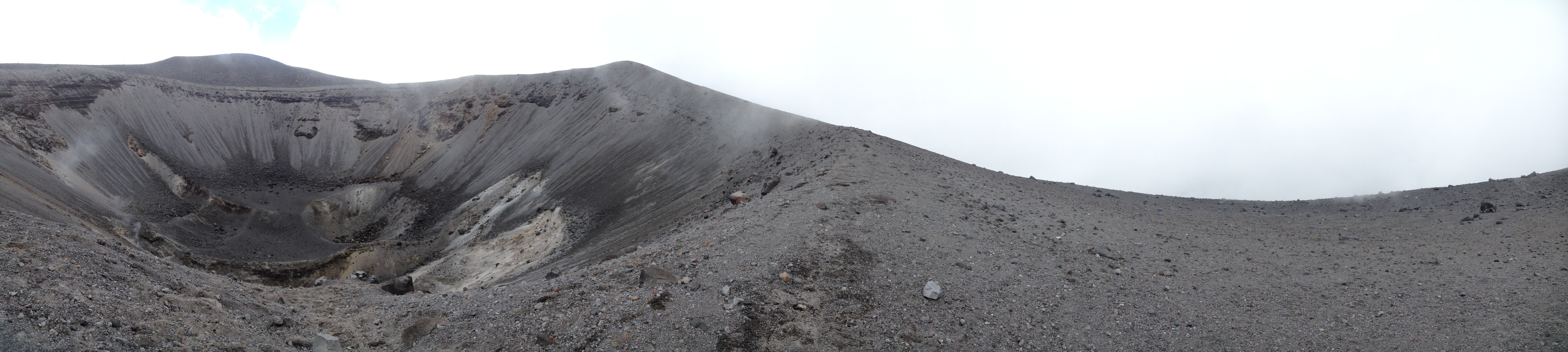
Panorama of the crater in October 2012
Major volcanoes in Colombia

== See also ==
- List of volcanoes in Colombia
- List of volcanoes by elevation
- List of mountains in Colombia
