= Colombian Massif =

Group of mountains in Colombia

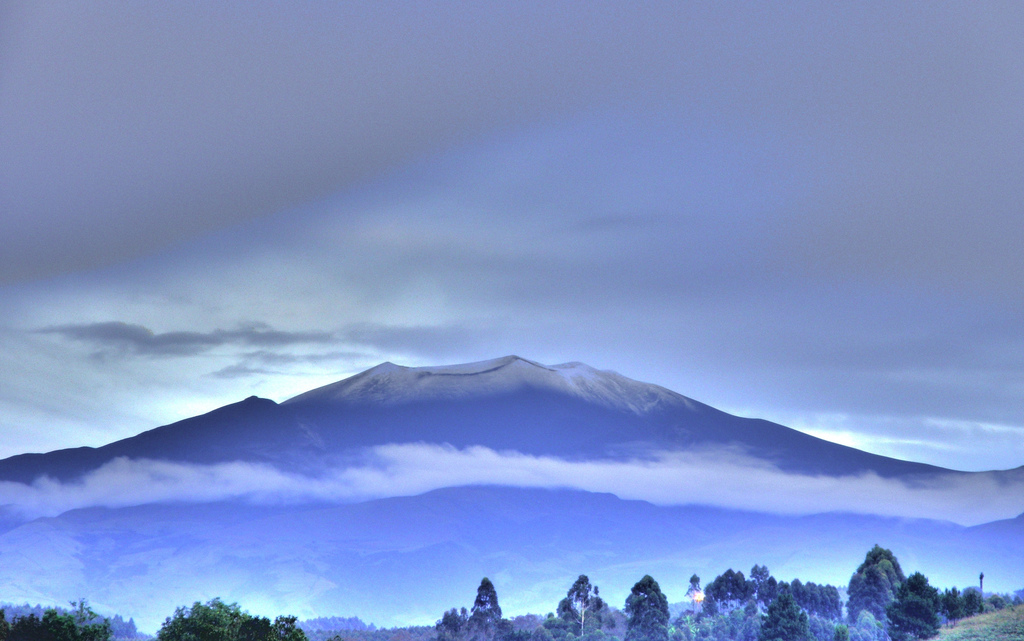
- Puracé Volcano

Highest point
- Peak: Puracé
- Elevation: 4,646 m (15,243 ft)
- Coordinates: 1°45′00″N 76°30′00″W

Dimensions
- Area: 32,682 km^{2} (12,619 mi^{2})

Geography
- Location within Colombia
- Country: Colombia
- Departments: Cauca, Huila and Nariño

The Colombian Massif (from the Spanish Macizo Colombiano), also known colloquially as Nudo de Almaguer, refers to a group of mountains within the Andes of south central Colombia. The massif is mainly within the area of the Cauca, Huila, and Nariño Departments. To the south is the Pasto Massif and to the north begins the Central and Eastern Andes.

== Geography ==
The total area is 32,682 km^{2} (12,619 sq mi), which is distributed as follows: 13,716 km^{2} (5,296 sq mi) of forests, 15,423 km^{2} (5,955 sq mi) of agroecosystems, 2,567 km^{2} (991 sq mi) of páramos, 43 km^{2} (17 sq mi) of snow zone, 924 km^{2} (357 sq mi) have xerophytic vegetation and 9 km^{2} (3.5 sq mi) of urban settlements. The altitude varies between 2,600 m (8,500 ft) and 4,646 m (15,243 ft).

This area is identified as the source of 70% of the Colombian freshwater for human consumption and irrigation. It embodies the headwaters of the Magdalena and Cauca Rivers (Caribbean slope), Caquetá and Putumayo Rivers (Amazon basin) and the Patía River (Pacific slope).

The massif contains 362 high mountain bodies of water, 13 páramos and other ecosystems rich in flora and fauna. From south to north are the páramos of Cutanga, Letero, Las Papas (Potatoes), Apio (Celery) and Buey (Ox) as well as high altitude valleys like the Valley of Potatoes (3000 m.a.s.l.) and Valley of Paletara (3000 m.a.s.l.). The Sotará and Puracé are the prominent volcanoes of the area, the latter being within the Puracé National Natural Park.

Very few people have traversed the mountains of this region because it is covered by rugged terrain and an impenetrable and cold páramo environment, both of which are natural guardians which preserve the water sources that provide water for half of Colombia before emptying into the sea.

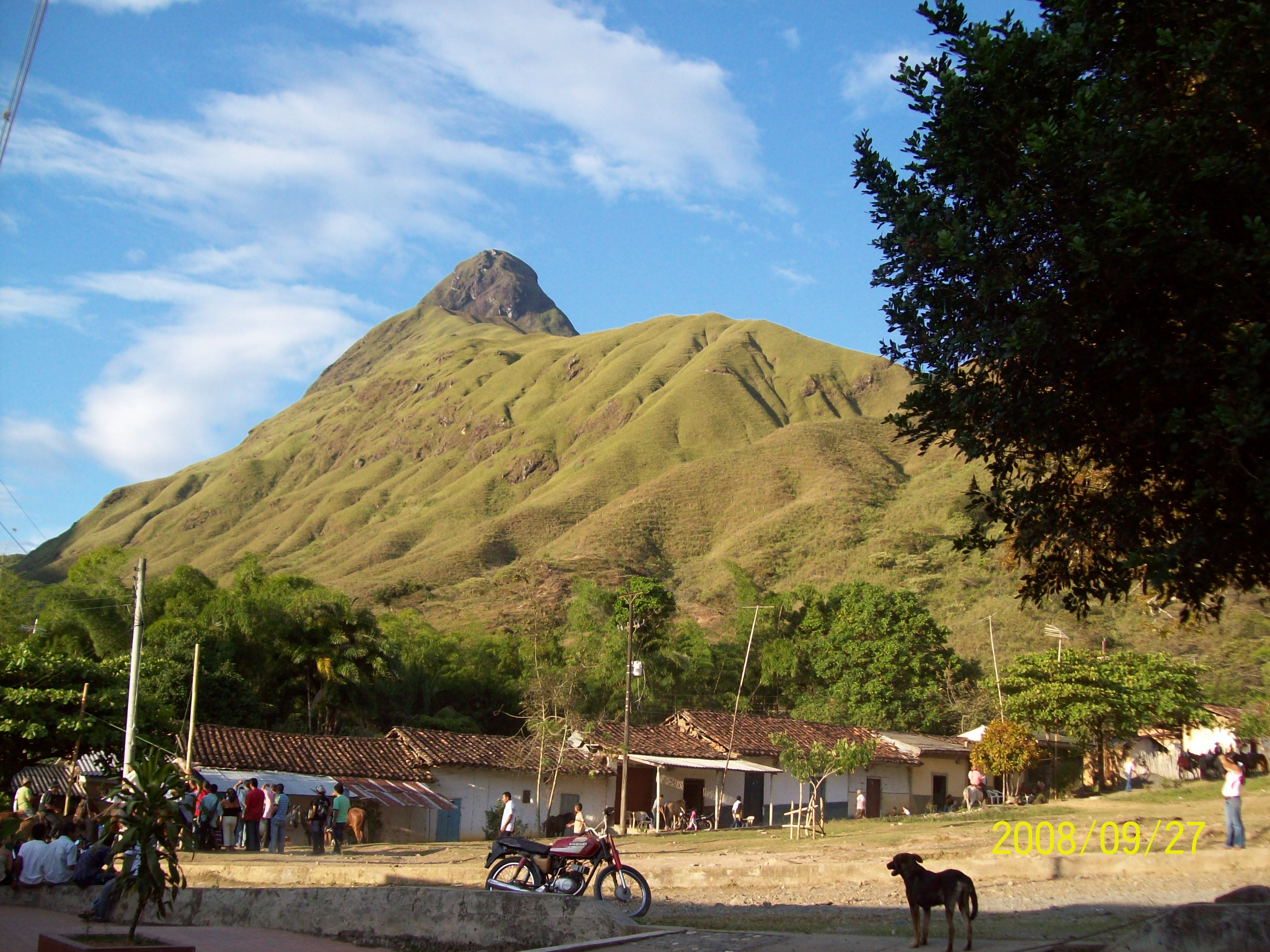
Cerro de Lerma
in Cauca

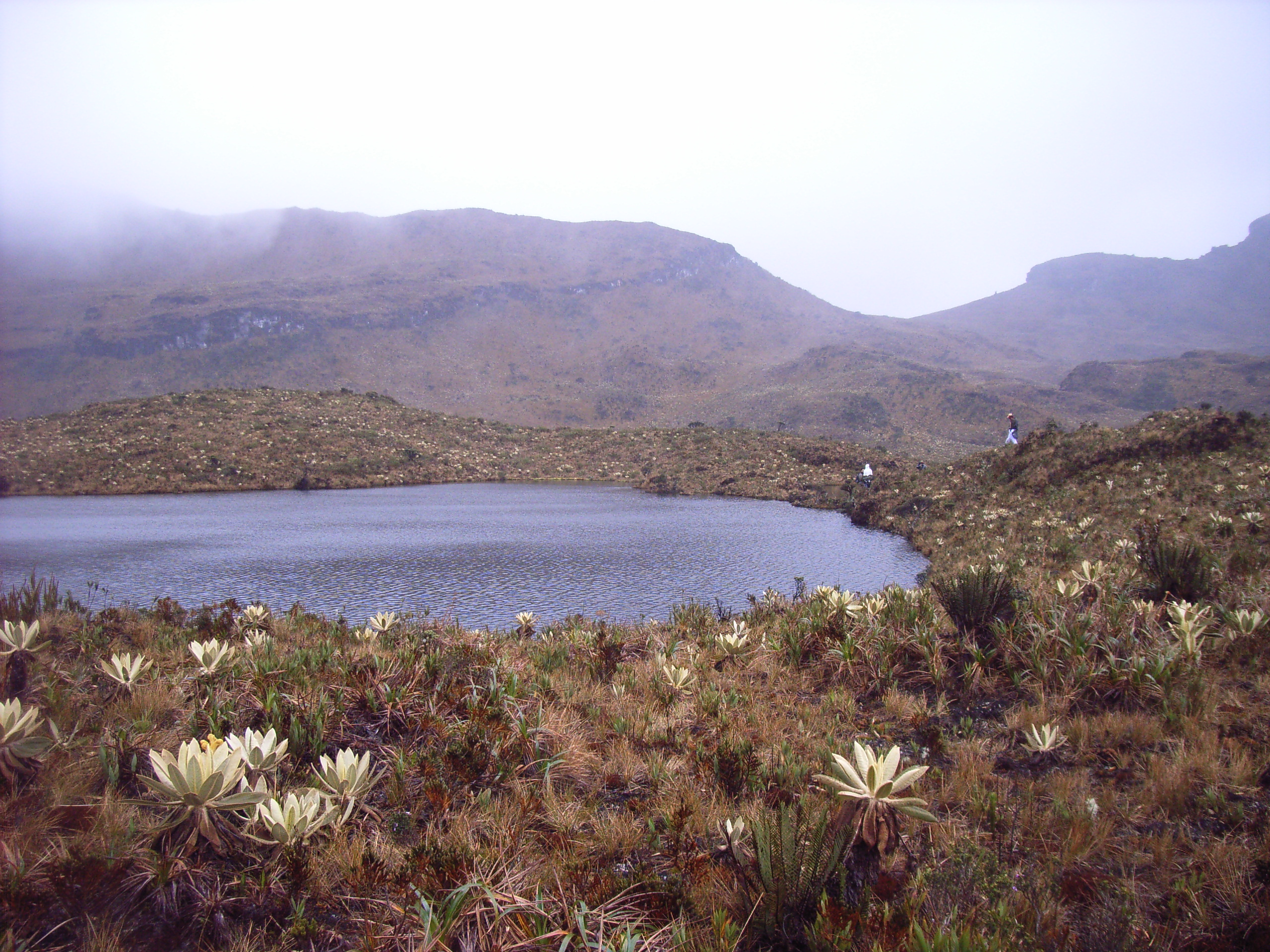
Las Reginas
