= Puracé National Natural Park =

Volcanic protected area in Cauca Department, Colombia

El Parque Nacional Natural Puracé
- Puracé National Natural Park
- IUCN category II (national park)
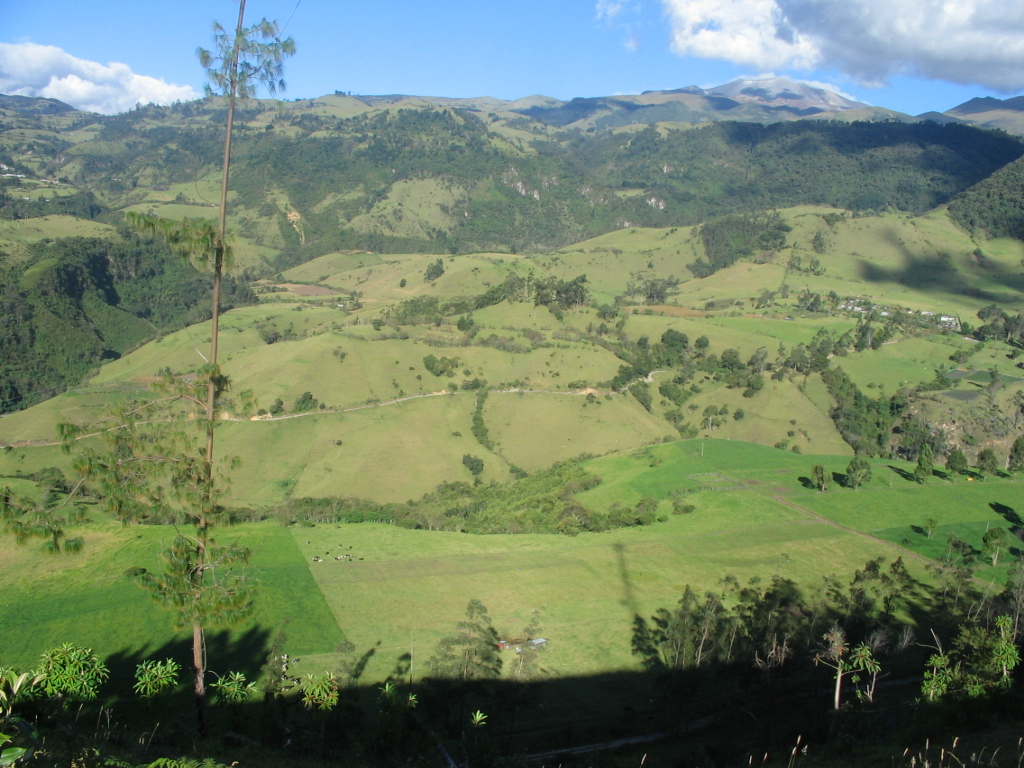

- Location within Colombia
- Nearest city: Popayán, Colombia
- Coordinates: 2°12′N 76°21′W
- Area: 830 km^{2} (320 sq mi)
- Established: 1961
- Governing body: SINAP

The Puracé National Natural Park (Spanish: Parque Nacional Natural Puracé) is a national park located in the Andean region of Colombia, southeast of the city of Popayán in the Cordillera Central range. Its main feature is the active stratovolcano Puracé, one of Colombia's most active volcanoes. Four of the country's most important rivers originate within the area: Magdalena River, Cauca River, Japurá River and Patía River.

== General ==
It was established in 1961 as the first national park in the Cauca Department. During the 1990s, the FARC guerrilla used the park as a base camp, but has since waned as a result of the 2002 military campaign against the movement enacted by President of Colombia Álvaro Uribe.

The only active volcano in the area is Puracé at 4,580 metres (15,030 ft) above mean sea level. At the foot of this volcano is the Paletará valley. In addition, there are two higher volcanoes, Azúcar at 5,000 m (16,000 ft) and Coconuco at 4,600 m (15,100 ft), and four more with an elevation between 4,400 m (14,400 ft) and 4,500 m (14,800 ft).

The way to get to the park is through Popayán, capital of the Department of Cauca, which can be reached by the Pan-American highway that connects the country from north to south. Then take the road to the town of Puracé, located at the foot of the volcano. It is 44 km long and takes about an hour. The road is in good condition. From Puracé you continue to a point called "El Crucero", and then - 1 km further - to the recreational area of Pilimbalá, in the northern sector of the volcano. Or the park can also be reached from the old Colombian police base located at 4000 meters above sea level which can be accessed by vehicle after passing through the Puracé's sulphur mines.

Starting from Pilimabalá at a medium pace and with good weather, it can take 3 ½ h to ascend to the crater. If the ascent is made via the military base, the journey is much shorter and may take around 1 ½ to 2 h.

== Climate ==
The highest daytime temperatures are between 14 and 16 °C (57 and 61 °F), and the coldest nighttime temperatures below freezing. The average yearly rainfall is 2,500 millimetres (98 in) and tend to decrease as elevation increases. Frost occurs frequently above 3,000 m (9,800 ft) and almost daily above 4,200 m (13,800 ft).

== Flora and fauna ==
Over 200 orchids and nationally threatened species such as the Colombian Pine, Andean Oak, Wax palm tree are found in the park. It is home to over 160 species of birds, of which hummingbirds, ducks, birds of prey are the most dominating. Several mammals are found in the park: spectacled bear, mountain tapir, cougar, pudú as well as the Andean condor that the San Diego Zoo helped to reintroduce in the 1990s. The lower elevation forests are home to four primates: woolly monkey, howler monkey, gray-bellied night monkey, tufted capuchin.

== Gallery ==
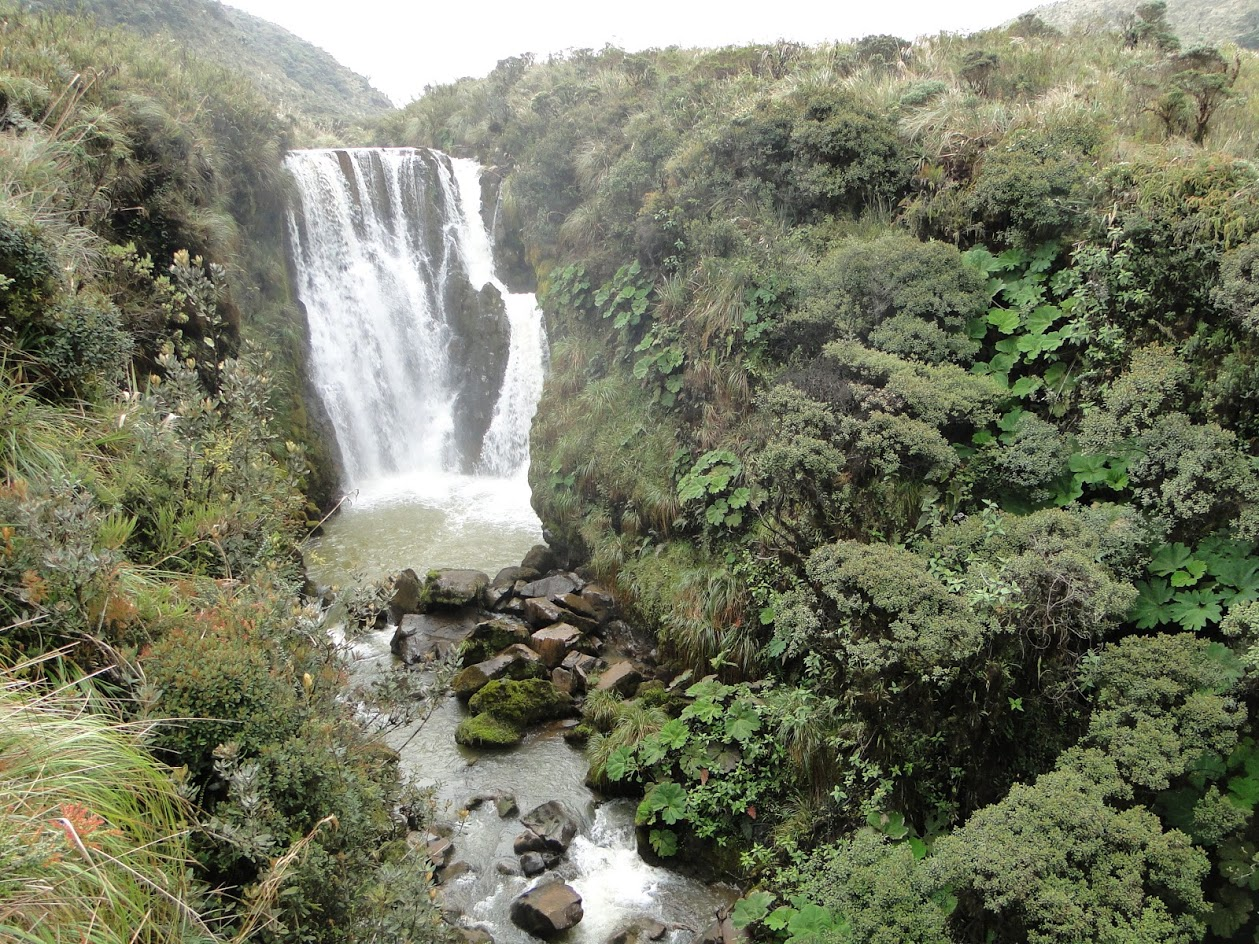

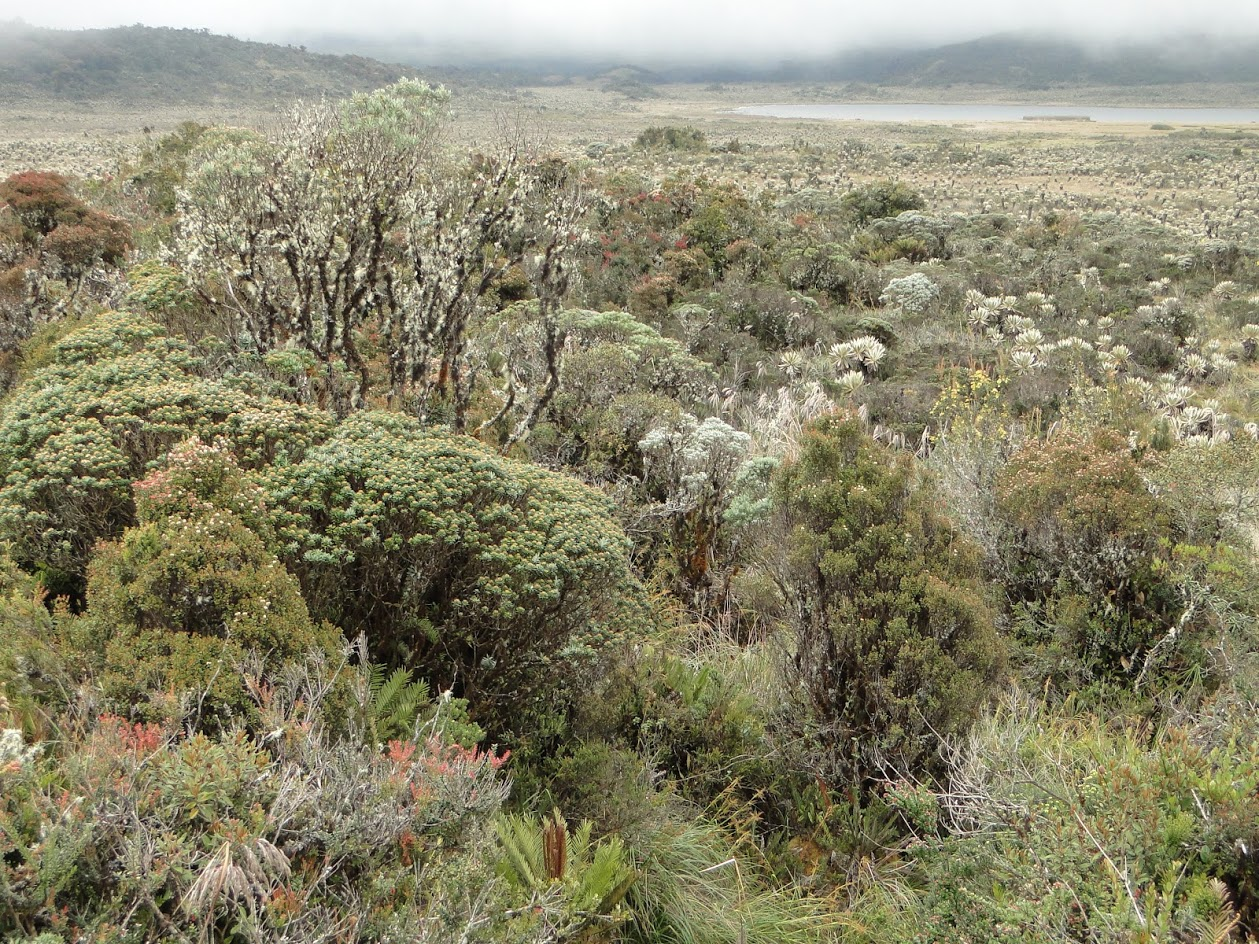

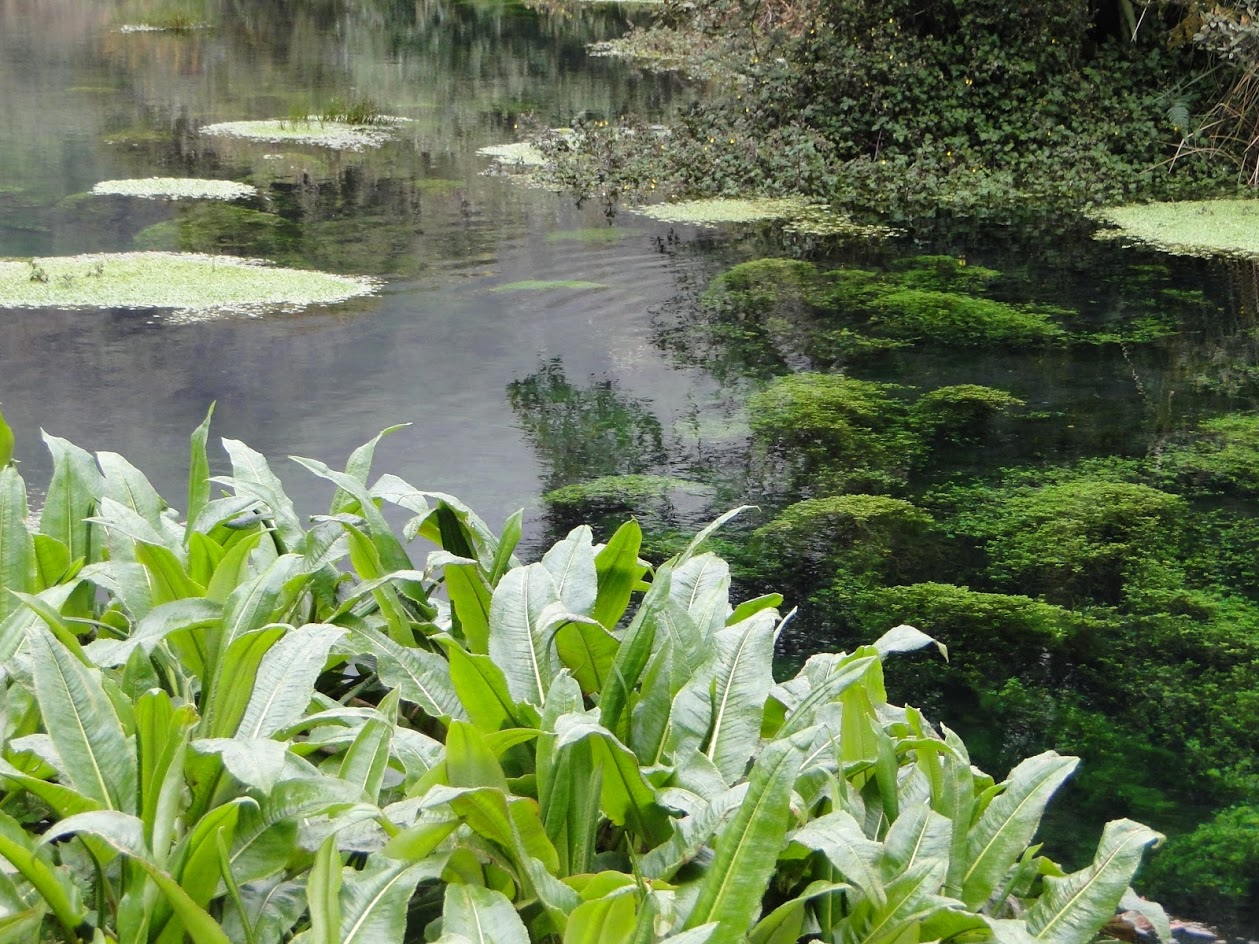

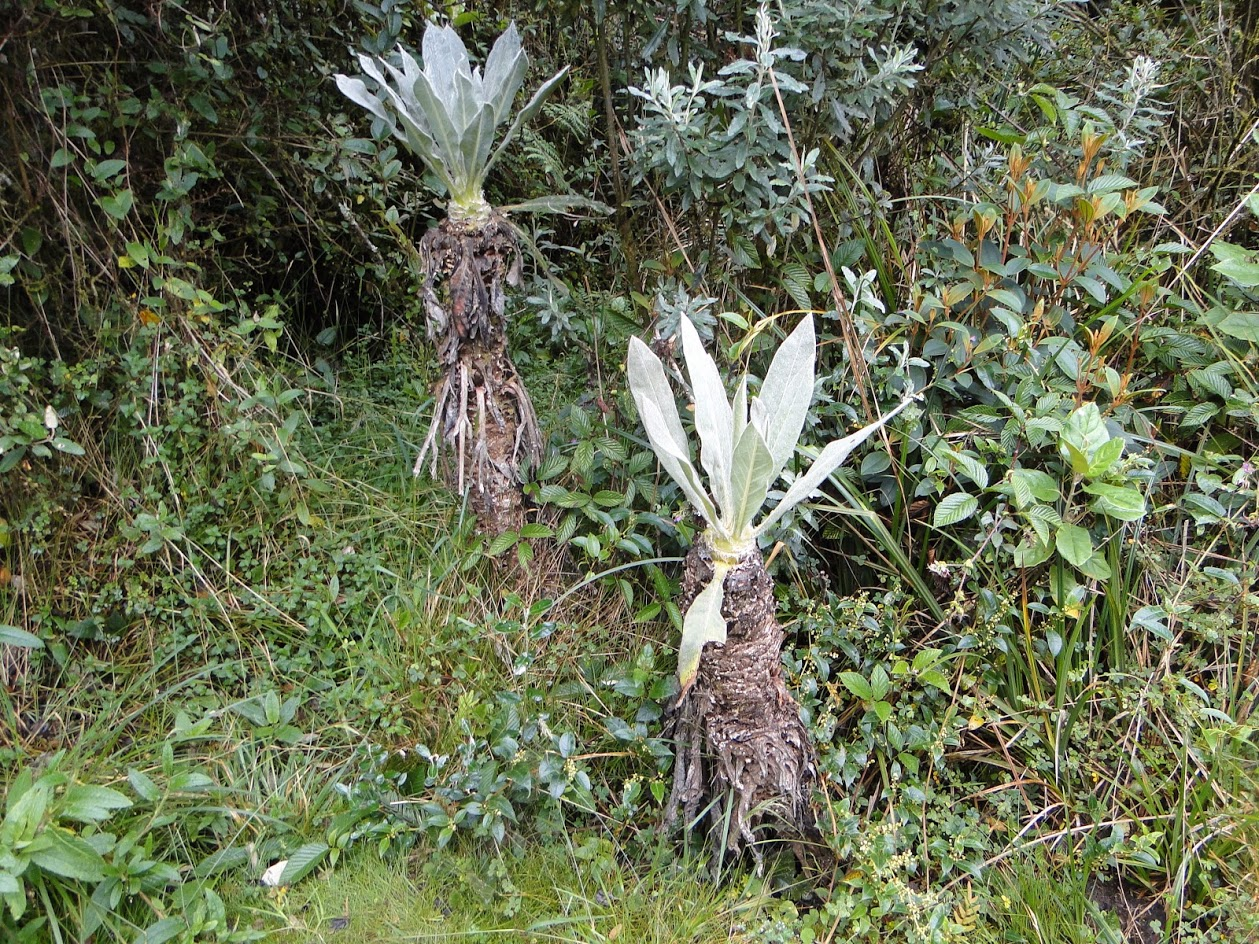

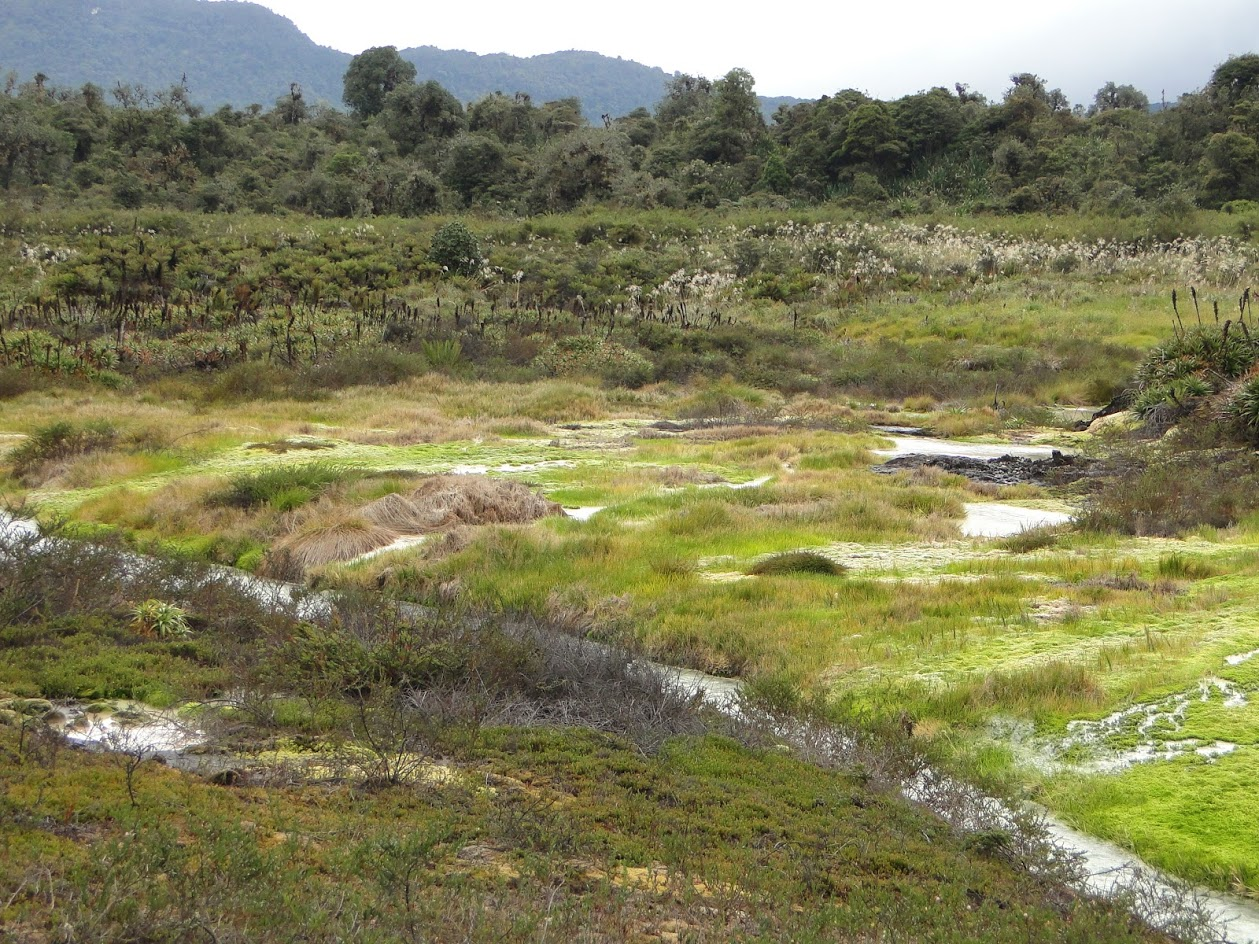

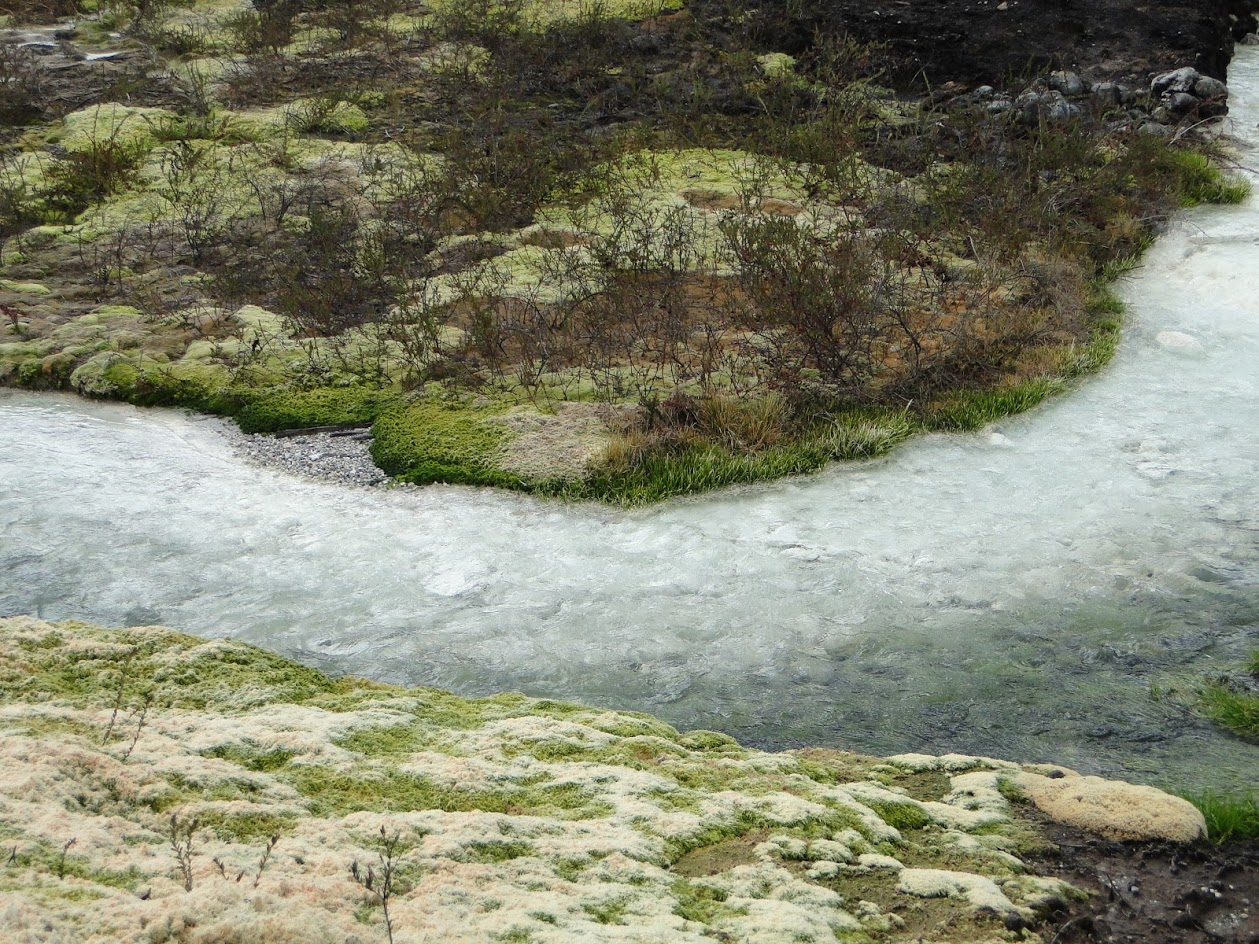

== Communities ==
The park's area serves as an indigenous reservation for the Coconuco ethnic group, in the Pilimbalá sector, where the same community offers comfortable lodging and typical food. There is also an indigenous Guambiano settlement.
