= Murshidabad silk =

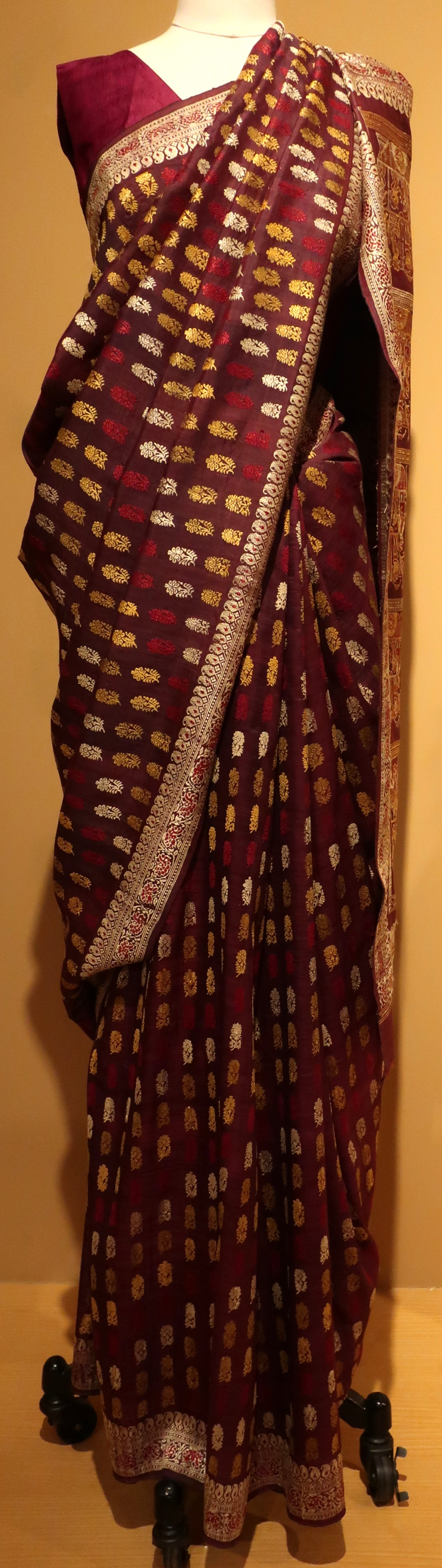
Sari from Murshidabad, West Bengal on display at Honolulu Museum of Art

Murshidabad silk (Bengali: মুর্শিদাবাদী রেশম) is produced in Murshidabad district of West Bengal. This silk is produced from mulberry silkworms (Bombyx mori) reared on mulberry trees. Murshidabad silk is known for its premium quality. This silk is very fine, light weight and easy to drape. Two famous saris produced from Murshidabad silk are Baluchari and Gorood.

Historically, Bengal was the main silk-weaving center of India. Production of Murshidabad silk began in the 13th century, and foreign traders were attracted to this silk as early as the 17th century. Silk was one of the most important products of the Bengal economy, which enriching the economy of the region.

In May 2023, West Bengal National University of Juridical Sciences (WBNUJS) applied for GI tag on Murshidabad silk of West Bengal with 11 products.

== History ==
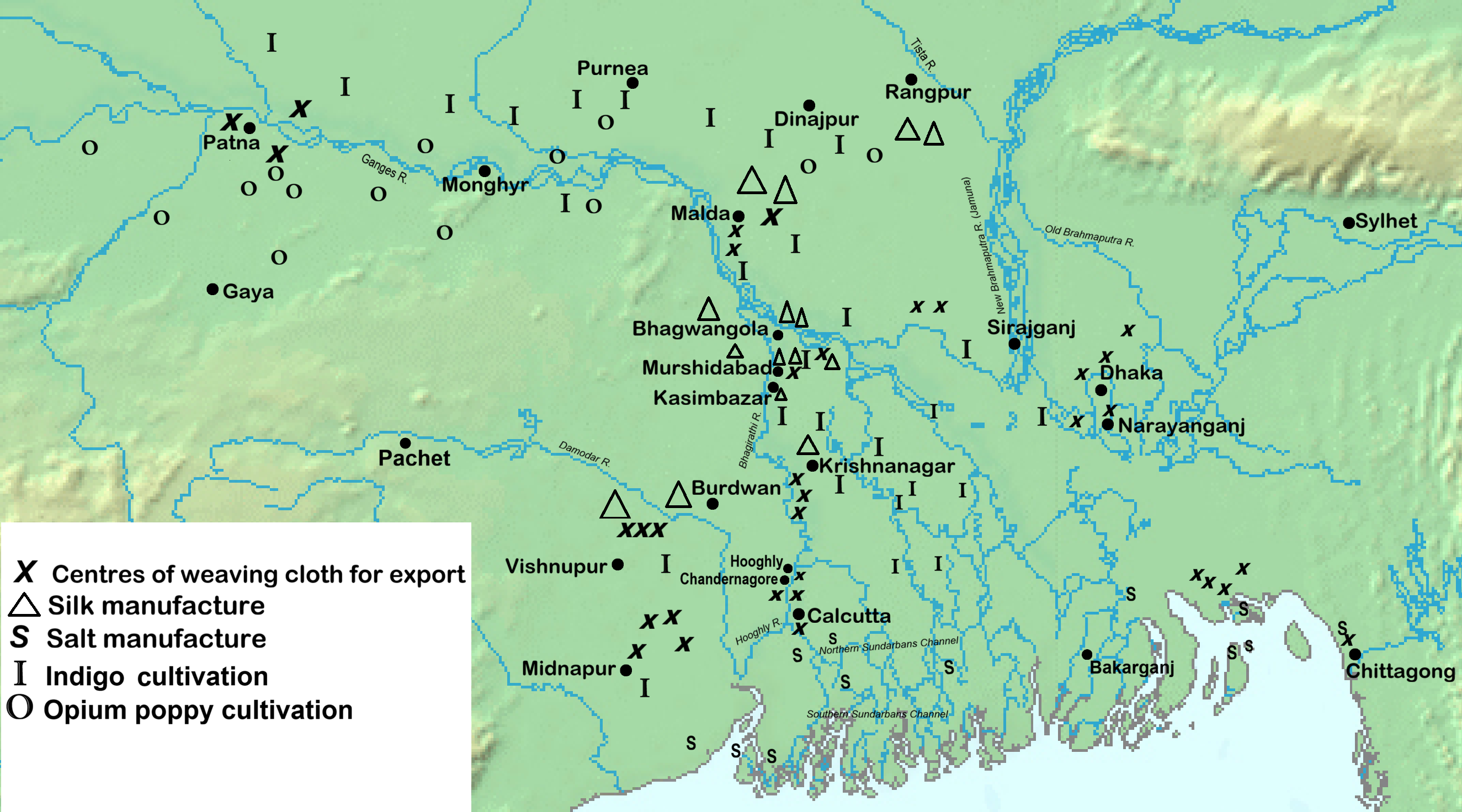
Centres of cloth weaving for export and of Bengal silk manufacture (1740–1828)

Silk production first started in China. The production of silk began in the Bengal region during the Middle Ages, which at that time came to be known as Bengal Silk. Bengal silk production areas developed in present-day Murshidabad, Malda and Rajshahi regions. In the 17th century, European merchants established kuthis (trading centers) in Murshidabad, Malda and Rajshahi, with the aim of exporting silk and silk products from Bengal to Europe. Due to the difference in the place of production, Bengal silk gradually came to be known as Murshidabad silk, Rajshahi silk and Malda silk.

Foreign traders (mainly European) were attracted to Murshidabadi silk as early as the 17th century. They started referring to Murshidabad silk as Bengal silk. The British East India Company established a kuthi in Kasimbazar in 1658 AD, with the main aim of exporting the silk produced in Murshidabad to Europe. Later, Dutch, Portuguese and French traders were attracted to Murshidabad silk and set up kuthi in Kasimbazar.

From Murshidabad, the method of silk production spread to South India. Tipu Sultan, the ruler of the Mysore state, sent an expert (1780-1790) to Murshidabad (Bengal) to study silk cultivation and processing, after which the silk industry in Mysore first began to grow.

The Nawab of Bengal was defeated in the Battle of Plassey, and later control of Bengal came under the East India Company. The company started exporting raw material from Murshidabad to Britain, as a result the silk industry of Bengal, including Murshidabad silk, began to decline. The factories were closed in 1883 due to losses. During this time the Murshidabad silk industry was headed towards destruction.

After India's independence, Murshidabad silk began to flourish with the help of the Union and State Government. Currently, Murshidabad district is the second largest silk producing district in West Bengal and third largest in India.

== Current problems ==
The Murshidabadi silk industry carries a rich historical legacy, however, it is currently going through a difficult phase. A large number of sericulture growers as well as weavers are leaving the industry. The total number of sericulture farmers and weavers in Murshidabad district was 38,040 and 25,778 respectively in 2002, which declined to 14,593 and 15,160 in 2012.

According to experts, degradation of silkworm species, various administrative and organizational problems are responsible for the decline of sericulture. Mulberry production has declined due to climate change, droughts and floods. Similarly, poor farmers who fail to get easy loans from banks are forced to produce less raw silk. Attractive job opportunities in metropolitan cities, good and timely wages and other livelihood opportunities have diverted farmers and weavers from silk production.

== Products ==
Murshidabad silk is mainly used to make saris. Murshidabad silk saree features peacock blue background with its golden border, colorful jhumko or flowing golden zari work on the anchal, decorative motifs of pure foliage, intricate weaving, and flower and bird motifs of zari. Murshidabad silk is known as 'Queen of Weaving' or 'Queen's Weaving', world famous.

Baluchari
It originates from an area called Baluchar near Jiaganj in Murshidabad district. Baluchari saris are made by Murshidabadi silk, Later, Baluchari sarees were made from cotton, while on the other hand, baluchari sarees are made from threads obtained from plants such as bamboo and banana.
Gorood
The famous Gorood sari made by Murshidabad silk. This saris is mainly produced in Mirzapur of Murshidabad district.

Jamdani saris are also made by Murshidabad silk. Apart from saris, the use of Murshidabadi silk is seen in the production of other textiles, such as Sherwani.

== See also ==
- Bombyx mori
- History of silk
- Silk in the Indian subcontinent
- Silk Road
