= Malda silk =

Malda silk is a type of high-quality silk obtained from the Nista variety of Bombyx mori, and the Japanese bivoltine silkworm, which is produced in the Malda district of West Bengal. The silk yarn produced from the Nista variety is one of the finest silk yarns in the world, as a result of which the weave of this silk is quite soft.

This silk carries the silk tradition of Bengal. In the past, the silk produced in Bengal was known as Bengal Silk or Ganga Silk. It was exported from Malda to various countries including Europe.

Currently, the Nista silk and its yarn produced in Malda have gained fame. This silk is of a bright golden yellow color and its thickness is 2-2.4 denier. Yarn made from Nista variety of Bombyx mori was recognized as a GI product in 2026 under the name Malda Nista Silk Yarn. Malda silk is in high demand in North India—especially Uttar Pradesh and South India; it is also exported abroad.

== History ==
Since ancient times, Malda has been one of the most important centres of silk production and trade in Bengal, and the silk industry was also widely renowned. Kautilya's Arthashastra, written in 321 BC, indicates that silk fabrics known as Kausheya were procured from a country called Pundariksha (the ancient name of the Malda region).

According to a local folktale recorded by Hunter, there was a trade in Malda textiles with Russia in the 16th century. Large quantities of silk produced in Malda were sent to Mirzapur and Benares through monk traders.

== Production ==
=== Production area ===
Silk is produced in all the community development blocks of Malda district. In the state of West Bengal, Malda Nistari silk yarn is mainly produced in Malda, Murshidabad and Birbhum districts. Of these districts, about 70% of the total raw Malda Nistari silk production comes from Malda.The entire region of Malda district; Khargram, Nabagram, Jalangi, Beldanga and Berhampur Sadar blocks of Murshidabad district and Bhadrapur, Nalhati, Rampurhat-1 and Rampurhat-2, Kotasur and Mallarpur blocks of Birbhum district are specifically involved in the production of Malda Nistari Silk Yarn.

== Uses ==
Malda silk, especially Nistari silk yarn, is used as a drawn yarn to make baluchari, garad, and korial saris. Malda Nistari silk yarn is exported to Bhutan, where it is used to weave traditional garments called "gho" and "kira".

== Sources ==
- Registrar, Geographical Indications (26 November 2025). "Geographical Indication Journal No-110". Geographical Indication Journal. Chennai: Geographical Indication Registry, Chennai.
- Registrar, Geographical Indications (29 November 2024). "Geographical Indication Journal No-199". Geographical Indication Journal. Chennai: Geographical Indication Registry, Chennai.
- Registrar, Geographical Indications (31 August 2023). "Geographical Indication Journal No 178". Geographical Indication Journal. Chennai: Geographical Indication Registry, Chennai.
