= Dhunuchi Nritya =

Bengali Hindu religious dance

Dhunuchi Nach ধুনুচি নৃত্য
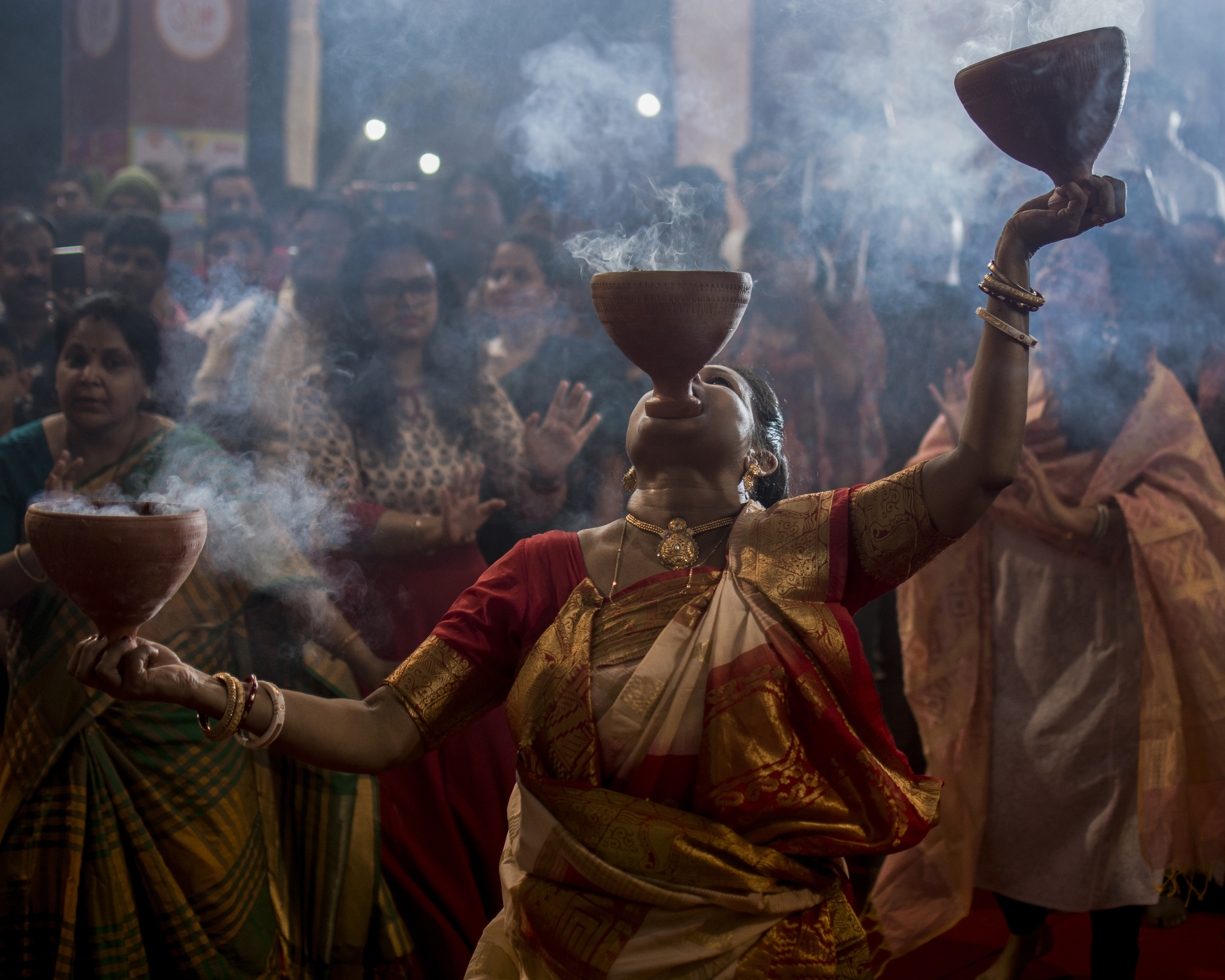
- Native name: ধুনুচি নাচ
- Genre: Folk dance
- Instrument: Dhak
- Origin: Bengal region

Dhunuchi Nritya or Dhunuchi Naach (Bengali: ধুনুচি নৃত্য), is a Bengali Hindu traditional dance. This devotional dance is performed during Hindu puja and aarti ceremonies in Bengal.

The dance is seen performed during Durga Puja by devotees, Bengali Hindus. This dance celebrates Goddess Durga's victory over Mahishasura, incorporating themes of victory and empowerment.

== Dance ==
Dhunuchi Nritya is deeply associated with Durga Puja, traditionally performed by women. The dance is usually performed during the last days of Durga Puja, especially between “Ashtami” and “Dashami”. The most important element is the dhunuchi itself, which may vary in size. Beginners hold one or two of these, while those with more expertise may use three at a time (two in each hand and one held in their mouth). The dance itself involves traditional movements where the aim is to involve the community as a whole, in the spirit of celebration.

=== Costumes ===
Both men and women usually wear traditional Bengali clothes while performing the Dhunuchi Nritya. The traditional dance-related dress for women is the garad sari, which Bengali Hindu women wear during puja or sacred religious ceremonies. Dhoti and Kurta-punjabi for men; Dhoti can be white or coloured but Kurta-punjabi is of different colours.

=== Music and instruments ===
Dhunuchi dance is mainly presented through musical instruments; song is not required. The main instrument is the Dhak, a traditional Bengali instrument. Also used are Kansor and Ghanta. Both instruments produce loud and heavy sounds. Dancers perform dances to the rhythm created by these loud sounds. It is also seen to carry gamchas irrespective of men and women.
