= Dhunachi =

Type of incense burner

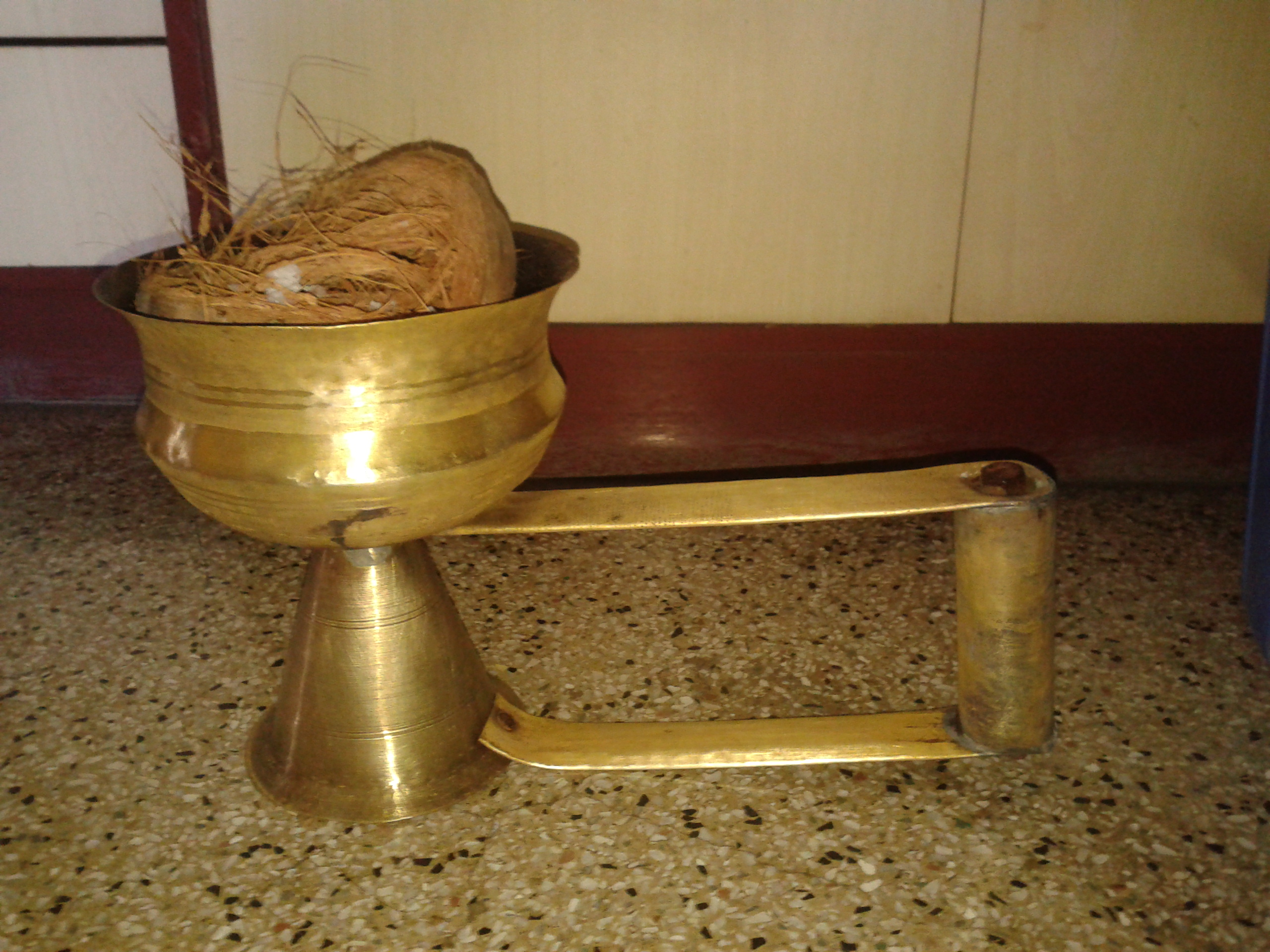
A brass dhunachi used for performing aarti in Bengali Hindu religious events, including Durga Puja

Dhunachi is a Bengali incense burner (commonly used in conjunction with Indian frankincense or dhuno (Bengali: ধুনো) for traditional ceremonies) used for one of the stages during arti (ritualised worship). It is often used following the arti with the pradip (a lamp with an odd number of wicks).

== Description ==
The dhunachi has a flared shape and is held by a stem with a large cavity at the top, and is traditionally made of earthenware. Dhunachis may have one handle, two handles diametrically opposite to each other or even no handles at all. Brass or silver dhunachi has a longer handle to reduce the effect of heat.

The earthenware dhunachis are made by potters from clay. After rendering the shape, the dhunachis are first sun dried and then burnt in fire. They may or may not be painted. Every year, potters from the districts such as Nadia or Bankura produce dhunachis on mass scale before Durga Puja. As of 2016, the wholesale price of medium-sized earthenware dhunachis in Bankura ranged between ten and twelve rupees, whereas the retail price varied between 20 and 25 rupees.

== Usage ==
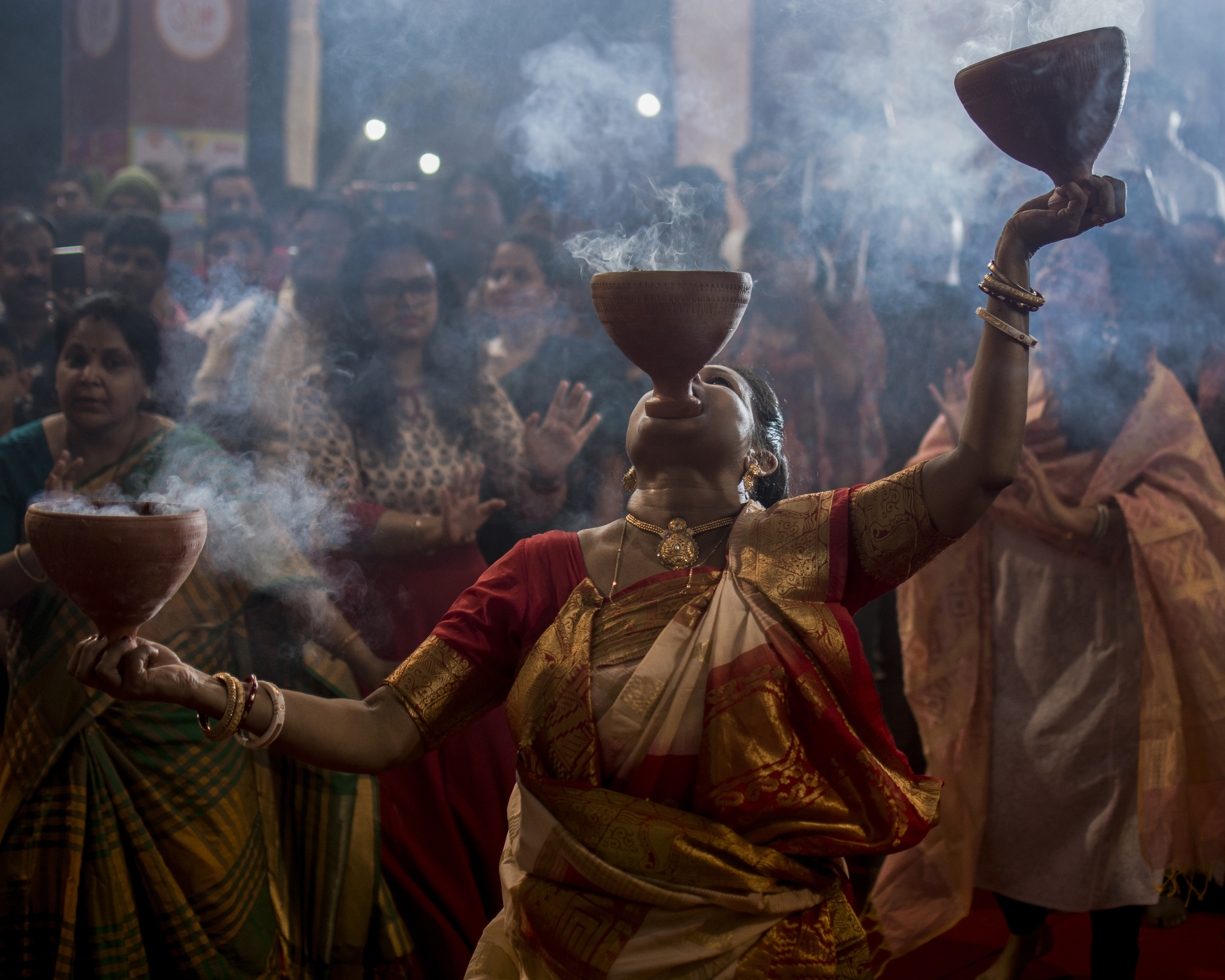
Traditional Dhunuchi dance

The dhunachi is lit by placing burning coal at the bottom, which ignites a layer of slow-burning coconut husk, on which incense (usually resin such as Indian frankincense) is sprinkled. During Durga Puja in eastern India, it is common to have dhunuchi nritya, or a frenzied dance with the censer, to the accompaniment of dhak playing. Many puja traditions also organise contests for the best dance, where some performers may go with as many as three dhunuchis - the third one held between the teeth. Dhunachi arati also known as "dhoop arati".
