= Amadpur Chaudhuri Zamindar Bari =

Heritage mansion in Amadpur, India

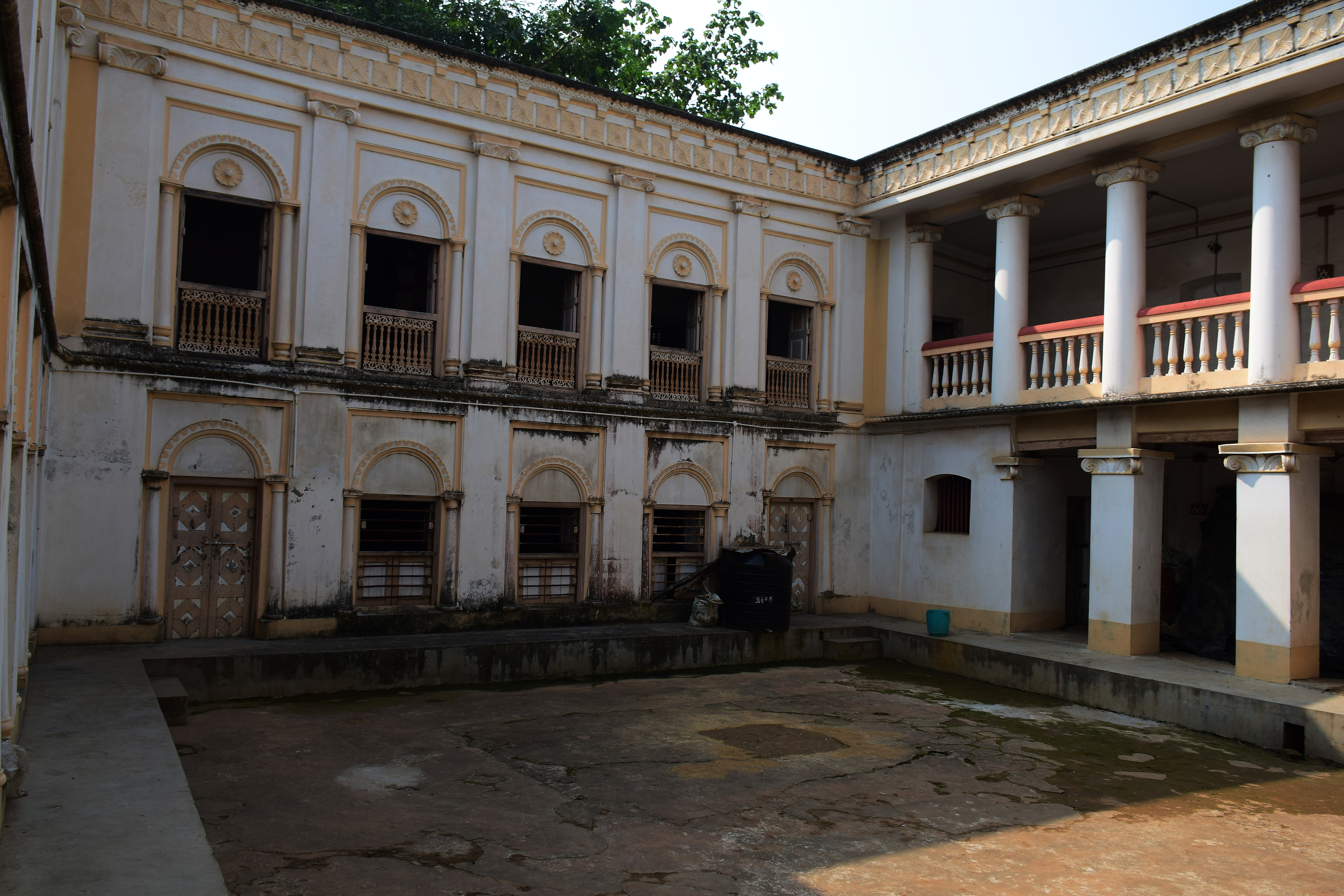
- Durga dalan of the Zamindar Bari

General information
- Type: Zamindar mansion
- Architectural style: Bengali architecture
- Location: Amadpur, India
- Completed: 17th century
- Owner: Chaudhuri family

Amadpur Chaudhuri Zamindar Bari is a zamindar mansion located in Amadpur, Purba Bardhaman, West Bengal, India. Established in the 17th century, it is the ancestral house of the Chaudhuri family. Their zamindari extended across parts of present-day Purba Bardhaman and Hooghly districts. The estate consists of a main mansion, a Baithakkhana, a Durga dalan, a Dolmancha, and several terracotta temples. The mansion features Bengali architecture.

The zamindar bari is well known for its annual Durga Puja, which has continued for more than three and a half centuries and is distinguished by several unique customs and rituals. In addition to Durga Puja, the estate also hosts other pujas like the Kali Puja, Dol Yatra, and Ratha Yatra. Parts of the Baithakkhana were converted into a heritage homestay in 2017, allowing visitors to stay within a restored section of the historic mansion.

== History ==
According to the family history, the family's original surname was Sen Sharma. Originally, their ancestors came from Tehatta. The Amadpur family lineage originates from Sribatsa Sen Sharma, who migrated to the Kingdom of Gour during the late 11th or early 12th century. In the 17th century, Krishna Ram Sen Sharma was granted the title of "Chaudhuri" by the Mughal administration after he received the zamindari of Amadpur. He subsequently settled in Amadpur. Over time, Chaudhuri replaced Sen Sharma as the family's surname. The family's zamindari was officially recognised under the Permanent Settlement of 1793 during British rule. Post recognition, their influence also extended towards Serampore.

Duhi Sen Sharma, Sribatsa Sen Sharma's grandson, was as a court poet to Lakshman Sen of the Sena dynasty. He was honoured with titles including "Kavisikshapati", "Chakravarti", and "Pandit Ratna" for his literary work Pawan Doota. Another notable member was Mohes Chunder Chaudhuri, a scholar, philanthropist, lawyer, and social reformer. In the mid-19th century, he founded Amadpur High School, which was formally inaugurated by Ishwar Chandra Vidyasagar, who is said to have been a close associate of Mohes Chunder Chaudhuri.

== Architecture and layout ==
The estate reflects the layout of a traditional Bengali zamindar residence, with the residential quarters, religious structures, and water bodies integrated within a single complex. The architecture of the mansion dispalys Bengali architecture. It is a three-storeyed mansion. Architectural features of the house include an ornamented pediment, a long veranda fitted with louvered awnings to reduce direct sunlight, carved wooden doors with decorative panels, and rainwater spouts crafted in the form of tiger heads.

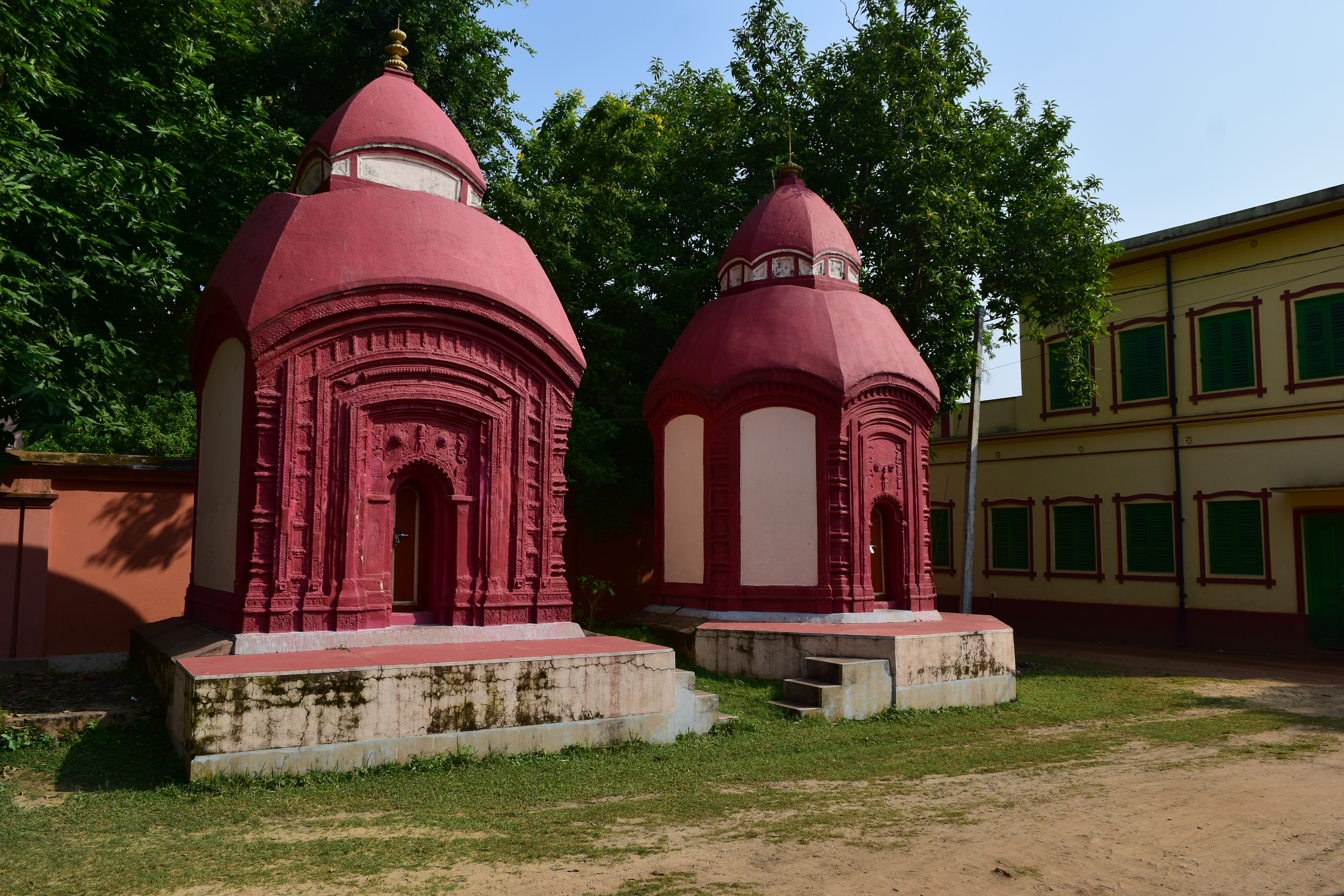
Two of the repaired terracotta temples

The Durga dalan has entrances on both sides and features high ceilings supported by wooden rafters. The estate includes a large pond, a mango orchard, a Dolmancha, and three brick-built atchala temples decorated with terracotta architecture.

Its architectural features include red-tiled floors, large wooden doors, shuttered windows, and a pond-facing sitting area. The ground floor contains multiple rooms, including a dining hall and another furnished room with antique wooden furniture, while the upper floors have ten double-occupancy rooms overlooking the pond.

== Durga puja ==
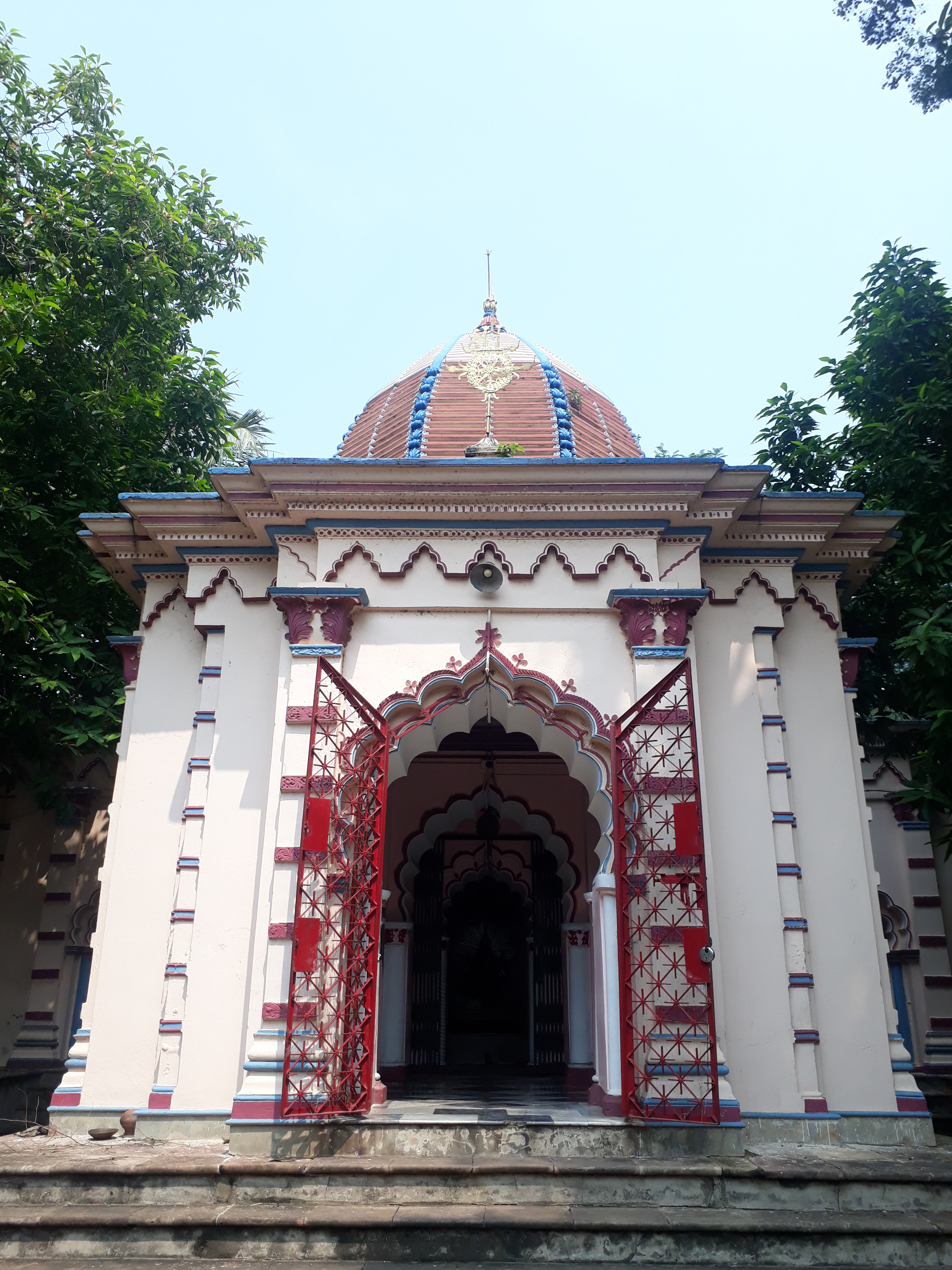
Anandamayee Temple, belonging to the Chaudhuri family

The Durga Puja at the Amadpur Zamindar Bari has been celebrated for over three hundred and sixty years. Although many descendants of the family now reside in different parts of India and abroad, they return here to celebrate the annual Durga Puja.

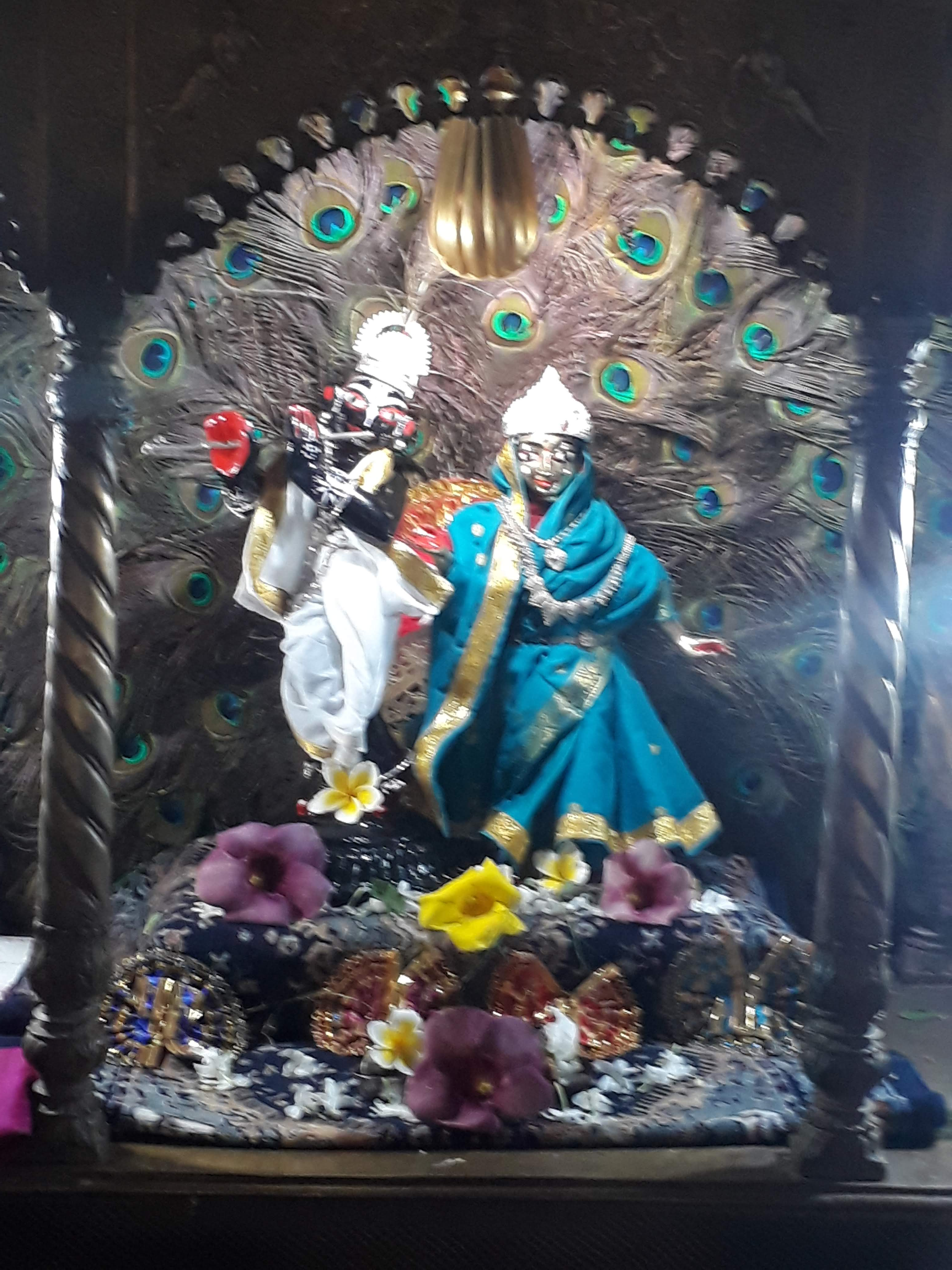
The Radha-Madhav deities

Nahabat (ceremonial music) is used and the rituals are performed in accordance with the Kalika Purana. Chandra Sekhar Chaudhuri, a descendant of Anadiram, moved from Murshidabad to Amadpur to escape the Bargis' raids. He brought the idols of Radha-Madhav from Murshidabad and established the Radha-Madhav temple. He also started the Chaudhuri family's Durga Puja. The puja was initially conducted in a room adjoining the Radha-Madhav Temple. Later, it was shifted to the Durga dalan.

=== Rituals ===
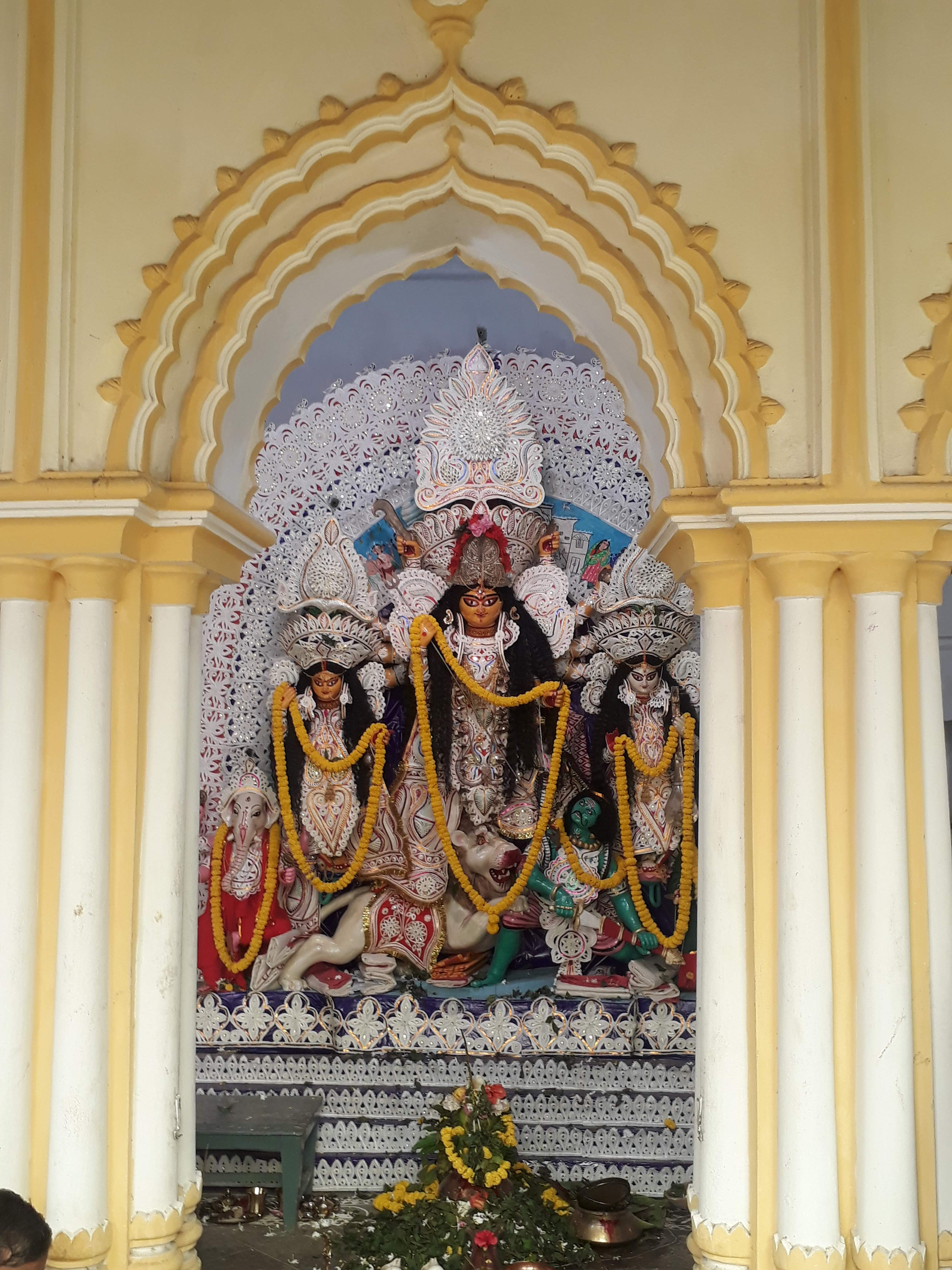
The annual Durga Puja being held at the Durga dalan of the Amadpur Chaudhuri Zamindar Bari

The Durga Puja at the Amadpur Chaudhuri Zamindar Bari is marked by several distinctive rituals. Unlike the more common five-day observance, the family's Durga Puja extends over 19 days. Preparations for the festival begin a week before Mahalaya with the commencement of rituals and daily recitations of the Chandi mantras. The festivities begin with the sound of the dhol and performances of shehnai, rather than the more commonly used dhak. The goddess is offered fourteen varieties of traditional sweets. Sugarcane is offered as a symbolic substitute for animal sacrifice. The idols of Lakshmi and Saraswati don't have their conventional mounts. Chandmala ornaments are not used for decorating the idols.

On the morning of Shashthi, women of the Chaudhuri family traditionally collect small quantities of rice and lentils from neighbouring households. These are ground into a paste and used to create alpana in the Durga Dalan. The goddess is ceremonially invoked on the evening of Shashthi, while the Kolabou ritual is performed on Saptami. Sandhi Puja is marked by the bursting of fireworks. On Vijaya Dashami, the family organises a community meal for the villagers. On the day of the immersion, torchlight processions and performances by local Adivasi dancers accompany the ceremonial carrying of the idol through the village before its immersion.

== Ratha Yatra and other festivals ==
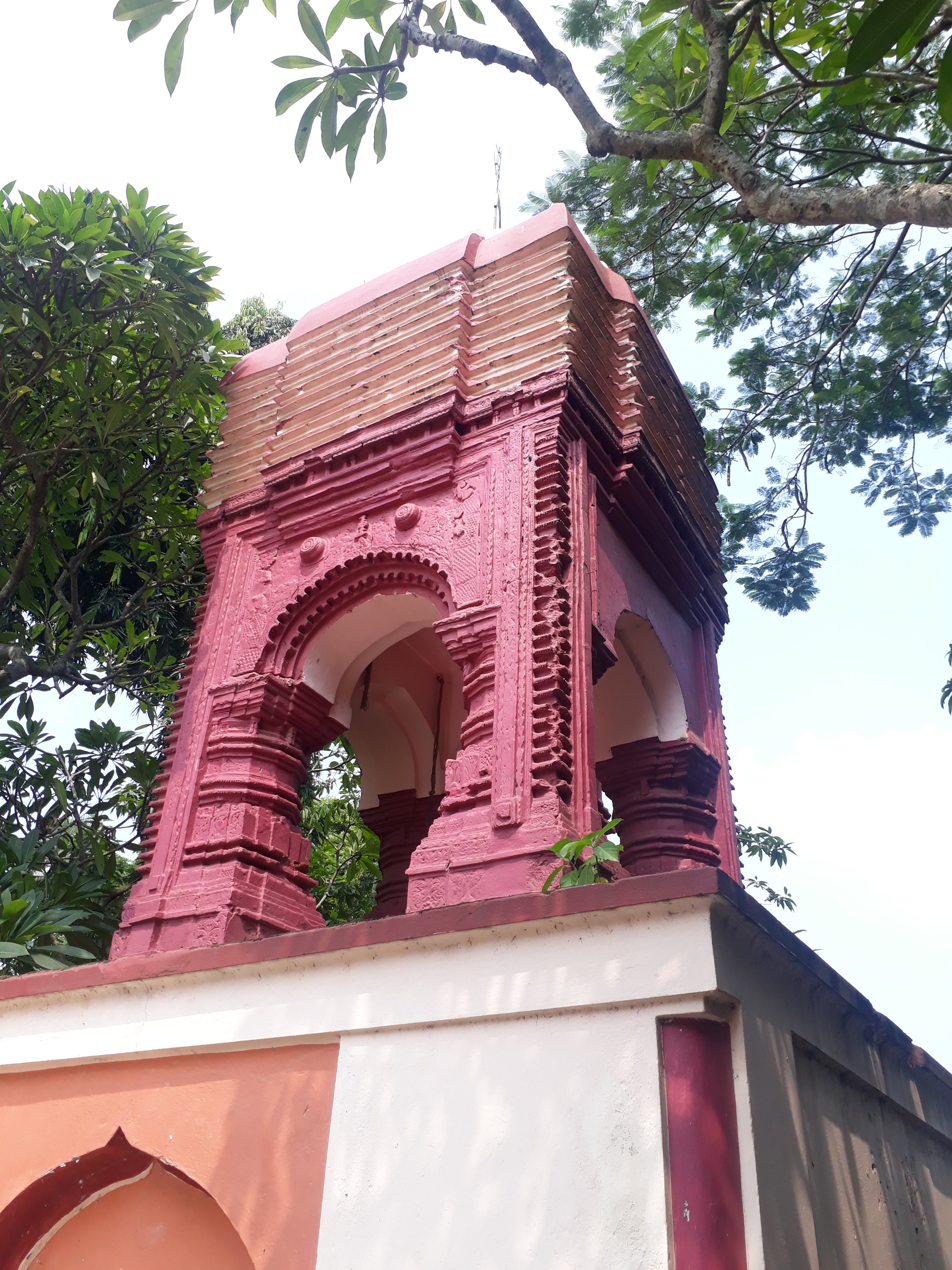
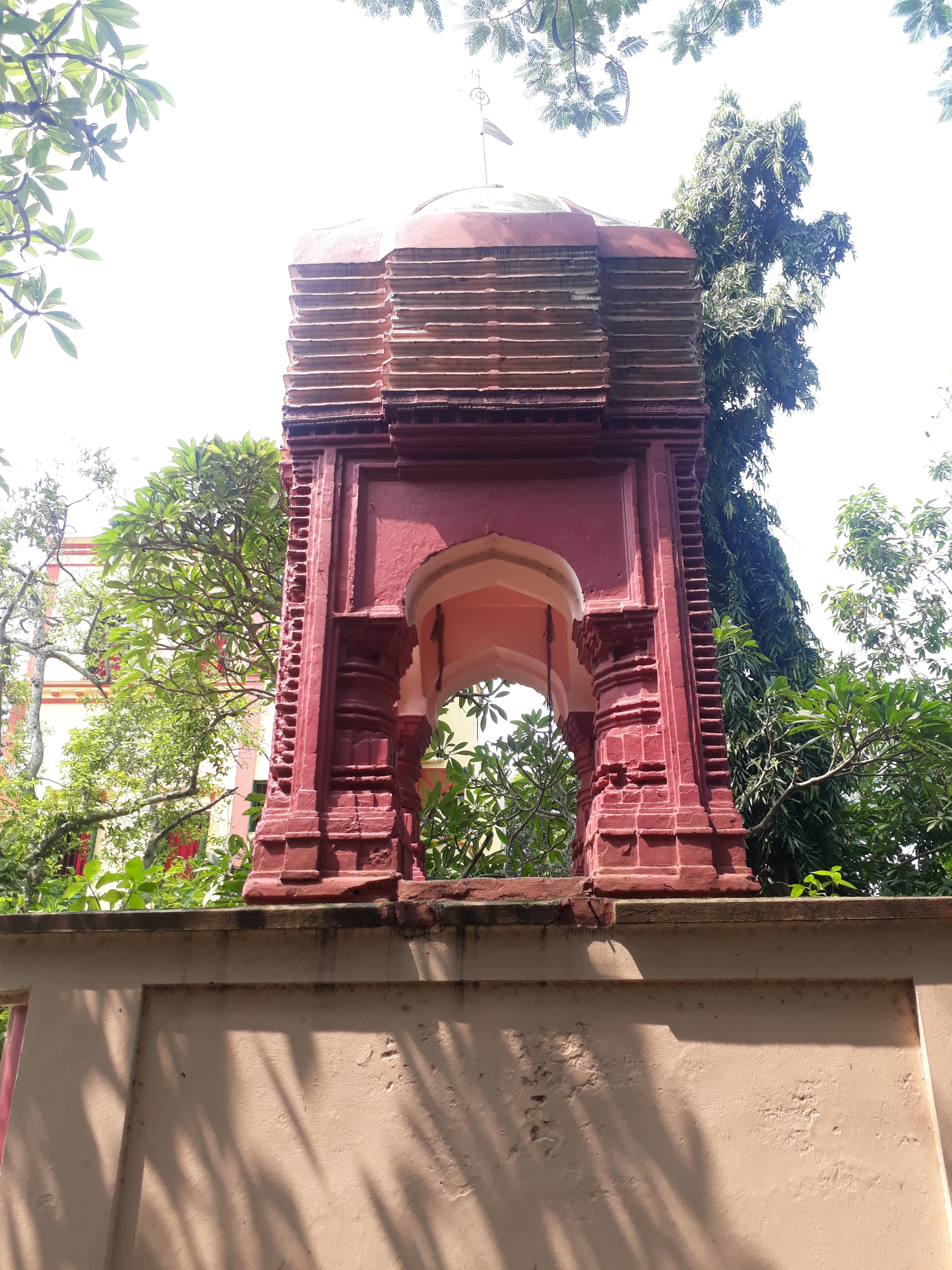
The Dolmancha of the Chaudhuri family, located within the temple complex of the Amadpur Chaudhuri Zamindar Bari

Kali Puja, Kartika Puja, Saraswati Puja, Dol Yatra, and Ratha Yatra are also celebrated annually at the estate. Adjacent to the Baithakkhana stands the family's atchala Radha Madhav Temple, built in 1739 and dedicated to the family's presiding deities. A later-built Natmandir blocks most of the temple's terracotta decoration. Only the pillars and lower panels are visible. During the annual Dol Utsav, the Radha-Madhav deities are taken from the Radha Madhav Temple to the nearby Dolmancha.

As part of the tradition, mud collected from the wheels of the Radha-Madhav chariot is symbolically used in the preparation of the first clay framework of the Durga idol. At the Durga dalan, a symbolic puja is performed in front of the newly made framework of the Durga idol.

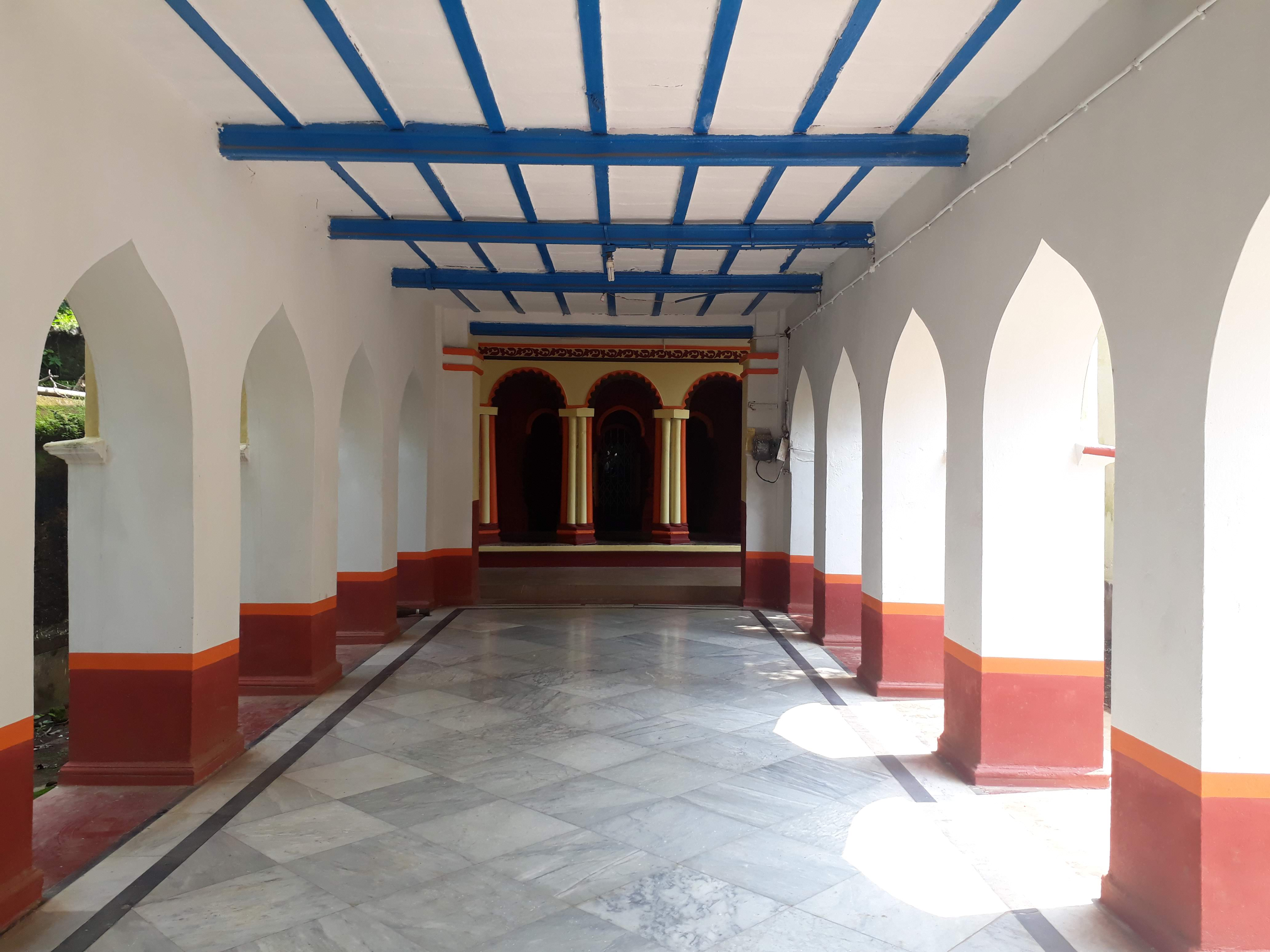
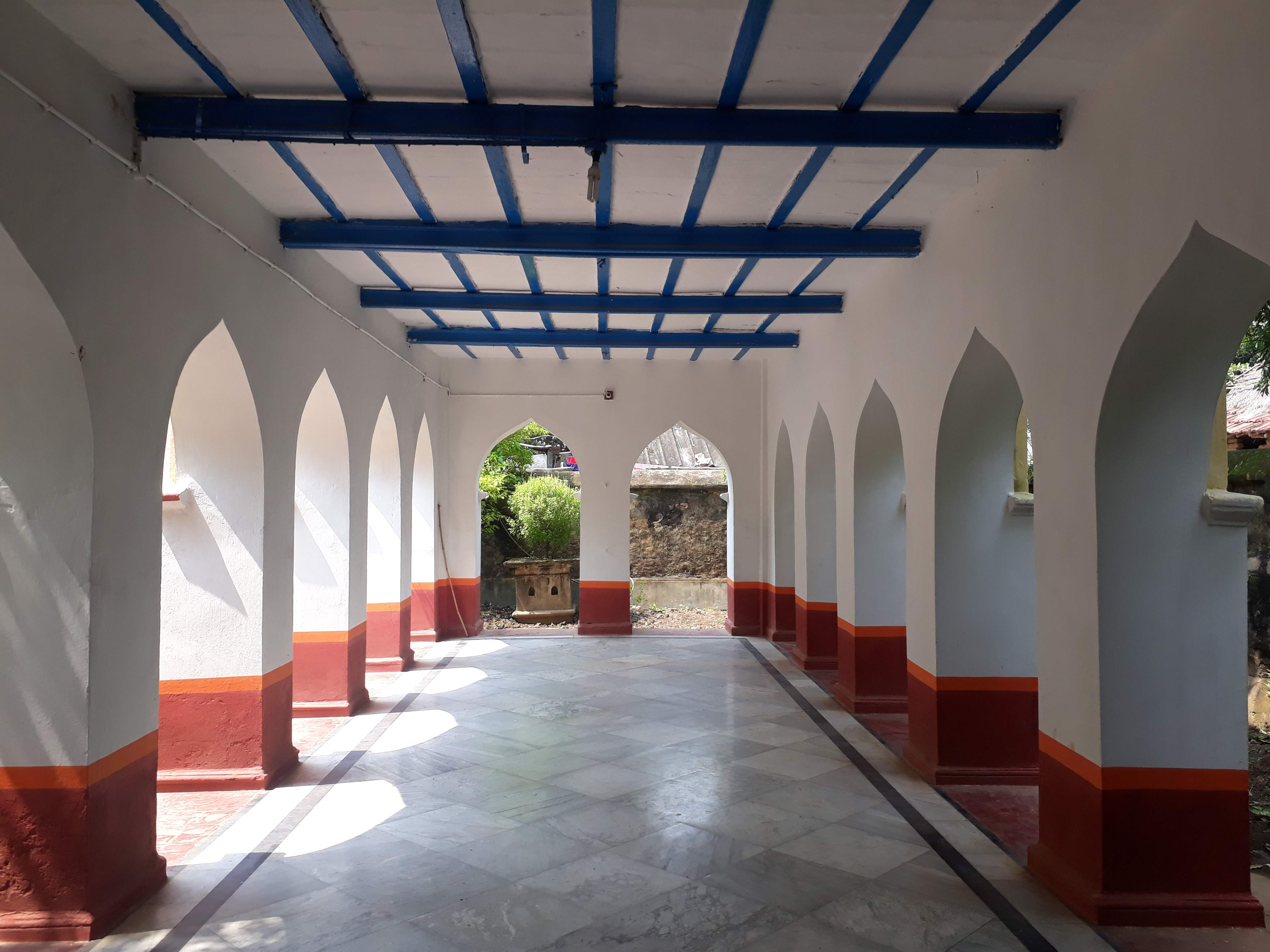
The Radha-Madhav Temple

During the annual Ratha Yatra, the family's presiding deities, Radha Madhav, are brought from the adjacent Radha Madhav Temple to the chariot. This ritual is accompanied by dhak and shehnai music, and the blowing of conch shells. Then, the devotees pull the chariot through the village. The previously existing 13-spired chariot was replaced by a new one in 2001. A village fair is also held during the festival

== Restoration efforts ==
The 18th and 19th-century terracotta temples have been repaired. But full-fledged restoration hasn't been done due to the lack of specialised craftsmanship and the high costs. The new tiles that were installed, had designs of floral motifs, animal figures, and scenes from everyday life to reflect the style of the original terracotta ornamentation.

== Heritage homestay ==
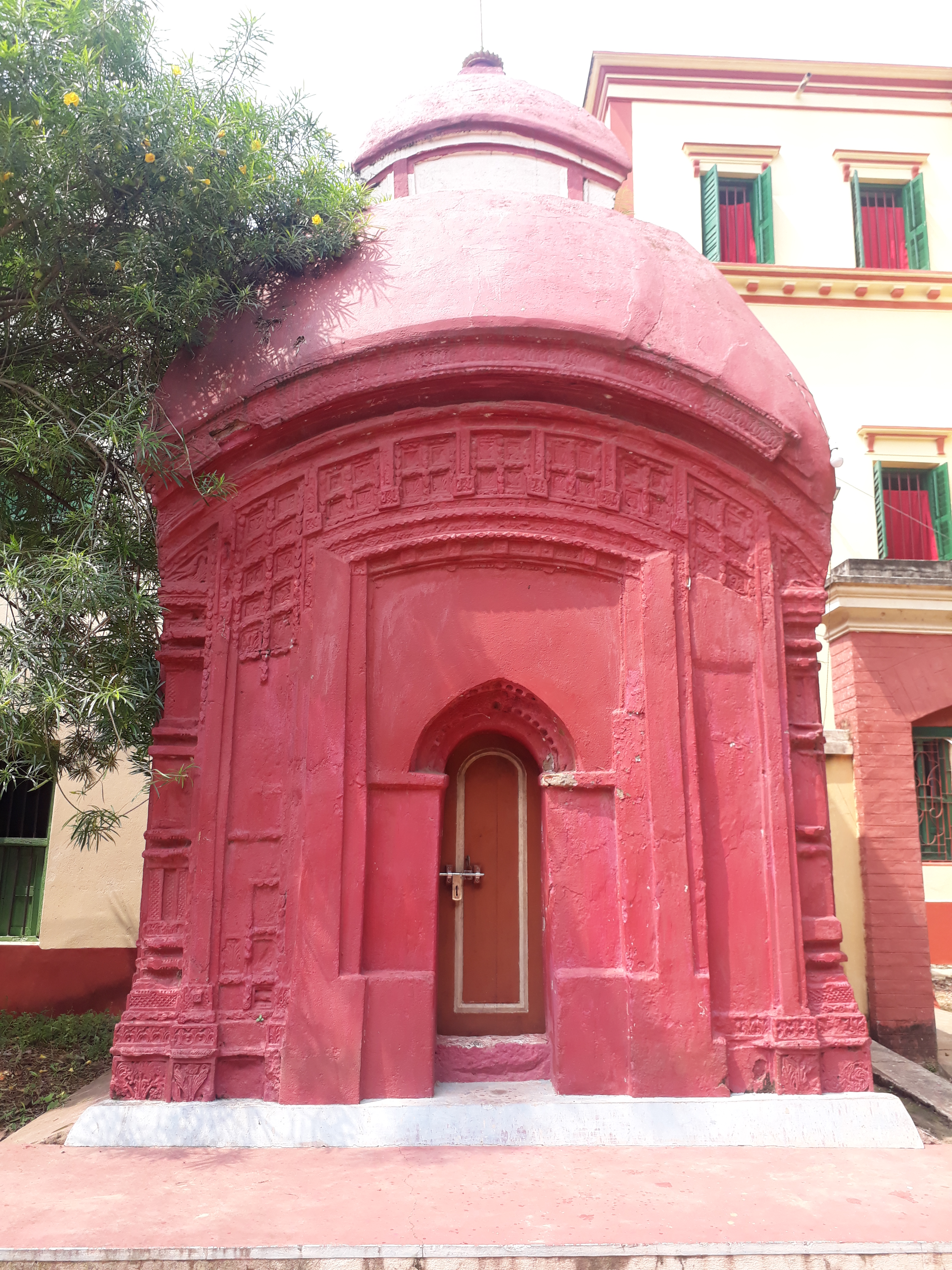
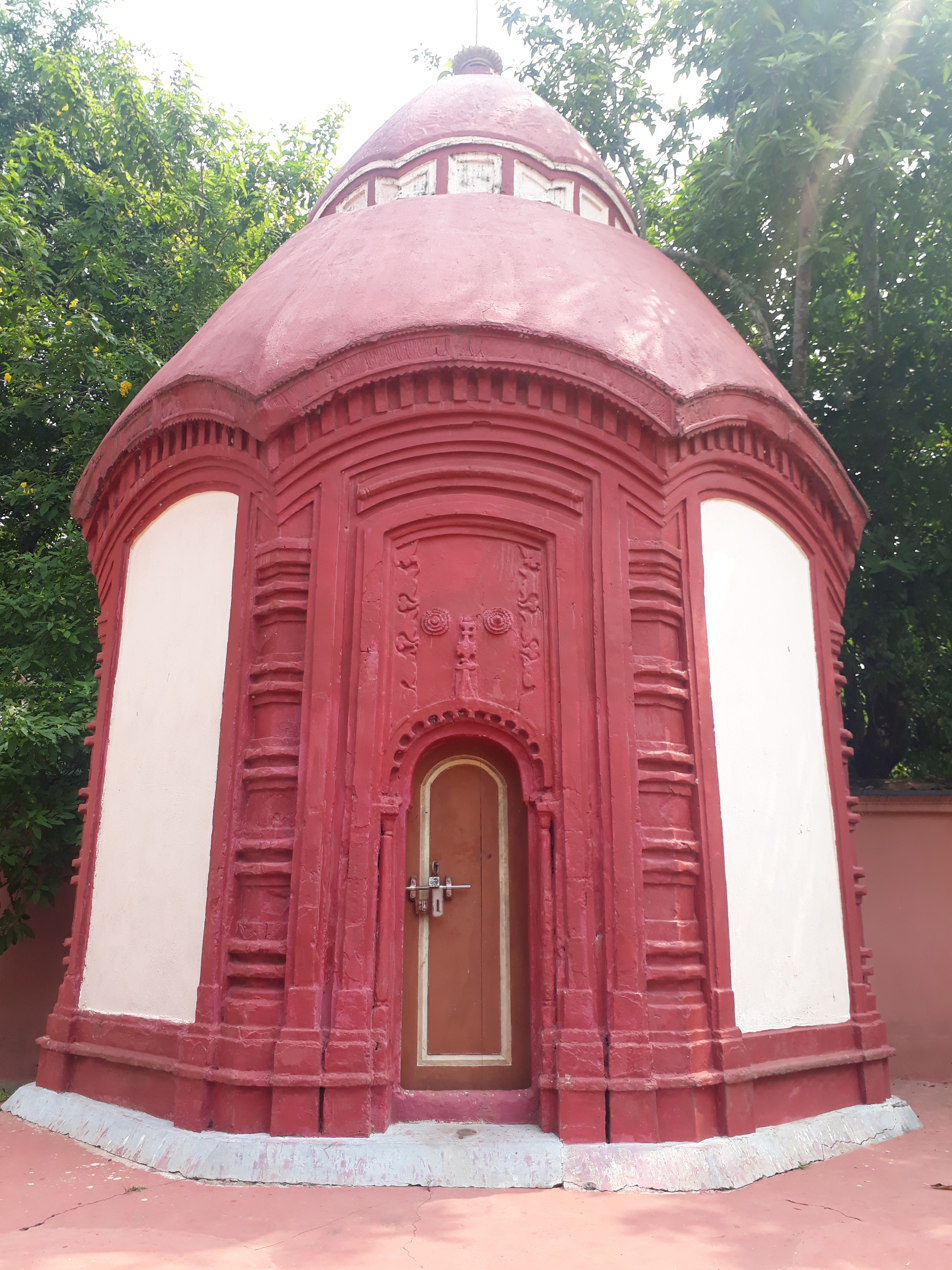
Teracotta temples within the estate

In 2017, part of the property was converted into a heritage homestay by Shiladitya Chaudhuri, one of the members of the Chaudhuri family. Accommodation is provided in six rooms on the first and second floors of the mansion. Some of the original architecture like high ceilings supported by wooden rafters and 32 inches thick walls have been retained in those rooms. The rooms are fitted with old-day long-hanging ceiling fans. Some of the elevated beds are fitted with wooden steps for easier access.
