= Garad sari =

Traditional handwoven cotton sari of West Bengal

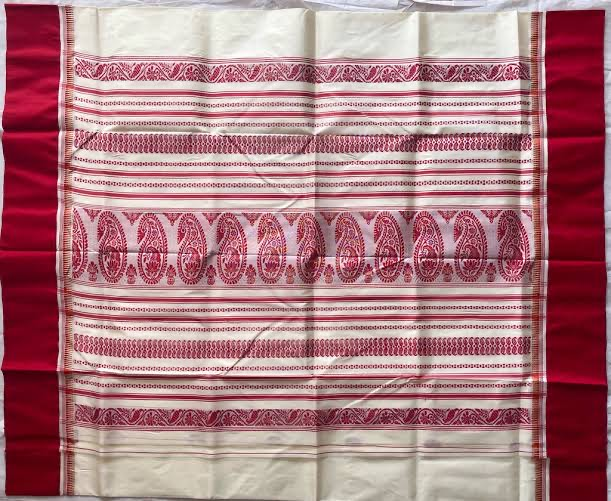

Production area
- Country: India
- State: West Bengal
- Location: Mirzapur

Details
- Origin place: Murshidabad and Birbhum, West Bengal
- Ingredients: Silk
- Length: 5.5–6.5 m (18–21 ft)
- Breadth: 1.2 m (3 ft 11 in)
- Style: Bengal tradition
- Borders: 10–18 cm (4–7 in)
- Usage: Festival

Status
- GI Status: Registered
- Application no.: 703

Garad sari (Bengali: গরদ শাড়ি) is a traditional handwoven sari of West Bengal. It is produced in Murshidabad and Birbhum districts of West Bengal. Mrityunjay Sarkar, a weaver of Mirzapur, is the inventor of this famous sari. This handloom sari is famous for the beautiful delicate designs on the anchal and "butti", the use of 100% pure silk in the weave and the sari fineness of the fabric. In 2024, Garad Saree received recognition as a Registered Geographical indication.

This sari is traditionally woven on fly shuttle pit looms using 90-92S silk yarn and golden zari yarn. Plain border and ground, or additional warp J/C or jala designs on the border and ground are observed on saris. In the past, the sari had no design on the border, body and aanchal, and this sari was a symbol of holiness, purity and good shine. Even at present, Bengali Hindu women wear this sari during pujas, especially during the Ashtami puja of Durga Puja and the Sindur khela on the day of Bishorjan. The specialty of the Garad sari is that it is given a simple traditional Kha'i Māṛa or Khai Finish and finally folded into a special shape called pat.

The weaving community of Raghunathganj and Murarai regions, make these saris. As of 2024, more than 600 looms are involved in Garad sari weaving in Murshidabad and Birbhum districts of West Bengal. In the financial year 2018–19, Garad saris with a value of ₹149.6 million (equivalent to ₹190 million or US$2.0 million in 2023) crore were traded.

== History ==
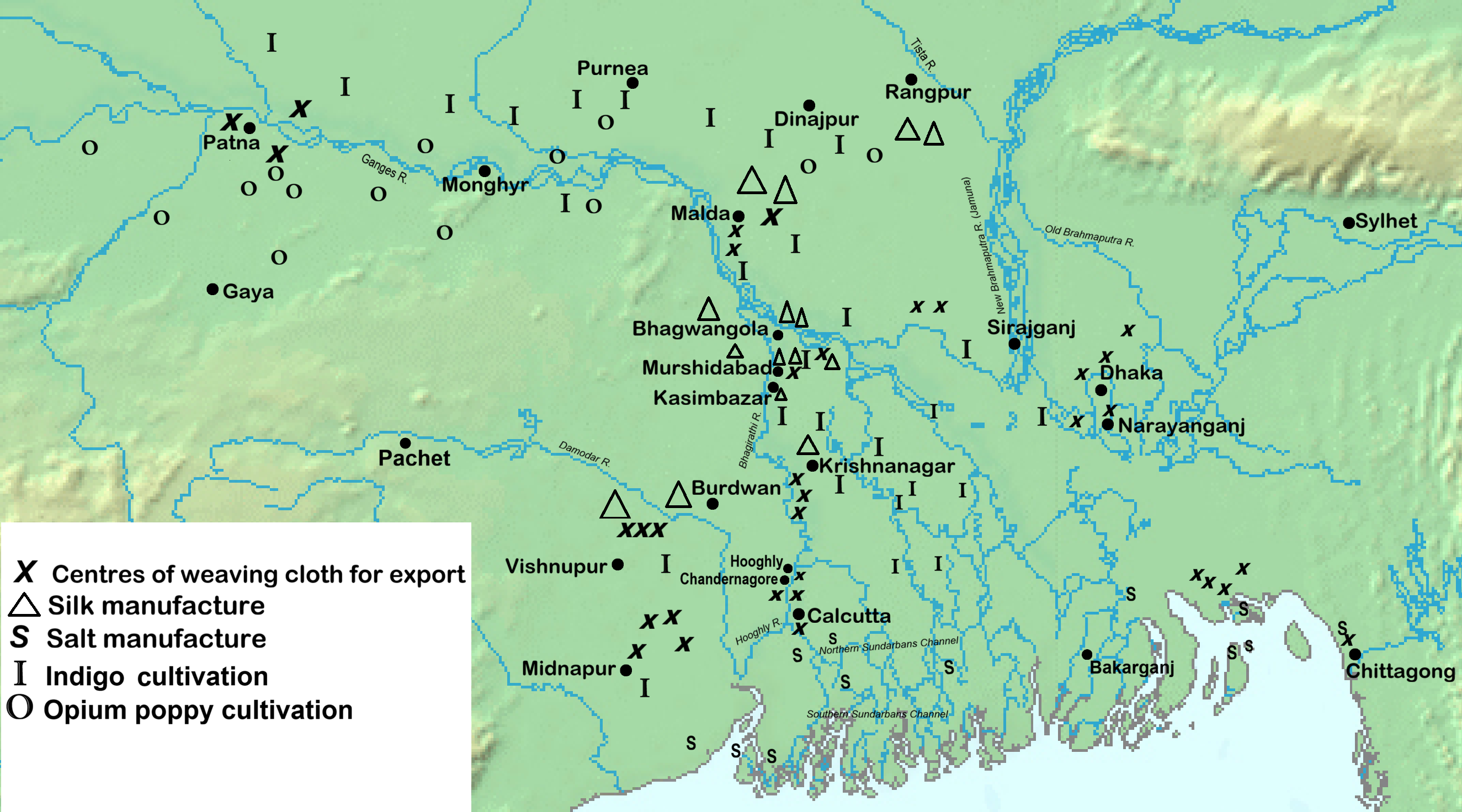
Centres of cloth weaving for export and of Bengal silk manufacture (1740–1828)

The silk industry of Murshidabad district is quite old, silk industry has been the main industry for the last three centuries. The district was famous for silk during the pre-British period. At that time, the main center of the silk industry was Cossimbazar in Murshidabad, where the company opened a factory around 1658 AD. Initially, factory operations were limited. Cossimbazar was the general silk market of Bengal; from here it was exported to a large part of Asia.

Garad weaving started in the late 19th century. This sari was first woven in Mirzapur in the present Murshidabad district. This famous cloth was invented by Mrutynjoy Sarkar, a weaver from Mirzapur. In the past this sari was a symbol of aristocracy. Saswankosekhar Gambhira, Monoranjan Posti, Shyam Sahana and Manindra Biro of Mirzapur won for their garad weaving skills in various competitions and exhibitions.

Politician Padmaja Naidu was the Governor of West Bengal between 1956 and 1967, wearing only Shyam Sahana's woven Garad Saree. Since then, these saris also became popular as "Padmaja" after the name of the former Governor of Bengal. Also, Indira Gandhi, first woman Prime Minister of India, regularly procured saris from Mirzapur.

== Gallery ==
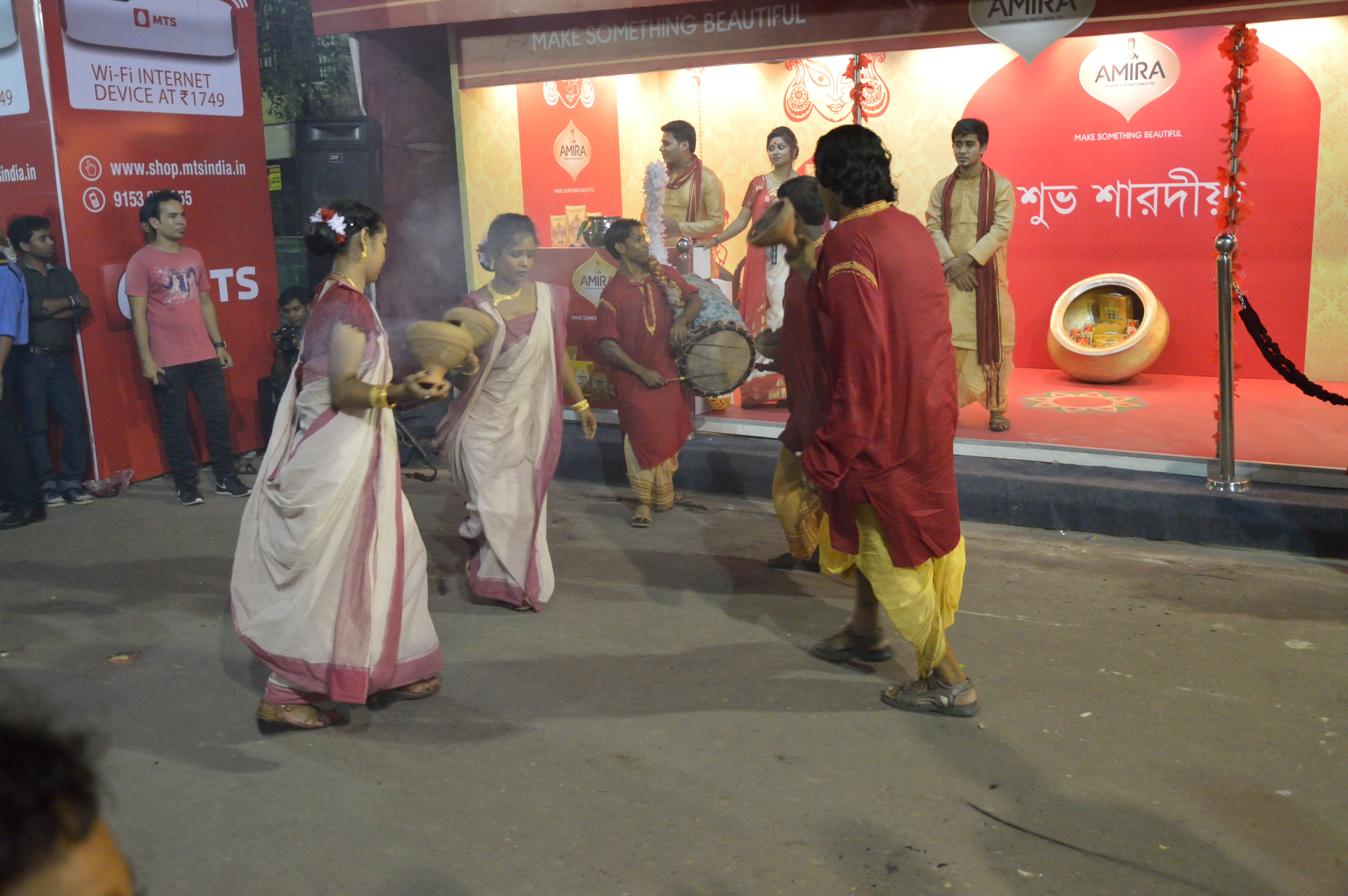
Two women dressed in garad sari are performing Dhunuchi dance at Lake View Road of Kolkata.

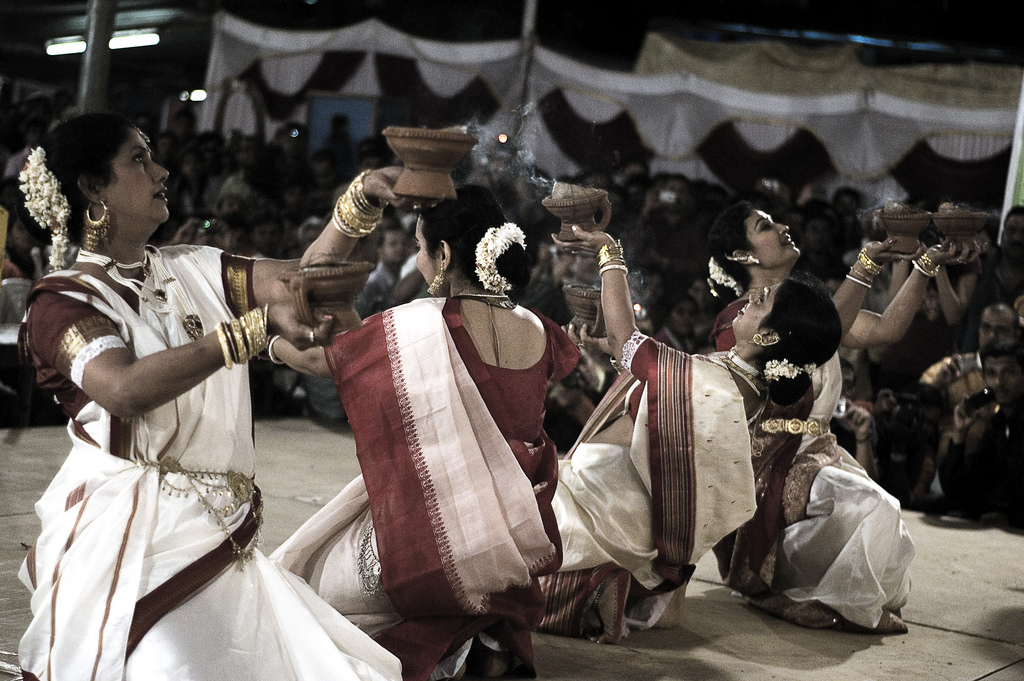
Aarti dance is performed by women dressed in garad sari in Bangalore.

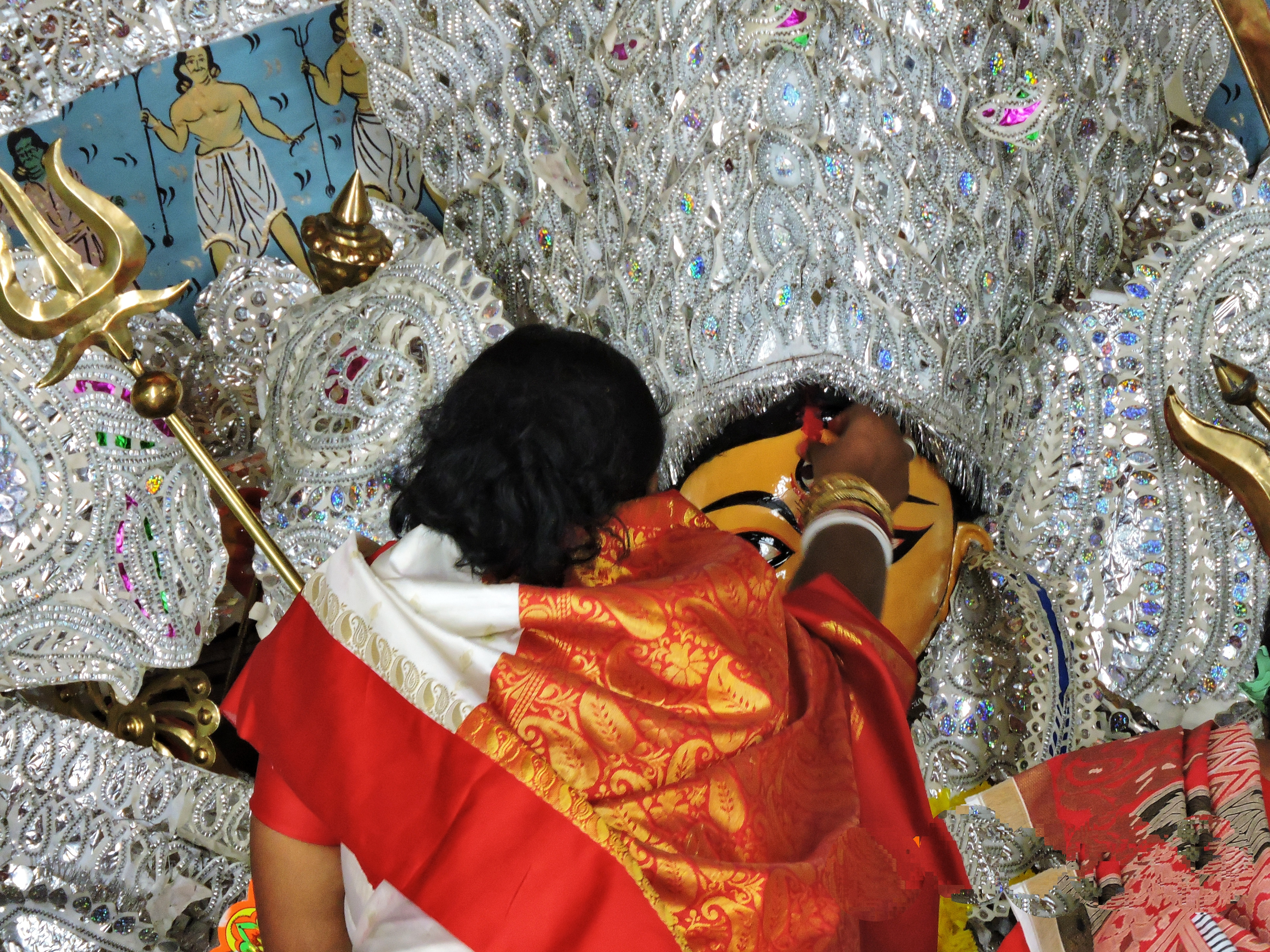
A woman dressed in garad sari devi baran (welcomes the goddess) on Bijoya Dashomi.
