= Baluchari sari =

Silk sari from Bengal

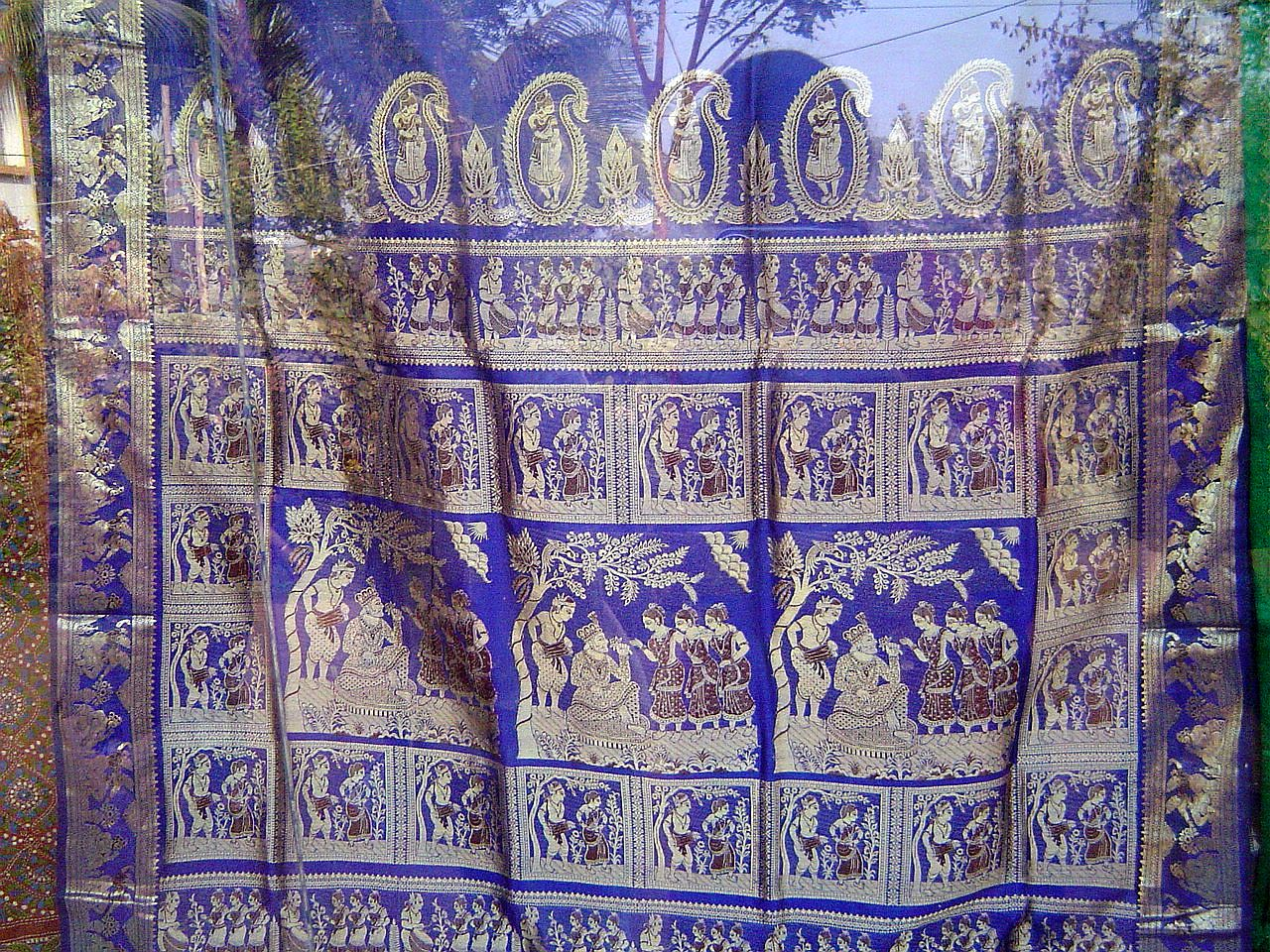

Production area
- Country: India
- State: West Bengal
- Location: Bishnupur

Details
- Invented: 18 century
- Origin place: Baluchar, Murshidabad, West Bengal
- Ingredients: Silk
- Length: 5–6.5 metres (16–21 ft)
- Breadth: 116–122 centimetres (3.81–4.00 ft)
- Style: Bengal tradition
- Usage: Festival

Status
- GI Status: Registered
- Application no.: 173

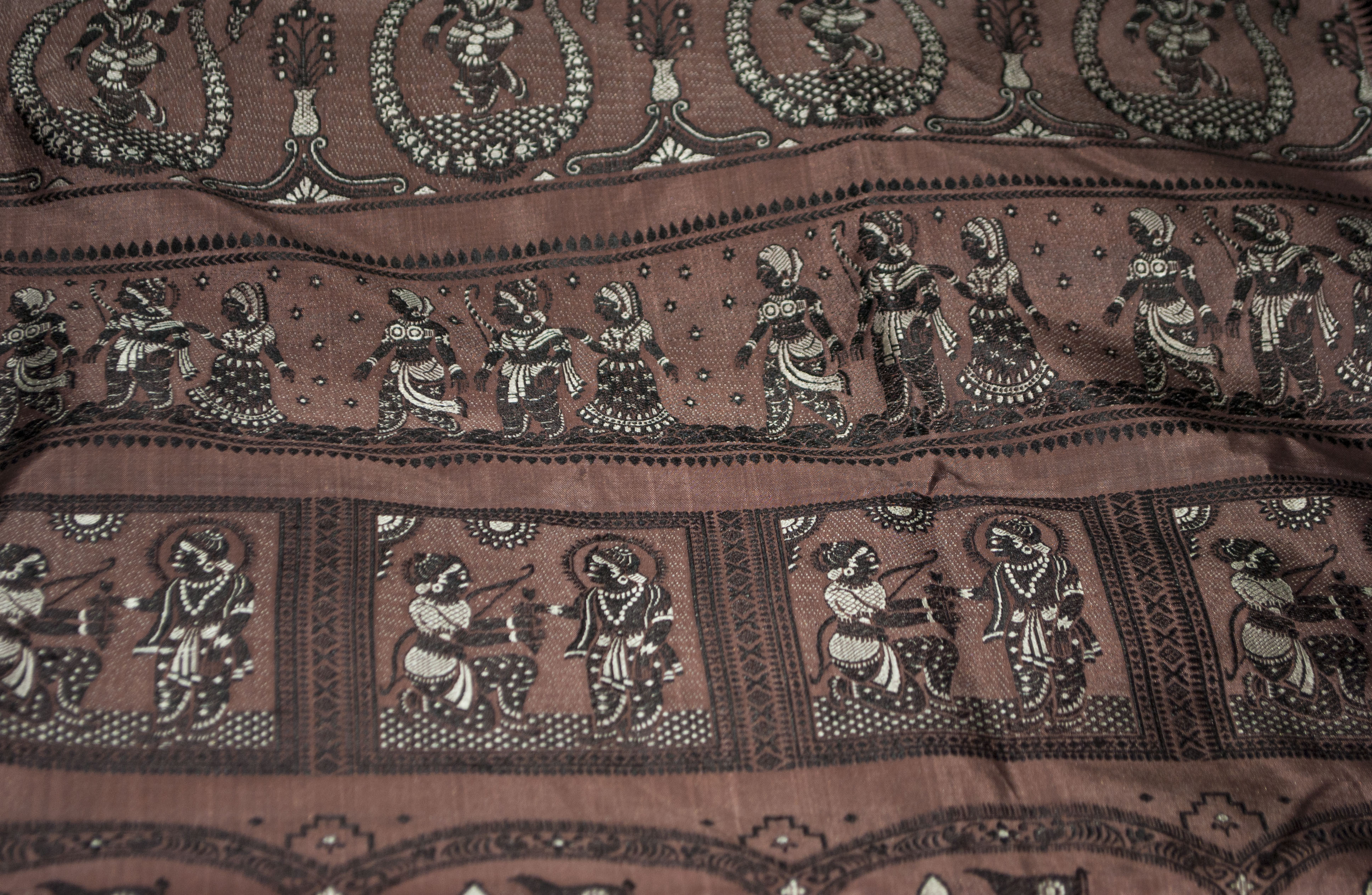
Baluchari Sari

Baluchari Sari (Bengali: বালুচরী শাড়ি) is a type of sari, a garment worn by women in the Indian states of West Bengal, Tripura and Assam and the country of Bangladesh. This particular type of sari originated in West Bengal and is known for depictions of mythological scenes on the anchal of the sari. It used to be produced in Murshidabad but presently Bishnupur and its surrounding areas of West Bengal are the only place where authentic Baluchari saris are produced. It takes approximately one week to produce one such sari. In 2011, the Baluchari Sari was granted the status of Geographical Indication for West Bengal in India.

== History ==
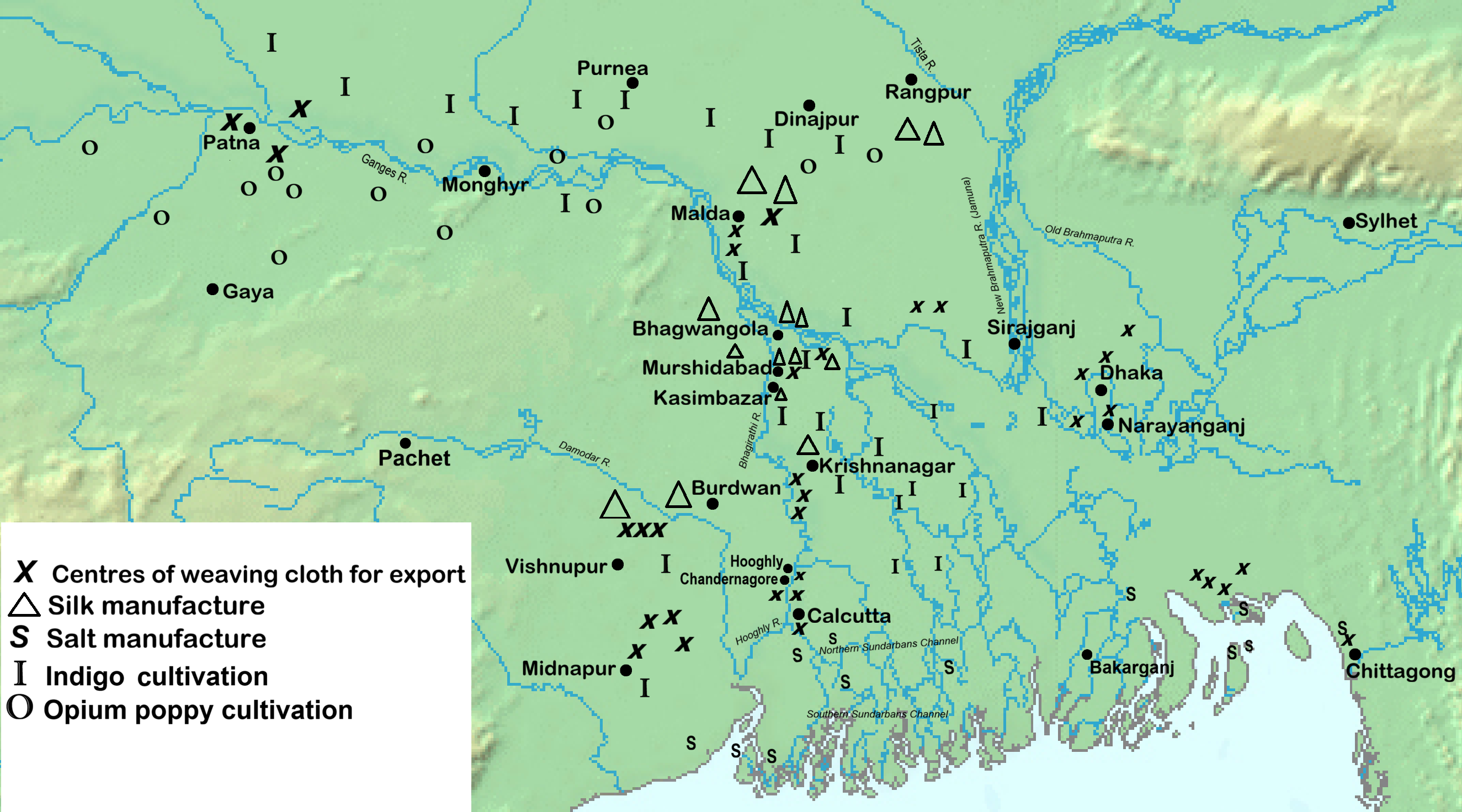
Centres of cloth weaving for export and of Bengal silk manufacture (1740–1828)

Baluchari Sari made of tassar silk and a thousand years old when the Jagat Malla king rule in Mallabhum. This flourishing trend later declined, especially during British rule, due to political and financial reasons. It became a dying craft as most of the weavers were compelled to give up the profession.

In the first half of twentieth century, Subho Thakur, a famous artist, felt the need to recultivate the rich tradition of Baluchari craft. Though Bishnupur was always famous for its silk, he invited Akshay Kumar Das, a master weaver of Bishnupur, to his center to learn the technique of jacquard weaving. Sri Das then went back to Bishnupur and worked hard to weave Baluchari on their looms with the financial and moral support of Sri Hanuman Das Sarda of Silk Khadi Seva Mandal.

According to Maniklal Sinha, Baluchari saree in the post independent year, government of India tried to recover. In obedience to the government of its then Sri Shyamadas babu this extinct Baluchari Tat-Veteran renowned artist 'Akshay Kumar Das (Potranga) and his subtle artwork discovered its weaving process by feeling. In this regard, he is completely helped by Nikhil Bharat Khadi and Village Development Commission certified by Bishupur.

Under the direction of Hanuman Das Sarada, local director of the Silk Khadi Seva Mandal, Akshay Kumar Das contributed to the revival of Baluchari sari weaving through technical and design innovations.

Once Bishnupur was the capital of Malla dynasty and different kinds of crafts flourished during their period under the patronage of Malla kings. Temples made of terracotta bricks were one achievement of these rulers. A major influence of these temples can be seen in Baluchari sarees. Mythological stories taken from the walls of temples and woven on Baluchari sarees is a common feature in Bishnupur.

== Production process ==
The production process of Baluchari can be divided into several parts:

Cultivation of cocoons: Since the discovery so many years ago that the fibre or filament composing the cocoon of the silkworm can be constructed into durable fabric, silkworms have been bred for the sole purpose of producing raw silk.

Processing of yarns: To make the yarn soft, it is boiled in a solution of soda and soap and then dyed in acid colour, according to the requirement of the sari. The yarn is stretched from both the sides in opposite directions putting some force with both palms. This process is needed to make the yarn crisper.

Motif making: Making of the motifs for 'pallavs' and other part of Baluchari is in itself an intricate process. The design is drawn on a graph paper, it is coloured and punching is done using cards. After punching, these cards are sewed in order and fixed in the jacquard machine.

Weaving: After the jacquard loom has been introduced, the weaving of a Baluchari sari takes five to six days. Two weavers work on a shifting basis.

Baluchari thus prepared becomes a sign of aristocracy, the attire of status. Maintenance of quality of Baluchari sari is taken care of precisely. The quality is checked from the stage of dying of the yarn to the packaging of the sari.

== Motifs: themes and variety ==
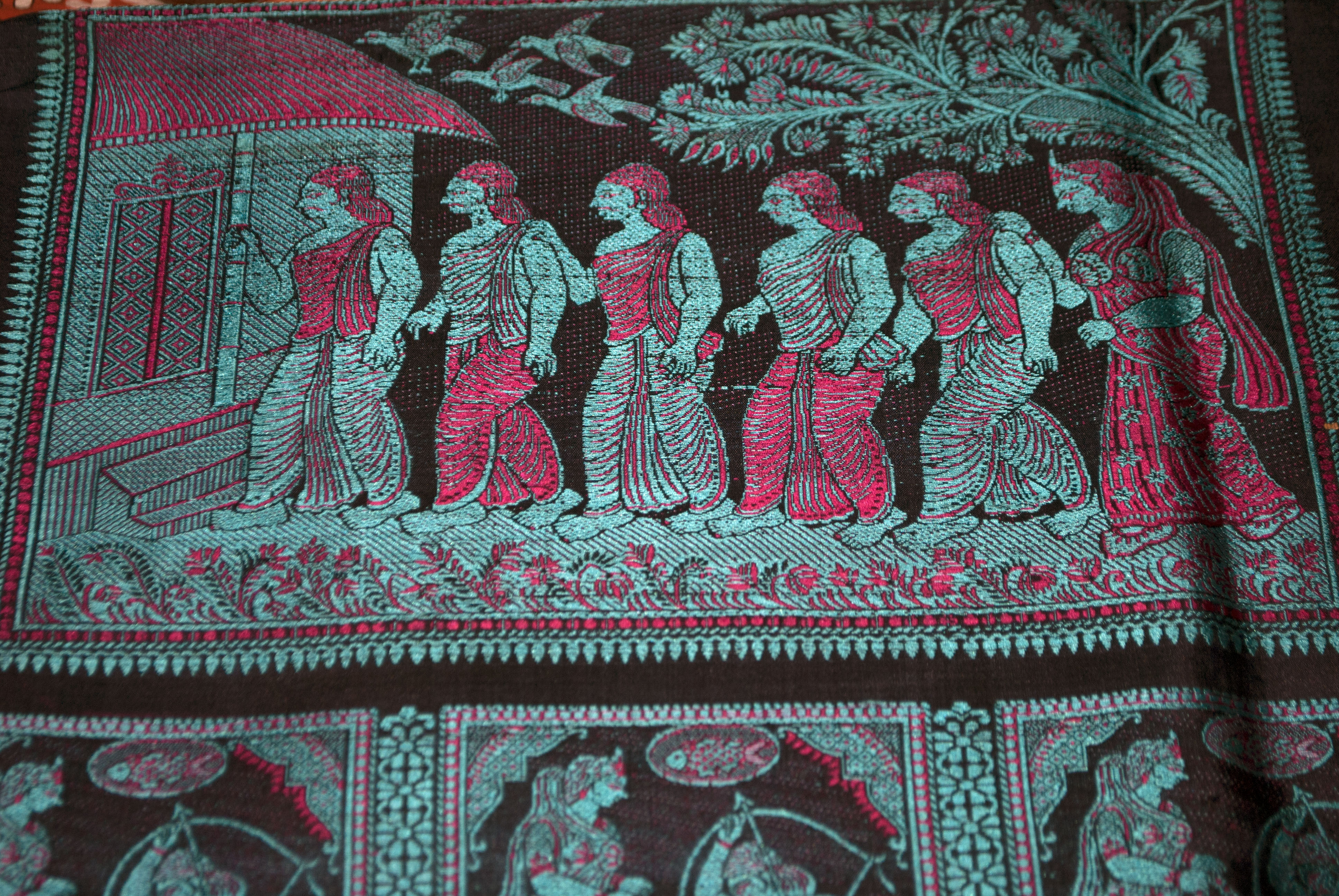
Baluchari saree - Mahabharat motif showing the Pandavas marrying Draupadi.

Baluchari saris, locally called Baluchori saris, today often have depictions from scenes of Mahabharat and Ramayana. During the Mughal and British eras, they had a square design in the pallu with paisley motifs in them. They depicted scenes from the lives of the Nawab of Bengal featuring women smoking hookahs, nawabs driving horse carriages, and even European officers of the East India Company. It would take two craftsmen working for almost a week to produce one sari. The main material used is silk and the sari is polished after weaving.

Baluchari saris illustrate Hindu mythological scenes, nature, folklore, legends, historical events, and abstract designs. They showcase gods, heroes, nature elements, love stories, battles, and contemporary patterns.

While there isn’t a lot of variation in the method of weaving used today, balucharis can be broadly categorized based on the threads used in weaving the patterns:

- Baluchari (resham): The simplest balucharis have resham threads in a single colour to weave the entire pattern
- Baluchari (meenakari): These balucharis have threads in two or more colours with attractive meenakari work that further brightens the patterns
- Swarnachari (baluchari in gold): They are the most gorgeous balucharis, woven with gold (Swarna) or silver-coloured threads (often with meenakari work in another colour), which is called Zari. That illuminates the patterns to a much larger extent.

== Organic Baluchari ==
With the changing times, the Baluchari sari has had a makeover and a touch of eco-friendliness in terms of the used yarns and colours. Cotton Kapas is spun with fibres of banana plants and bamboo shoots and the dyes are extracts of fruits, flowers, leaves, and vegetables such as pomegranate, jamun, neem fruits and leaves, basil leaves, turmeric, marigold flowers, mangoes and others.The organic baluchari cotton sarees were displayed in the sari fair organised by Rang Mahal, a forum of weavers from Nadia district in West Bengal. However, with the GI certification of Baluchari sarees with reference to Bankura district of West Bengal in India, it is now not permitted to use the term Baluchari for any other similar product based on cotton or any other material.

== Display and felicitation ==
The Baluchari sari was one of the award winners for the main weaving styles amongst 34 National Awards for the years 2009 and 2010 presented by the Hon. President Pranab Mukherjee.

The Baluchari sari of Bankura was showcased at the India International Trade Fair organised at New Delhi. The pavilion of West Bengal prominently displayed those products of handicrafts and handloom sector which were recognised for their unique nature keeping the theme "Skilling India" in view.
