= Sari =

Woman's draped garment of the Indian subcontinent

- Type: Dress
- Material: Cotton, Silk, Synthetic fiber
- Place of origin: Indian subcontinent

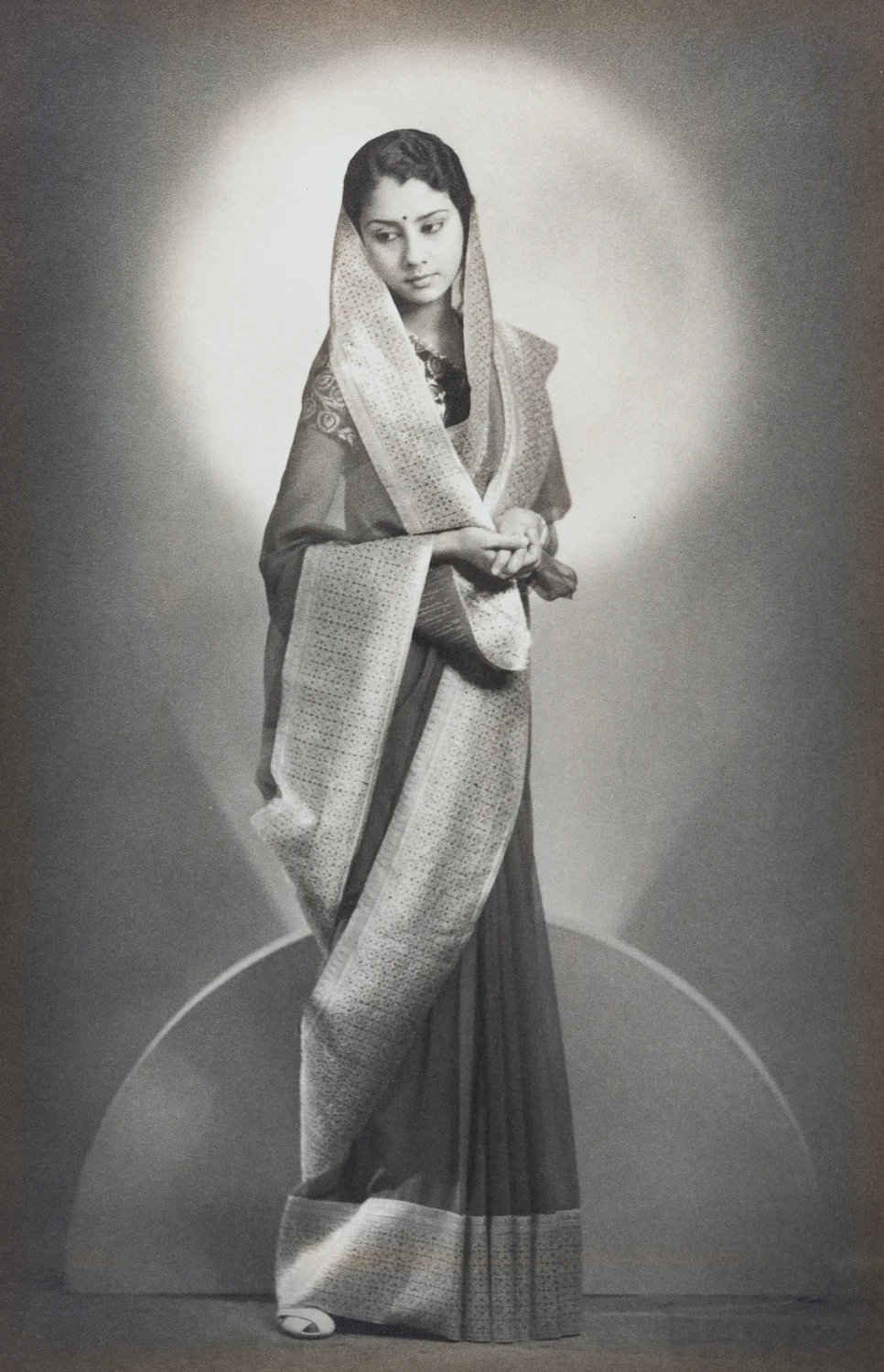
Maharani Vijaya Raje Scindia of Gwalior dressed in sari, c. 1940

A sari (Hindi: [saːɽiː]; sometimes also saree, sharee, or sadi) (Note: The name of the garment in various regional languages include: Assamese: শাৰী, romanised: xārī; Bengali: শাড়ি, romanised: śāṛi; Gujarati: સાડી, romanised: sāḍī; Hindi: साड़ी, romanised: sāṛī; Kannada: ಸೀರೆ, romanised: sīre; Konkani: साडी, कापड, चीरे, romanised: sāḍī, kāpaḍ, cīrē; Malayalam: സാരി, romanised: sāri; Marathi: साडी, romanised: sāḍī; Nepali: सारी, romanised: sārī; Odia: ଶାଢ଼ୀ, romanised: śāṛhī; Punjabi: ਸਾਰੀ, romanised: sārī; Tamil: புடவை, romanised: puṭavai; Telugu: చీర, romanised: cīra; Urdu: ساڑى, romanised: sāṛī) is a draped cloth and women's garment in the Indian subcontinent. It consists of an un-stitched stretch of woven fabric arranged over the body as a dress, with one end attached to the waist, while the other end rests over one shoulder as a stole, sometimes baring a part of the midriff. It may vary from 4.5 to 9 yards (4.1 to 8.2 metres) in length, and 24 to 47 inches (60 to 120 centimetres) in breadth, and is a form of traditional clothing.

There are various names and styles of sari manufacture and draping, the most common being the Nivi style. The sari is worn with a fitted bodice also called a choli (ravike or kuppasa in southern India, choli in northern India, and cholo in Nepal) and a petticoat called ghagra, parkar, or ul-pavadai.

It remains fashionable in the Indian subcontinent and is also considered formal attire in the countries of the region.

== Etymology ==
The Hindi word sāṛī (साड़ी), described in Sanskrit śāṭī which means 'strip of cloth' and शाडी śāḍī or साडी sāḍī in Prakrit, ಸೀರೆ or sīre in Kannada, and which evolved to sāṛī in modern Indian languages. The word śāṭika is mentioned as describing women's dharmic attire in Sanskrit literature and Buddhist literature called the Jatakas. This could be equivalent to the modern day sari. The term for the female bodice, the choli, evolved from the ancient stanapaṭṭa. Rajatarangini, a tenth-century literary work by Kalhana, states that the choli from the Deccan was introduced under the royal order in Kashmir.

The petticoat is called sāyā (साया) in Hindi, parkar (परकर) in Marathi, ul pavadai (உள் பாவாடை, "inner womens' clothing") in Tamil (pavada in other parts of South India: Malayalam: പാവാട, romanised: pāvāḍa, Telugu: పావడ, romanised: pāvaḍa, Kannada: ಪಾವುಡೆ, romanised: pāvuḍe), sāẏā (সায়া) in Bengali and eastern India, and sāya (සාය) in Sinhalese. Apart from the standard "petticoat", it may also be called an "inner skirt" or an inskirt.

== Origins and history ==
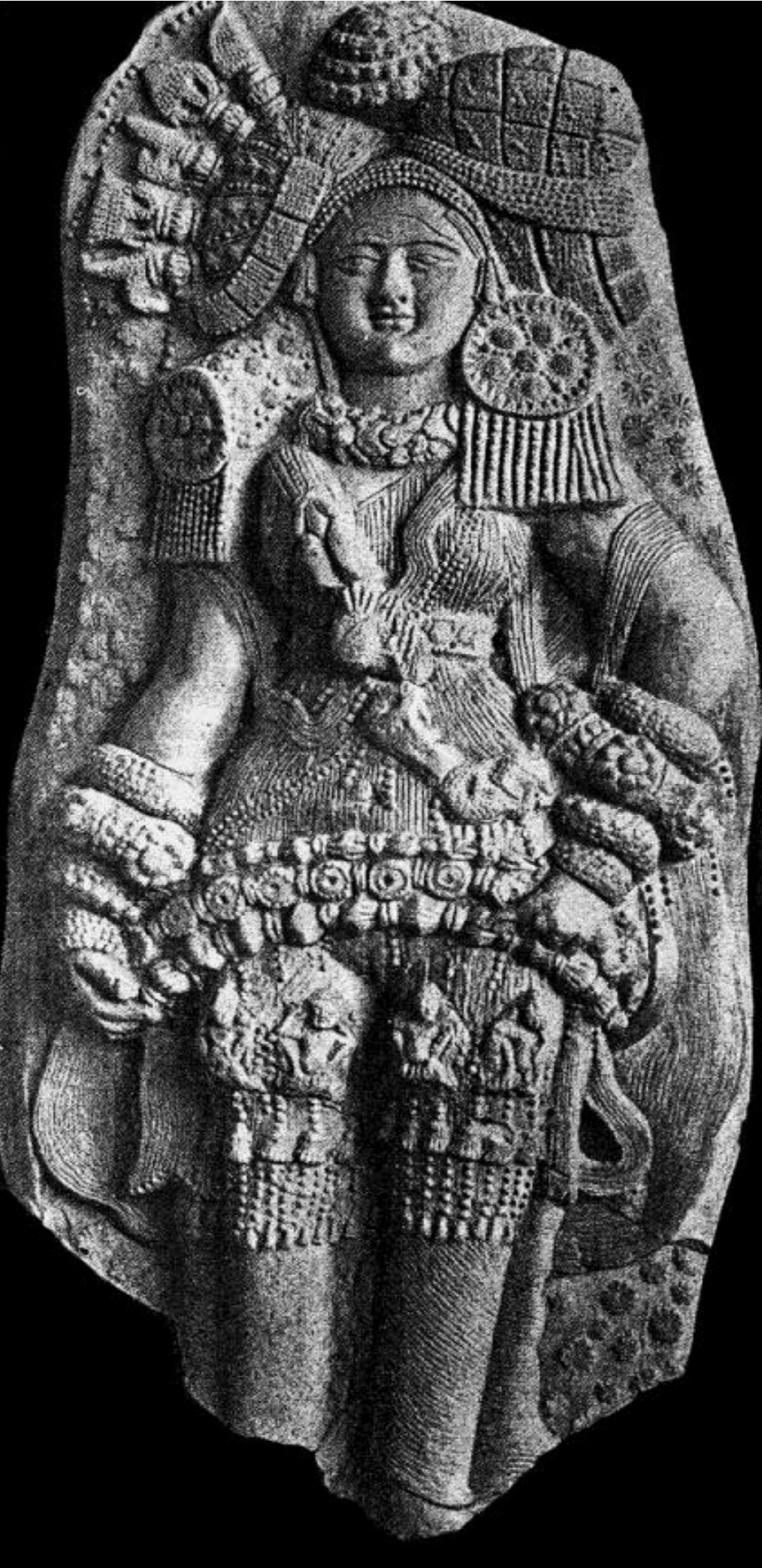
2nd century BCE terracotta figurine in a sari-like drape, Bengal.

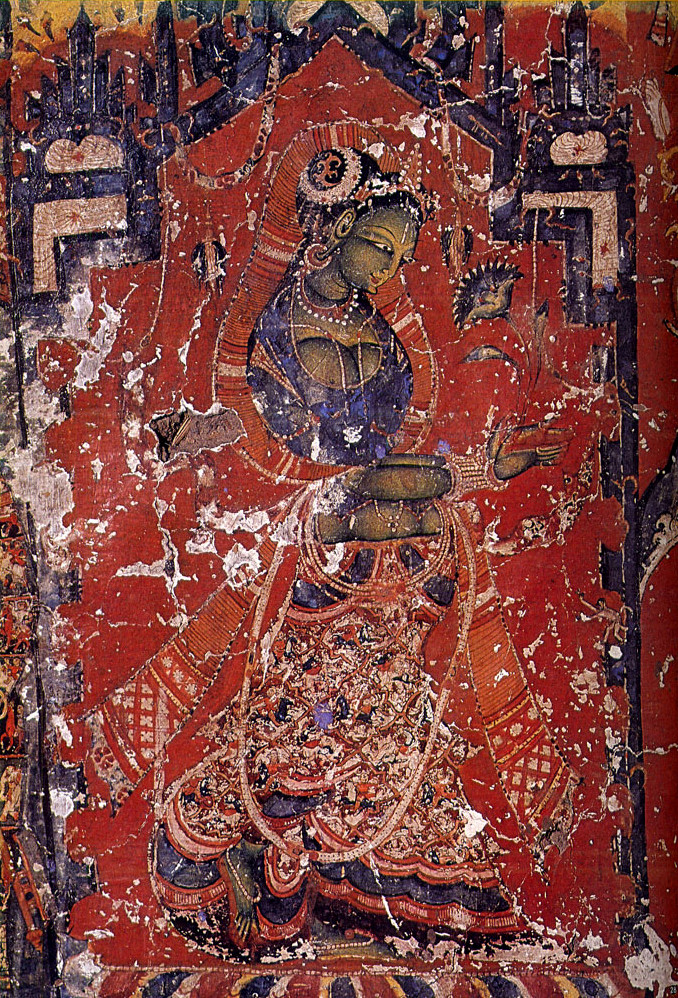
Tara depicted in ancient three-piece attire, c. 11th century CE.

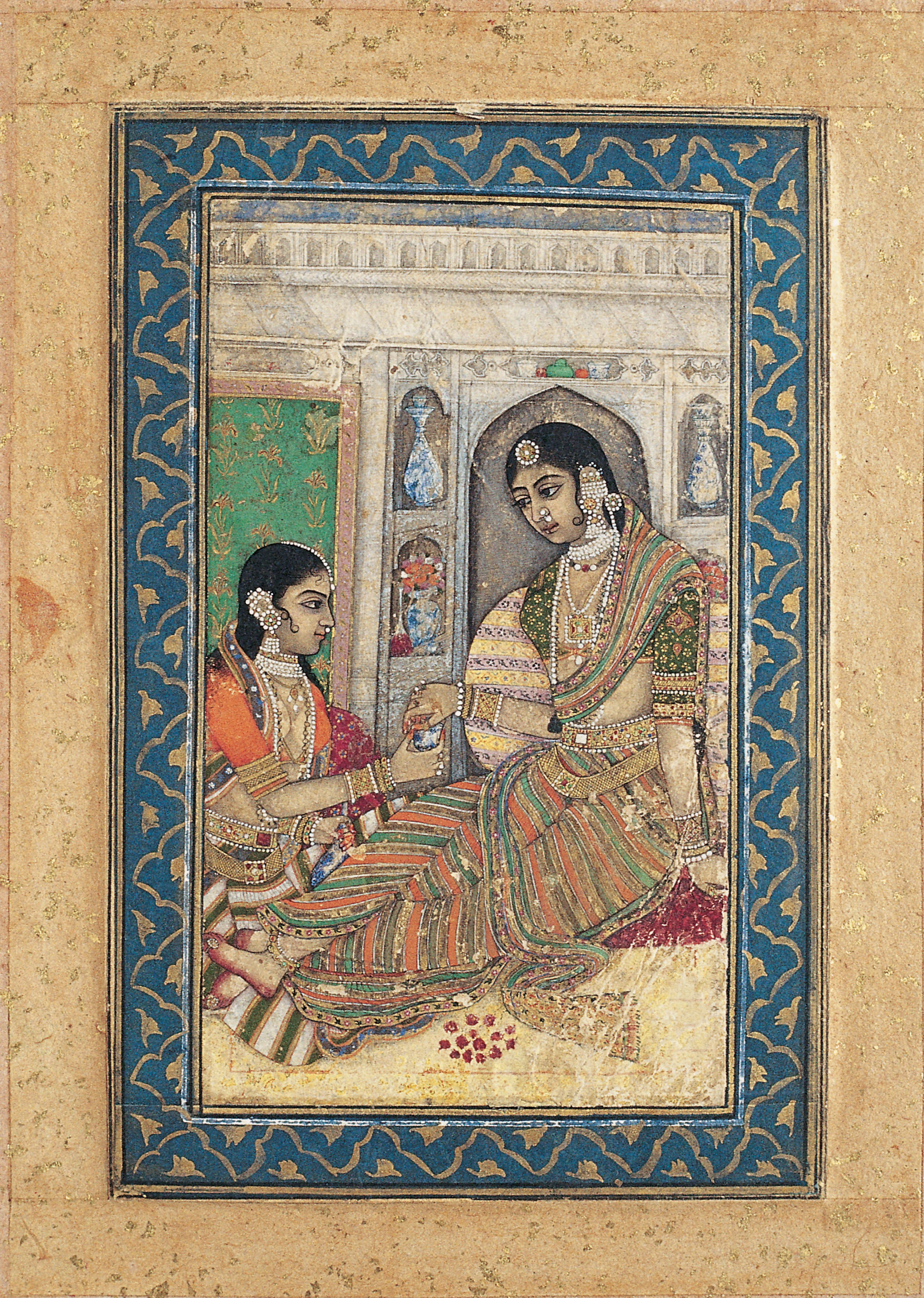
Lady enjoying her drink, Deccan, c. 1630 CE. Chhatrapati Shivaji Maharaj Vastu Sangrahalaya

The history of sari-like drapery can be traced back to ancient India, between 2800 and 1800 BCE, around the northwestern region of the Indian subcontinent. Cotton was first cultivated and woven on the Indian subcontinent around the 5th millennium BCE. Dyes used during this period are still in use, particularly indigo, lac, red madder, and turmeric. Silk was woven around 2450 BCE and 2000 BCE.

The word sari is derived from śāṭikā (Sanskrit: शाटिका), which is mentioned in early Hindu literature as women's attire. The sari, or śāṭikā, evolved from a three-piece ensemble comprising the antarīya, the lower garment; the uttarīya, a veil worn over the shoulder or head; and the stanapatta, a chestband. This ensemble is mentioned in Sanskrit literature, Jain and Buddhist Prakrit literature during the 6th century BCE.

The ancient antariya closely resembled the dhoti wrap in the "fishtail" version, which was passed through the legs, covered the legs loosely, and then flowed into long, decorative pleats at the front of the legs. It further evolved into the Bhairnivasani skirt, today known as the ghagri and lehenga. Uttariya was a shawl-like veil worn over the shoulder or head. It evolved into what is known today as the dupatta and ghoonghat. Likewise, the stanapaṭṭa evolved into the choli by the 1st century CE.

The 7th century Sanskrit work Kadambari by Banabhatta and ancient Tamil poetry, such as the Cilappatikaram, describe women in exquisite drapery or saris. In ancient India, although women wore saris that bared the navel, the Dharmasastra writers stated that women should be dressed such that the navel would never become visible, which may have led to a taboo on exposure of the midriff at some times and places.

It is generally accepted that wrapped sari-like garments for the lower body and sometimes shawls or scarf like garments called 'uttariya' for the upper body, have been worn by Indian women for a long time, and that they have been worn in their current form for hundreds of years. In ancient couture, the lower garment was called 'nivi' or 'nivi bandha', while the upper body was mostly left bare. The works of Kalidasa mention the kūrpāsaka, a form of tight fitting breast band that simply covered the breasts. It was also sometimes referred to as an uttarāsaṅga or stanapaṭṭa.

Poetic references from works like Cilappatikaram indicate that during the Sangam period in ancient Tamil Nadu in southern India, a single piece of clothing served as both a lower garment and head covering, leaving the midriff completely uncovered. Similar styles of the sari are recorded in paintings by Raja Ravi Varma in Kerala. Numerous sources say that everyday costume in ancient India until recent times in Kerala consisted of a pleated dhoti or (sarong) wrap, combined with a breast band called kūrpāsaka or stanapaṭṭa and occasionally a wrap called uttarīya that could at times be used to cover the upper body or head. The two-piece Kerala mundum neryathum (mundu, a dhoti or sarong, and neryath, a shawl, in Malayalam) is a survival of ancient clothing styles. The one-piece sari in Kerala is derived from neighbouring Tamil Nadu or Deccan during the medieval period based on its appearance on various temple murals in medieval Kerala.

Early Sanskrit literature has a wide vocabulary of terms for the veiling used by women, such as Avagunthana (oguntheti/oguṇthikā), meaning cloak-veil; Uttariya, meaning shoulder-veil; Mukha-pata, meaning face-veil; and Sirovas-tra, meaning head-veil.

In the Pratimānātaka, a play by Bhāsa, the avagunthana veil is described as follows: "ladies may be seen without any blame (for the parties concerned) in a religious session, in marriage festivities, during a calamity and in a forest". The same sentiment is more generically expressed in later Sanskrit literature. Śūdraka, the author of Mṛcchakatika, set in the fifth century BCE, says that the Avagaunthaha was not used by women every day and at every time. He says that a married lady was expected to put on a veil while moving in public. This may indicate that it was not necessary for unmarried females to put on a veil. This form of veiling by married women is still prevalent in Hindi-speaking areas, and is known as ghoonghat where the loose end of a sari is pulled over the head to act as a facial veil.

Based on sculptures and paintings, tight bodices, or cholis, are believed to have evolved between the 2nd century BCE and 6th century CE in various regional styles. Early cholis were front coverings tied at the back; this style was more common in parts of ancient northern India. This ancient form of bodice, or choli, is still common in the state of Rajasthan today. Various styles of decorative traditional embroidery like gota patti, mochi, pakko, kharak, suf, kathi, phulkari and gamthi are done on cholis. In southern parts of India, choli is known as ravikie, which is tied at the front instead of the back, kasuti is a traditional form of embroidery used for cholis in this region. In Nepal, choli is known as cholo or chaubandi cholo and is traditionally tied at the front.

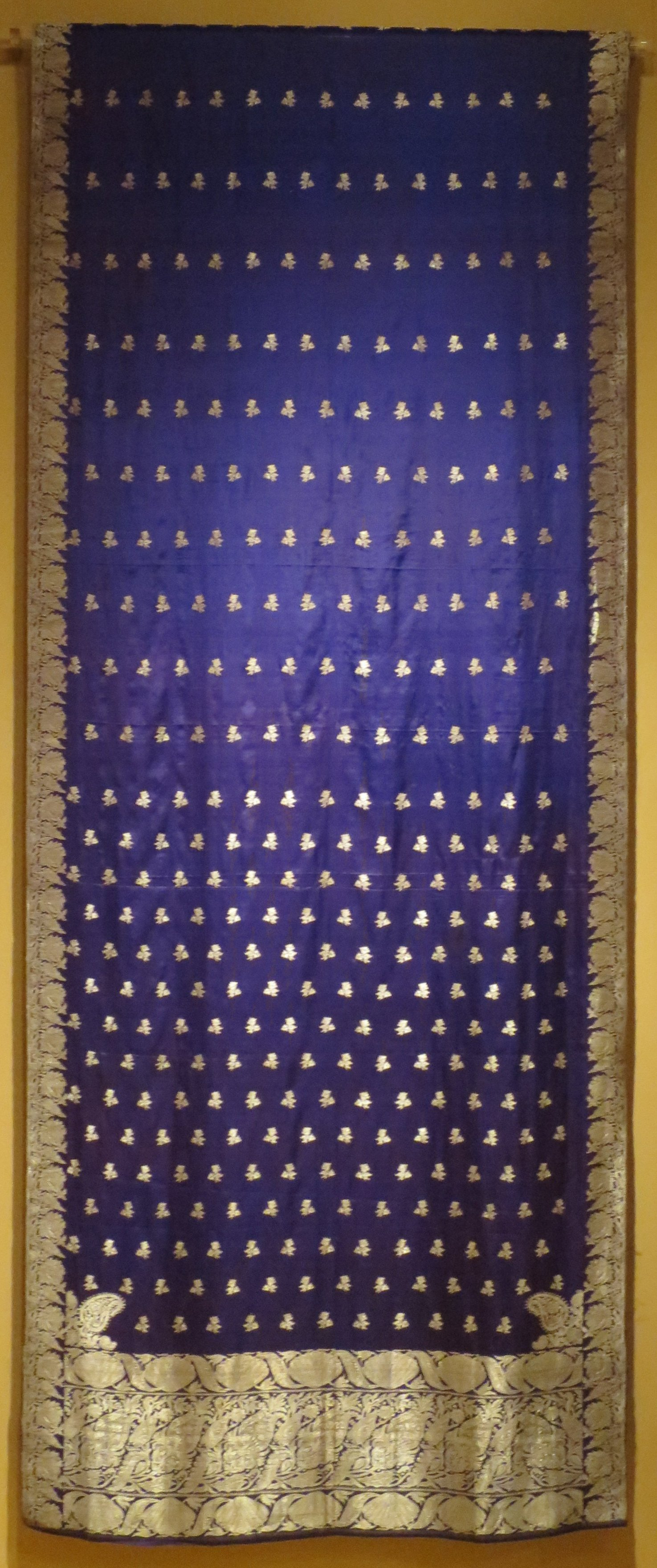
20th century Handloom silk sari from Uttar Pradesh. Honolulu Museum of Art.

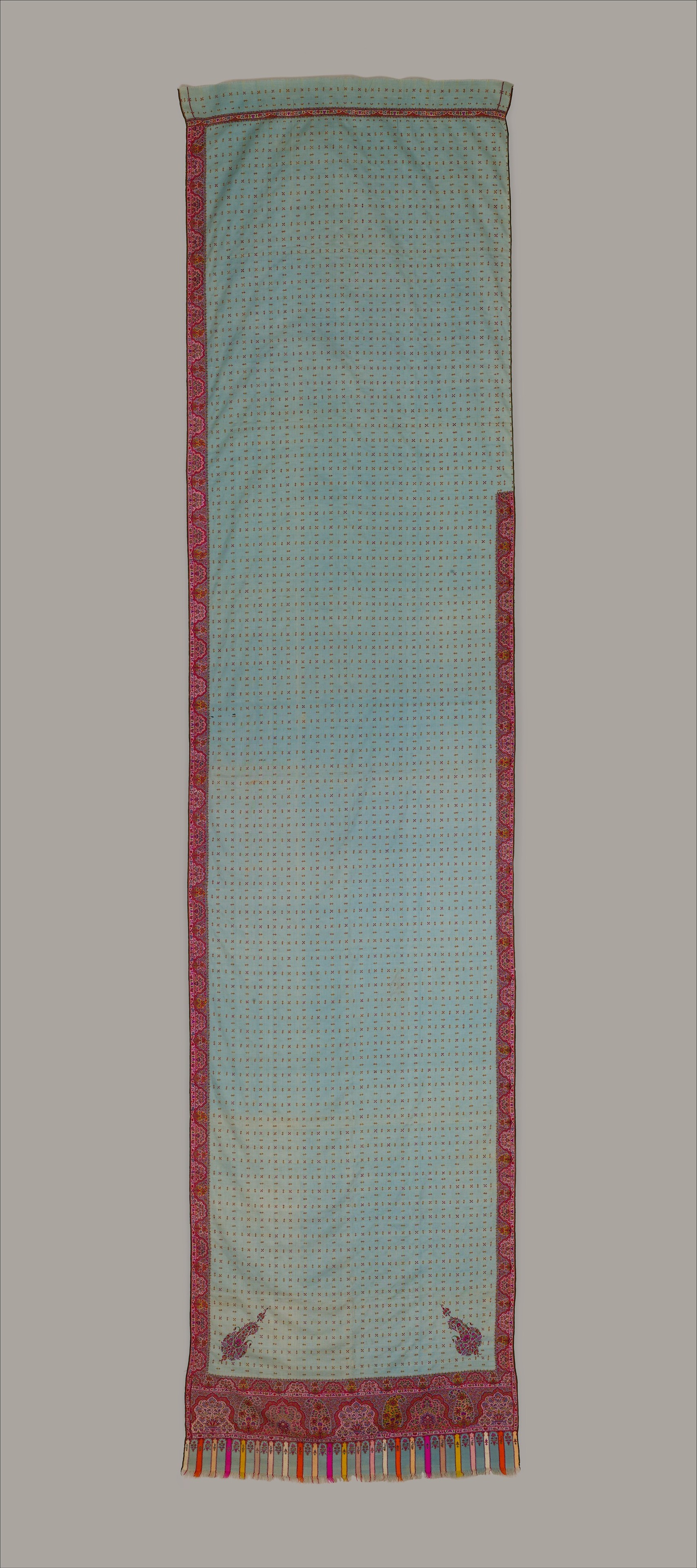
Early 19th century woollen sari from Kashmir. Metropolitan Museum of Art.

Red is the most favoured colour for wedding saris, which are the traditional garment choice for brides in Hindu weddings. Women traditionally wore various types of regional handloom saris made of silk, cotton, ikkat, block-print, Ilkal sari, embroidery, and tie-dye textiles. The most sought after brocade silk saris are Banarasi, Kanchipuram (sometimes also Kanchipuram or Kanjivaram), Gadwal, Paithani, Mysore, Uppada, Bagalpuri, Balchuri, Maheshwari, Chanderi, Mekhela, Ghicha, Narayan pet and Eri etc. are traditionally worn for festive and formal occasions.

Silk Ikat and cotton saris known as Patola, Pochampally, Bomkai, Khandua, Sambalpuri, Gadwal, Berhampuri, Bargarh, Jamdani, Tant, Mangalagiri, Guntur, Narayan pet, Chanderi, Maheshwari, Nuapatn, Tussar, Ilkal, Kotpad and Manipuri were worn for both festive and everyday attire. Tie-dyed and block-print saris known as Bandhani, Leheria/Leheriya, Bagru, Ajrakh, Sungudi, Kota Dabu/Dabu print, Bagh and Kalamkari were traditionally worn during monsoon season.

Gota Patti is a popular form of traditional embroidery used on saris for formal occasions; various other types of traditional folk embroidery, such as mochi, pakko, kharak, suf, kathi, phulkari, and gamthi, are also commonly used for both informal and formal occasions. Today, modern fabrics like polyester, georgette, and charmeuse are also commonly used.

== Styles of draping ==
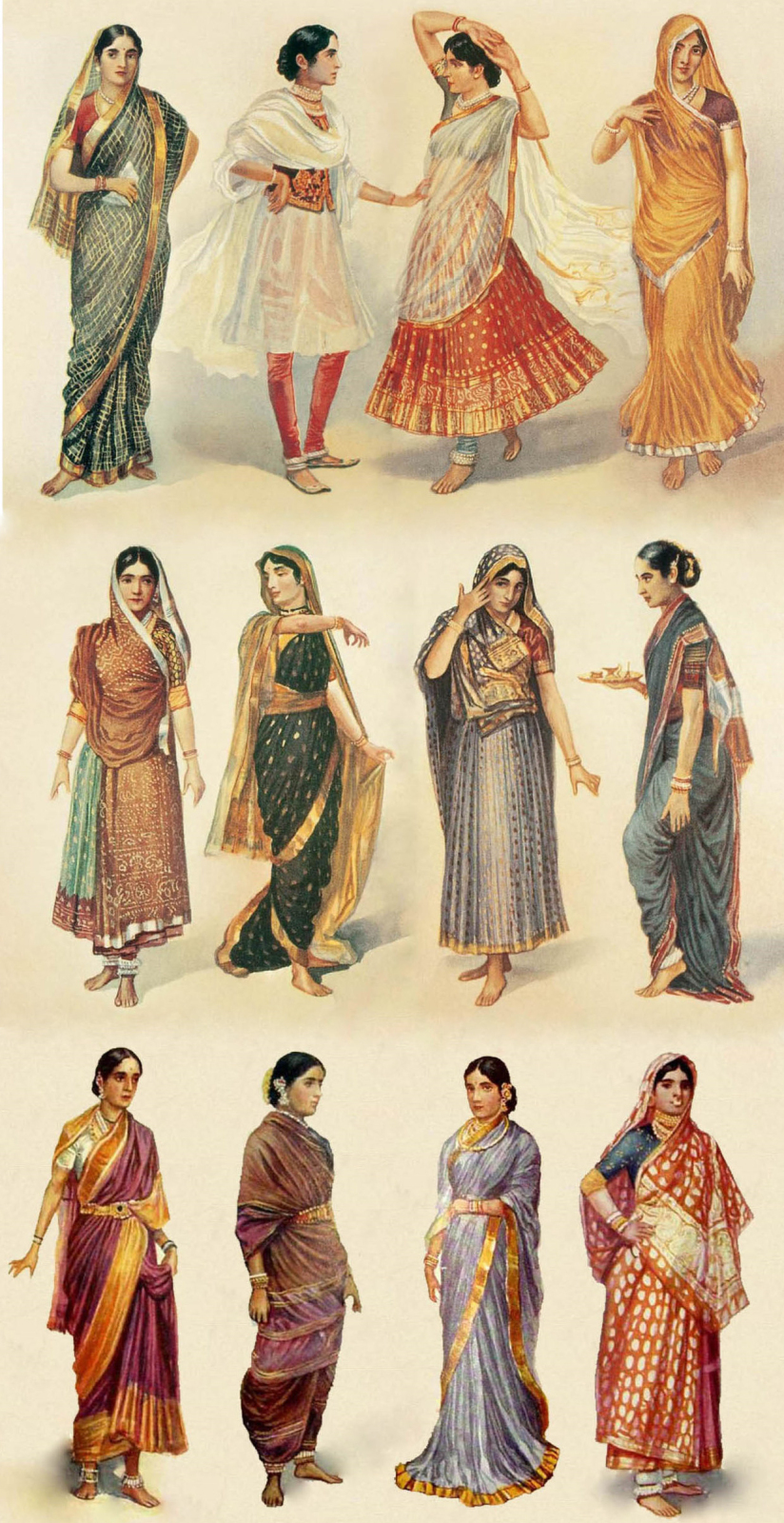
1928 illustration of different styles of sari, gagra choli and shalwar kameez worn by women of South Asia

There are more than 80 recorded ways to wear a sari. The most common style is for the sari to be wrapped around the waist, with the loose end of the drape to be worn over the shoulder, exposing the navel. However, the sari can be draped in several different styles, though some styles do require a sari of a particular length or form. Ṛta Kapur Chishti, a sari historian and recognised textile scholar, has documented 108 ways of wearing a sari in her book, 'Saris: Tradition and Beyond'. The book documents the sari drapes across fourteen states: Gujarat, Maharashtra, Goa, Karnataka, Kerala, Tamil Nadu, Andhra Pradesh, Odisha, West Bengal, Jharkhand, Bihar, Chhattisgarh, Madhya Pradesh, Telangana, and Uttar Pradesh. The Sari Series, a non-profit project created in 2017, is a digital anthology documenting India's regional sari drapes, providing over 80 short films on how to drape the various styles.

The French cultural anthropologist and sari researcher Chantal Boulanger categorised sari drapes into the following families:

- Nivi sari – style originally worn in the Deccan region; besides the modern nivi, there is also the Nauvari, kaccha, or kasta nivi, where the pleats are passed through the legs and tucked in at the back. This allows free movement while covering the legs.
- Bihar, Uttar Pradesh, Gujarati, Rajasthani – It is worn similar to the nivi style but with the loose end of sari, aanchal or pallu, placed in the front; therefore, this style is known as sidha anchal or sidha pallu or sojha paala. After tucking in the pleats similar to the nivi style, the loose end is taken from the back, draped across the right shoulder, and pulled across to be secured in the back. This style is also worn by Punjabi Hindus and Sindhi Hindus.
- Bengali and Odia style is worn with a single box-pleat. Traditionally the Bengali style is worn with a single box pleat where the sari is wrapped around in an anti-clockwise direction around the waist and then a second time from the other direction. The loose end is a lot longer, and that goes around the body over the left shoulder. There is enough cloth left to cover the head as well. The Brahmika sari was introduced to Bengal by Jnanadanandini Devi after her tour in Bombay in 1870. Jnanadanandini improvised upon the sari style worn by Parsi and Gujarati women, which came to be known as Brahmika style.
- Himalayan – Kulluvi Pattu is traditional form of woollen sari worn in Himachal Pradesh, similar variation is also worn in Uttarakhand.
- Nepali: Nepal has different varieties of draping sari, today the most common is the Nivi drape. The traditional Newari sari drape is, folding the sari till it is below knee length and then wearing it like a nivi sari but the pallu is not worn across the chest and instead is tied around the waist and leaving it so it drops from waist to the knee, instead the pallu or a shawl is tied across the chest, by wrapping it from the right hip and back and is thrown over the shoulders. Saris are worn with blouse that are thicker and are tied several times across the front. The Bhojpuri, Maithil and Awadhi speaking community wears the sari sojha palla like the Gujarati drape. The women of the Rajbanshi communities traditionally wear their sari with no choli and tied below the neck like a towel but today only old women wear it in that style and the nivi and the Bengali drapes are more popular today. The Nivi drape was popularised in Nepal by the Shah royals and the Ranas.
- Nauvari and Kasta: this drape is worn similar to ancient form of navi sari worn in "Kacche" style where pleats in the front are tucked in the back, though there are many regional and societal variations. The style worn by Brahmin women differs from that of the Marathas. The style also differs from community to community. This style is popular in Maharashtra and Goa.
- Madisar – this drape is typical of Iyengar/Iyer Brahmin ladies from Tamil Nadu. Traditional Madisar is worn using 9 yards sari.
- The Parsi 'gara' is worn by Zoroastrian women in Gujarat in India and Sindh in Pakistan, it is worn similar to sidha pallu, it unique compared to traditional sari due to its Chinese style embroidery.
- Pin Kosuvam – this is the traditional Tamil Nadu style
- Kodava style – this drape is confined to ladies hailing from the Kodagu district of Karnataka. In this style, the pleats are created in the rear, instead of the front. The loose end of the sari is draped back-to-front over the right shoulder, and is pinned to the rest of the sari.
- Gobbe Seere – This style is worn by women in the Malnad or Sahyadri and central region of Karnataka. It is worn with 18 molas sari with three-four rounds at the waist and a knot after crisscrossing over shoulders.
- Karnataka – In Karnataka, apart from traditional Nivi sari, sari is also worn in "Karnataka Kacche" drape, kacche drape which shows nivi drape in front and kacche in back, there are Four kacche styles known in Karnataka – "Hora kacche", "Melgacche" ,"Vala kacche" or "Olagacche" and " Hale Kacche".
- Kerala sari style – the two-piece sari, or Mundum Neryathum, worn in Kerala. Usually made of unbleached cotton and decorated with gold or coloured stripes and/or borders.
- Kunbi style or denthli: Goan Kunbis and Gauda, and those of them who have migrated to other states use this way of draping sari or kappad, this form of draping is created by tying a knot in the fabric below the shoulder and a strip of cloth which crossed the left shoulder was fasten on the back.
- Riha-Mekhela, Kokalmora, Chador/Murot Mora Gamusa – This style worn in Assam is a wrap around style cloth similar to other Southeast Asian garments. it is originally a four-set of separate garments known Riha-Mekhela, Kokalmora, Chador or Murot Mora Gamusa. The bottom portion, draped from the waist downwards is called Mekhela. The Riha or Methoni is wrapped and often secured by tying them firmly across the chest, covering the breasts originally but now it is sometimes replaced by blouse from mainland India. The Kokalmora was used originally to tie the Mekhela around the waist and keep it firm.
- Innaphi and Phanek – This style of clothing worn in Manipur is also worn with three-set garment known as Innaphi Viel, Phanek lower wrap and long sleeved choli. It is somewhat similar to the style of clothing worn in Assam.
- Jainsem – It is a Khasi style of clothing worn in Khasi which is made up of several pieces of cloth, giving the body a cylindrical shape.

=== Historic photographs and regional styles ===
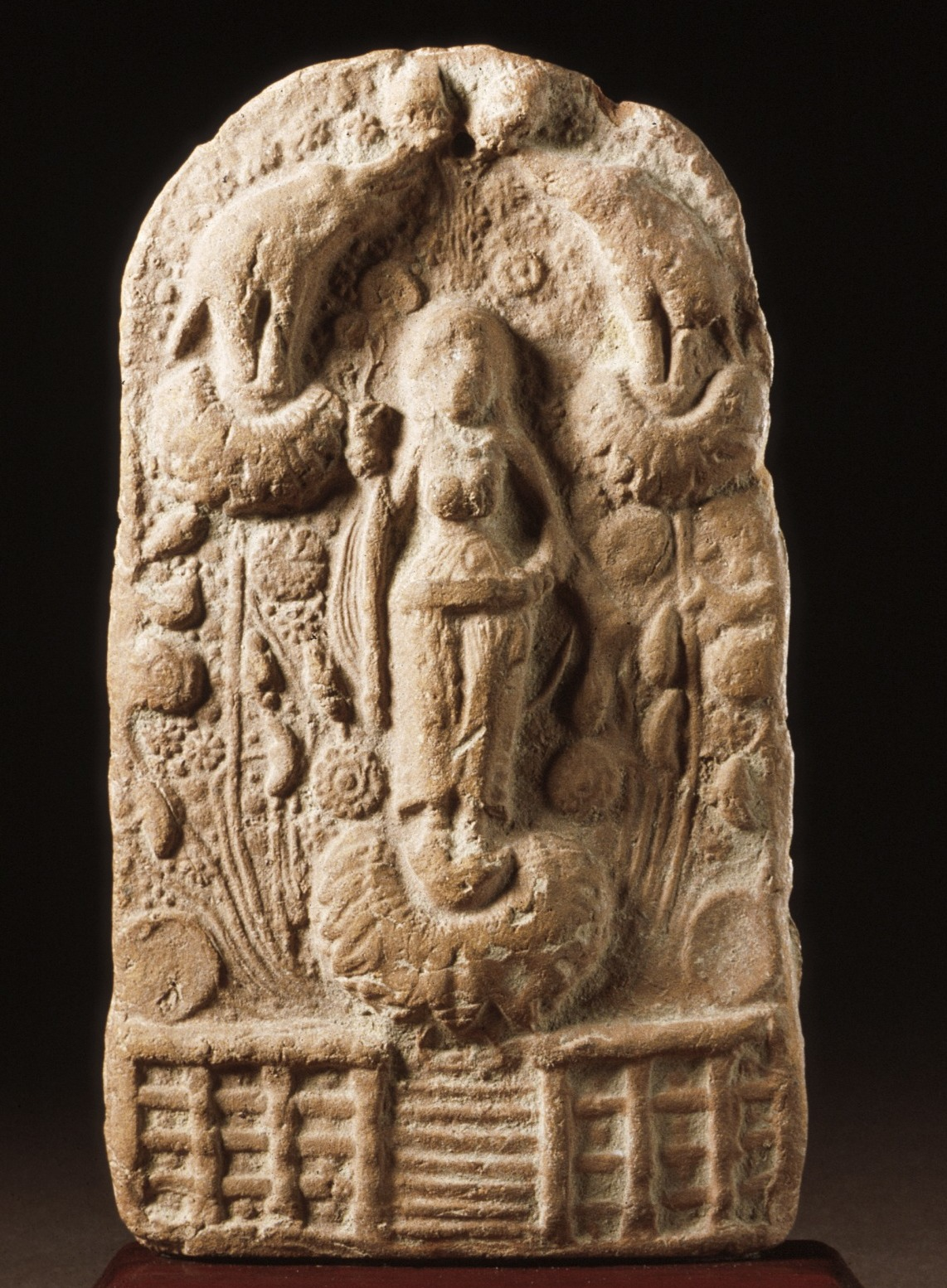
Plaque of goddess Lakshmi dressed in ancient sari, 1st century BCE

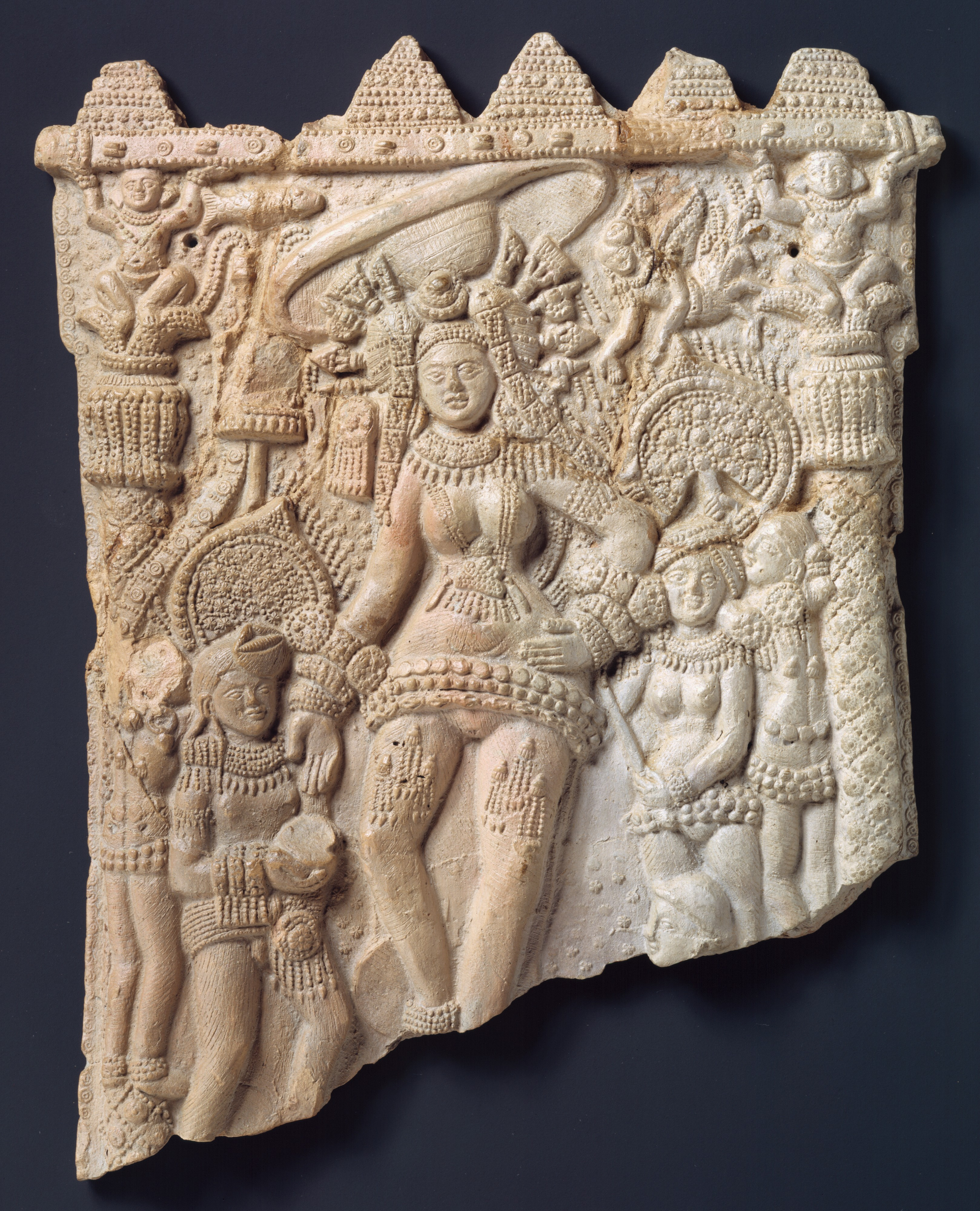
Plaque with female figure dressed in ancient variation of sari, 1st century BCE

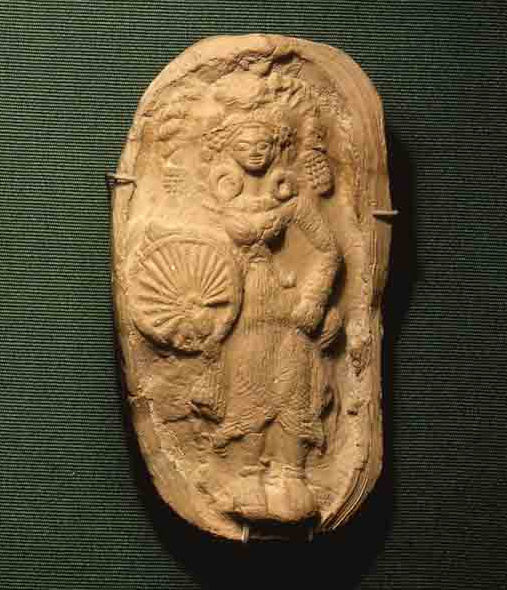
Female figure dressed in ancient form of sari, 200 BCE

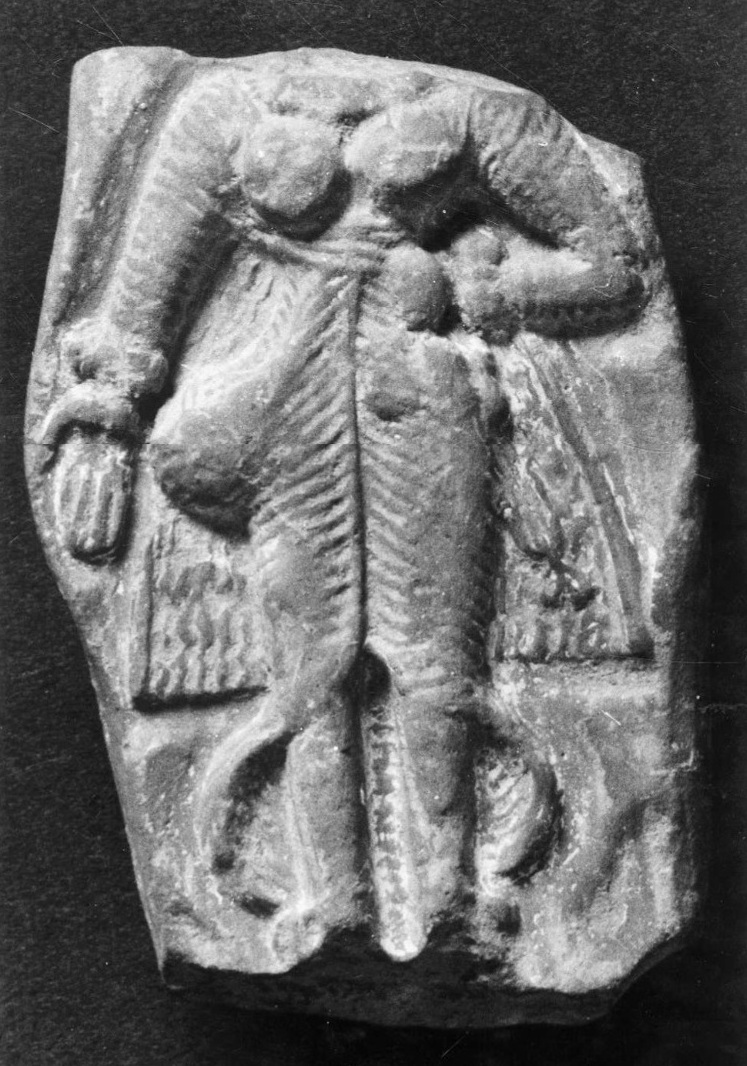
Female figure dressed in early form of sari, 1st century BCE

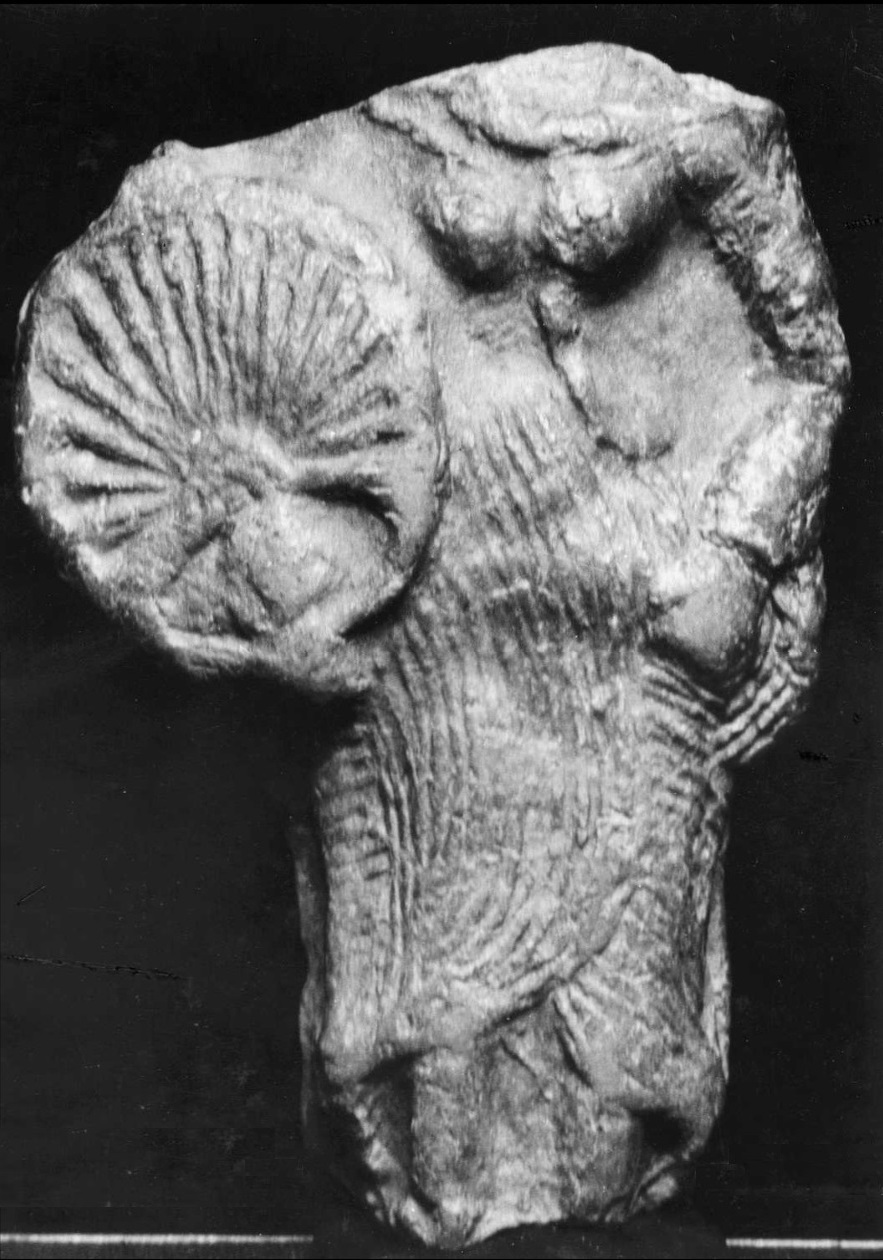
Female figure dressed in early form of sari, 1st century BCE

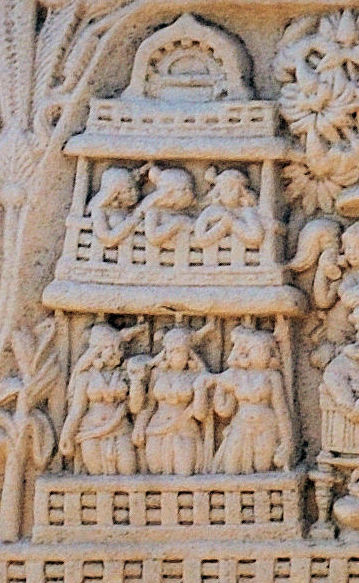
Women dressed in ancient form of sari, 1st century BCE

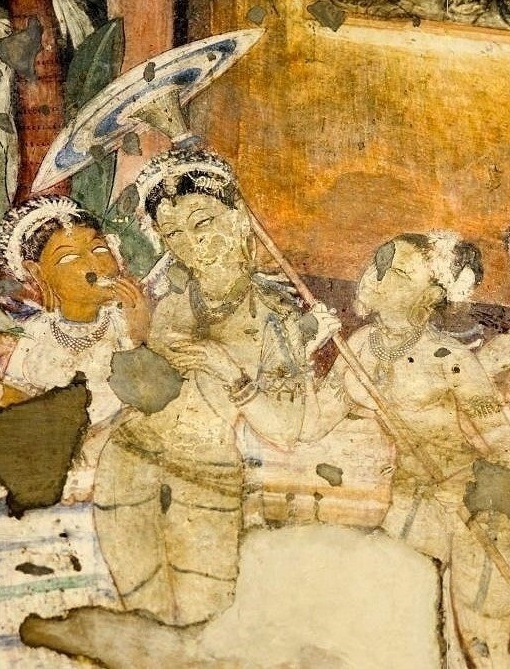
Women in choli (blouse) and antariya c. 320 CE, Gupta Empire

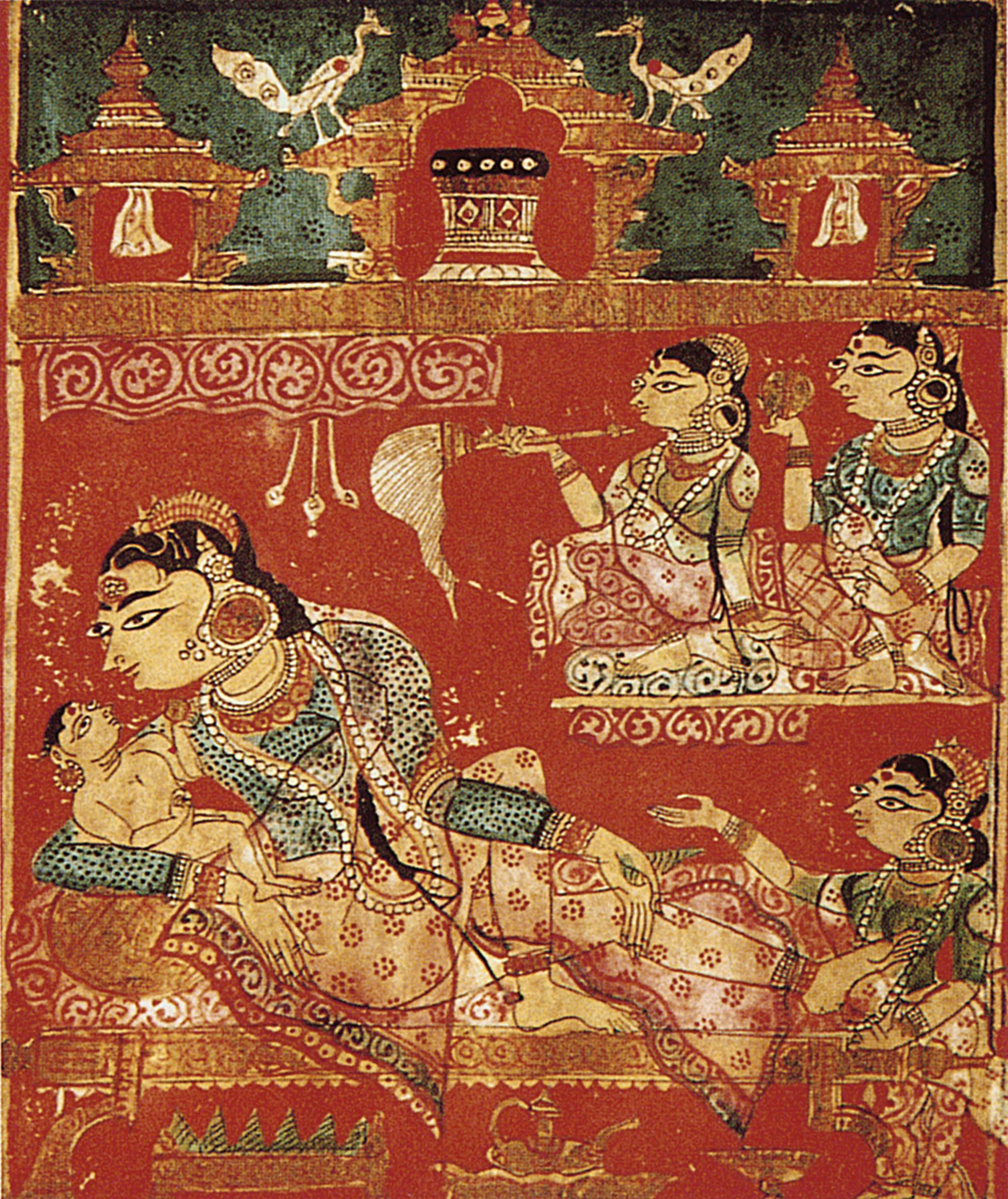
Kalpa Sūtra manuscript c. 1375 CE

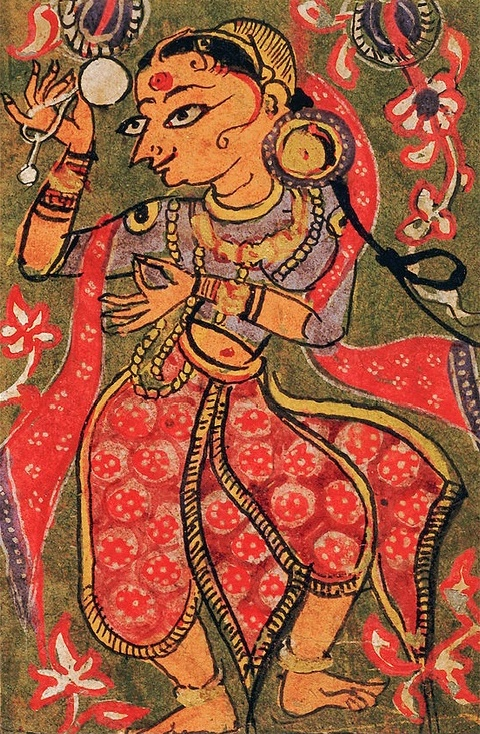
Dancing women depicted in three-piece attire, Kalpa Sutra manuscript 1375 CE

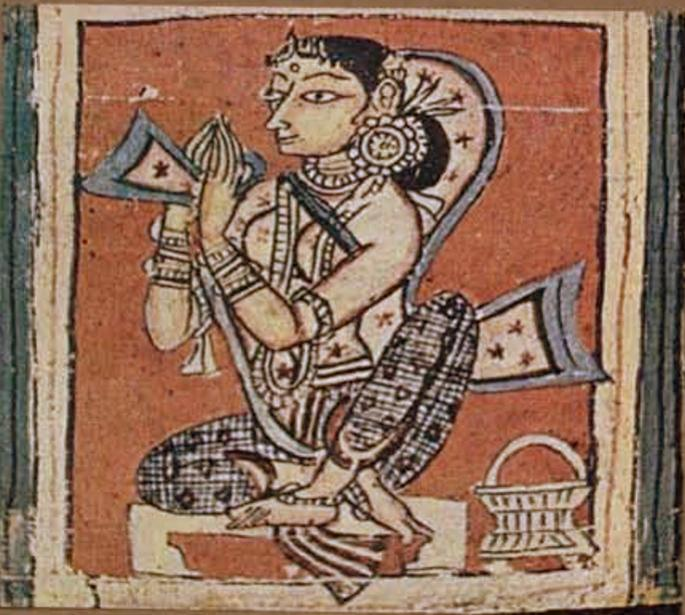
Women dressed in sari, Kalpa sutra manuscript, ca 1375 CE

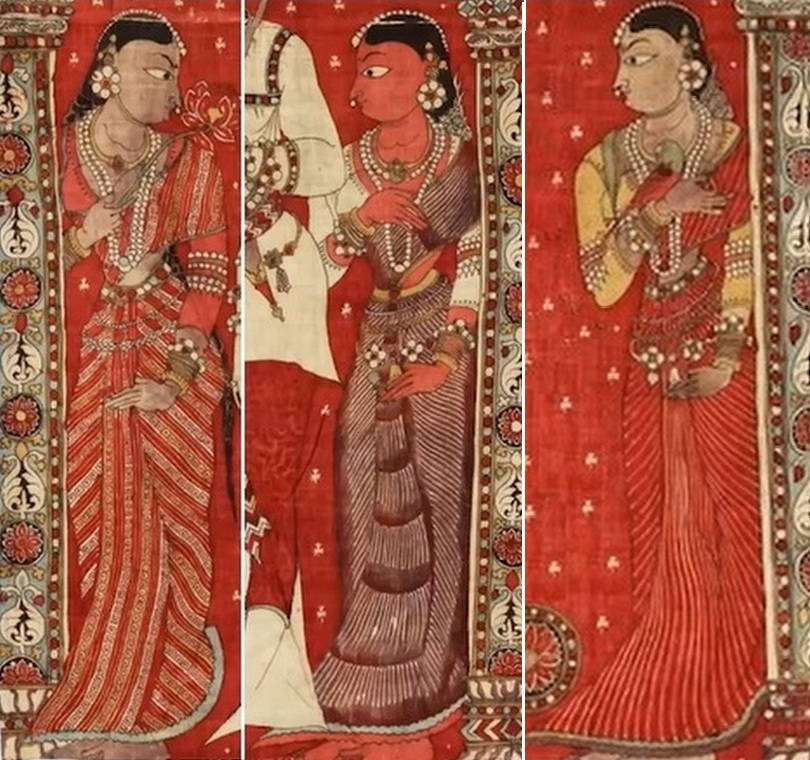
Women dressed in sari, deccan, c. 1640–50

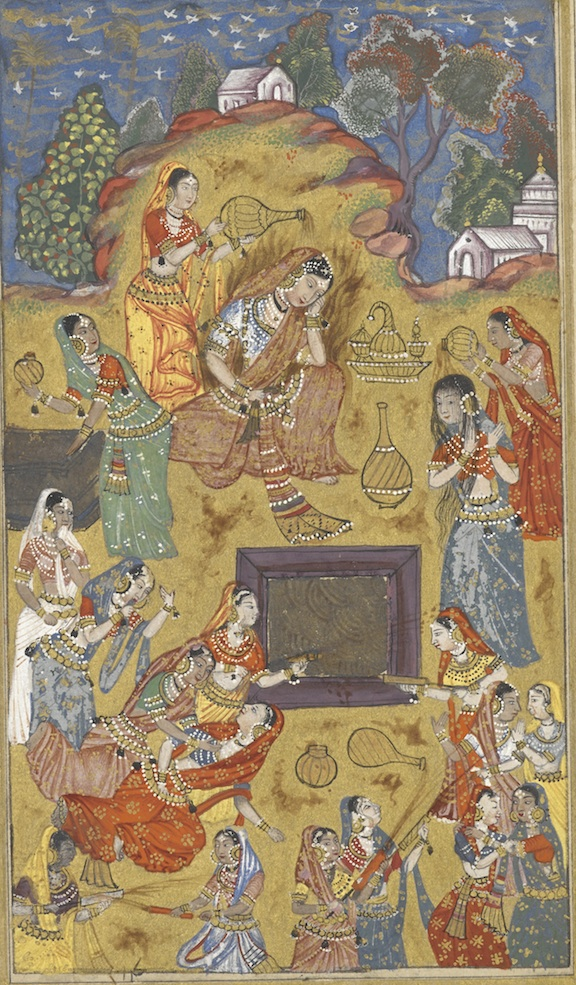
Women dressed in sari, c.1600s

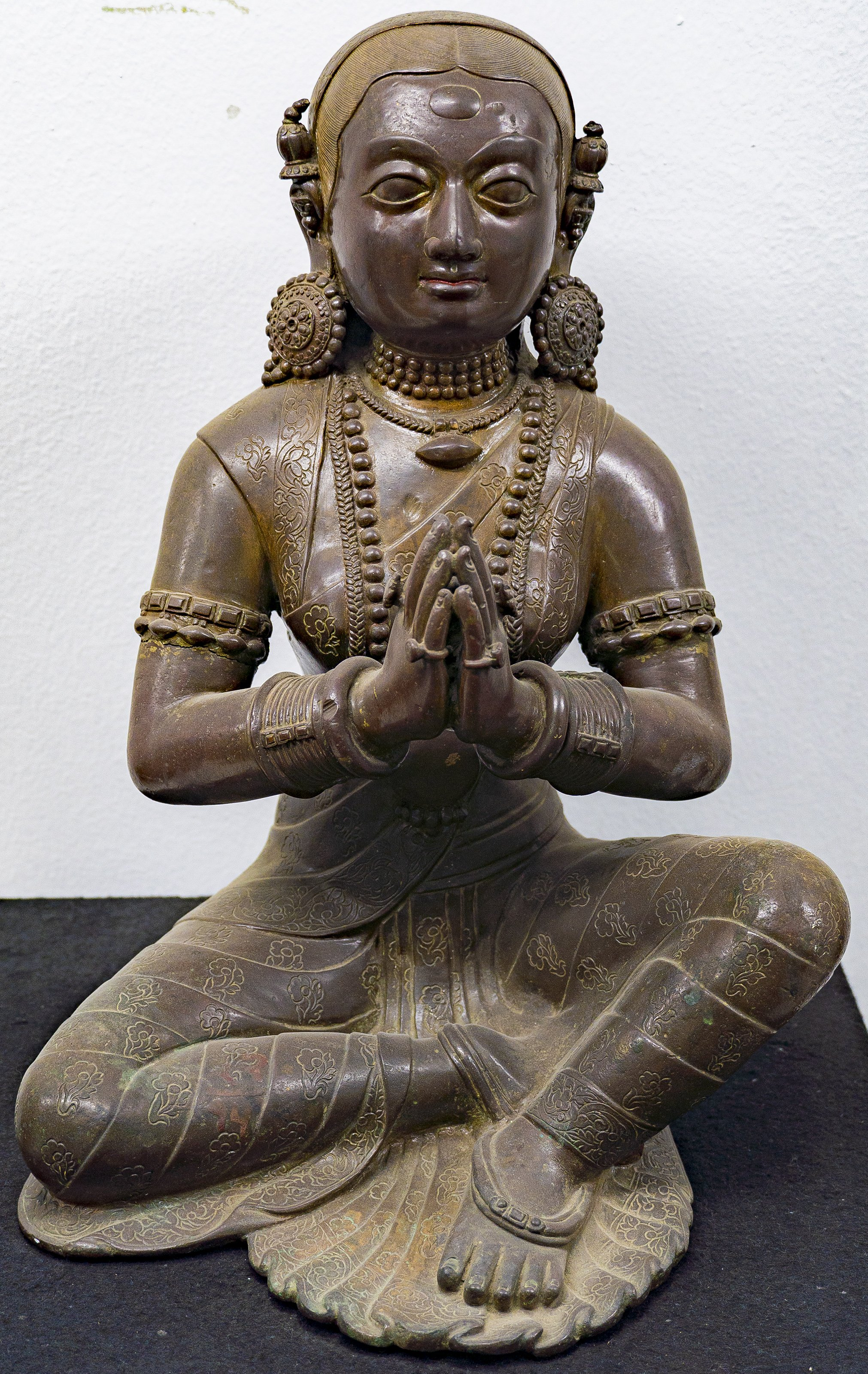
Bronze portrait of Malla queen, 1696-1722 CE, Nepal

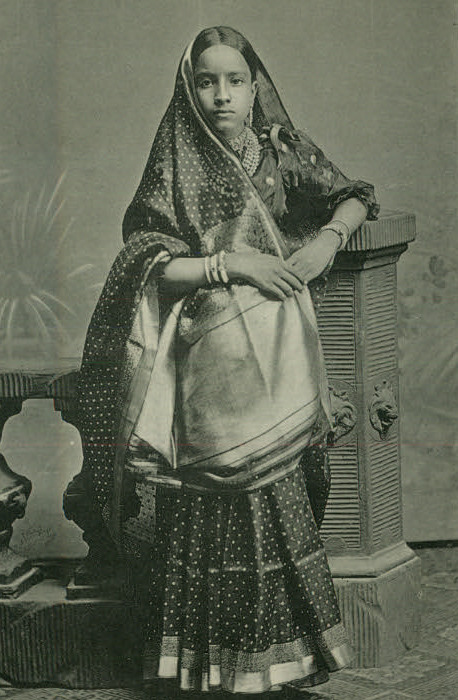
Girl in Gujarati sari; in this style, the loose end is worn on the front

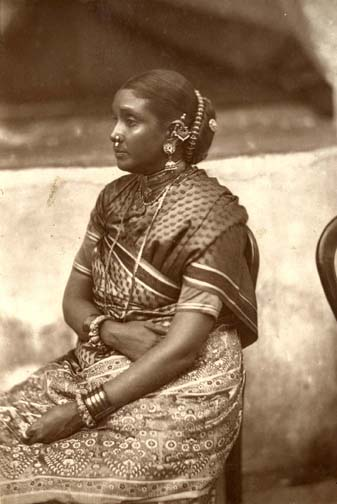
Woman in Tamil sari; in this style, the loose end is wrapped around the waist

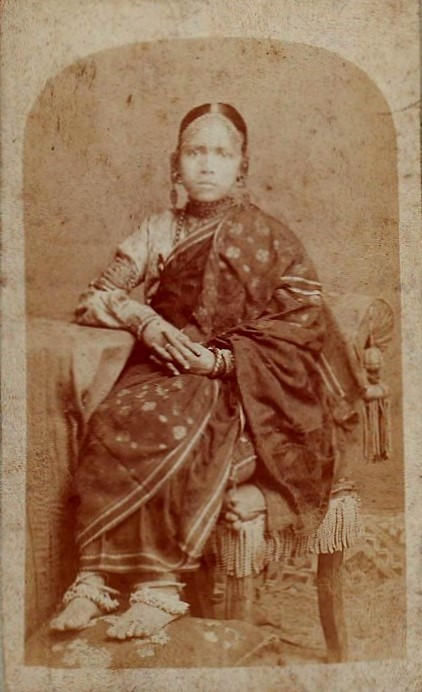
Girl in Bengali sari; in this style sari is worn without any pleats

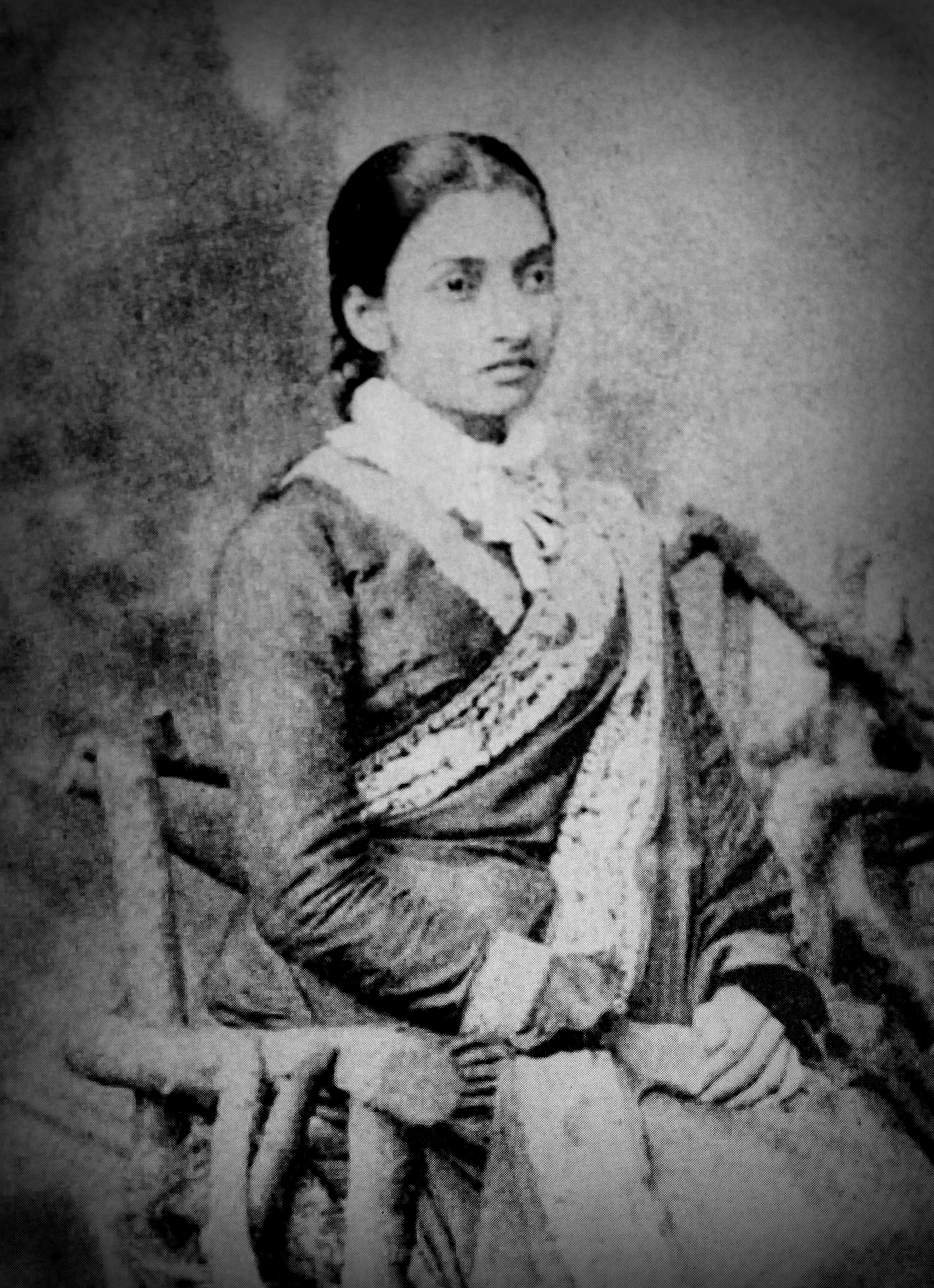
Jnanadanandini Devi styling the Bengali drape with British-style blouse with lace collar

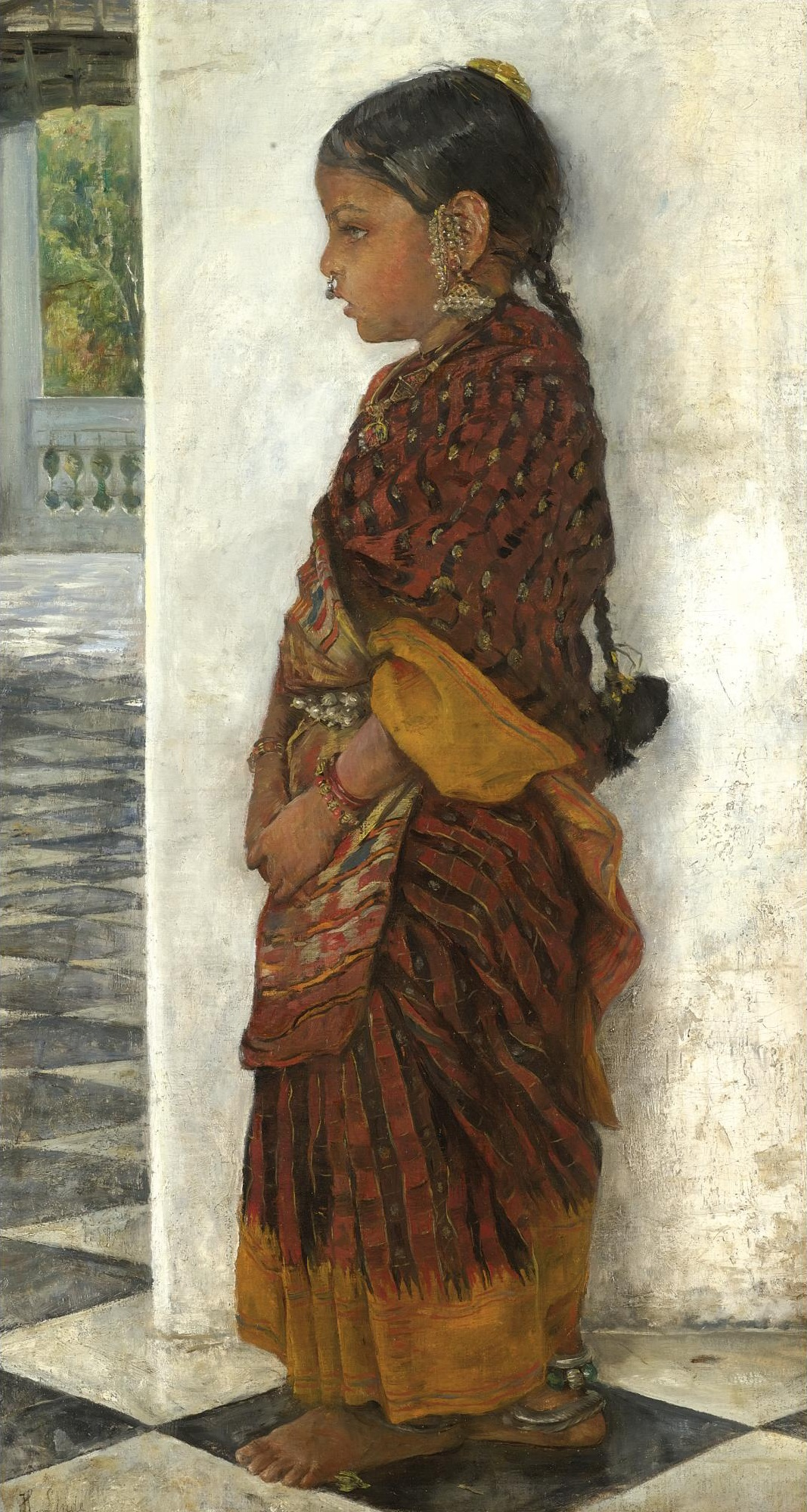
Girl in Pochampally Ikkat sari worn in Nivi style, 1895 CE

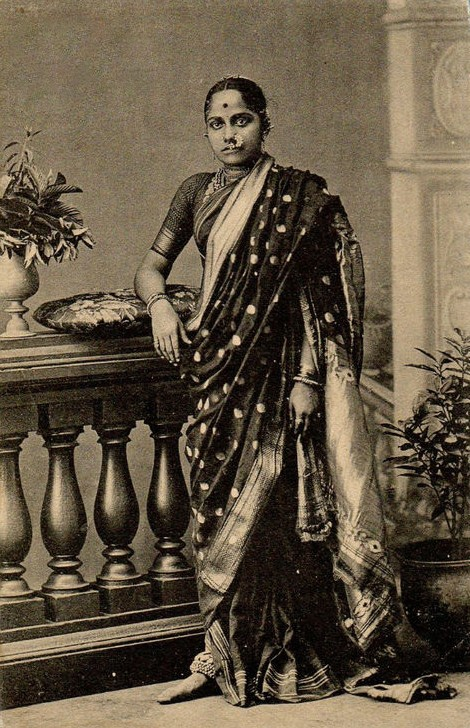
Woman in Nauvari sari

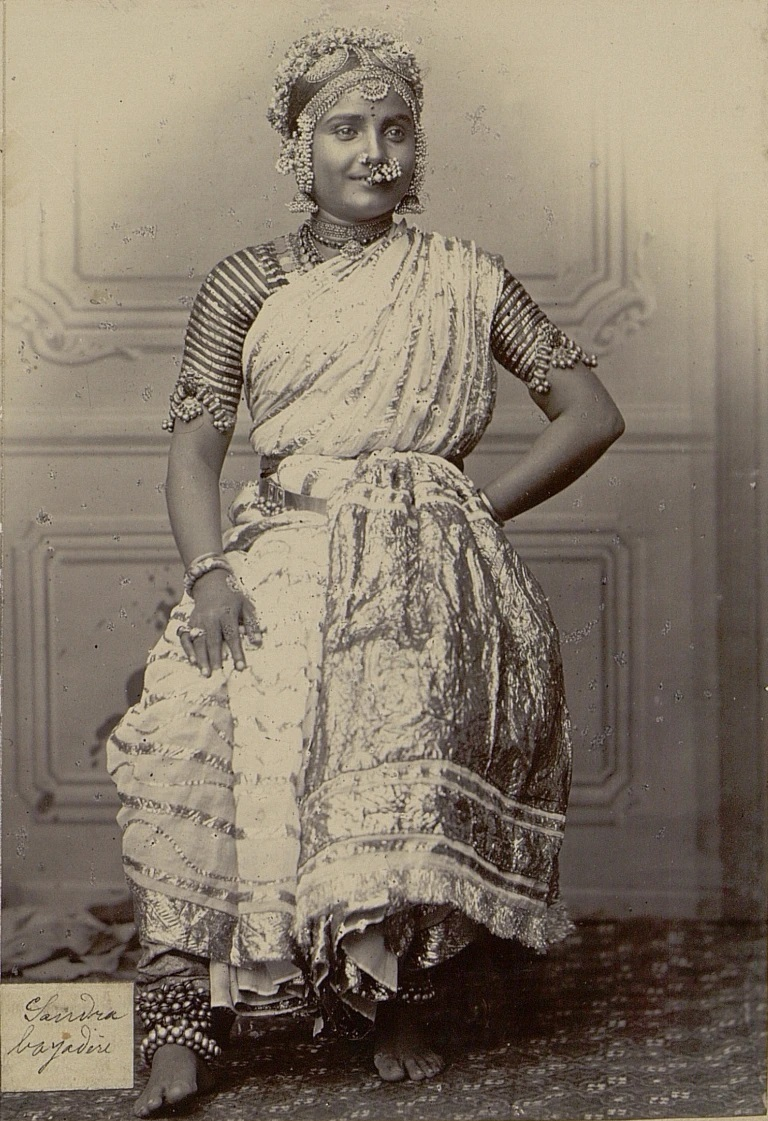
Tamil dancer dressed in sari, c. 1850

=== Nivi style ===
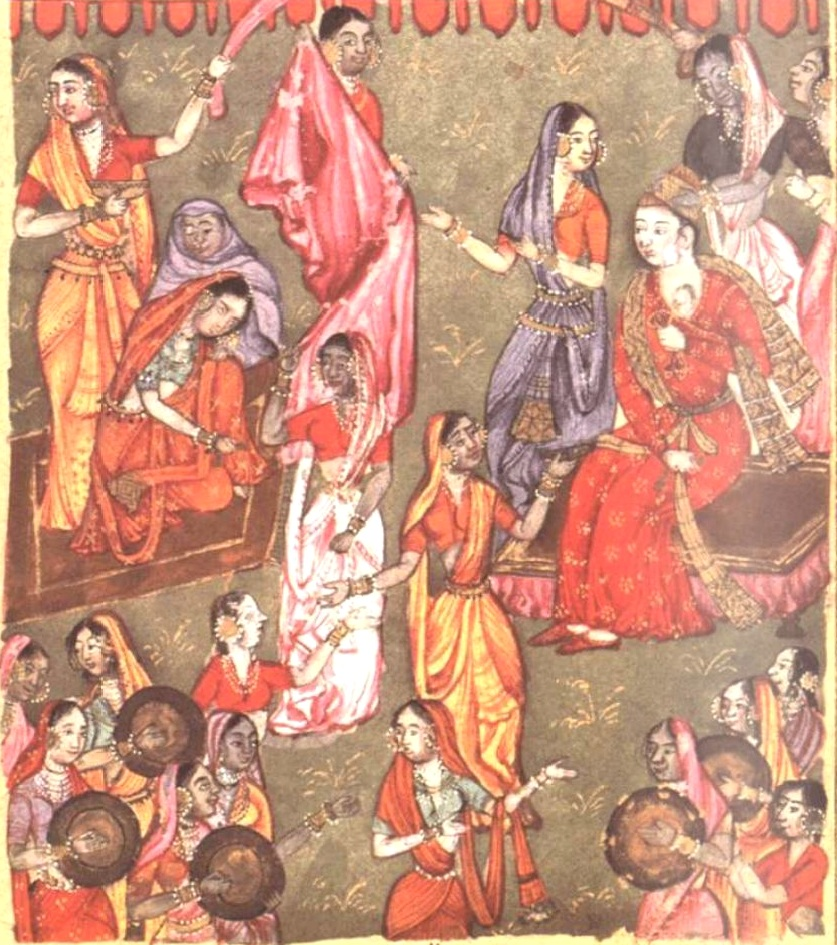
Women dressed in nivi sari entertaining couple, Deccan, 1591 CE

The Nivi is the most common style of sari worn today. It originated in the Deccan region. In the Deccan region, the Nivi existed in two styles, a style similar to modern Nivi and the second style worn with front pleats of Nivi tucked in the back.

The increased interactions during colonial era saw most women from royal families come out of purdah in the 1900s. This necessitated a change of dress. Maharani Indira Devi of Cooch Behar popularised the chiffon sari. She was widowed early in life and followed the convention of abandoning her richly woven Baroda shalus in favour of the unadorned mourning white as per tradition. Characteristically, she transformed her "mourning" clothes into high fashion. She had saris woven in France to her personal specifications, in white chiffon, and introduced the silk chiffon sari to the royal fashion repertoire.

Under colonial rule, the petticoat was adopted, along with Victorian styles of puffed-sleeved blouses, which was commonly seen among the elites in Bombay presidency and Bengal presidency. Nivi drape starts with one end of the sari tucked into the waistband of the petticoat, usually a plain skirt. The cloth is wrapped around the lower body once, then hand-gathered into even pleats below the navel. The pleats are tucked into the waistband of the petticoat. They create a graceful, decorative effect which poets have likened to the petals of a flower. After one more turn around the waist, the loose end is draped over the shoulder. The loose end is called the aanchal, pallu, pallav, seragu, or paita depending on the language. It is draped diagonally in front of the torso. It is worn across the right hip to over the left shoulder, partly baring the midriff. The navel can be revealed or concealed by the wearer by adjusting the pallu, depending on the social setting. The long end of the pallu hanging from the back of the shoulder is often intricately decorated. The pallu may be hanging freely, tucked in at the waist, used to cover the head, or used to cover the neck, by draping it across the right shoulder as well. Some Nivi styles are worn with the pallu draped from the back towards the front, coming from the back over the right shoulder with one corner tucked by the left hip, covering the torso/waist. The Nivi sari was popularised through the paintings of Raja Ravi Varma. In one of his paintings, the Indian subcontinent was shown as a mother wearing a flowing Nivi sari. The ornaments sometimes worn in the midriff region on top of a sari are waist chains. They are sometimes worn as a part of bridal jewellery.

== Professional style of draping ==
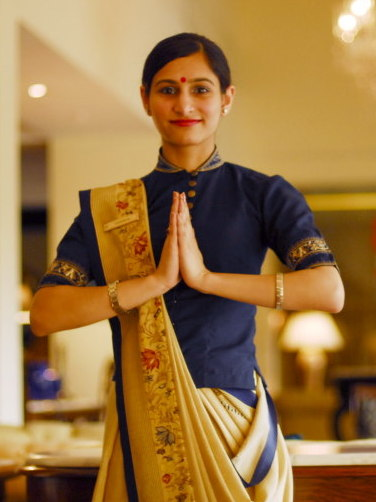
A female hotel staff member wearing a sari as a uniform

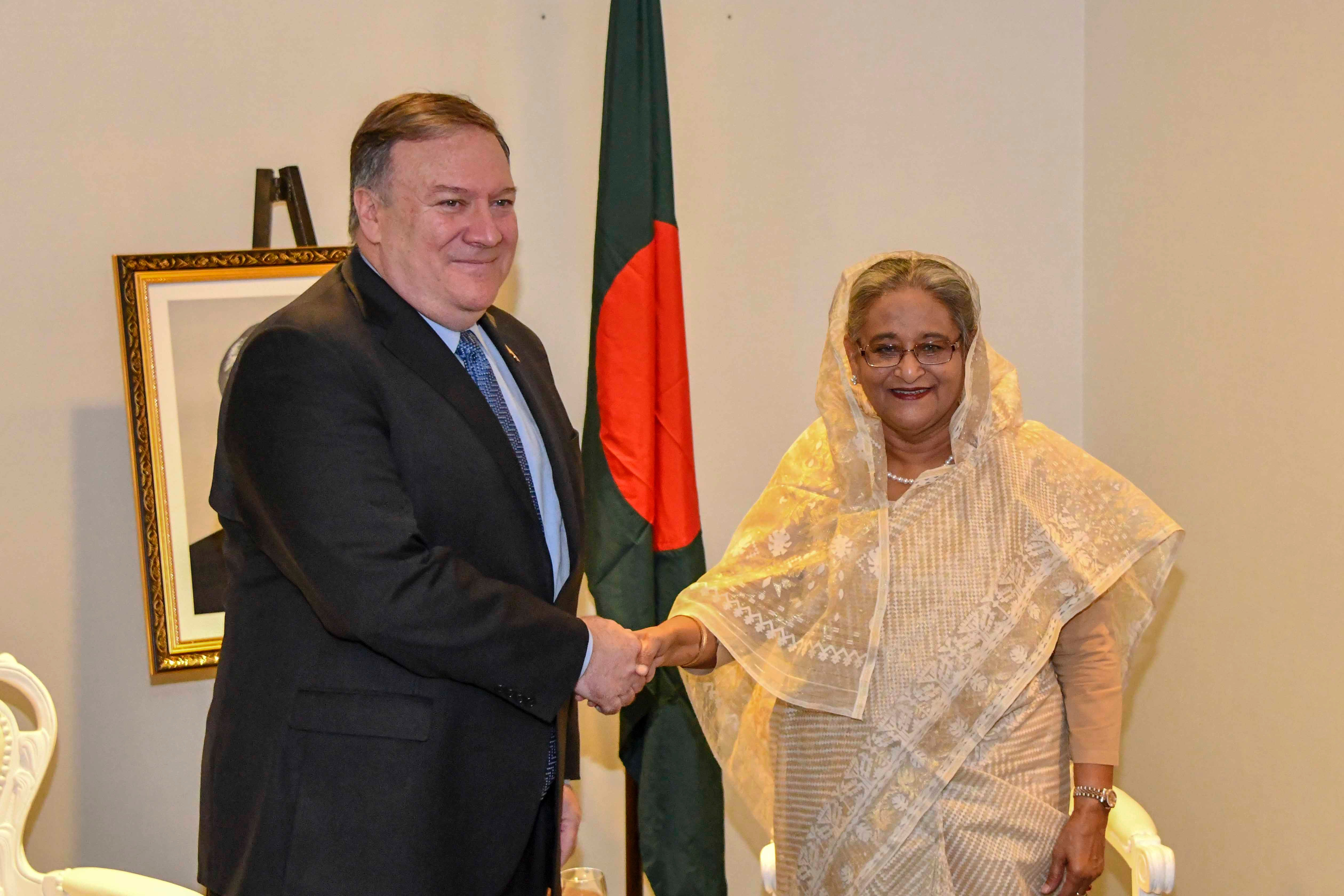
Former Prime Minister of Bangladesh Sheikh Hasina in an ivory and gold jamdani sari

Saris are worn as uniforms by the female hotel staff of many five-star luxury hotels in India, Sri Lanka, and Bangladesh as the symbol of Indian, Sri Lankan, and Bangladeshi culture, respectively. It also used by the air hostesses of Air India as uniform. Similarly, the female politicians of all three countries wear the sari in a professional manner. Bangladeshi politicians usually wear saris with long sleeve blouse while covering their midriff. Some politicians pair up saris with hijabs or shawls for more coverage.

The women of the Nehru–Gandhi family like Indira Gandhi and Sonia Gandhi have worn a special blouse for the campaign trail which is longer than usual and is tucked in to prevent any midriff showing while waving to the crowds. Stylist Prasad Bidapa has to say, "I think Sonia Gandhi is the country's most stylish politician. But that's because she's inherited the best collection of saris from her mother-in-law. I'm also happy that she supports the Indian handloom industry with her selection."

Most female MPs in the Sri Lankan Parliament wear a Kandyan osari. This includes prominent women in politics, the first female premier in the world, Sirimavo Bandaranaike and President Chandrika Bandaranaike Kumaratunga. Contemporary examples include Pavithra Wanniarachchi, the sitting health minister in Cabinet. The adoption of the sari is not exclusive to Sinhalese politicians; Muslim MP Ferial Ashraff combined a hijab with her sari while in Parliament.

== Saris in various countries ==
=== Bangladesh ===
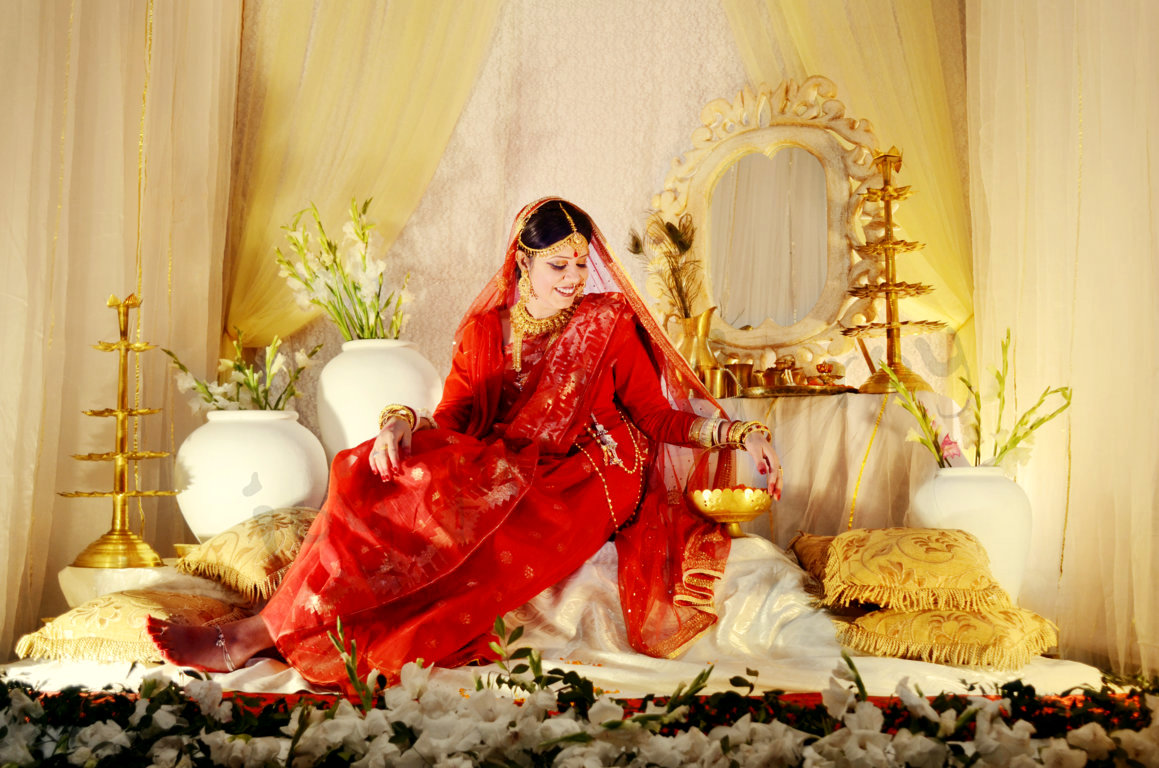
Traditional Bengali bridal Jamdani sari in red

Sari is the national attire for women in Bangladesh, Although Dhakai Jamdani (hand made sari) is worldwide known and most famous to all women who wear sari but there are also many variety of saris in Bangladesh. There are many regional variations of them in both silk and cotton.

There are many regional variations of saris in both silk and cotton. e.g., Dhakai Banarasi sari, Rajshahi silk, Tangail sari, Tant sari, Tassar silk sari, Manipuri sari and Katan sari.

The sari is reserved as the dress of choice for important occasions and events. In 2013, the traditional art of weaving jamdani was declared a UNESCO Intangible Cultural Heritage of Humanity. In 2016, Bangladesh received geographical indication (GI) status for Jamdani sari.

=== Sri Lanka ===
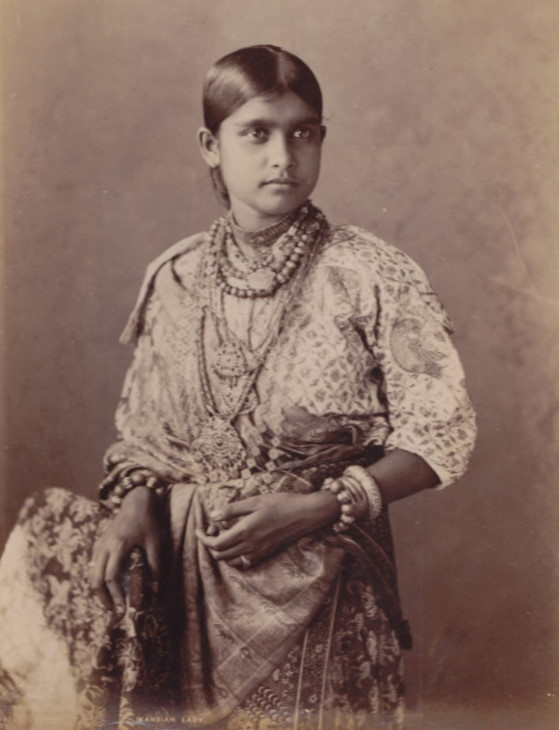
Kandyan Sinhalese lady wearing a traditional Kandyan sari (osaria)

Sri Lankan women wear saris in many styles. Two ways of draping the sari are popular and tend to dominate: the Indian style (classic nivi drape) and the Kandyan style (or Osariya in Sinhala). The Kandyan style is generally more popular in the hill country region of Kandy from which the style gets its name. Though local preferences play a role, most women decide on style depending on personal preference or what is perceived to be most flattering for their figure.

The traditional Kandyan (Osariya) style consists of a full blouse which covers the midriff completely and is partially tucked in at the front. However, the modern intermingling of styles has led to most wearers exposing the navel. The final tail of the sari is neatly pleated rather than free-flowing. This is rather similar to the pleated rosette used in the Pin Kosuvam style noted earlier in the article.

The Kandyan style is considered the national dress of Sinhalese women. It is the uniform of the air hostesses of SriLankan Airlines.

During the 1960s, the mini sari known as 'hipster' sari created a wrinkle in Sri Lankan fashion, since it was worn below the navel and barely above the line of prosecution for indecent exposure. The conservative people described the 'hipster' as "an absolute travesty of a beautiful costume almost a desecration" and "a hideous and purposeless garment".

=== Nepal ===
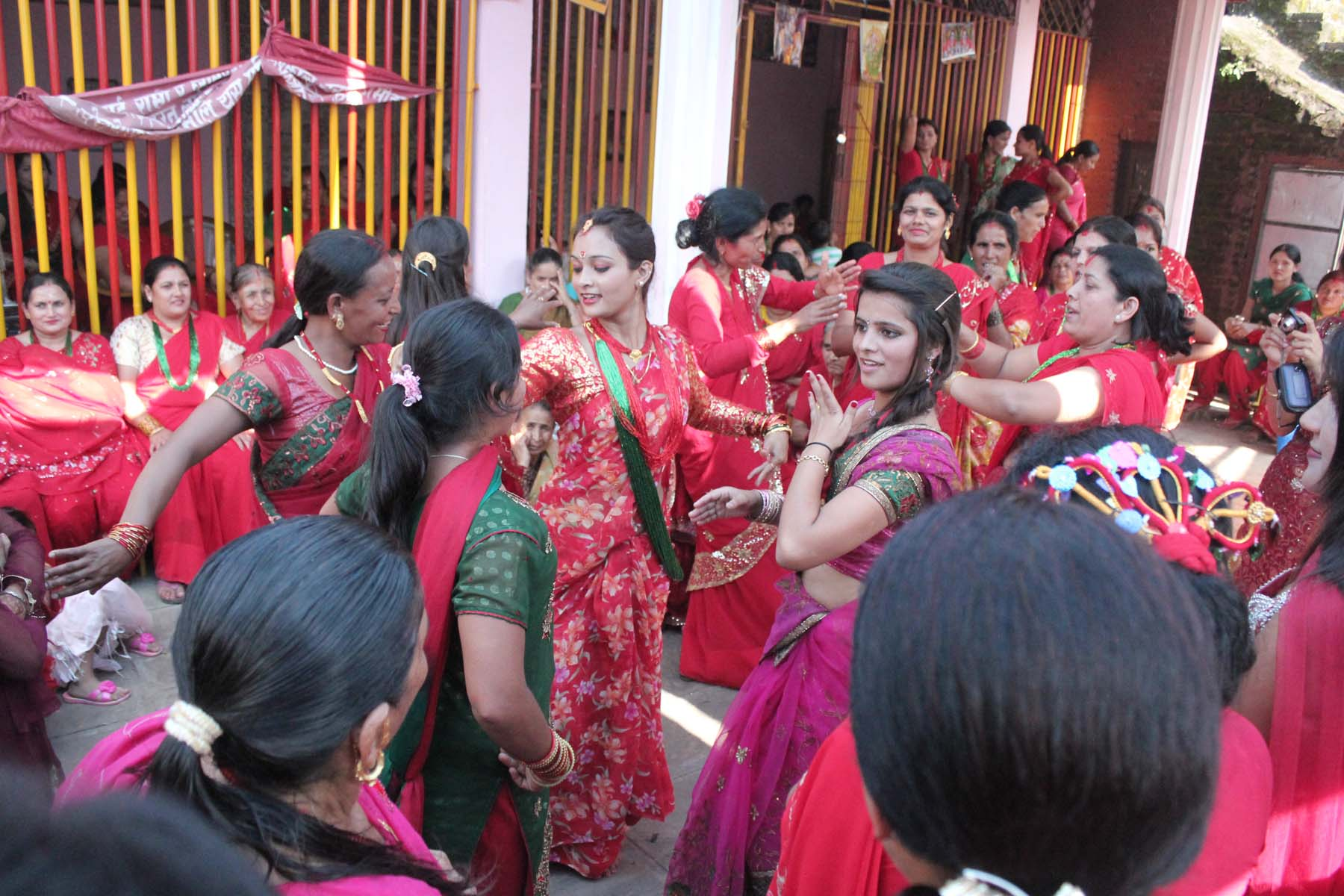
Nepal women in sari during festival of Teej

The sari is the most commonly worn women's clothing in Nepal where a special style of sari draping is called haku patasihh. The sari is draped around the waist and a shawl is worn covering the upper half of the sari, which is used in place of a pallu.

=== Pakistan ===
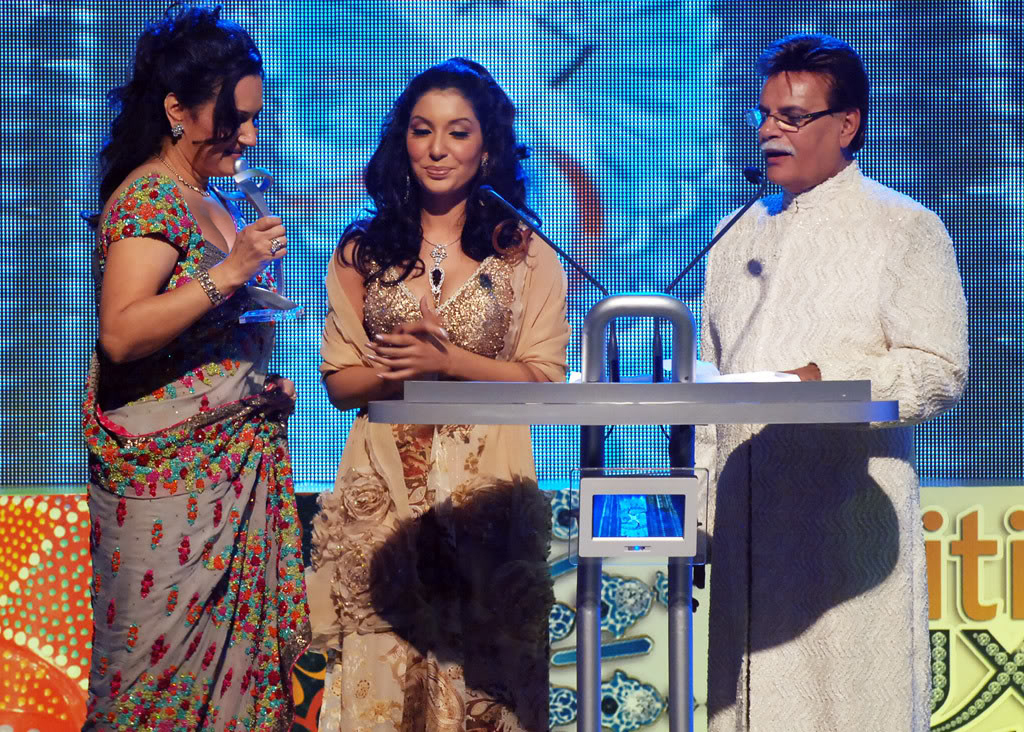
Pakistani actress Bushra Ansari in a sari at Lux Style Awards

In Pakistan, the sari has historically had a complex history of usage, but today, it is still very popular and worn on special occasions. Back in the 1970s and 1980s, the garment was viewed as un-Islamic and inappropriate, with the military dictator, Zia-ul-Haq promulgating directives against government employees wearing it or public displays of the same. The Shalwar kameez, however, is worn throughout the country on a daily basis. However, the sari still remains a popular garment among the middle and upper class for many formal functions. Saris can frequently be seen worn in metropolitan cities such as Karachi and Islamabad and are worn for weddings and other business types of functions. Mukaish, Kota doria, Banarasi are the most worn. The sari is worn as daily wear by Pakistani Hindus and by elderly Muslim women who were used to wearing it in pre-partition India.

== Similarities with other Asian clothing ==
While the sari is typical traditional wear for women in the Indian subcontinent, clothing worn by women in Southeast Asian countries like Myanmar, Malaysia, Indonesia, the Philippines, Cambodia, Thailand and Laos resemble it, where a long rectangular piece of cloth is draped around the body. These are different from the sari as they are wrapped around the lower-half of body as a skirt, worn with a shirt/blouse and resemble a sarong, as seen in the Burmese longyi (Burmese: လုံချည်, MLCTS: lum hkyany; IPA: [lòʊɰ̃dʑì]), Filipino malong and tapis, Laotian xout lao (Lao: ຊຸດລາວ; IPA: [sut.láːw]), Laotian and Thai suea pat (Lao: ເສື້ອປັດ; pronounced [sɯ̏a.pát]) and sinh (Lao: ສິ້ນ, IPA: [sȉn]; Thai: ซิ่น, RTGS: sin, IPA: [sîn]), Cambodian sbai (Khmer: ស្បៃ) and sampot (Khmer: សំពត់, saṃbát, IPA: [sɑmpʊət]) and Timorese tais. Saris, worn predominantly in the Indian subcontinent are usually draped with one end of the cloth fastened around the waist, and the other end placed over the shoulder exposing the midriff.

== Ornamentation and decorative accessories ==
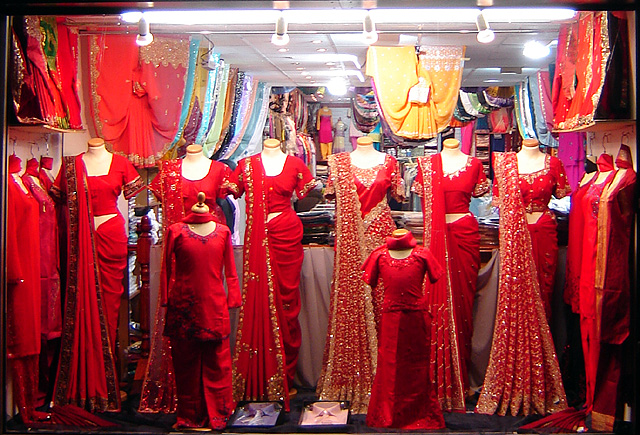
Display of traditional saris with gota patti embroidery for festive occasions at clothing store

Saris are woven with one plain end (the end that is concealed inside the wrap), two long decorative borders running the length of the sari, and a one to three-foot section at the other end which continues and elaborates the length-wise decoration. This end is called the pallu; it is the part thrown over the shoulder in the nivi style of draping.

In past times, saris were woven of silk or cotton. The rich could afford finely woven, diaphanous silk saris that, according to folklore, could be passed through a finger ring. The poor wore coarsely woven cotton saris. All saris were handwoven and represented a considerable investment of time or money.

Simple hand-woven villagers' saris are often decorated with checks or stripes woven into the cloth. Inexpensive saris were also decorated with block printing using carved wooden blocks and vegetable dyes, or tie-dyeing, known in India as bhandani work.

More expensive saris had elaborate geometric, floral, or figurative ornaments or brocades created on the loom, as part of the fabric. Sometimes warp and weft threads were tie-dyed and then woven, creating ikat patterns. Sometimes threads of different colours were woven into the base fabric in patterns; an ornamented border, an elaborate pallu, and often, small repeated accents in the cloth itself. These accents are called butti or bhutti (spellings vary). For fancy saris, these patterns could be woven with gold or silver thread, which is called zari work.

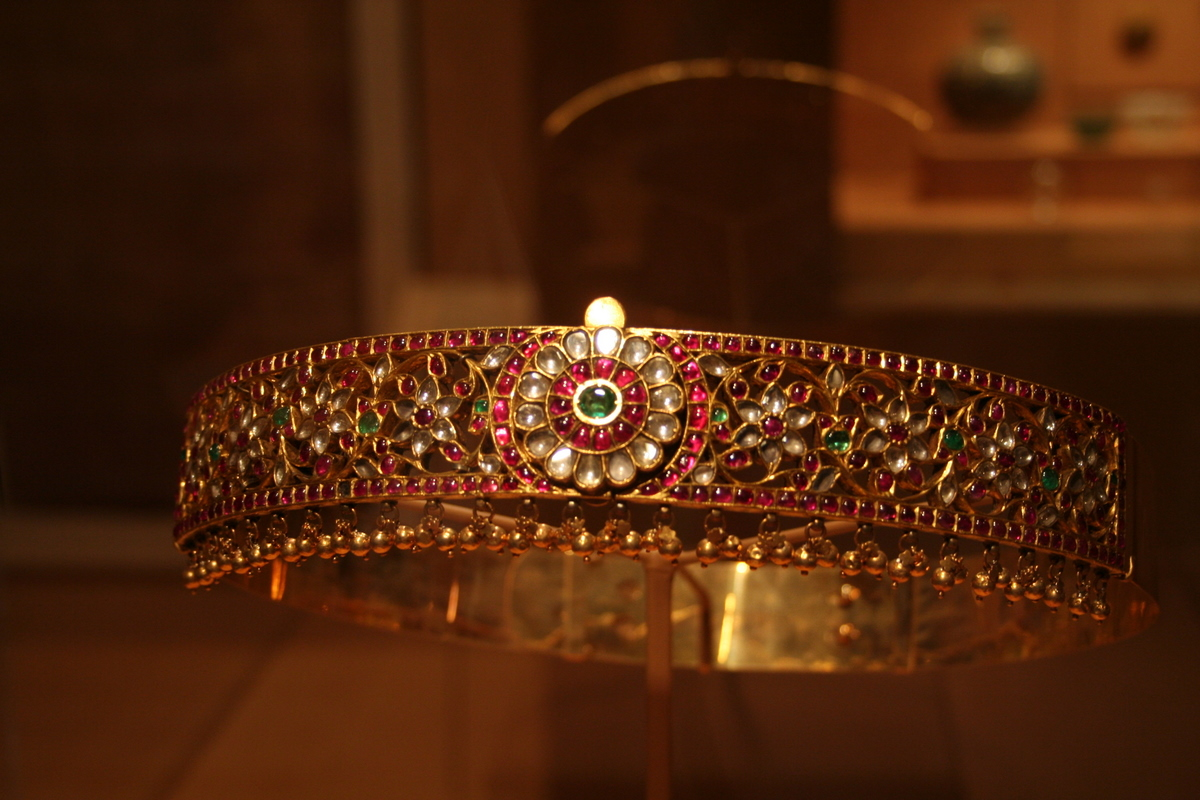
A vaddanam or kamarband is a type of sari belt used to keep complex drapes in place.

Sometimes the saris were further decorated, after weaving, with various sorts of embroidery. Resham work is embroidery done with coloured silk thread. Zardozi embroidery uses gold and silver thread, and sometimes pearls and precious stones. Cheap modern versions of zardozi use synthetic metallic thread and imitation stones, such as fake pearls and Swarovski crystals.

In modern times, saris are increasingly woven on mechanical looms and made of artificial fibres, such as polyester, nylon, or rayon, which do not require starching or ironing. They are printed by machine, or woven in simple patterns made with floats across the back of the sari. This can create an elaborate appearance on the front, while looking ugly on the back. The punchra work is imitated with inexpensive machine-made tassel trim. Fashion designer Shaina NC declared, "I can drape a sari in 54 different styles".

Hand-woven, hand-decorated saris are naturally much more expensive than the machine imitations. While the overall market for handweaving has plummeted (leading to much distress among Indian handweavers), hand-woven saris are still popular for weddings and other grand social occasions.

== Saris outside the Indian subcontinent ==
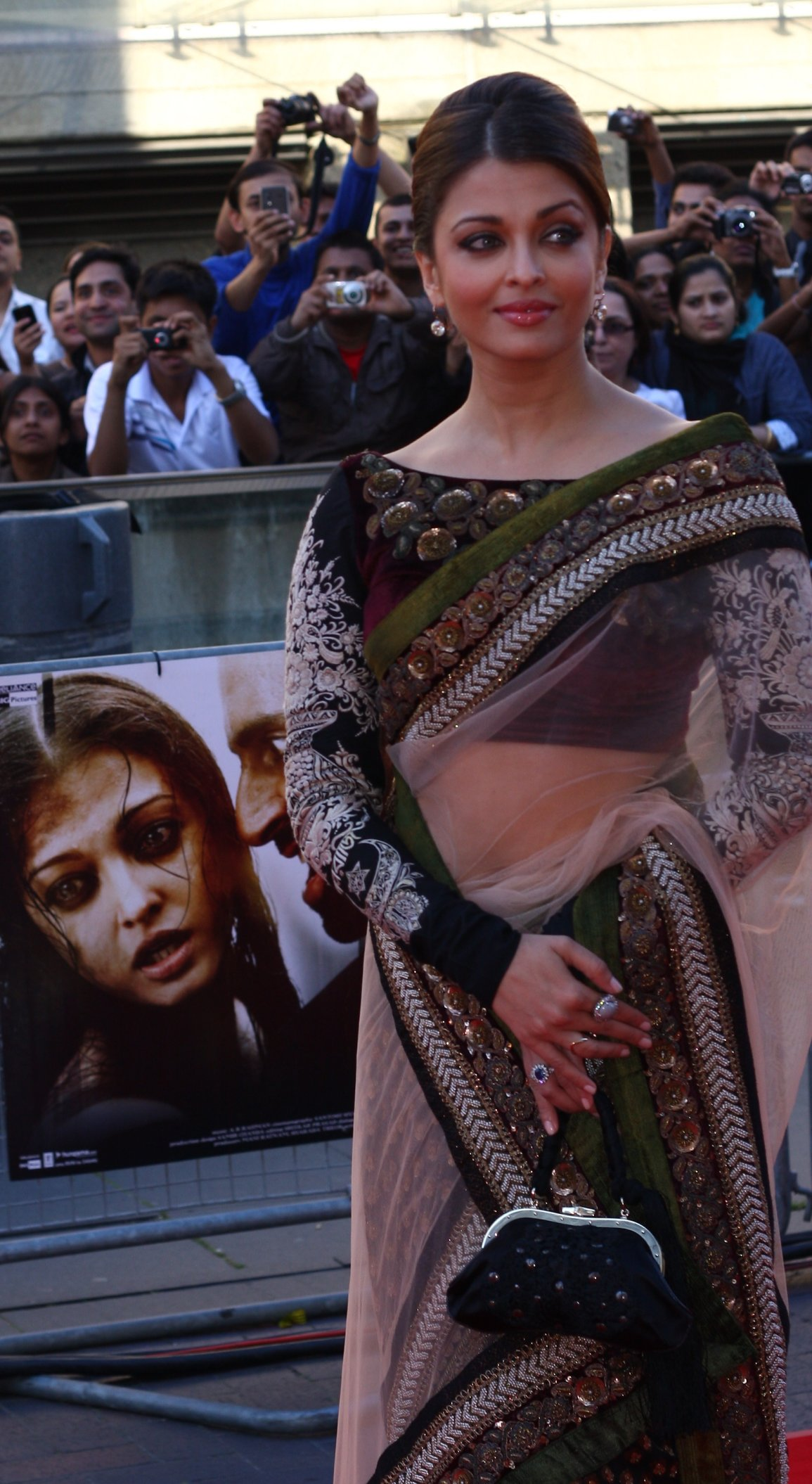
Aishwarya Rai in a sari at the London premiere of her film Raavan

The traditional sari made an impact in the United States during the 1970s. Eugene Novack who ran the New York store, Royal Sari House commented that he had initially been selling mainly to Indian women in the New York area. However, many American business women and housewives soon became his customers, favouring styles resembling western attire such as gowns. He also said that men appeared intrigued by the fragility and the femininity it confers on the wearer. Newcomers to the sari report that it is comfortable to wear, requiring no girdles or stockings and that the flowing garb feels so feminine with unusual grace.

The sari has gained its popularity internationally because of the growth of Indian fashion trends globally. Many Bollywood celebrities, like Aishwarya Rai, have worn it at international events representing India's cultural heritage. In 2010, Bollywood actress Deepika Padukone wanted to represent her country at an international event, wearing the national costume. On her first red carpet appearance at the Cannes International Film Festival, she stepped out on the red carpet in a Rohit Bal sari.

Many foreign celebrities have worn traditional sari attire designed by Indian fashion designers. American actress Pamela Anderson made a surprise guest appearance on Bigg Boss, the Indian version of Big Brother, dressed in a sari that was specially designed for her by Mumbai-based fashion designer Ashley Rebello. Ashley Judd donned a purple sari at the YouthAIDS Benefit Gala in November 2007 at the Ritz Carlton in Mclean, Virginia. There was an Indian flavour to the red carpet at the annual Fashion Rocks concert in New York, with designer Rocky S walking the ramp along with Jessica, Ashley, Nicole, Kimberly and Melody – the Pussycat Dolls – dressed in saris. in 2014, American singer Selena Gomez was seen in a sari for a UNICEF charity event at Nepal.

In the United States, the sari has recently become politicised with the digital-movement, "Sari, Not Sorry". Tanya Rawal-Jindia, a gender studies professor at UC Riverside, initiated this anti-xenophobia fashion-campaign on Instagram.

While an international image of the modern style sari may have been popularised by airline flight attendants, each region in the Indian subcontinent has developed, over the centuries, its own unique sari style. Following are other well-known varieties, distinct on the basis of fabric, weaving style, or motif, in the Indian subcontinent.

== Handloom and textiles ==
Handloom sari weaving is one of India's cottage industries. The handloom weaving process requires several stages in order to produce the final product. Traditionally the processes of dyeing (during the yarn, fabric, or garment stage), warping, sizing, attaching the warp, weft winding and weaving were done by weavers and local specialists around weaving towns and villages.

=== Northern and Central styles ===
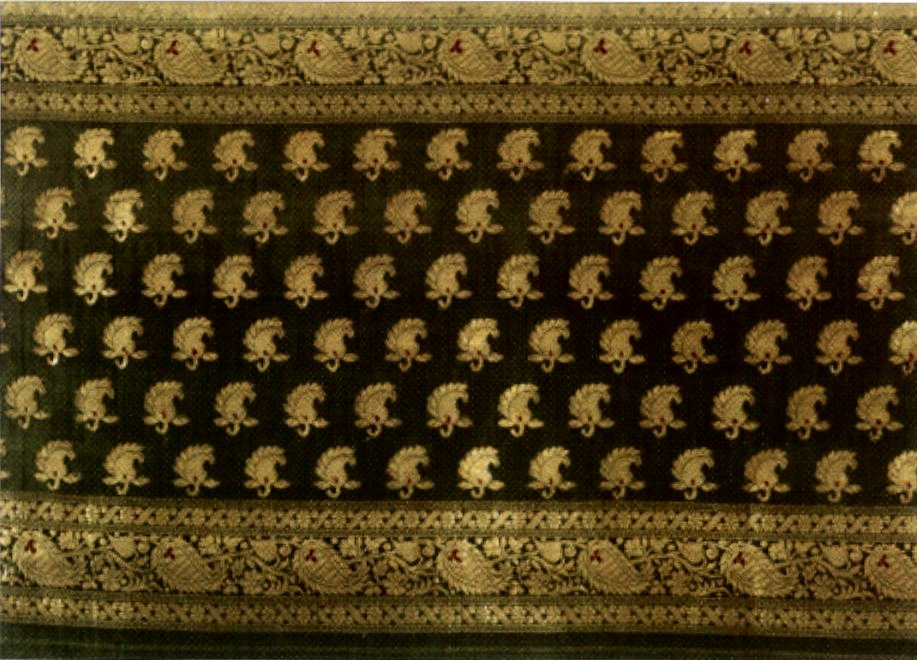
Banarasi sari

- Banarasi – Uttar Pradesh
- Shalu – Uttar Pradesh
- Tanchoi – Uttar Pradesh
- Pattu – Himachal Pradesh
- Chanderi sari – Madhya Pradesh
- Maheshwari – Maheshwar, Madhya Pradesh
- Kosa silk – Chhattisgarh
- Dhokra silk – Madhya Pradesh
- Tussar silk- Bhagalpur, Bihar
- Aari Kashida- Bihar
- Zari Chhaapa- Bihar
- Baavan Booti weave- Bihar
- Madhubani sari- Mithila, Bihar
- Sujni sari- Bihar
- Pindna cotton sari- Jharkhand

=== Eastern styles ===
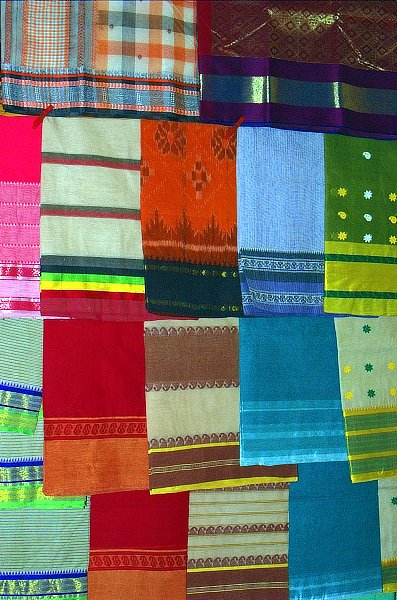
Tant sari for daily wear in Bangladesh

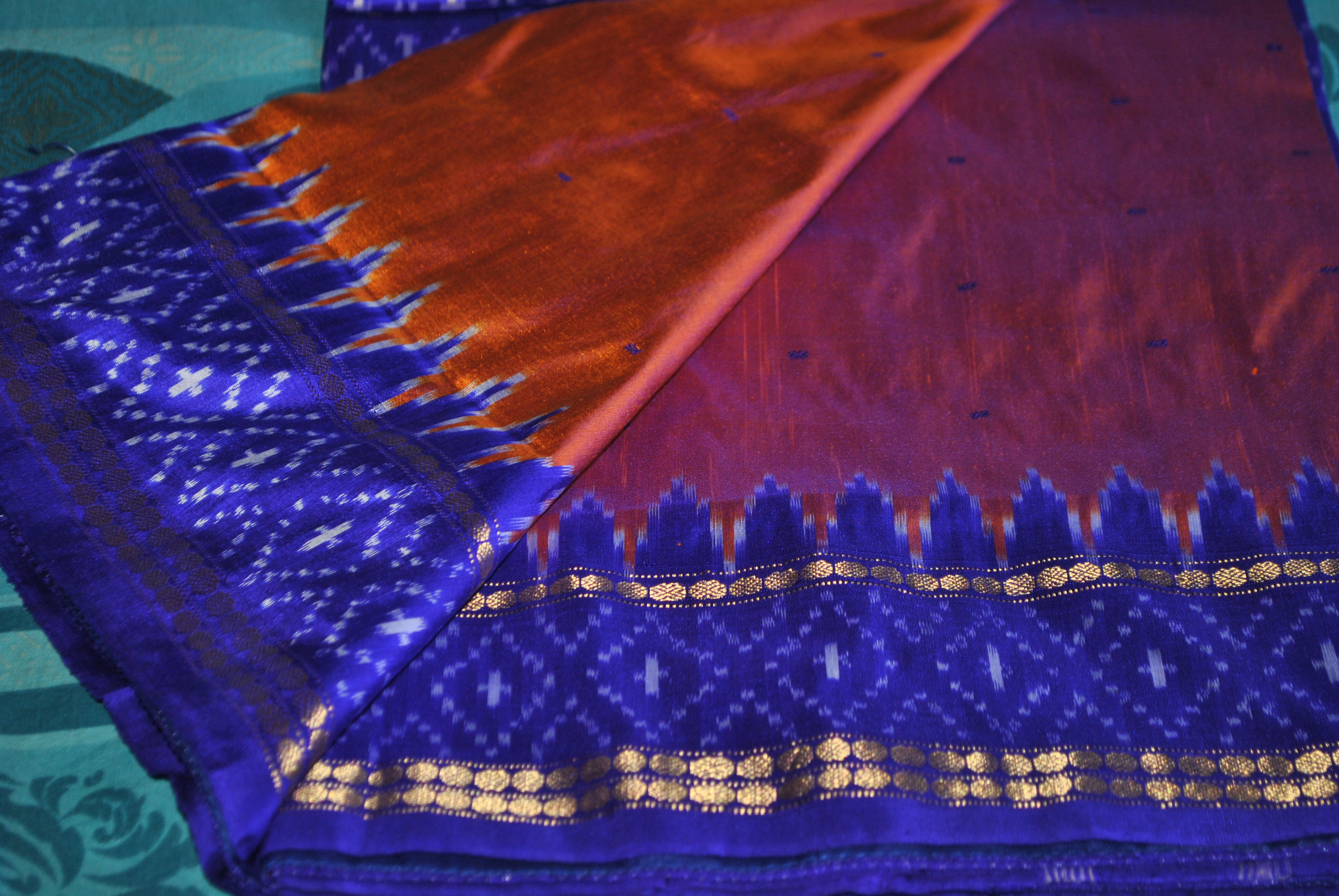
Sambalpuri sari

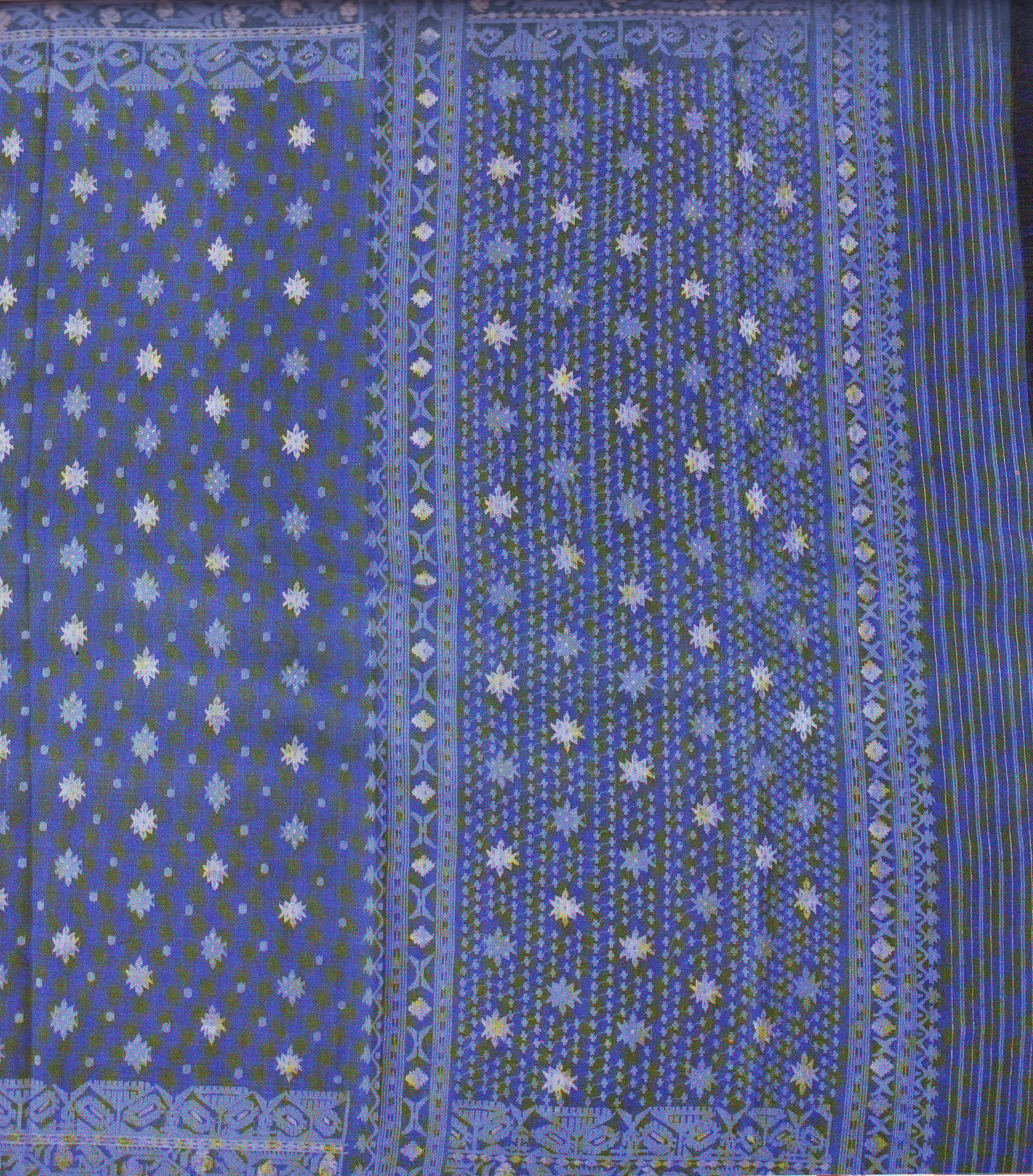
Jamdani sari of Bangladesh

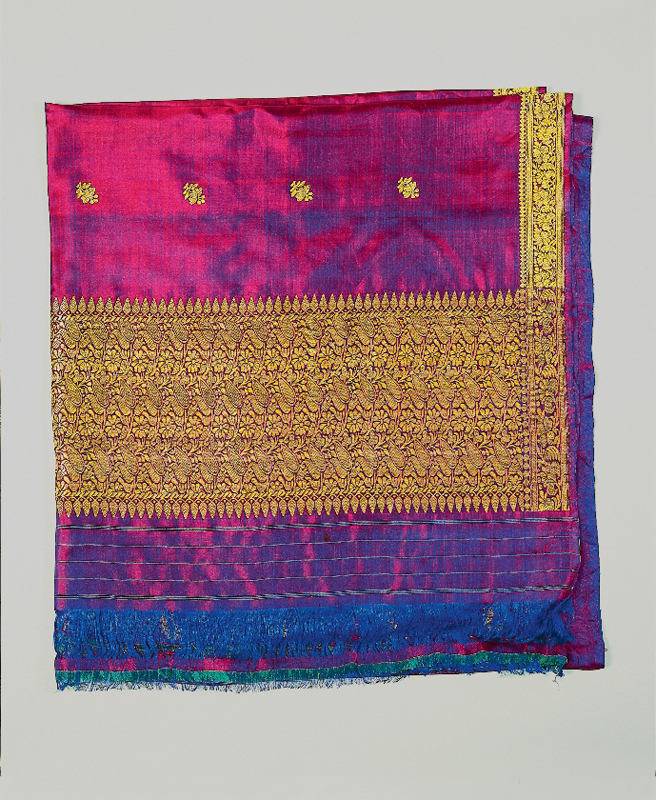
Silk sari from India (1970, Collection of PFF, Nauplio)

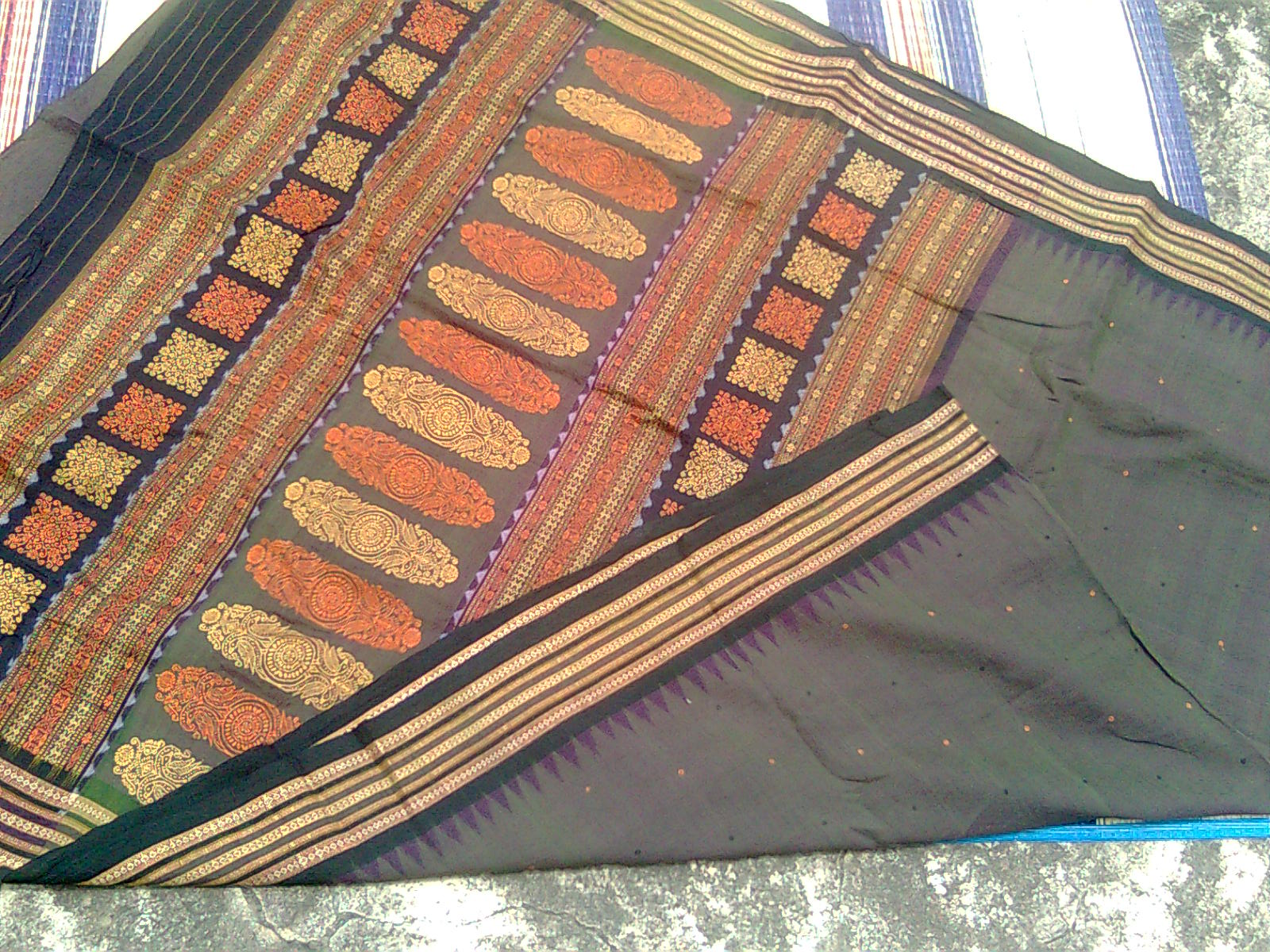
Bomkai silk sari of Odisha

- Tant sari – throughout Bangladesh and West Bengal
- Baluchari sari – Bishnupur, West Bengal
- Kaantha sari – throughout Bengal
- Garode / Korial – Murshidabad, West Bengal
- Shantipuri cotton – Shantipur, Phulia, West Bengal
- Jamdani / Dhakai – Dhaka, Bangladesh
- Murshidabad silk – Murshidabad, West Bengal
- Rajshahi silk / Eri – Rajshahi, Bangladesh
- Dhakai Katan – Dhaka, Bangladesh
- Georgette sari – Bangladesh
- Mooga silk – Assam
- Mekhla Cotton – Assam
- Sambalpuri silk & cotton sari – Sambalpur, Odisha
- Ikkat silk & cotton sari – Bargarh, Odisha
- Bomkai sari – Bomkai, Ganjam, Odisha
- Khandua Silk & Cotton sari – Nuapatna, Cuttack, Odisha
- Pasapali sari – Bargarh, Odisha
- Sonepuri Silk & Cotton sari – Subarnapur, Odisha
- Berhampuri silk – Behrampur, Odisha
- Mattha Silk sari – Mayurbhanj, Odisha
- Bapta Silk & Cotton sari – Koraput, Odisha
- Kotpad Pata sari – Koraput, Odisha
- Tanta Cotton sari – Balasore, Odisha
- Manipuri Tant sari – Manipur
- Moirang Phi sari – Manipur
- Patt Silk sari – Assam
- Kotki sari – Orissa
- Kotpad sari – Orissa

=== Western styles ===
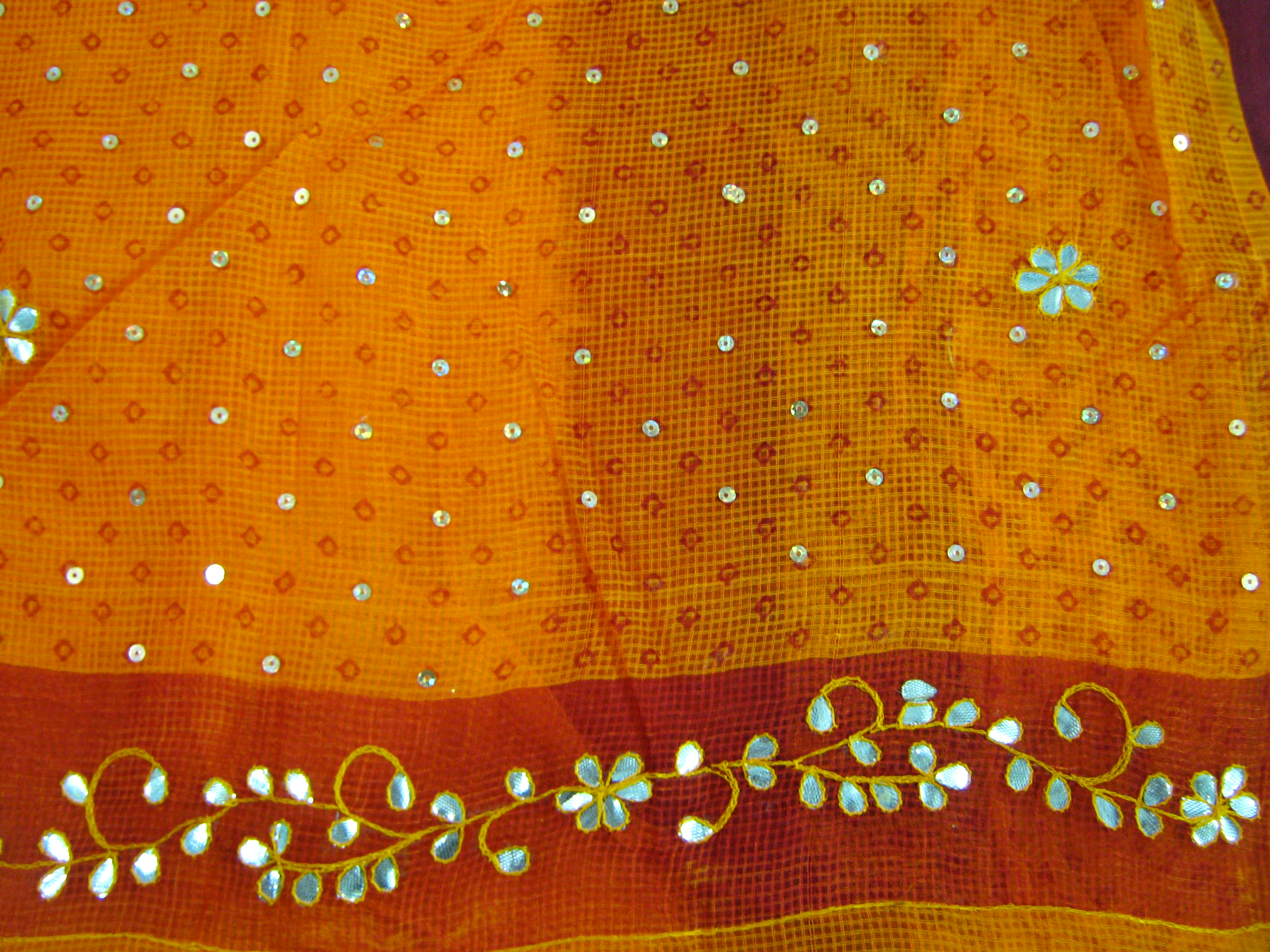
Kota sari

- Paithani – Maharashtra
- Yeola sari – Maharashtra
- Peshwai shalu – Maharashtra
- Mahalsa sari – Maharashtra
- Narayanpeth – Maharashtra
- Khun fabric – Maharashtra
- Karvati tussar sari – Maharashtra

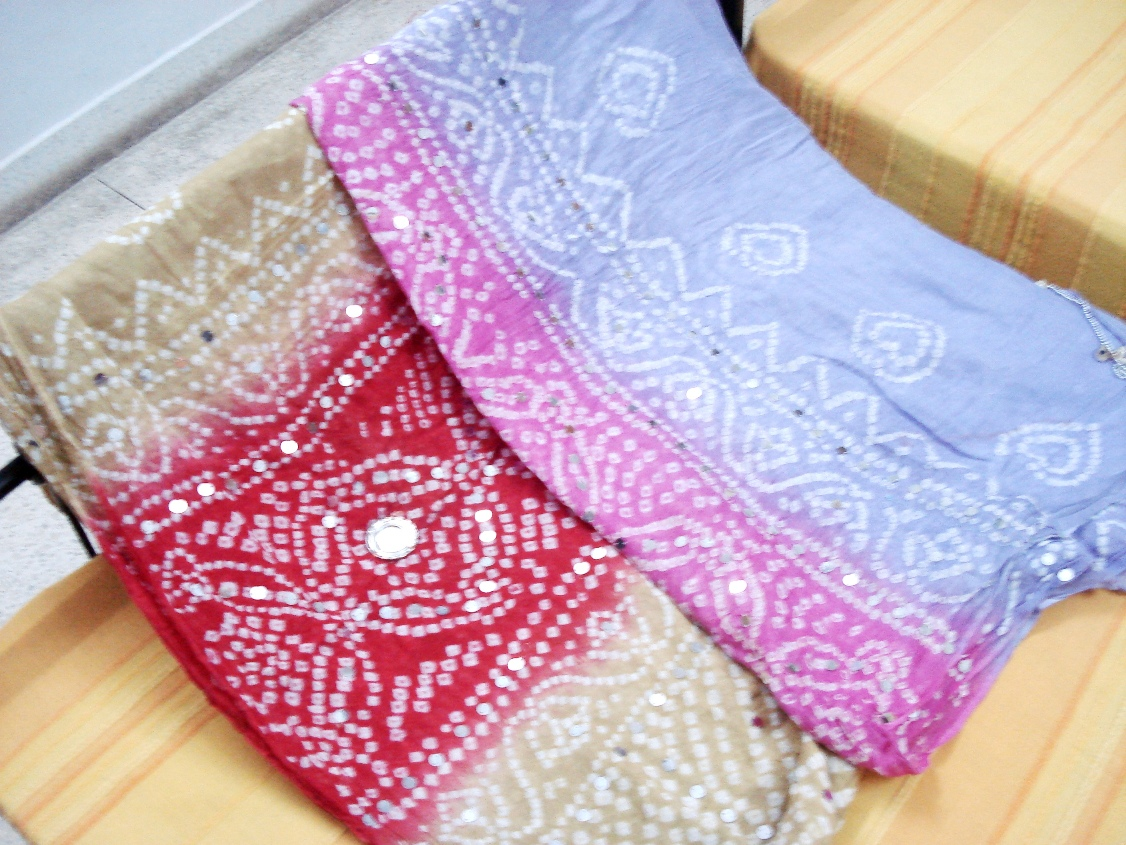
Bandhani saris of Gujarat and Rajasthan

- Bandhani – Gujarat, Rajasthan, Pakistan, Sindh
- Kota doria – Rajasthan, Pakistan, Sindh
- Lugade – Maharashtra
- Patola – Gujarat
- Rogan sari - Gujarat
- Bhujodi sari - Gujarat
- Bagru – Rajasthan.
- Phulkari – Punjab.
- Ajrak – Sindh, Rajasthan, Gujarat
- Bhujodi sari – Gujarat

=== Southern styles ===
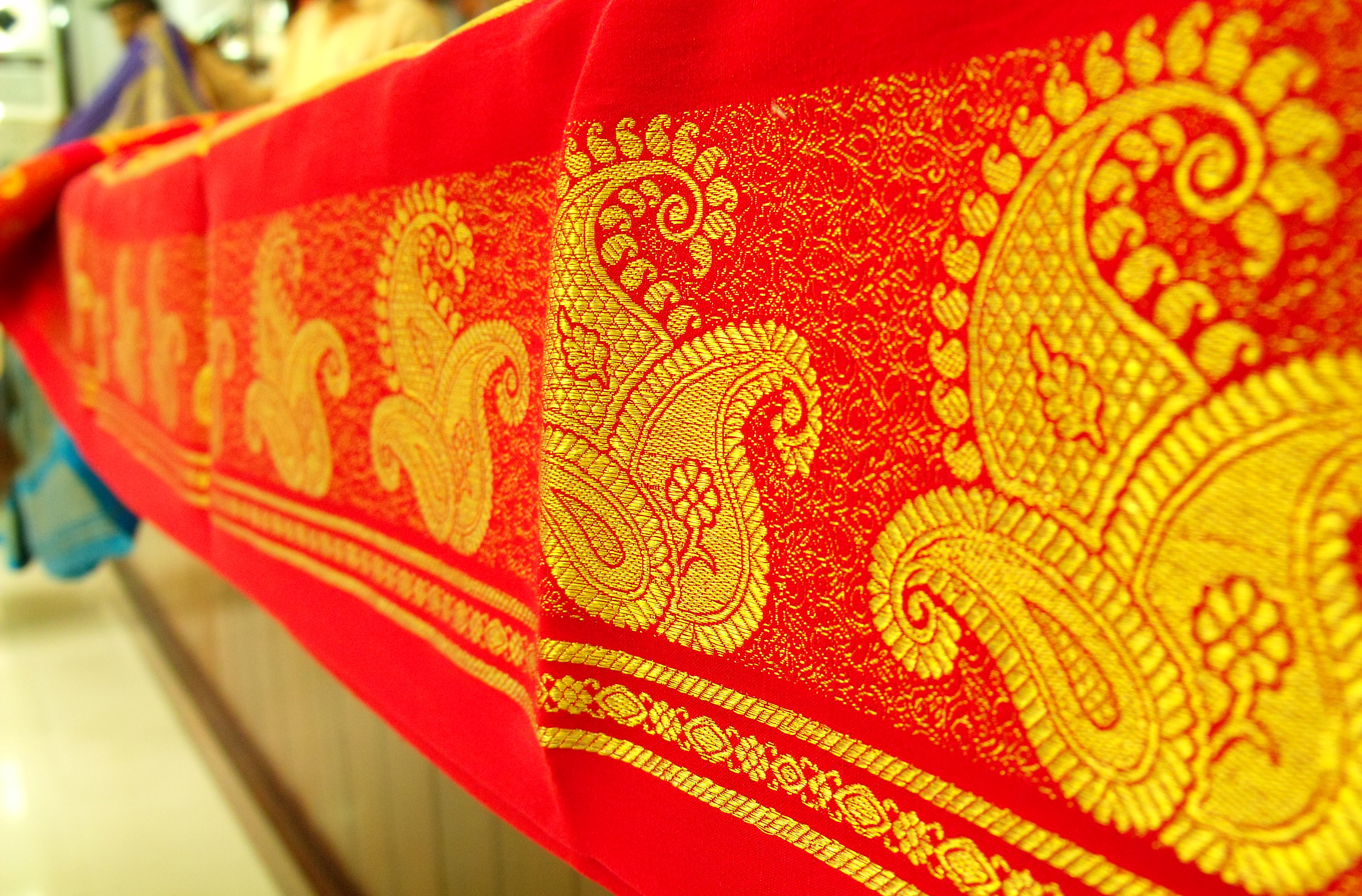
Mysore silk sari with golden zari

- Mysore silk – Karnataka
- Kanchipuram Silk (locally called Kanjipuram pattu) – Tamil Nadu
- Arani silk – Tamil Nadu
- Ilkal sari – Karnataka
- Molakalmuru sari – Karnataka
- Sulebhavi sari – Sulebhavi, Karnataka
- Venkatagiri – Andhra Pradesh
- Mangalagiri Silk saris – Andhra Pradesh
- Uppada Silk saris – Andhra Pradesh
- Chirala saris – Andhra Pradesh
- Bandar saris – Andhra Pradesh
- Bandarulanka – Andhra Pradesh
- Kuppadam saris – Andhra Pradesh
- Dharmavaram silk sari – Andhra Pradesh
- Chettinad saris – Tamil Nadu
- Thirubuvanam, Kumbakonam – Tamil Nadu
- Coimbatore cotton – Tamil Nadu
- Salem silk – Tamil Nadu
- Chinnalampattu or Sungudi – Tamil Nadu
- Kandangi saris – from Chettinad region in Tamil Nadu
- Madurai Sungudi saris - Tamil Nadu
- Rasipuram silk saris – Tamil Nadu
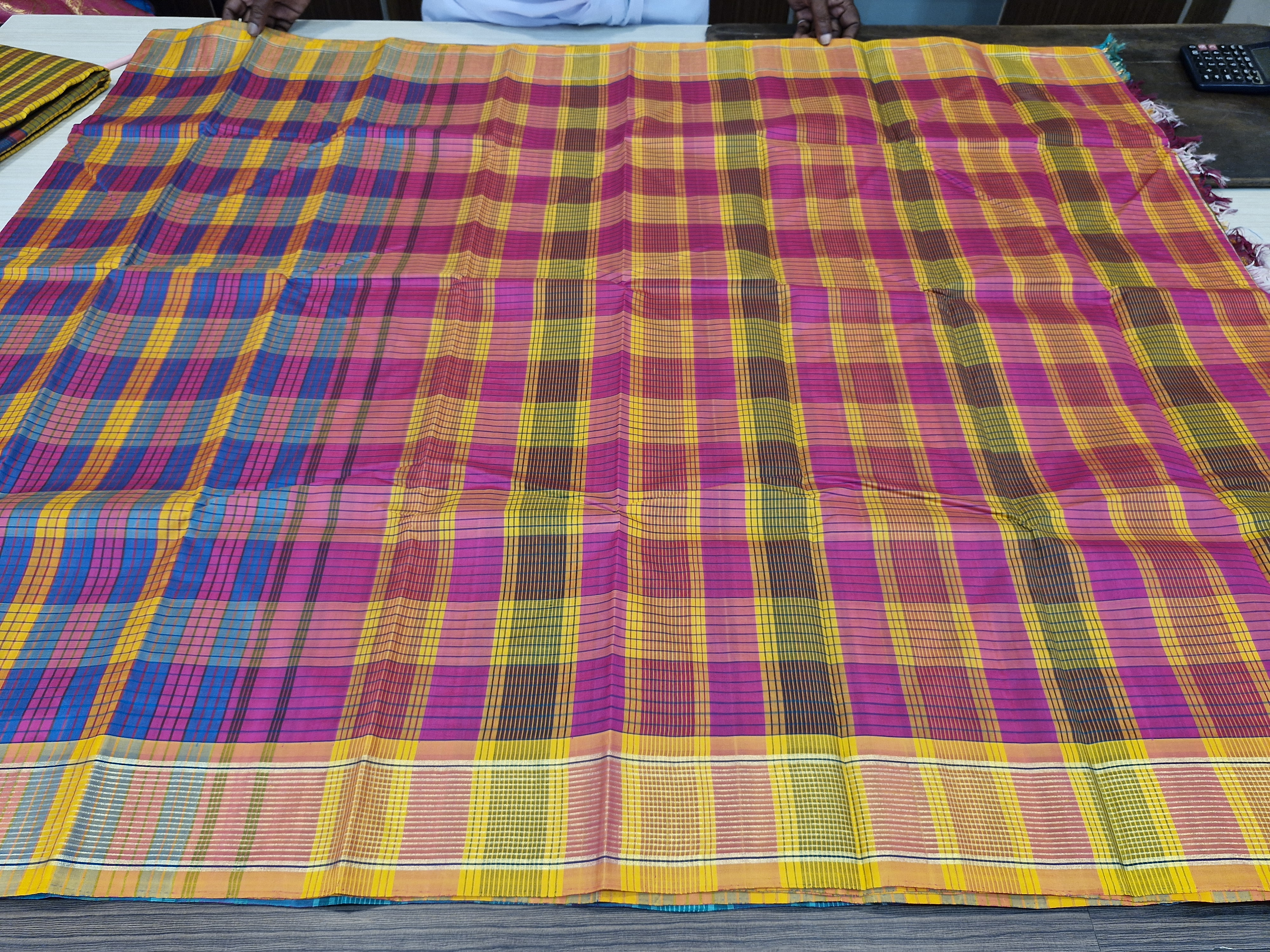
- Koorai silk sari Mayiladuthurai Tamil Nadu
  Koorai silk sari, Mayiladuthurai – Tamil Nadu
- Arni silk sari – Tamil Nadu
- Chennai – Tamil Nadu
- Karaikudi – Tamil Nadu
- Madurai cotton saris – Tamil Nadu
- Tiruchirappalli saris – Tamil Nadu
- Nagercoil saris – Tamil Nadu
- Thoothukudi – Tamil Nadu
- Thanjavur saris – Tamil Nadu
- Tiruppur – Tamil Nadu
- Kerala sari silk and cotton – Kerala
- Balarampuram – Kerala
- Mundum Neriyathum – Kerala
- Mayilati silk – Kerala
- Kannur cotton – Kerala
- Kalpathi silk saris – Kerala
- Maradaka silk – Kerala
- Samudrikapuram silk and cotton – Kerala
- Kasargod – Kerala
- Pochampally sari or Puttapaka sari – Telangana
- Gadwal sari – Telangana
- Narayanpet – Telangana

== Images ==
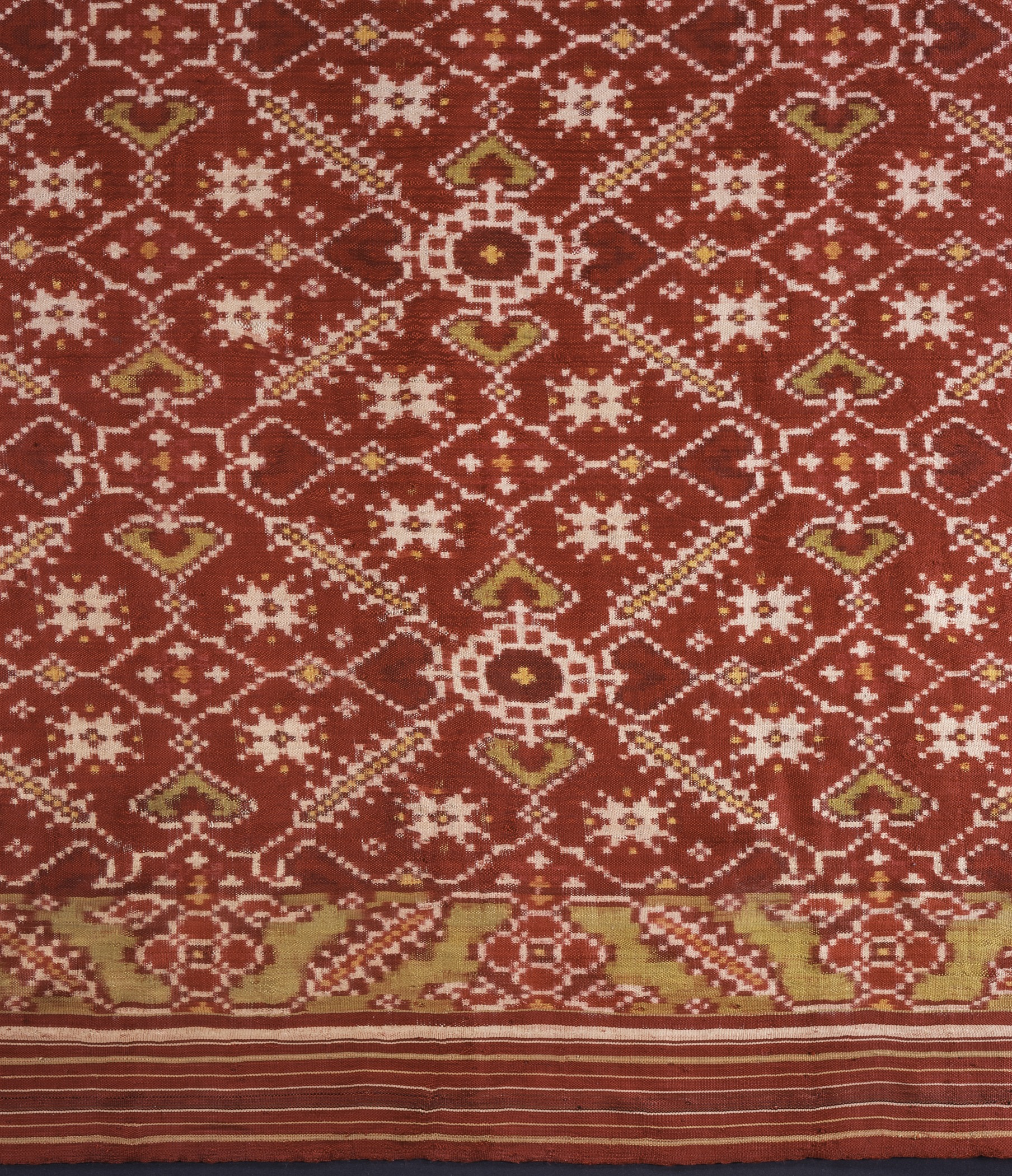
19th century example of weft-resist dye (patola) or double Ikat

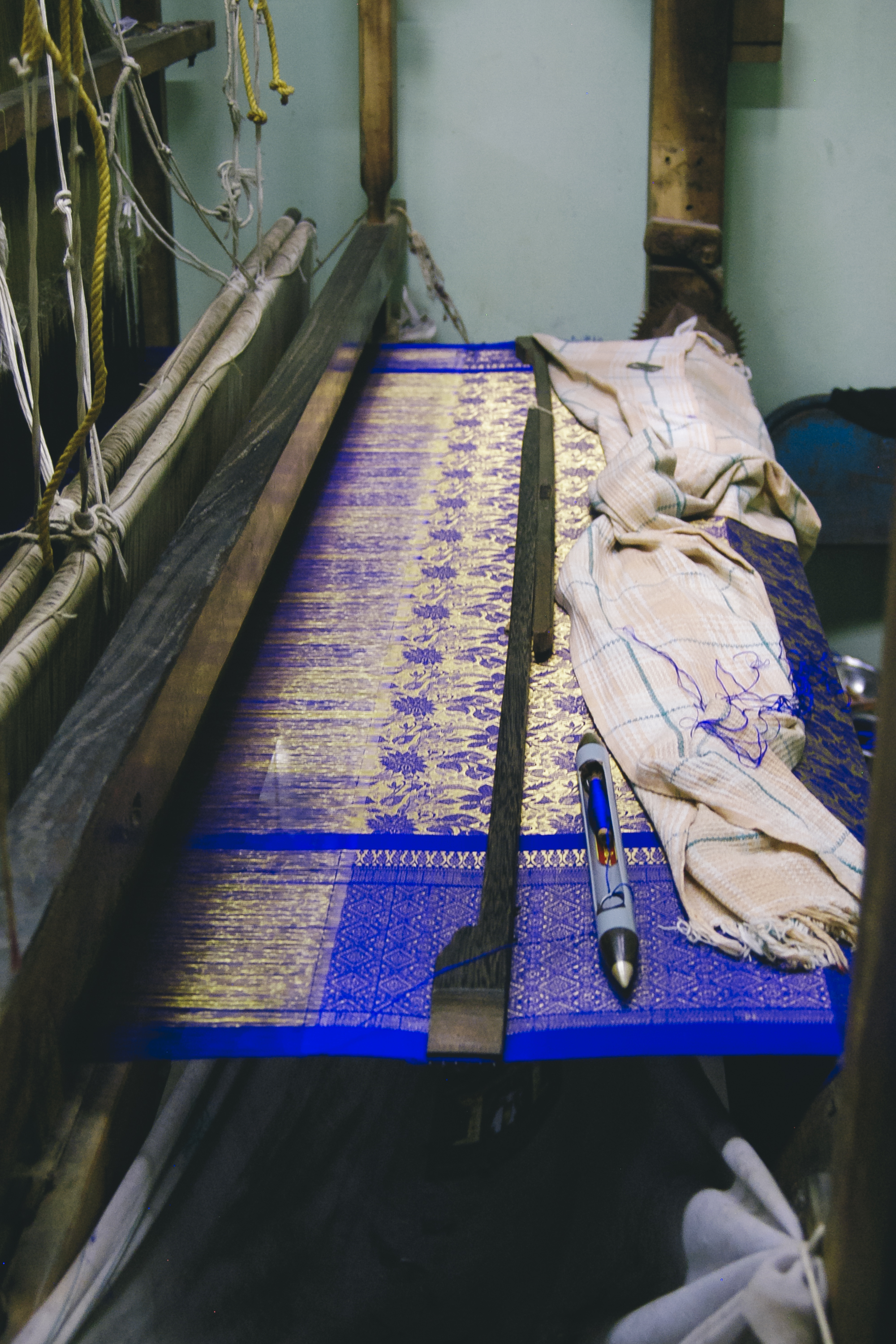
A silk sari loom in Kumbakonam, Tamil Nadu

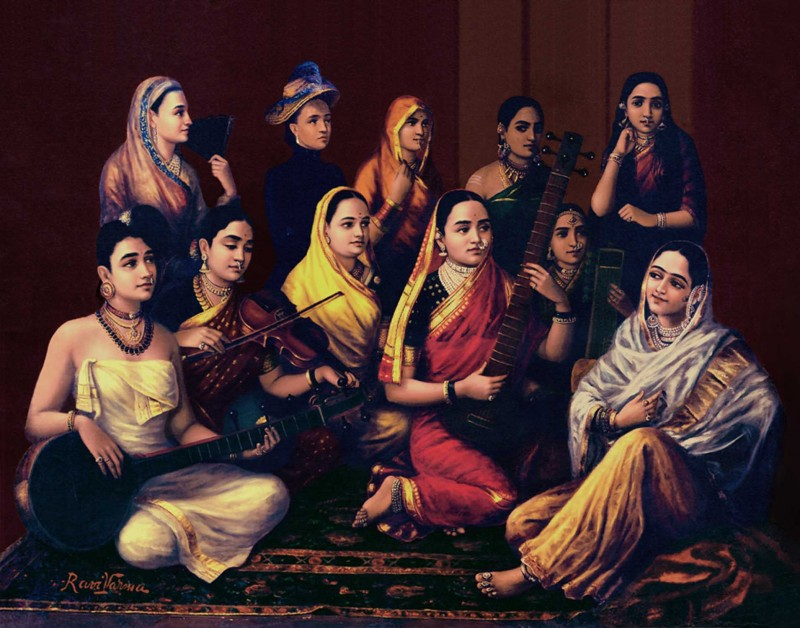
Galaxy of Musicians by Raja Ravi Varma depicting women in various styles of sari

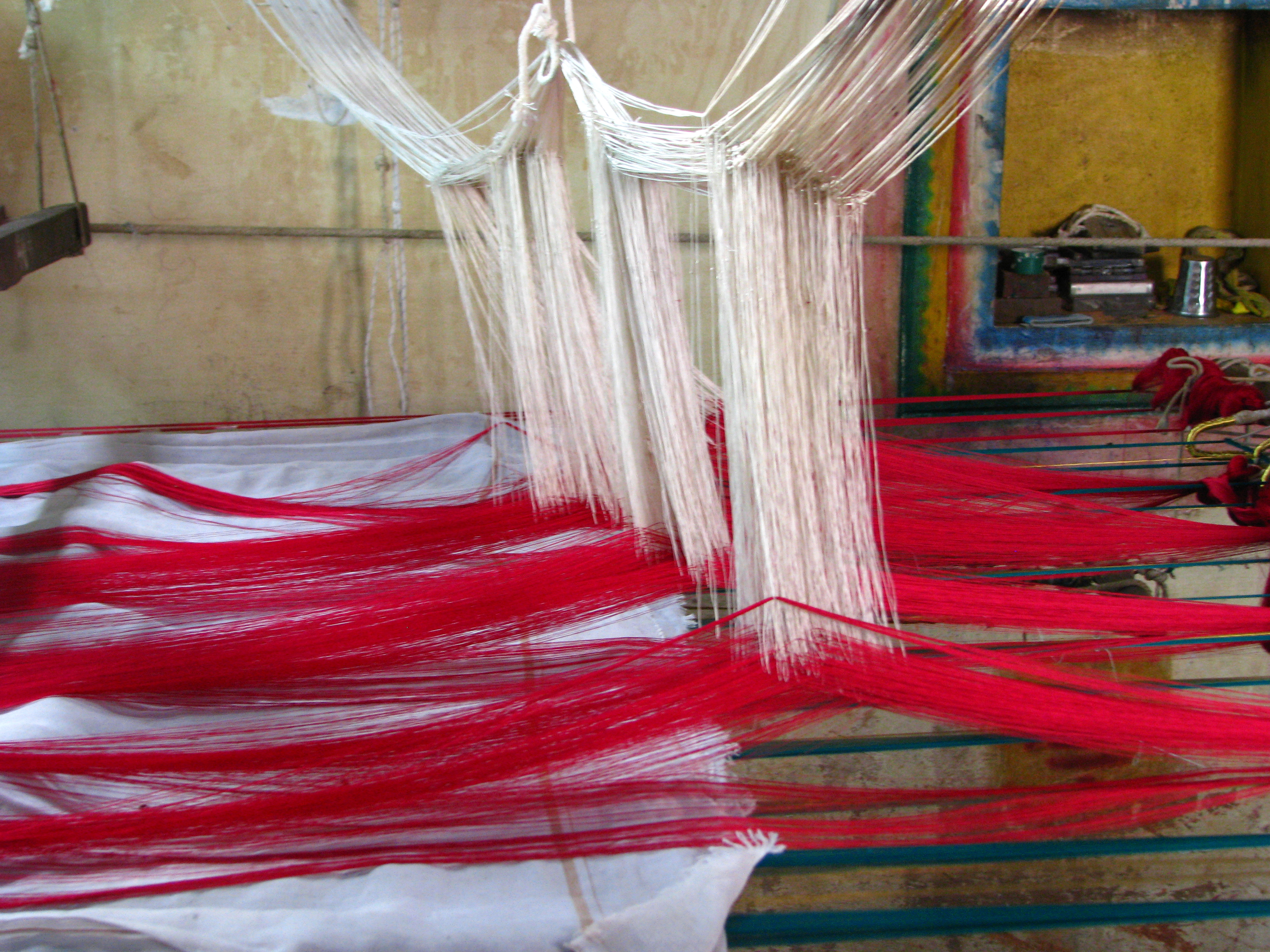
Silk weaving at Kanchipuram, Tamil Nadu

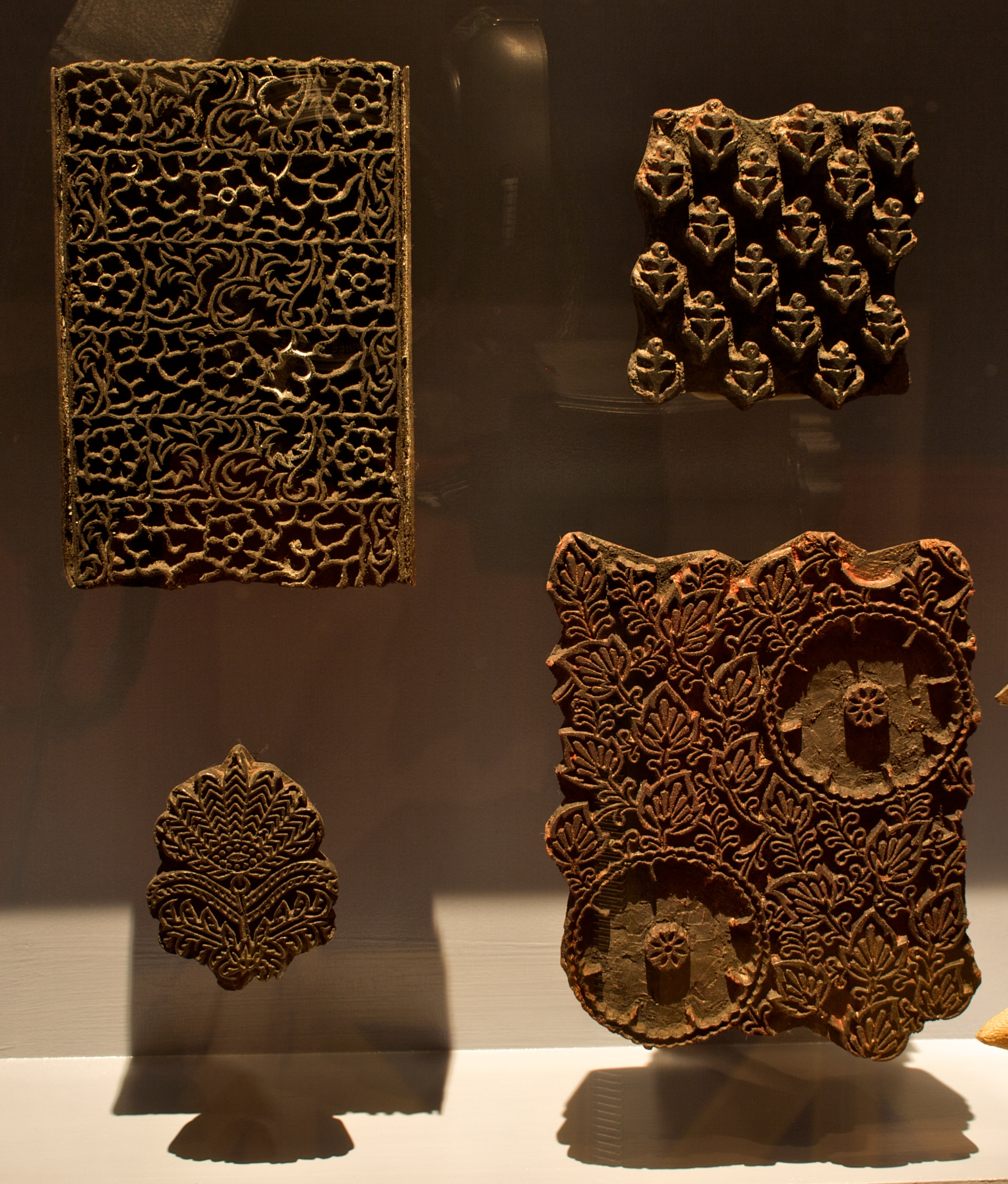
Wooden printing-blocks used for block-print saris

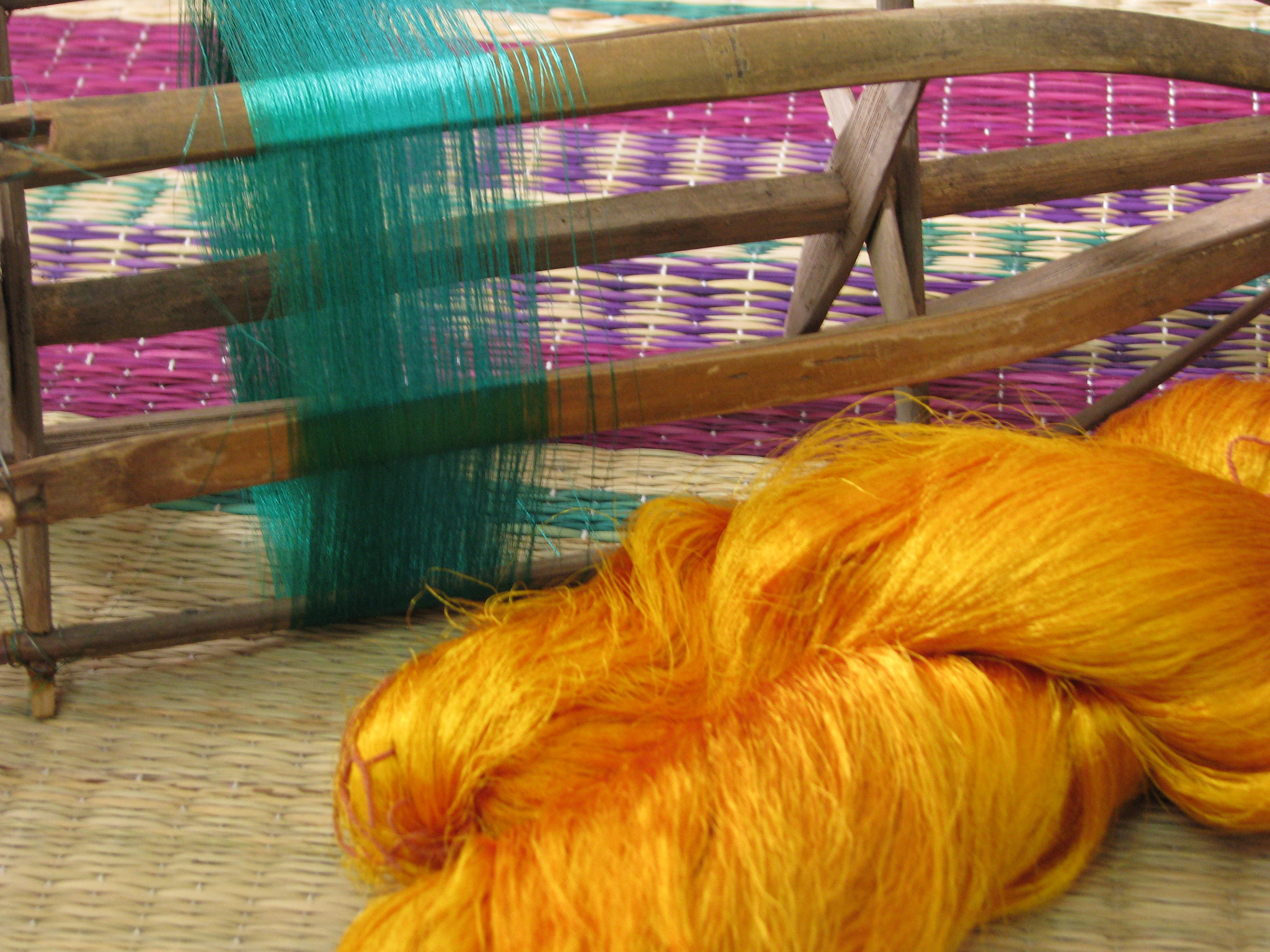
Dyed silk yarns for sari

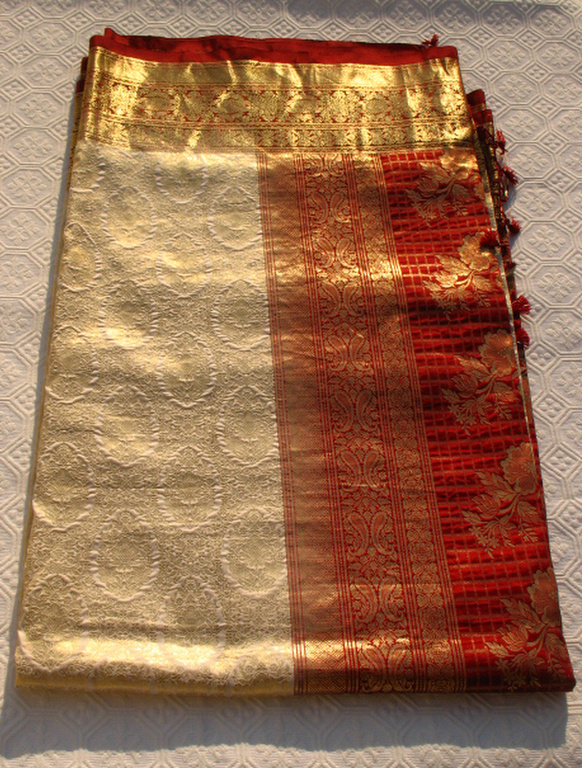
Handloom Kanchivaram silk sari

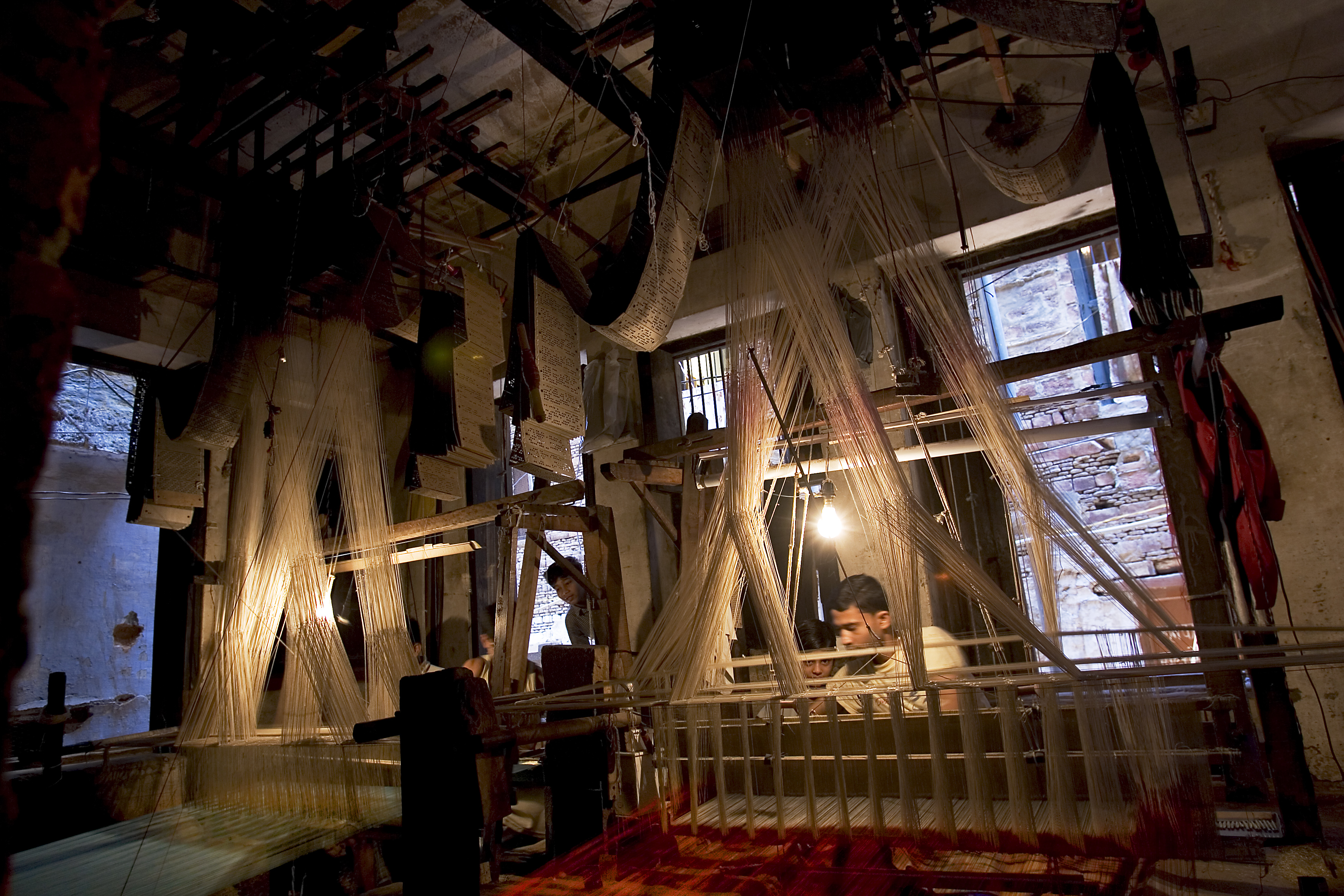
Handloom in Varanasi, Uttar Pradesh

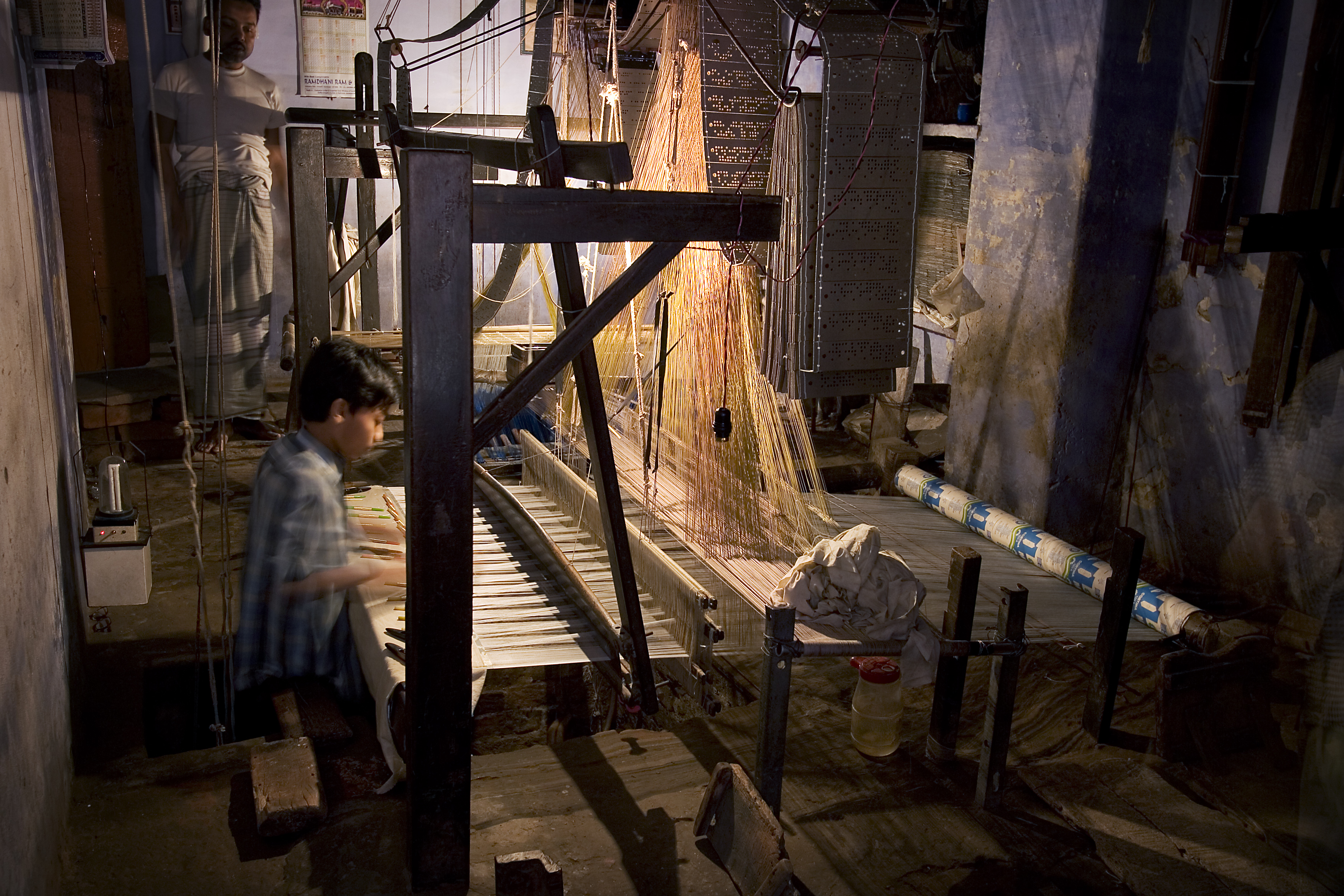
Handloom in Varanasi

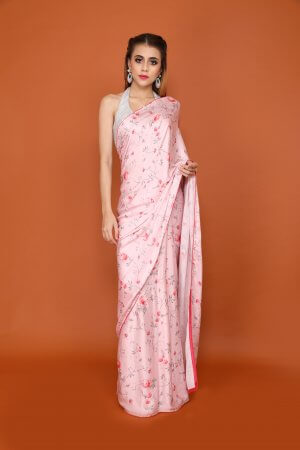
A classic drape sari

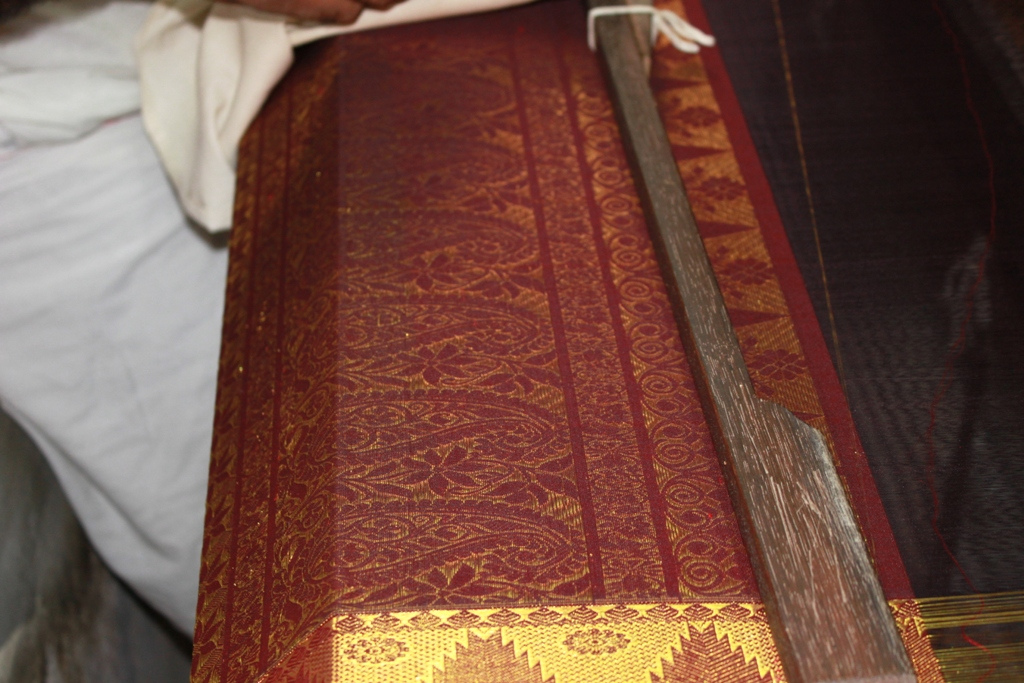
Weaving at work in Kanchipuram

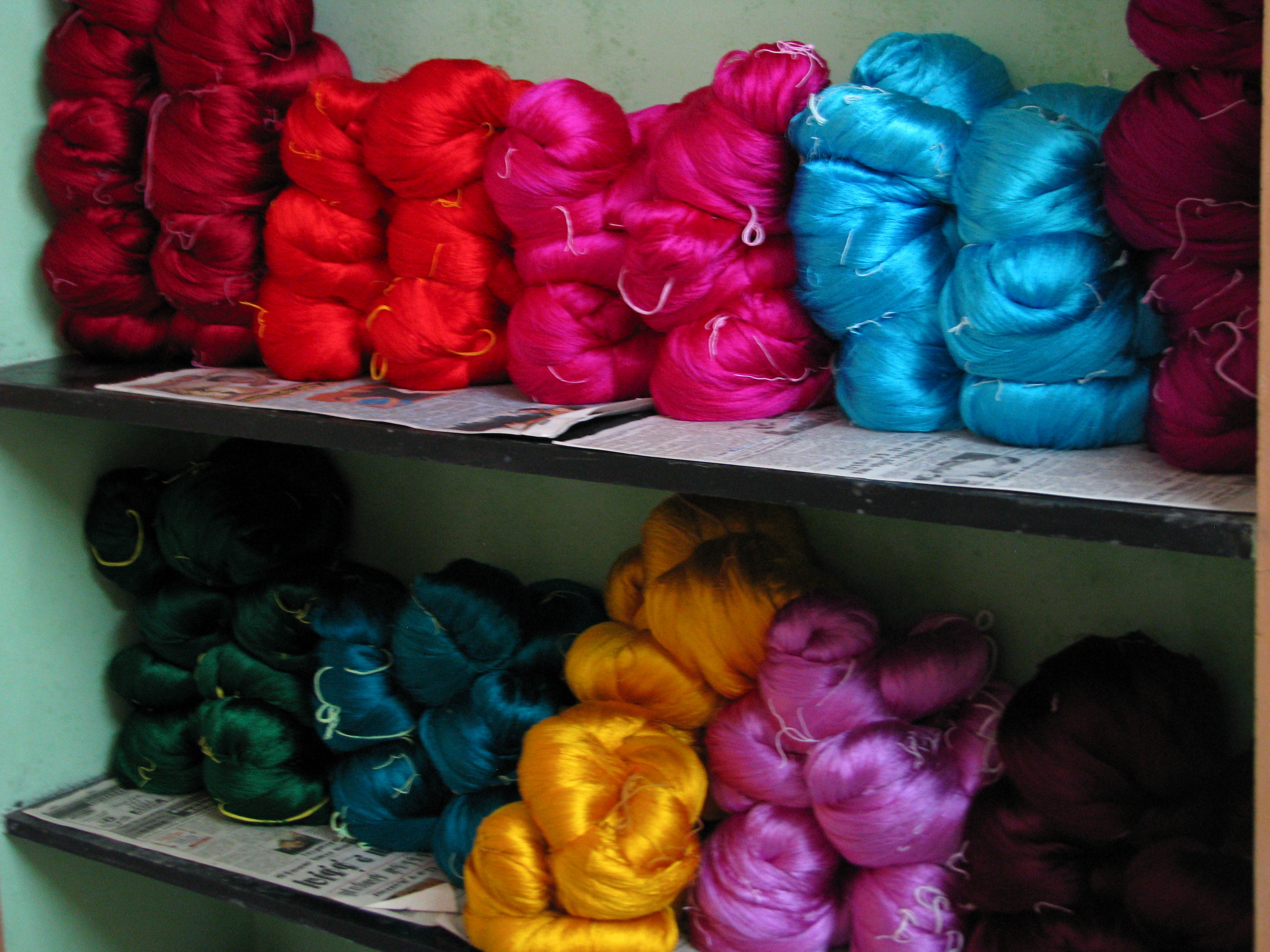
Dyed silk yarns for weaving saris

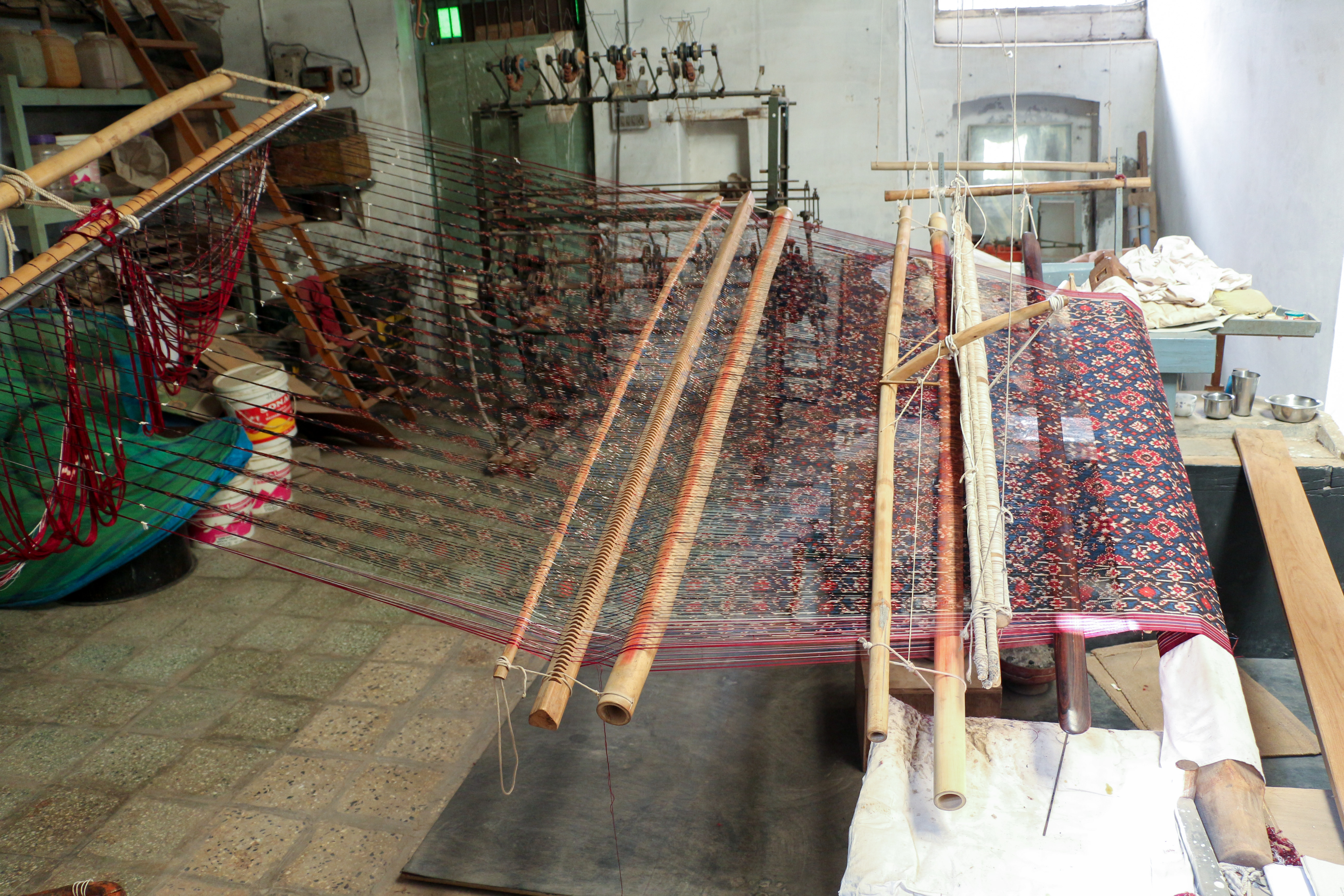
Double-Ikat handloom for Patola sari in Gujarat

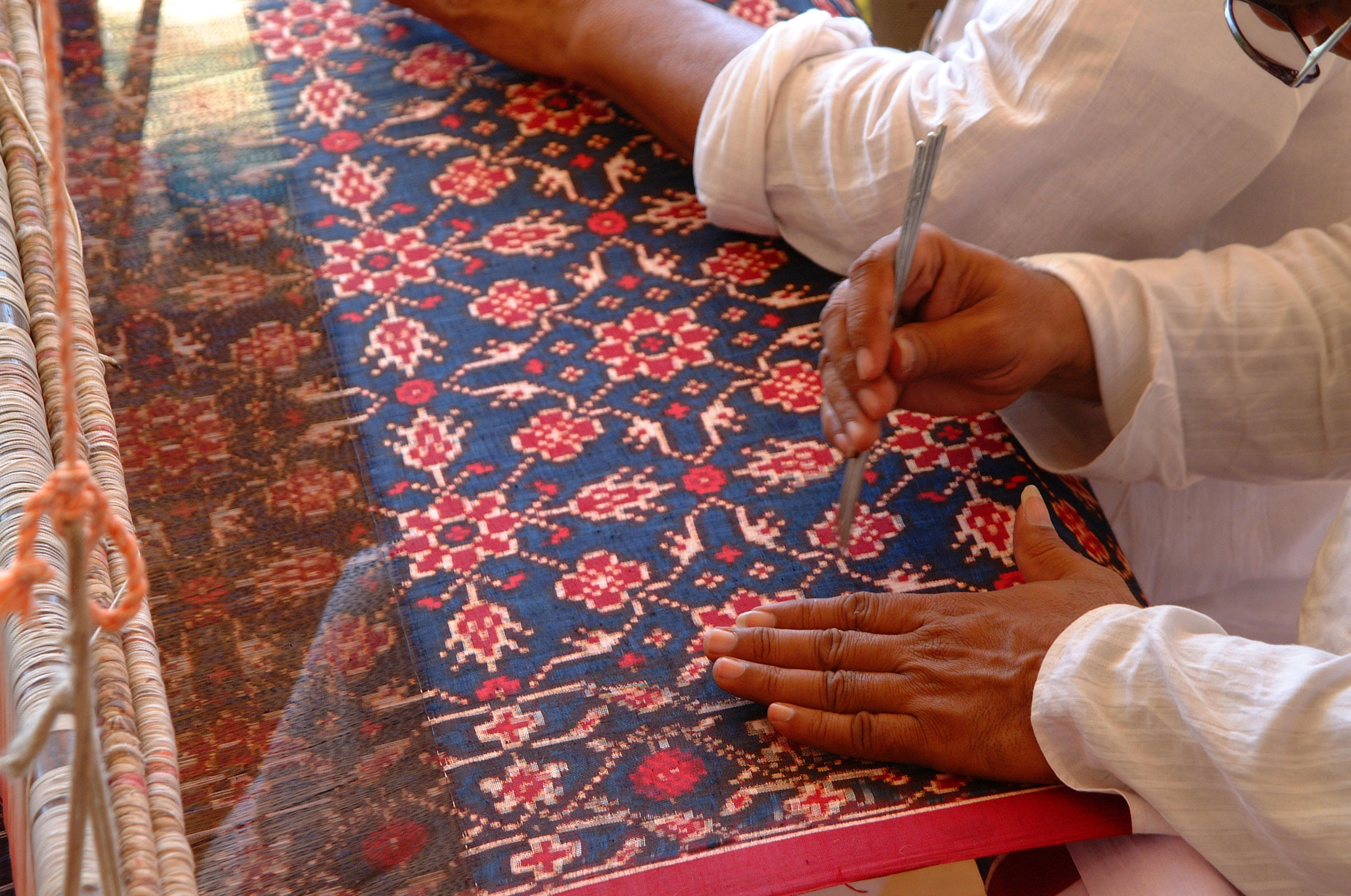
Double ikat (Patola) weaving

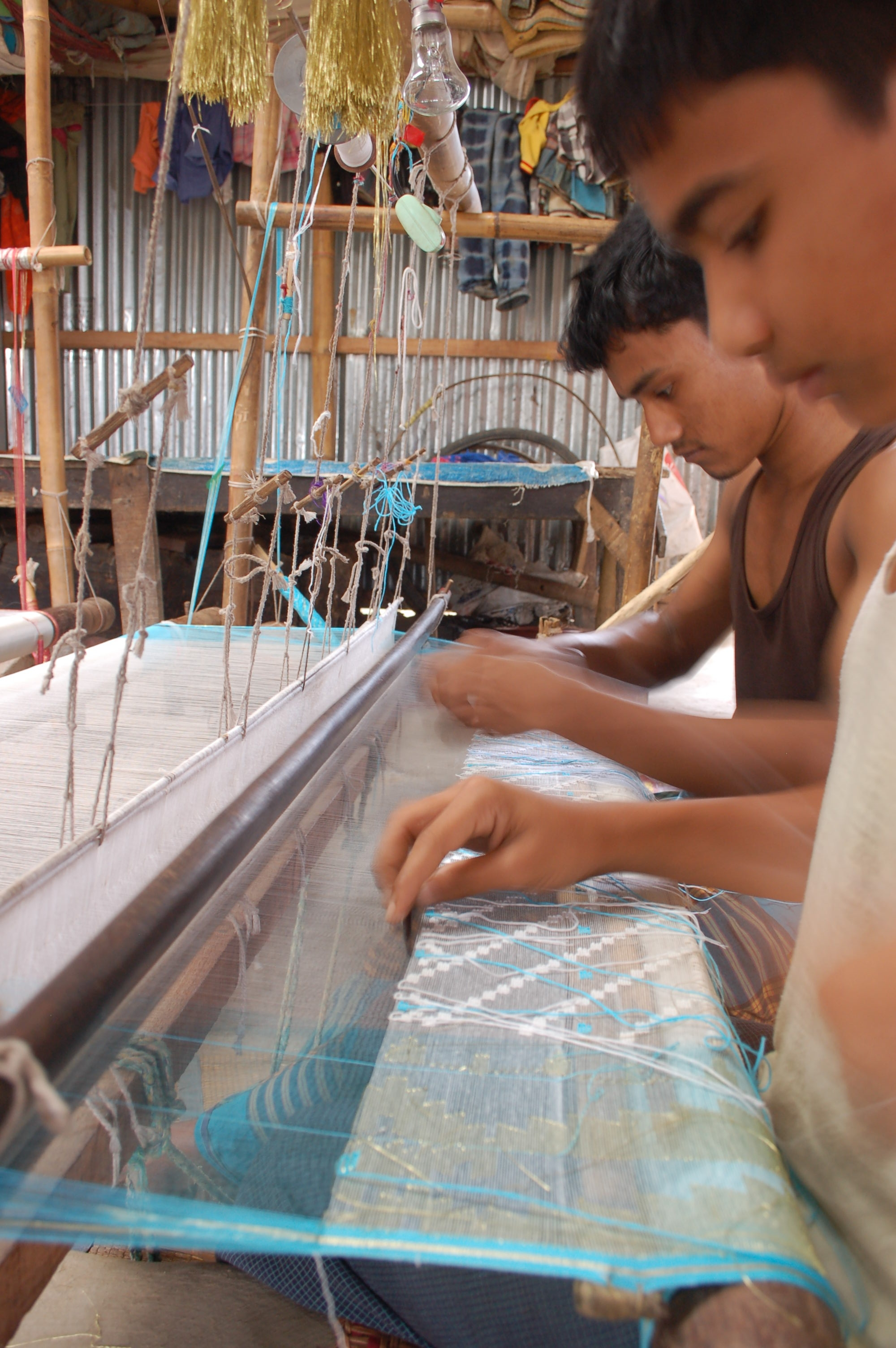
Weaving Jamdani sari in handloom, Bangladesh

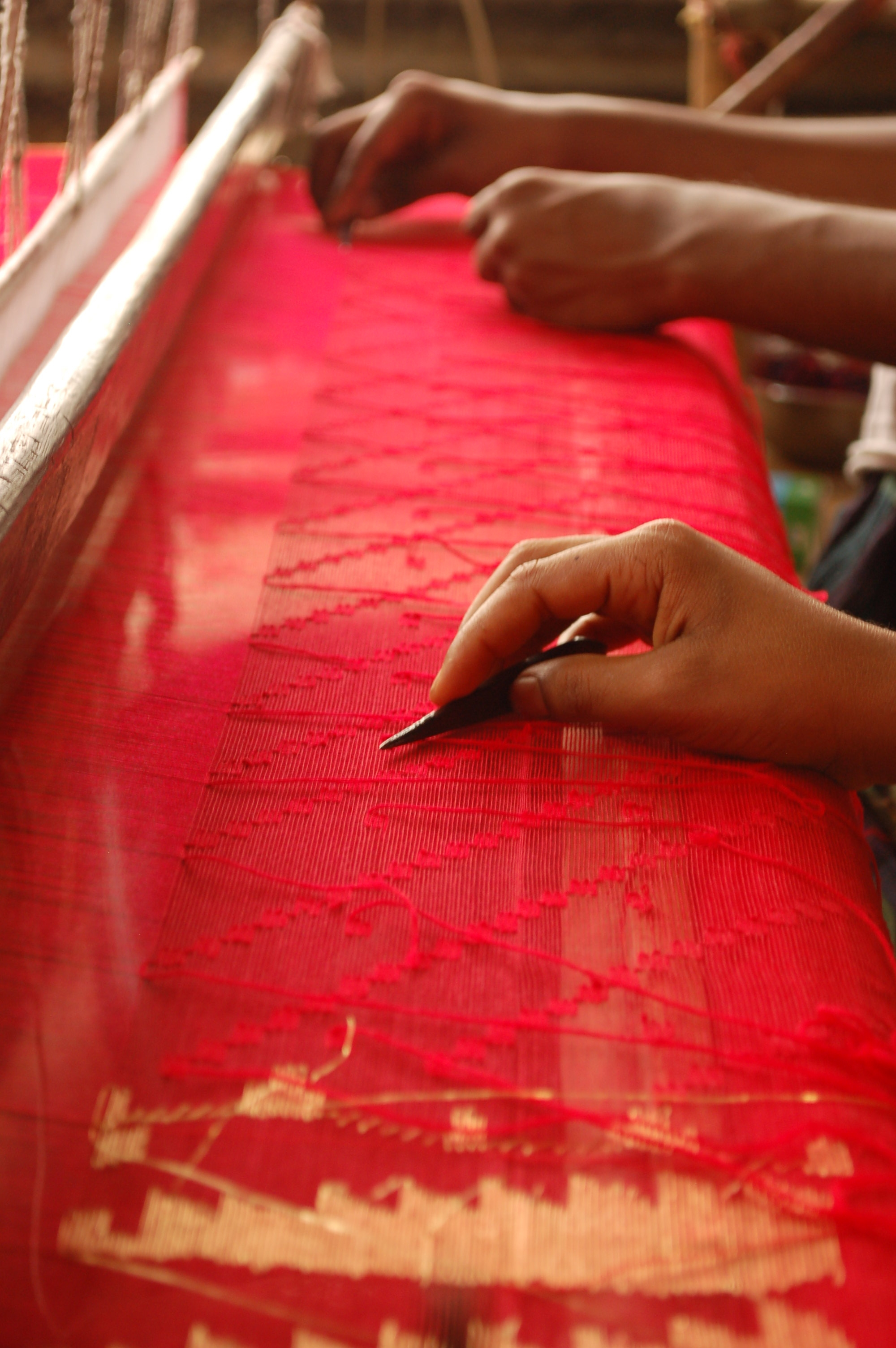
Weavers at work in Bangladesh

Child wearing sari in Bangladesh

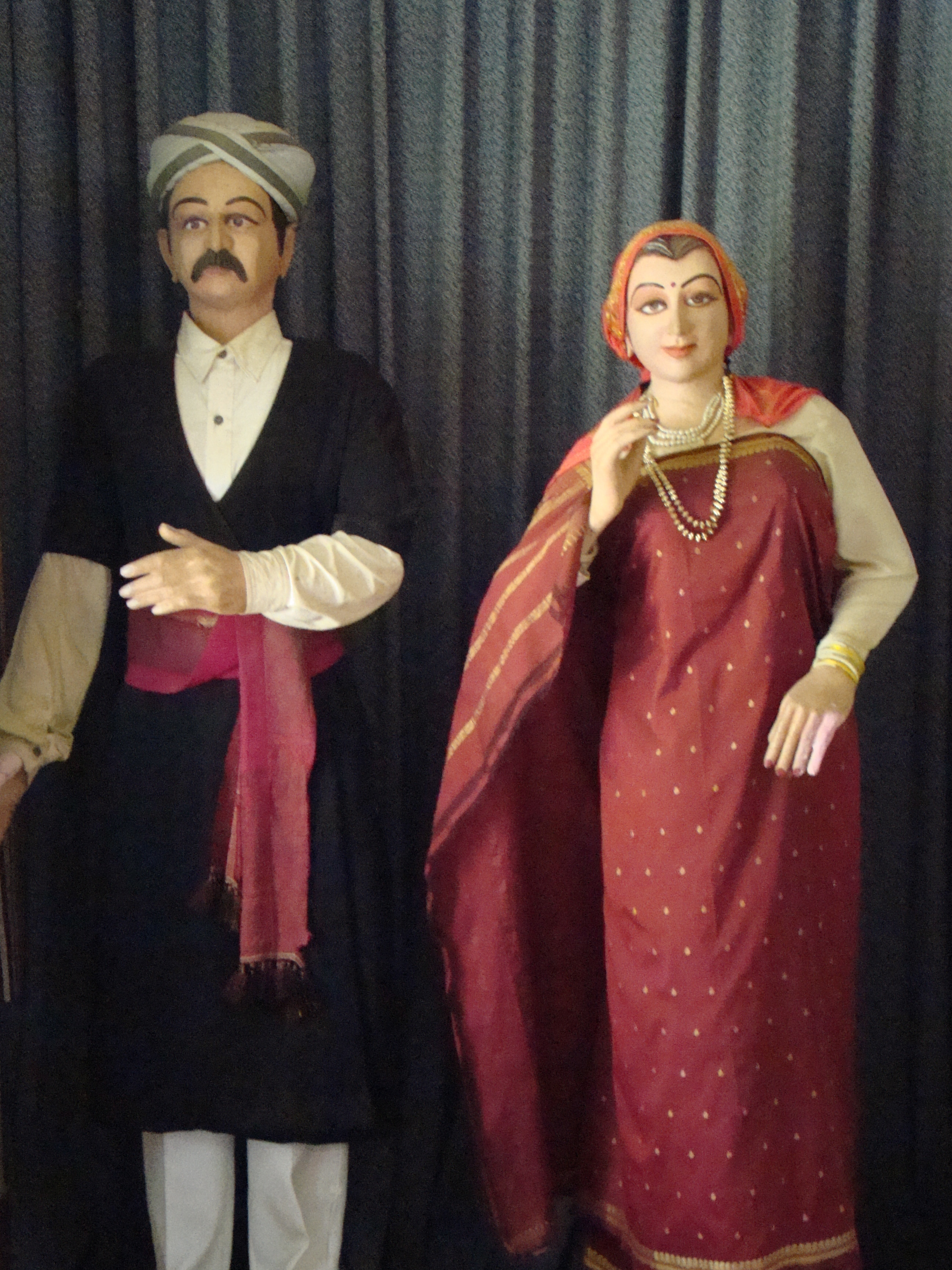
Style of sari worn in Coorg

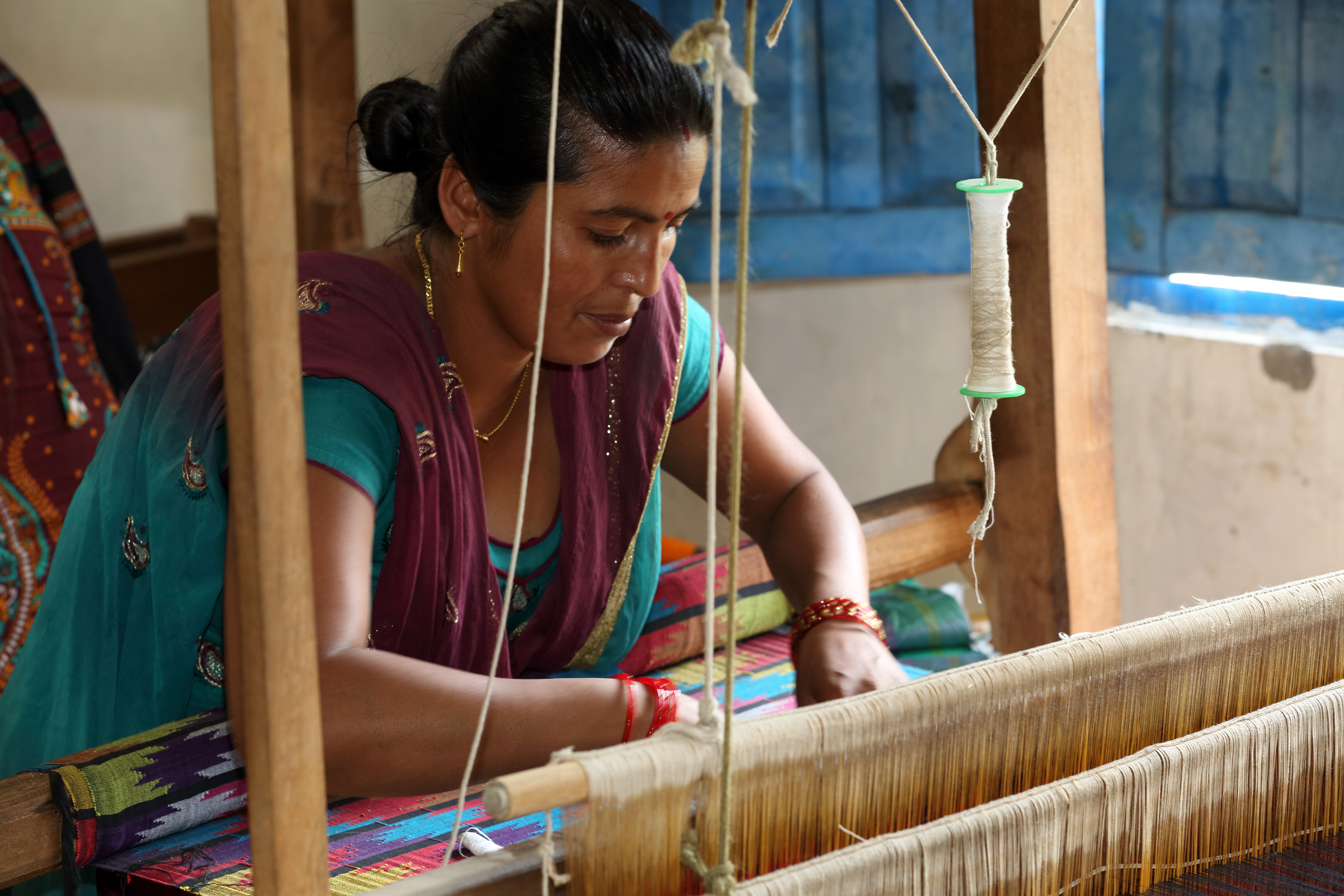
Handloom weaver at work

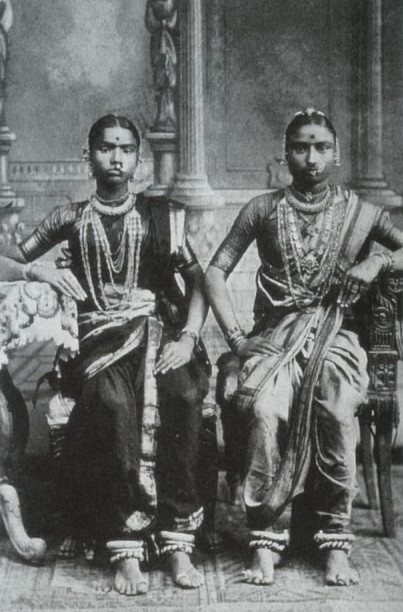
Devadasis from Goa

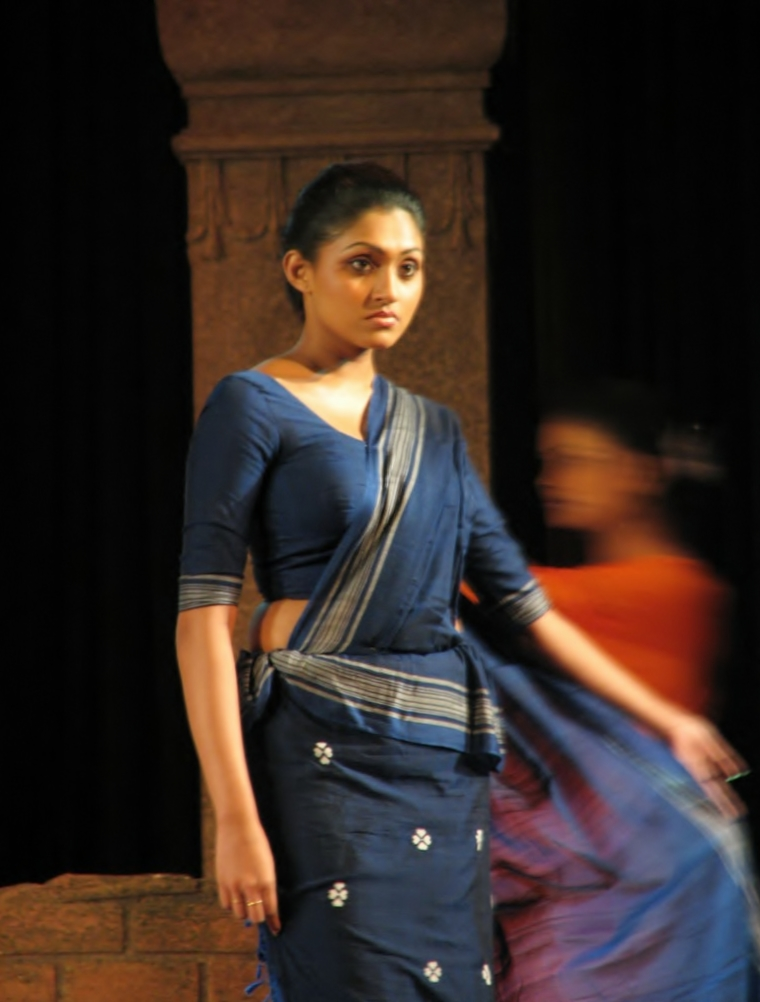
Sinhalese woman wearing a traditional Kandyan sari (osaria)

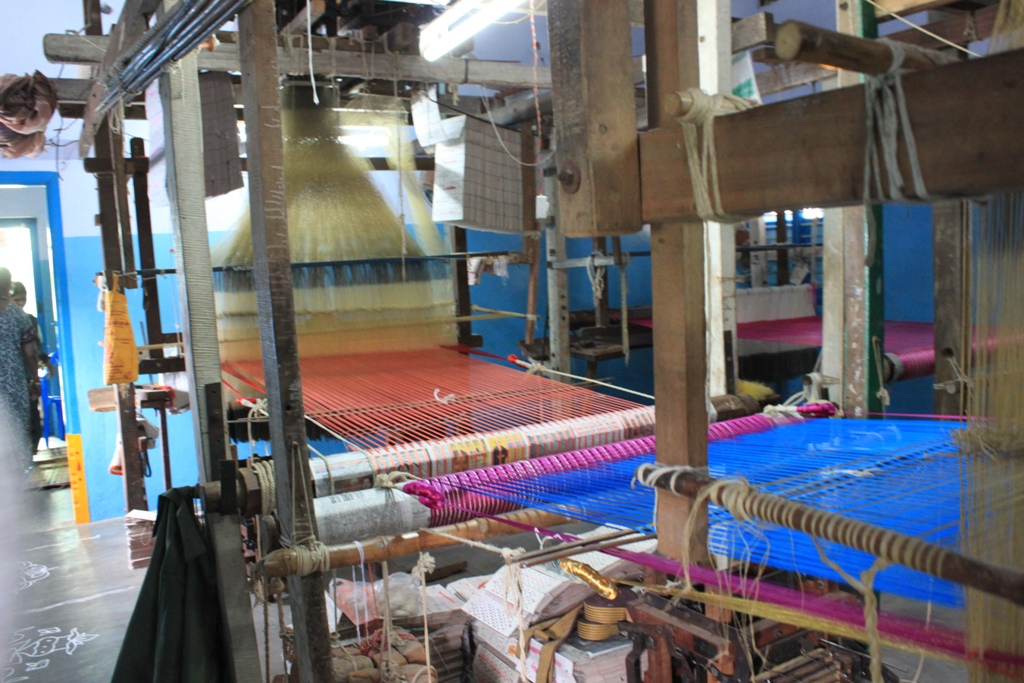
Weaving saris in Kancipuram

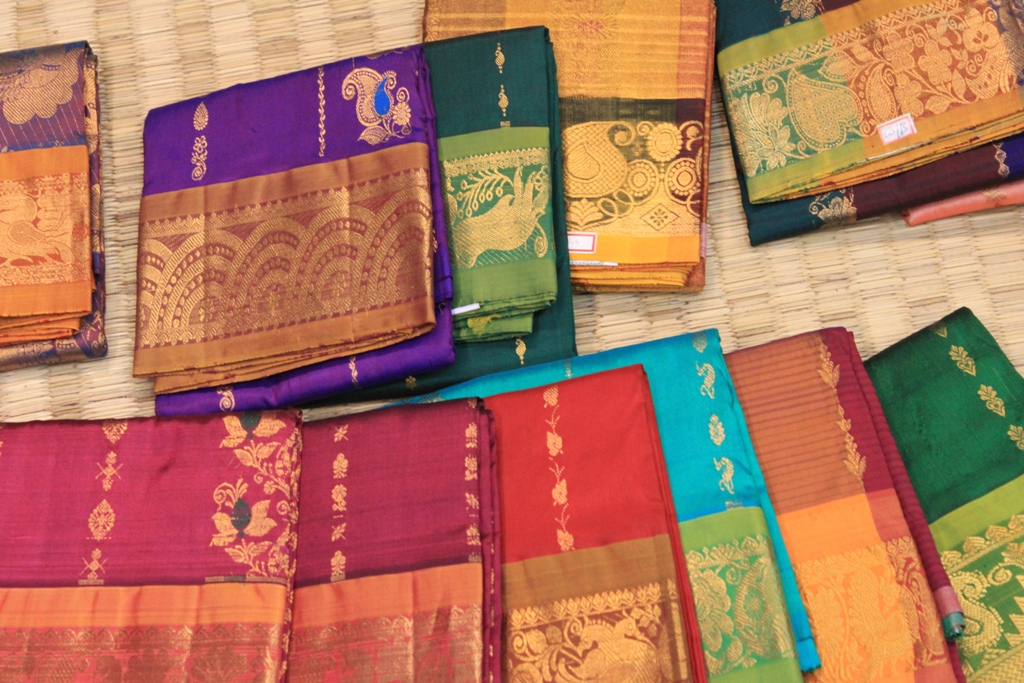
Display of handloom saris

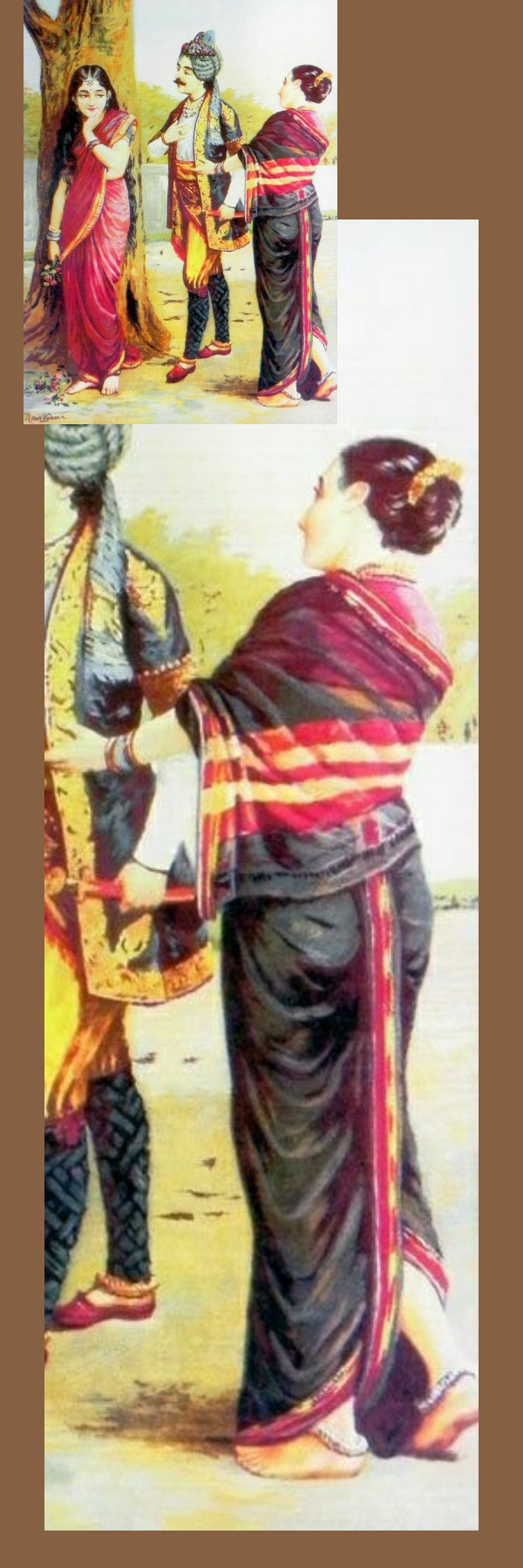
Picture shows sari draping style of North Karnataka by Raja Ravi Varma

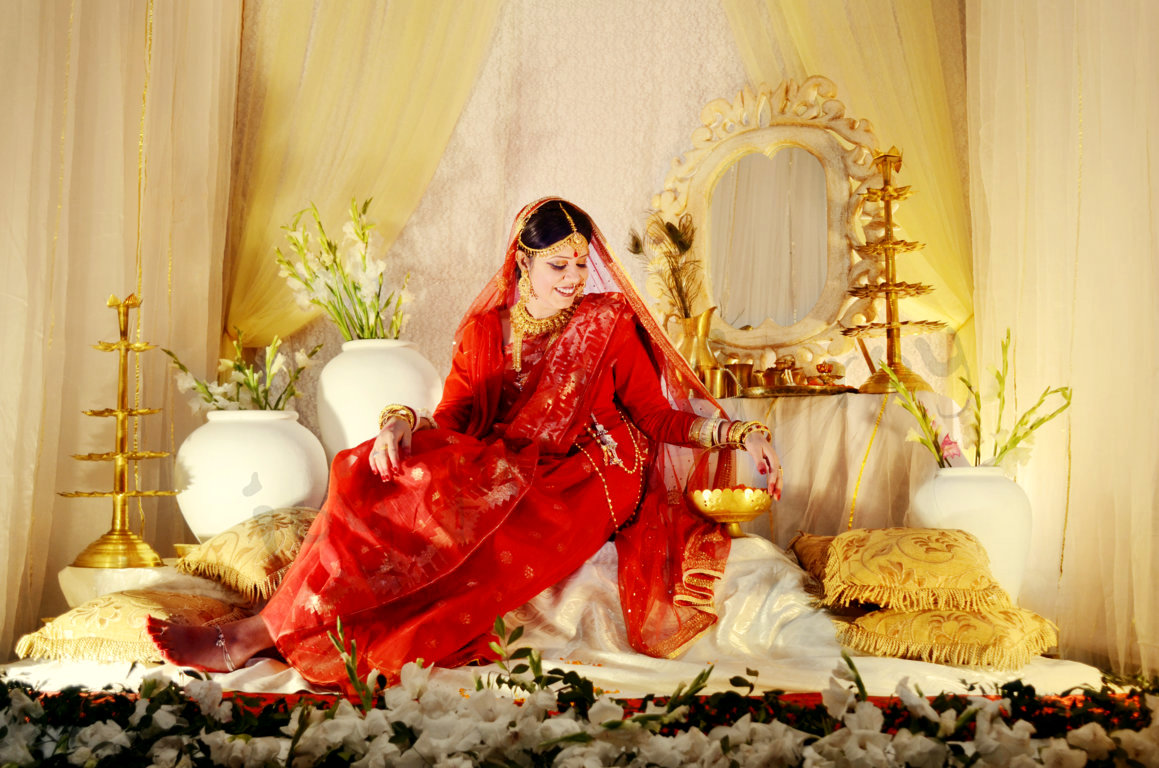
Bride in traditional Bengali sari

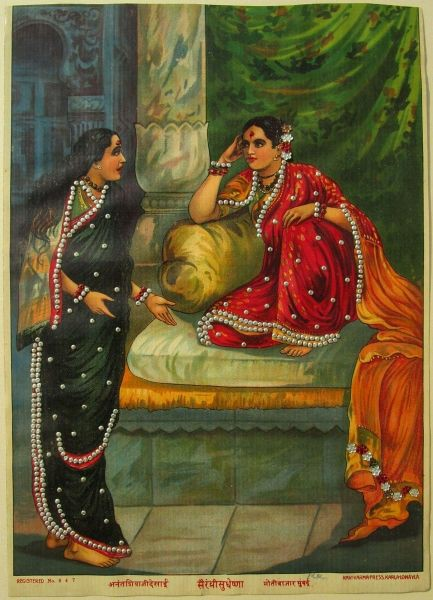
Woman in Karnataka kacche drape by Raja Ravi Varma

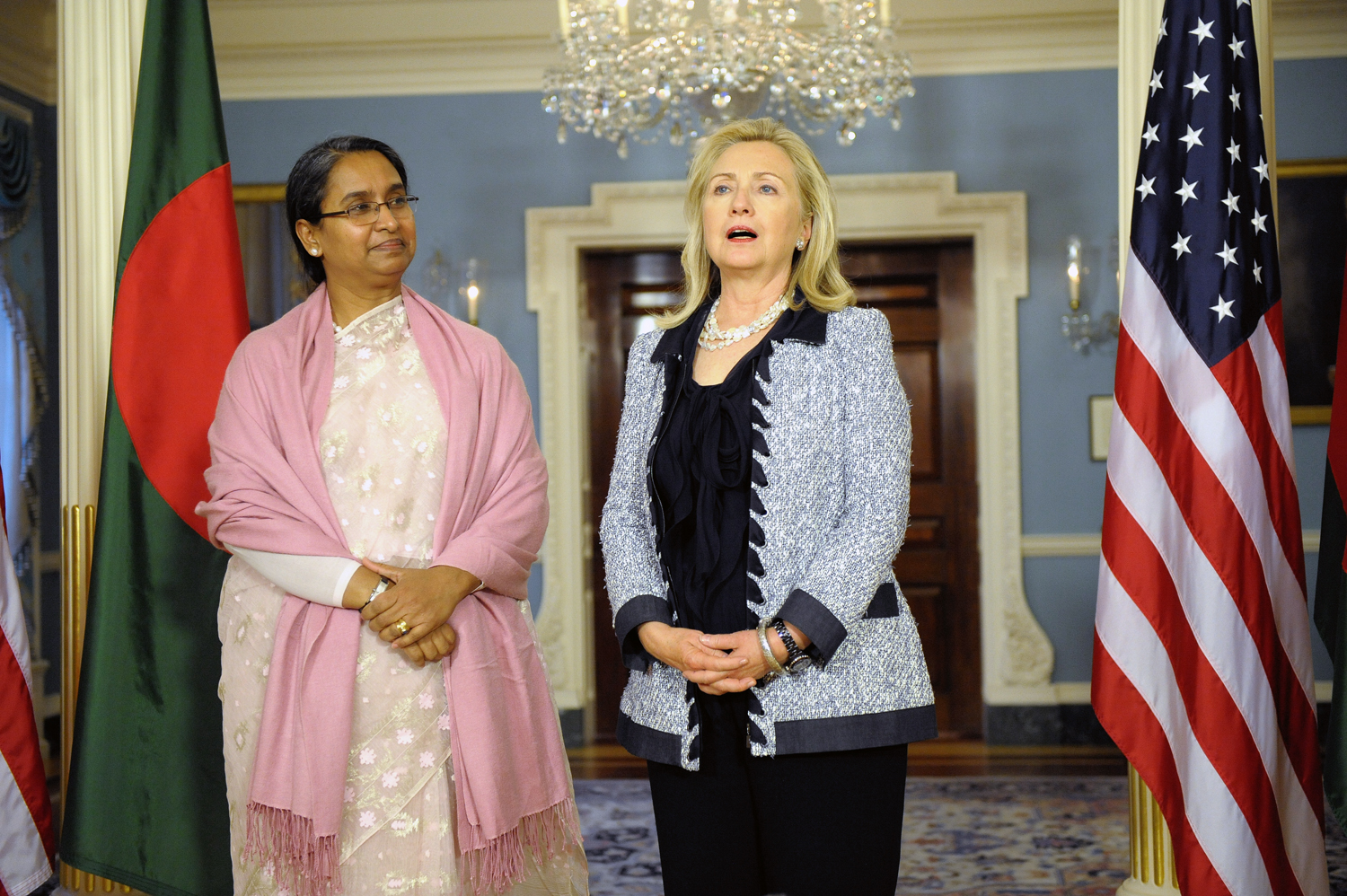
Education Minister of Bangladesh Dr.Dipu Moni wearing sari with Hillary Clinton

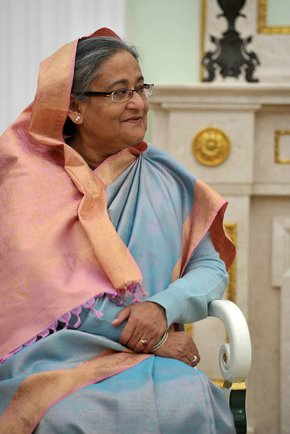
Bangladeshi Prime Minister Sheikh Hasina in a Rajshahi silk sari at the Moscow Kremlin

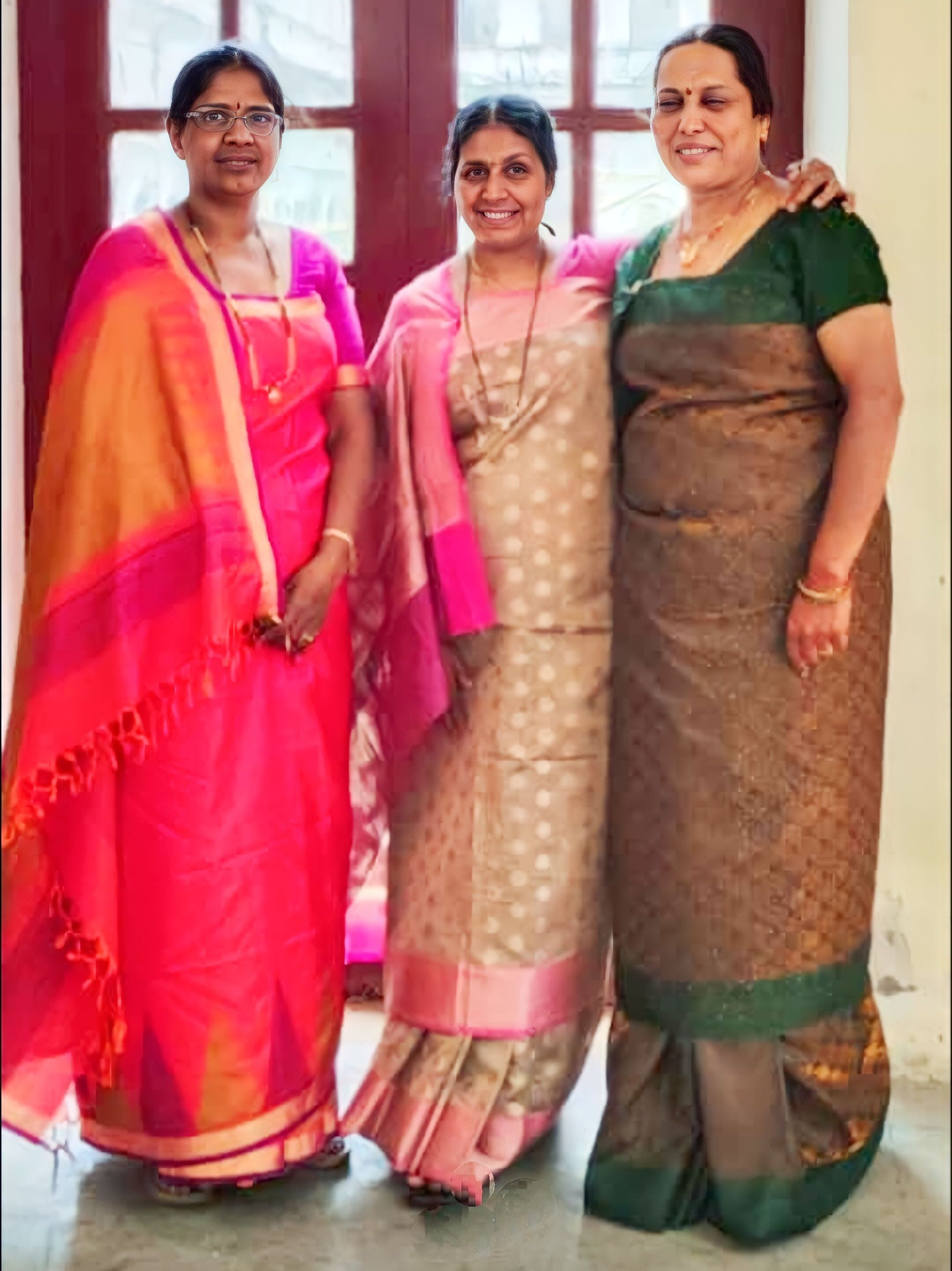
Women in Karnataka wearing Kodagu style sari

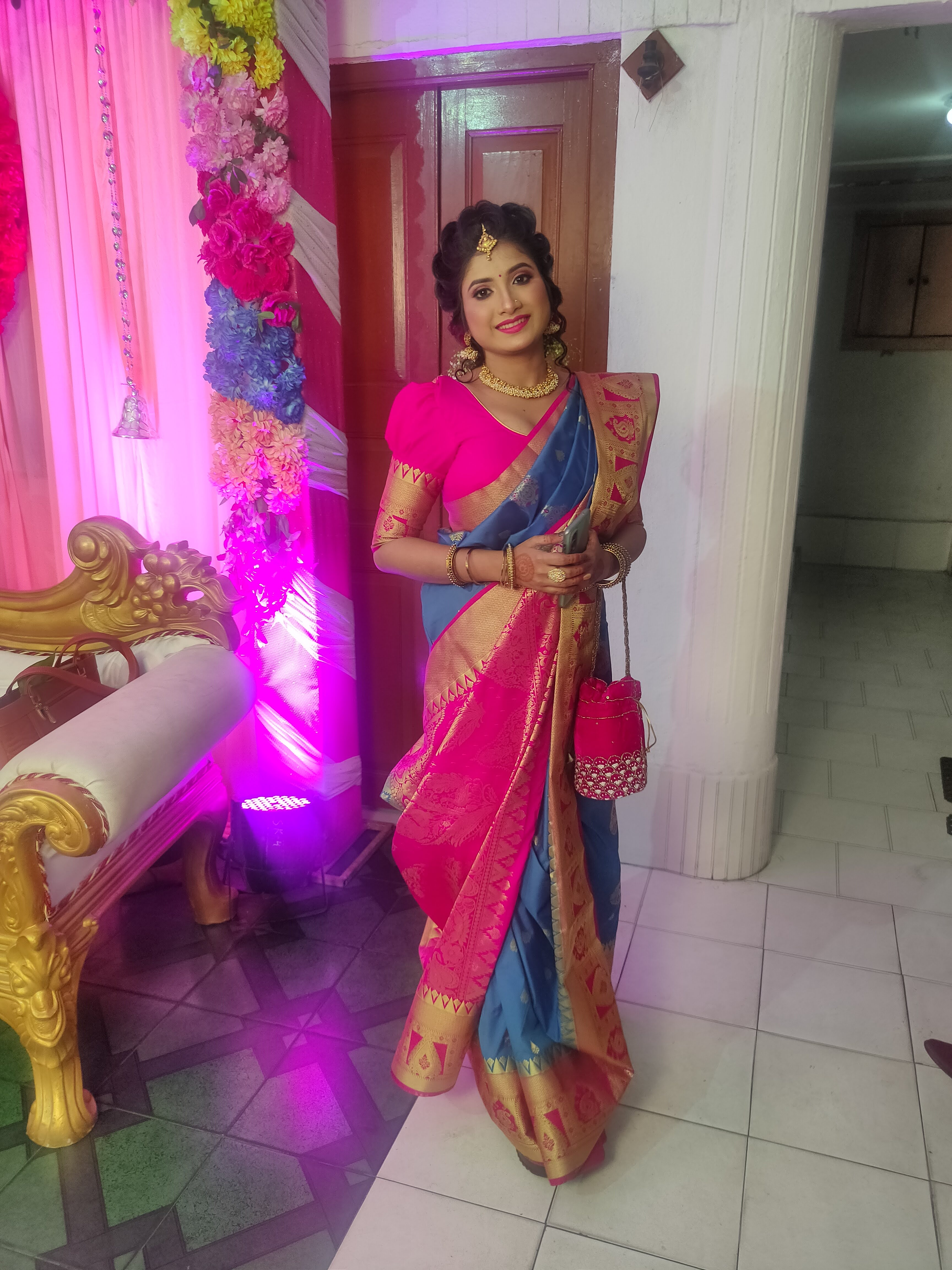
Sari is worn in Bengal using the Aat Poure draping style.

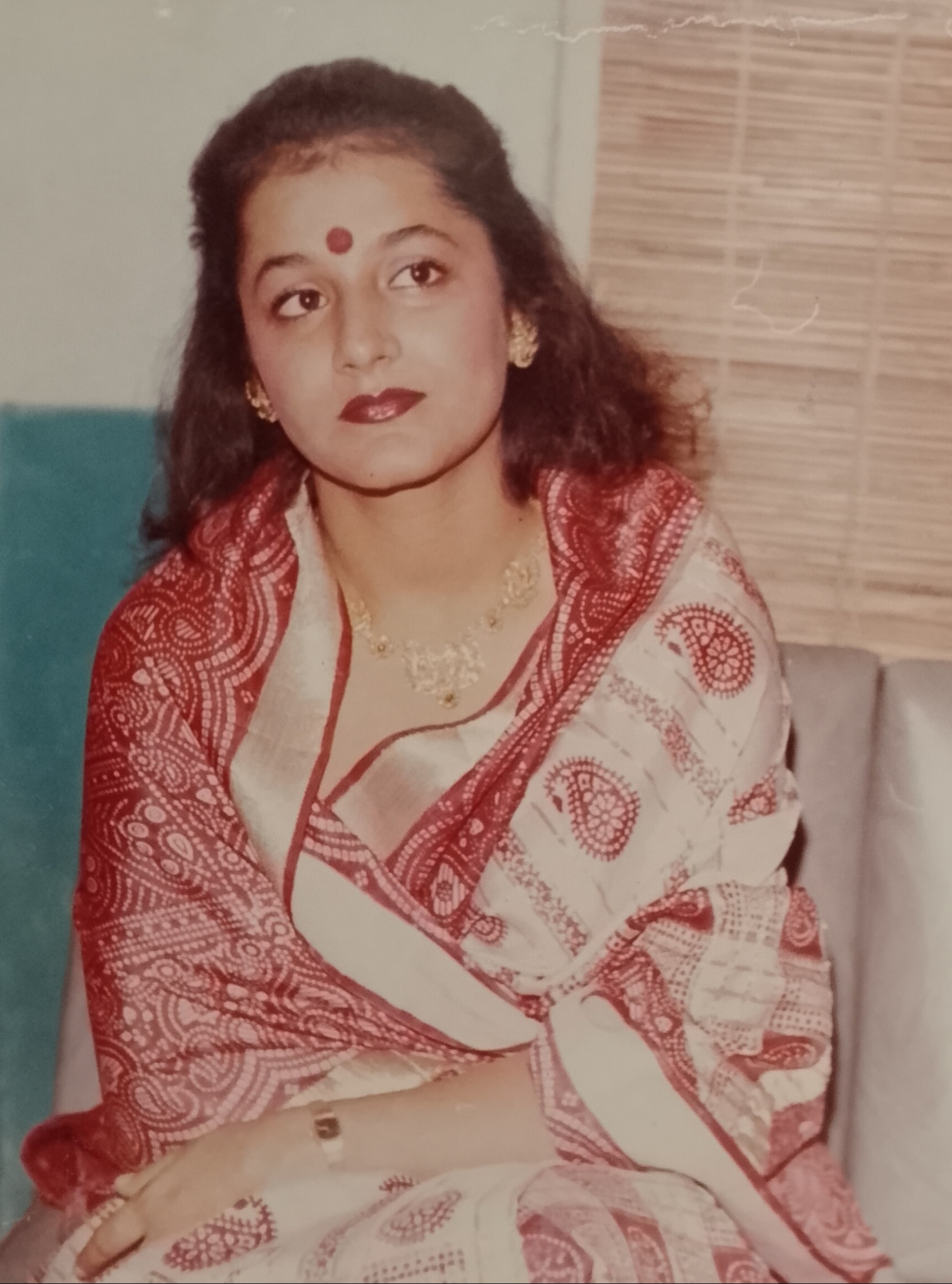
Princess of the Dar Raj wearing a traditional Bengali Saree

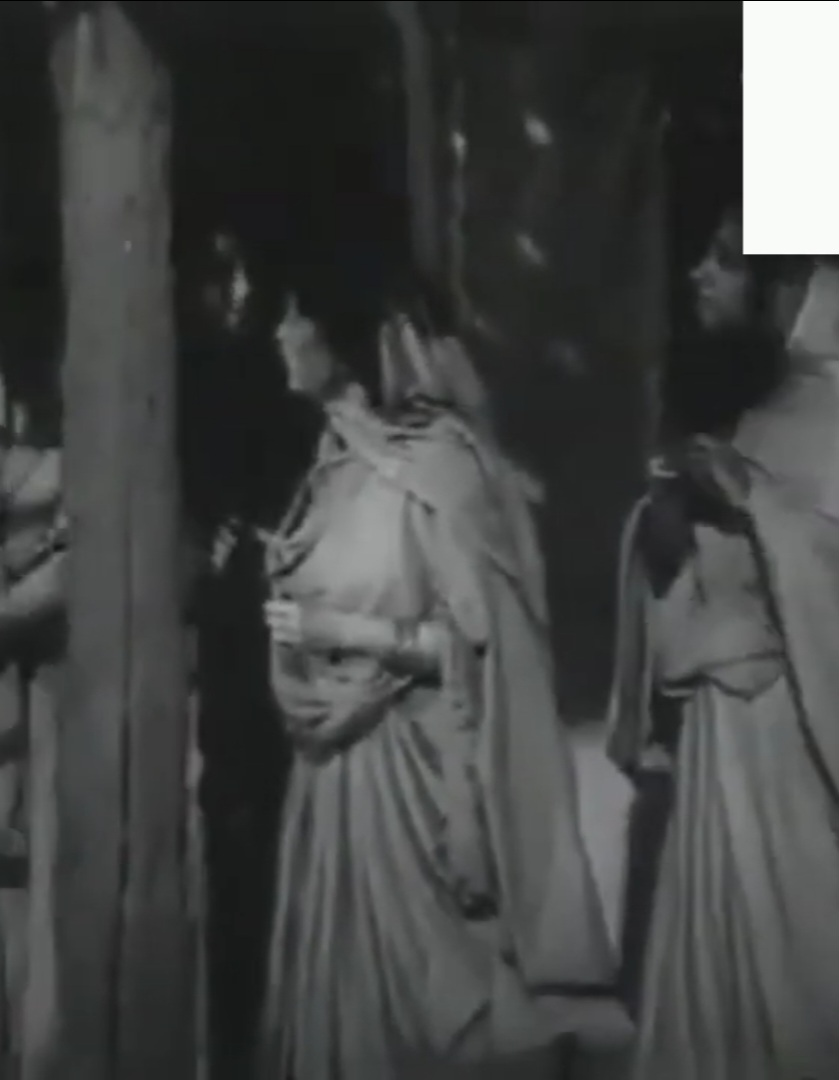
Maithil sari style in Kanyadan Maithili movie

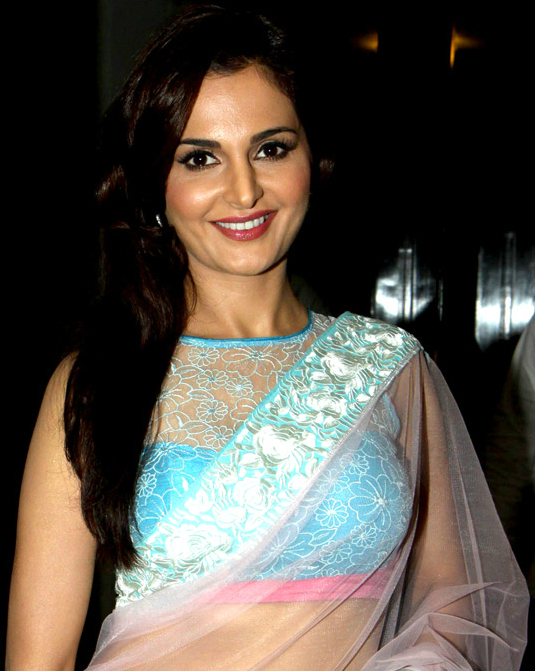
Monica Bedi, an Indian actress in sari and choli

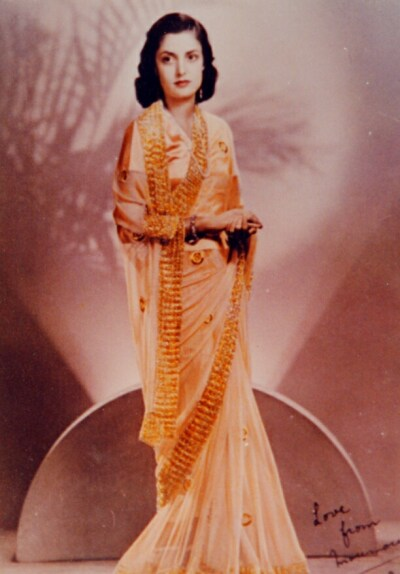
Maharani Ourmilla Devi of Jubbal in modern style of Nivi sari, 1935

A female construction worker wearing sari, Chittagong, Bangladesh

== See also ==
- Clothing in India
- Dhoti
- Ghagra choli
- Gharara
- Indian wedding clothes
- Lehenga
- Lehenga-style sari
- Sari cancer
- Sarong
- Shalwar kameez
