= Shantipur Handloom Industry =

Traditional handloom industry of West Bengal

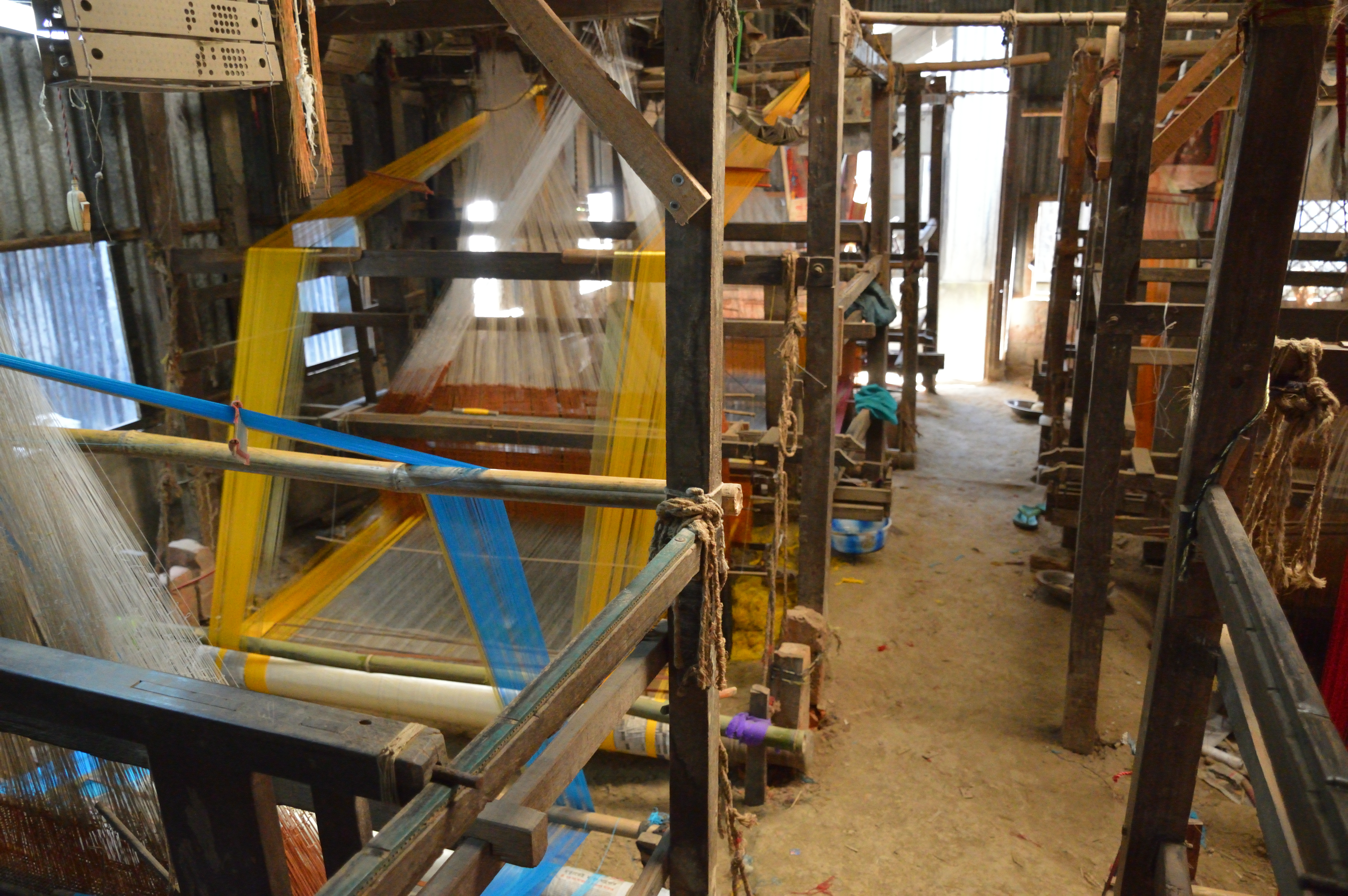
Interior of Lakshmi Textile Tant Workshop, a factory of Shantipur Handloom Industry at Natun Phulia.

Shantipur Handloom Industry, also known Shantipur Handloom Cluster, is a handloom weaving industry in Nadia district of West Bengal. It is one of the foremost handloom centers of India. This handloom industry is world famous for the production of cotton Sari (saree). The two main centers of this industrial zone are Shantipur and Phulia. Shantipur has an old reputation for cotton sarees, (Note: The saris of Shantipur and the intricately worked ones of Bishnupur also retain their old reputation.) known as Shantipuri sarees, and Phulia is well known for Tangail-Jamdani sarees. (Note: Phulia is the main production center of Tangail sarees in West Bengal. This saree is different from the Tangail Sarees produced in Tangail district of Bangladesh.)

Shantipur Handloom Industry has a long history. Handloom industry was developed in Shantipur as early as the 15th century. This handloom industry flourished during the Mughal and Nawab periods. But during the British Raj in India, Shantipur, like Bengal and other handloom industry centers of India, suffered a recession. However, after independence, Shantipur's industrial area expanded to neighboring Phulia.

At the end of the 20th century and the beginning of the 21st century, Shantipur Handloom Industry, which depended on handlooms, was threatened by mechanized looms. In the first decade of the 21st century, the Government of India launched the "National Handloom Development Programme" to develop the handloom industry in India. This program has led to the development of handloom industry Centers – Shantipur and Phulia – of Shantipur Handloom Industry. During the 2010s, the number of handlooms increased more at Phulia than in Shantipur. According to 2017 data, 32,000 looms and 93,000 weavers are engaged in production in the industrial area, including 20,000 looms and 60,000 weavers in Shantipur, the main production center, and 12,000 looms and 36,000 weavers in Phulia.

== History ==
=== Early History: Ancient age–1757 ===
Shantipur is mentioned in the Charyapada written between the 8th and 10th centuries. A number of weavers, tailors and master craftsmens came from Dhaka's Dhamrai in the 12th century at the request of Gaur king Lakshmana Sen and settled in Shantipur.

The beginning of the Shantipur weaving industry took place in the early 15th century. According to the oldest information available, the weaving program of Shantipur began in the year 1409 AD during the reign of Gaur Ganesh Danu Mardhanadeva. Advaita Acharya came from Sylhet and settled in Shantipur, as a result many weavers of the Vaishnava community came to Shantipur from Dhaka, Tangail, Bikrampur and other areas of East Bengal. During the first half of the 16th century, many weavers migrated from Dhaka to Shantipur in Nadia district because to the disturbances caused in East Bengal by Mogs and Arakan bandits. Due to the influx of weavers from East Bengal, Shantipur and the surrounding area gradually developed into a major textile center and its prosperity increased manifold. many weavers brought high-quality cotton seeds with them during migration from East Bengal to Shantipur, which they cultivated in their farmlands in East Bengal. The cotton produced from the high-quality cotton seeds of East Bengal was of much better quality than the local cotton of Shantipur. The fabric produced from this new variety of cotton was known as mulmul or Shantipuri mulmul. During the 15th–16th centuries, fabric was woven in Shantipur using 250–300 count fine yarn. This fineness reached the height of using 1000 count fine yarn during the Mughal period. During the reign of King Rudra Roy of Nadia, sari weaving was circulated. During the time of the Mughal Empire, the production of the handloom industry was well-regulated and organized, which led to the recognition of the production of excellent products. In the Mughal era, weaving products produced in Shantipur were exported to the Middle East and Europe. (Note: During the Mughal period, textiles (sarees) produced in Shantipur were exported to European countries like Greece, Middle East countries like Iran and Arab (countries), and the Eurasian country Turkey.)

In terms of exports of goods to Europe, Bengal reached a primary position within the Indian subcontinent from the last quarter of the 17th century, with English, Dutch and French companies involved in exports. The main export centers in Bengal were Dhaka, Chittagong, Shantipur, Malda etc. Besides the finest muslins and mulmuls of Bengal, the women of Shantipur and the surrounding areas also did fine embroidery. The prosperity and growing demand of Bengal textiles including Shantipur in the European market was due to its low cost of production. Labor cost was low as labor was available cheaply and thus cost of production was low.

In the 18th century, muslin was produced in Shantipur as well as Dhaka muslin. During the Nawabi period, the mulmul – the finest type of muslin – produced in Shantipur was bought by the European merchants and exported to Europe. The East India Company purchased Shantipur mulmul through local traders in Calcutta. Sushil Chaudhury – a historian of eighteenth-century Bengal – mentioned in the book From Prosperity to Decline: Eighteenth Century Bengal that 40 yards long and 3 yards wide Shantipur mulmul was purchased by the East India Company from local traders in Calcutta at the rate of 16 rupees. Five hundred employees lived in Kuthirpara, Shantipur, who were employed by the East India Company. Their job was to collect cloth woven by weavers of Shantipur through the small factory Ghai and the large factory Banak, and arrange for its export abroad.

=== Colonial History: 1757–1947 ===
Shantipuri muslin was of a very fine quality, although its quality was not the same as that of Dhakai muslin. During the reign of Raja Krishna Chandra, a group of Mallik youths from Ranaghat collected fine quality muslin from Shantipur and exported it to European countries. In the early 19th century, Representatives of the East India Company collected £170,000 of muslin from the Shantipur Handloom Industry. The fine quality cotton cloth produced in Shantipur was in great demand in the market, and the British recognized this cloth as muslin. At this time in Shantipur, very fine muslins 40 yards long and 2¼ yards wide were produced, which only a few weavers were able to weave well, and ordinary mulmuls were made by all the weavers, which were 40 yards long and 2 yards wide and 40 yards long and 2½ yards wide.

Nadia was one of the worst affected areas in Bengal during the Great Bengal famine of 1770, which damaged the weaving industry of Bengal, including Shantipur. A large number of people died in the famine which led to the collapse of agricultural activities. 25% of the weavers of Shantipur died due to this famine.

As the Industrial Revolution began in England, the employment of weavers was threatened. England and its Parliament had been keen to protect the growth of the Industrial Revolution since the 1700s. This effort began to materialize in the 1790s. But there is ample evidence from the 1780s, 1790s and even 1810–15 AD to prove that Shantipur textiles were extremely popular. Excluding the cloth produced at Kuthi, the company purchased cloth worth Rs 1.5 million annually in the 1790s. Restrictions were imposed in 1806 due to the blockade of Napoleon, which affected overall exports from Bengal and adversely affected Shantipur's fine textile exports. Even women who depended on the Shantipur handloom industry for their livelihood were severely affected. "Shantipur Kuthi" was closed in 1818 AD due to lack of demand. After the closure of Kuthi, weavers and handloom workers (both men and women) faced severe financial problems. Later the English company inspired the weavers to weave finer fabrics, causing Shantipur's weaving and handloom industries to temporarily regain prominence. A sense of pride in work and awareness of rights kept Shantipur's handloom industry alive. Researcher Debashree Mukherjee points out that the weavers of Shantipur remained attached to the weaving industry despite adverse conditions as the ultimate struggle of the working class for a dignified life. This struggle started long before the Swadeshi movement.

In Shantipur, weavers played a leading role in participating in the Swadeshi movement (1905–1917). Shantipur had about 1,200 handlooms during the Swadeshi movement organized to oppose the partition of Bengal or Bang-Bhang (1905). 1906 AD to 1915 AD was the period of revival of Shantipur weaving industry. however, the First World War interrupted progress. Shantipur Handloom Industry has seen huge changes since the 1920s. Between 1920 and 1925, The barrel Dobby launched the Darga Das Kastha, Which provided the conversion of the throw shuttle into a fly shuttle. Later, Debbendra Nath Mukherjee introduced the Jacquard machine and this facilitated a wide cross section of the new design in the market. According to the data obtained, the first 100 hook capacity Jacquard was first installed by Jatindra Nath Lohori for producing variety of cloth during the third decade of the twentieth century. In the past, Shantipur sarees were very popular for fine and uniform weaving. In Bengal, mill thread was introduced in 1885 and bilti chicon thread in 1921; as a result, the Shantipur handloom industry gradually began to decline. The weavers found the weaving profession unprofitable and switched to other professions, as a result the number of weavers in the Shantipur Handloom Industry gradually decreased. According to a survey conducted in 1940 by the Bengal's Directorate of Industries, 10,000 of the total 27,000 peoples in Shantipur were reported to be members of weaving families.

=== Independent India: 1947–current ===
India was divided on the basis of religion in 1947; This partition of India divided Bengal into West Bengal and East Pakistan. After India's independence through the partition of British India, the Hindu weavers of East Pakistan had sought refuge in India, a section of whom settled in Shantipur and surrounding areas. The process of migration intensified during the Indo-Pak War in 1965, and reached its peak during the Bangladesh Liberation War in 1971. Like the weavers who came from East Bengal in the 16th century, the refugee weavers after 1947 contributed greatly to the prosperity and expansion of Shantipur handloom industry and industrial area.

In the early part of the 1980s, The Bengal Small Scale Aids Industry Act was the government's support for the growth in handloom industry. According to the law, a maximum of ₹10,000 was provided for the purchase of the handloom, of which 50% had grants and 50% loan. Later, due to the extra profit of the Mahajans, the income of the weavers declined. In the middle of the eighties and later in the mid-1990s, the movement was organized by weavers in Shantipur to increase wages, but this movement failed to suppress the Mahajans. Since the first decade of the 21st century, the Government of India has been trying to develop the Shantipur handloom industry through the "National Handloom Development Programme".

== Geographical area ==
Shantipur is situated under Ranaghat sub-division of Nadia district of West Bengal, a place of ancient culture, religion and tradition and has its own glory. The geographical coordinates of the Handloom Industry are 23°15′N and 88°26′E, which is about 90 km (56 mi) from Kolkata. The industrial area developed in the Ganges Delta on the eastern bank of the Bhagirathi river, one of the two main tributaries of the Ganges. This industrial area is spread over the Santipur Municipality area and surrounding rural areas, which is spread over an area of 25 square miles (65 km^{2}). Small and large weaving factories in the industrial area are concentrated in rural and urban areas on both sides of the Ranaghat–Shantipur–Krishnanagar railway and National Highway 12. The main production center Shantipur is located 18 kilometres (11 mi) from the district headquarters Krishnanagar and 16 km (9.9 mi) from the sub-divisional city of Ranaghat.

== Raw materials ==
The main raw materials required for this industry are cotton yarns, zari and silk yarns. West Bengal has a small amount of cotton cultivation and cotton yarn production, which is unable to meet the demand of handloom industrial areas of the state including Shantipur. West and South India mainly grow cotton and produce cotton yarns, which is supplied to industrial area through merchants or suppliers of Kolkata. Other types of yarn such as polyester filament, silk (mulberry, Chinese, Bangalore), and fine wool yarn are also used. Mulberry silk is produced in Murshidabad district and Tussar silk in Malda district of West Bengal; the silk produced in these two districts supplies the necessary silk to the weaving industry of Shantipur. Some silks are imported from South India, mainly Bangalore silks. Shantipur (Urban Area) has more than 100 yarn traders supplying various types of yarn and other chemicals needed in industry. More than 100 loom manufacturers and suppliers provide looms and parts of loom required in the handloom industry. Maku, the important component of the loom, is manufactured and supplied by local blacksmith's workshop.

== Products ==
This handloom industry is well known for the production of cotton cloth. Shantipur, Phulia and neighboring villages produce a variety of sarees, dhotis and dress materials. In the past, ten types of sarees were produced in Shantipur based on the design, thread and color used, among which Nilambari was the most famous. Earlier, various types of ornas were manufactured in Shantipur, such as chakmilan, bharee par ornas etc. chakmilan orna is woven with 300 count thread. Currently, both cotton sarees and jamdani sarees are manufactured in Shantipur. Sarees produced in Shantipur are marketed as Shantipuri sari; This saree has geographical indication tag. The industrial area also produces the famous Tangail sarees, which have earned the geographical indication rights under the title "Tangail Sarees of Bengal". Some products are produced for export, weavers get higher wages for weaving this product. This export-oriented weaving was first started with the encouragement of Handicrafts and Handlooms Export Corporation of India Limited and one of their Japanese customers Mr. Jurgen Lahl, a well-known textile designer. Exportable products include Scarves, stoles, various dressmaterials etc.

=== Saree ===
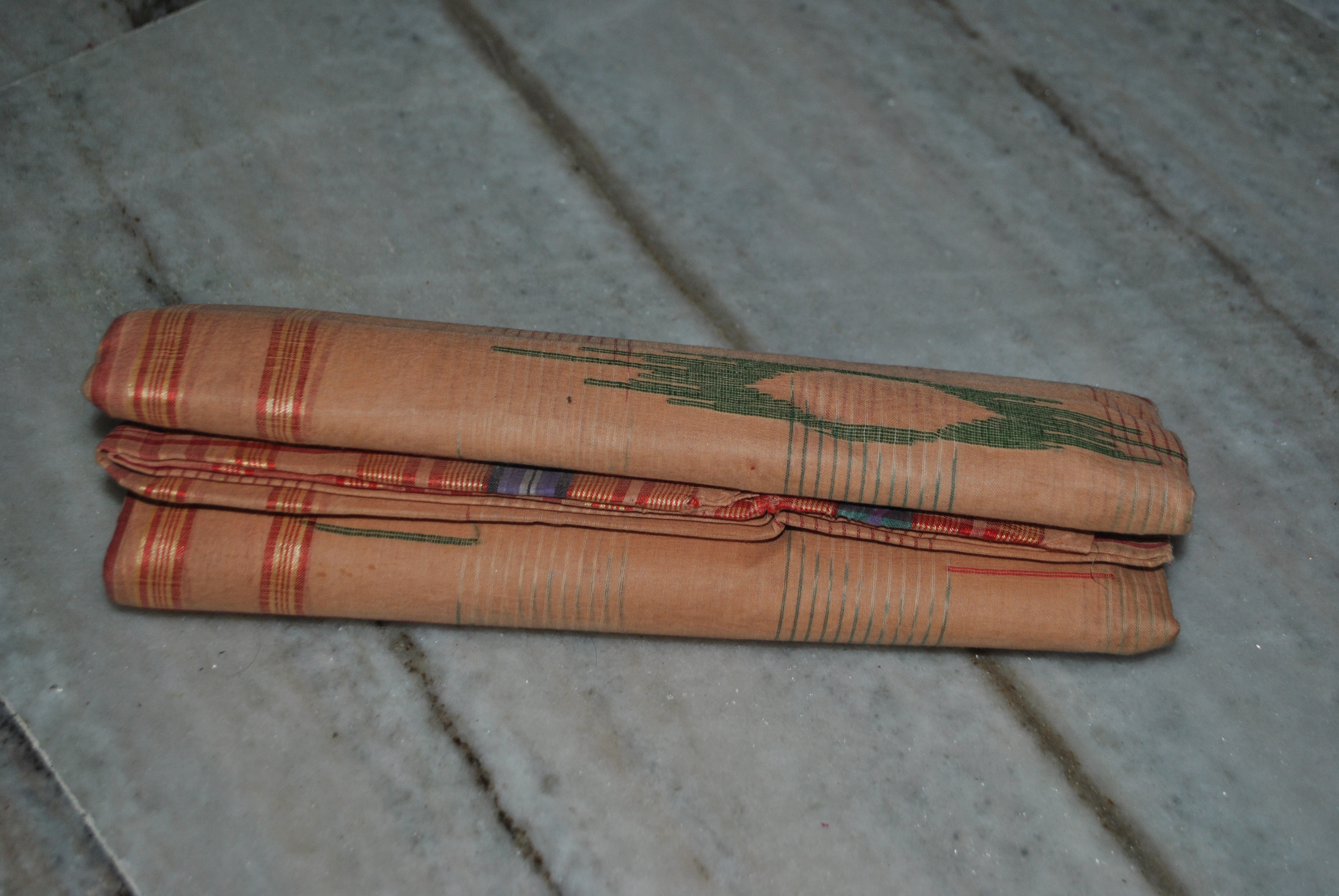
A Shantipuri sari with Guti Bhanj.

The most produced product in this industrial area is saree. The primary characteristics of Shantipuri sarees were their fine texture and delicately and elaborately designed borders. It is designed with smooth texture, light weight and extremely comfortable to wear. Silk or zari border is woven with needles. In the past, designs were initially traced with charcoal on soft silk texture and then the designs were woven directly on the fabric with needles. Nilambari sarees are woven with fine thread (100 count); different designs like chandmama, taj, tajkalka, choukalka, phuljhumka, parijaat, dhakai, karnish, tekka etc are made on the border of the saree with colored threads. This century-old style of Shantipuri sari is one of the favorite sarees of Bengali women. Shantipuri designs are also used in other ways to produce sarees by mixing silk and linen with fine cotton threads; only skilled and experienced weavers can weave this saree.

The weavers of Phulia – important manufacturing center of the Shantipur Handloom Industry – produce the Tangail saree. This saree is woven using Dhaka-Tangail style combination of Shantipuri tant (loom) saree using cotton yarn (100 count), silk yarn of various counts (14/16-20/22 denier), tussar yarn and also synthetic filament yarn. Tangail sarees produced in Phulia are famous for the fineness of hand-woven booties and fabric. Another saree from this handloom industry is Shantipuri Jamdani, which is quite popular in West Bengal. Based on the use of thread, three types of jamdani are produced, namely – cotton jamdani, half-silk jamdani and silk jamdani.

=== Dhoti ===
The most well-known product in this industrial area after the saree is the dhoti, popularly known as Shantipuri Dhoti. This dhoti is in demand all over Bengal; in the past, the demand was outside Bengal as well. Similar to the Shantipuri sari, the dhoti is woven with dense weave of fine thread. The weavers of Shantipur weave dhoti with 100–120 count fine thread, but in the 18th century, 250 to 300 count fine thread was used. The unique feature of Shantipuri Dhoti is the Jalchuri border.

== Workforce ==
=== Weaver ===
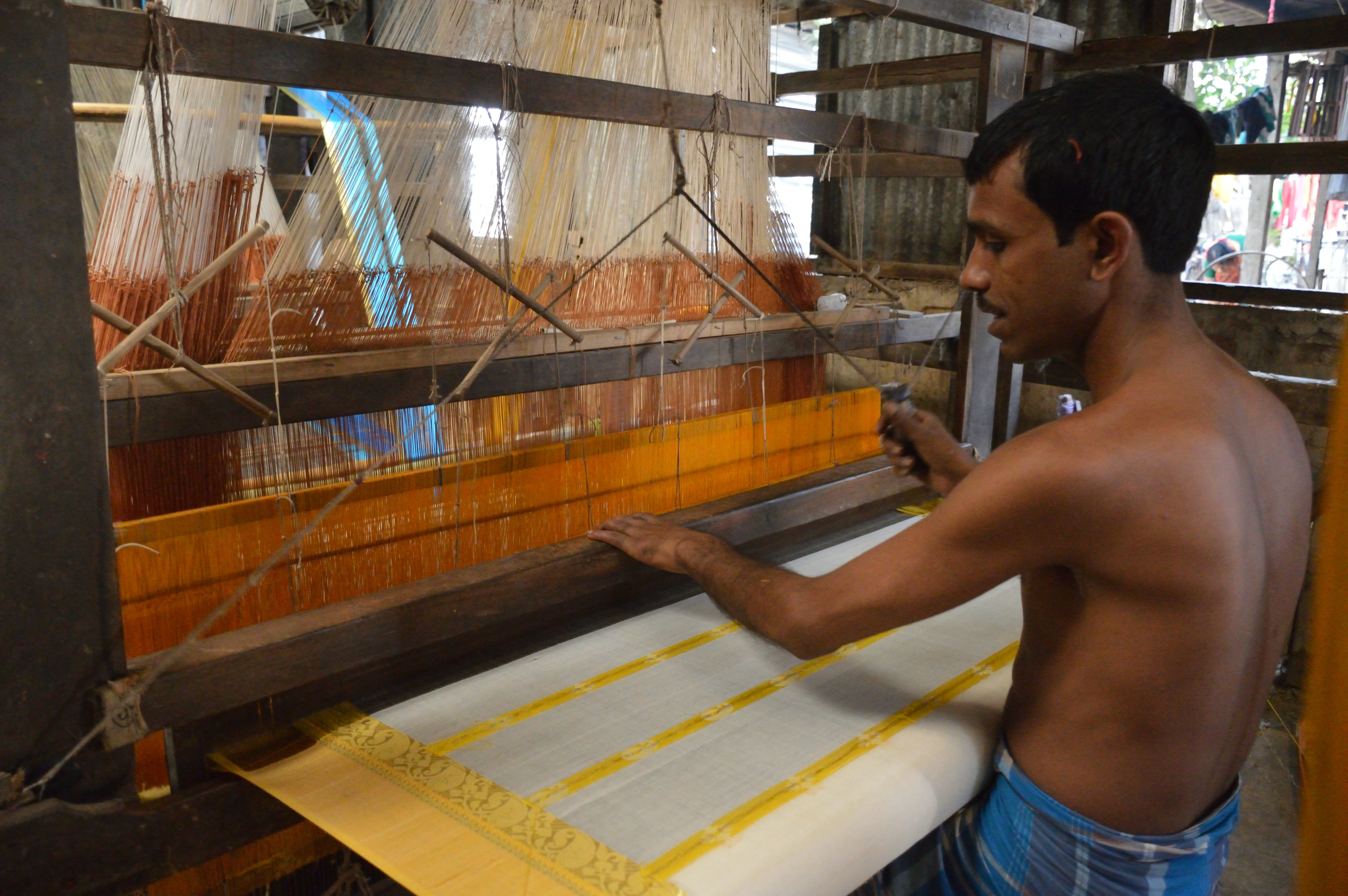
A weaver weaves a saree on a handloom at Natun Phulia, part of the Shantipur Handloom Industry.

==== Master weaver ====
These weavers take the overall responsibility of supplying raw materials to other weavers, providing designs and paying wages to grassroots weavers; and supplies the manufactured products to Mahajans. As per January 2016 data, there are about 700 skilled or master weavers actively involved in manufacturing activities in the industrial area. Earlier this class of weavers were engaged only in weaving. It is estimated that in total, there are 16 thousand looms under these master weavers and an equal number of ordinary weavers are employed. As per the size of the model unit, there are 4 looms under a master weavers. But, in reality factories with 10–60 handlooms have only a few masters for the ordinary weavers.

==== Ordinary weaver ====
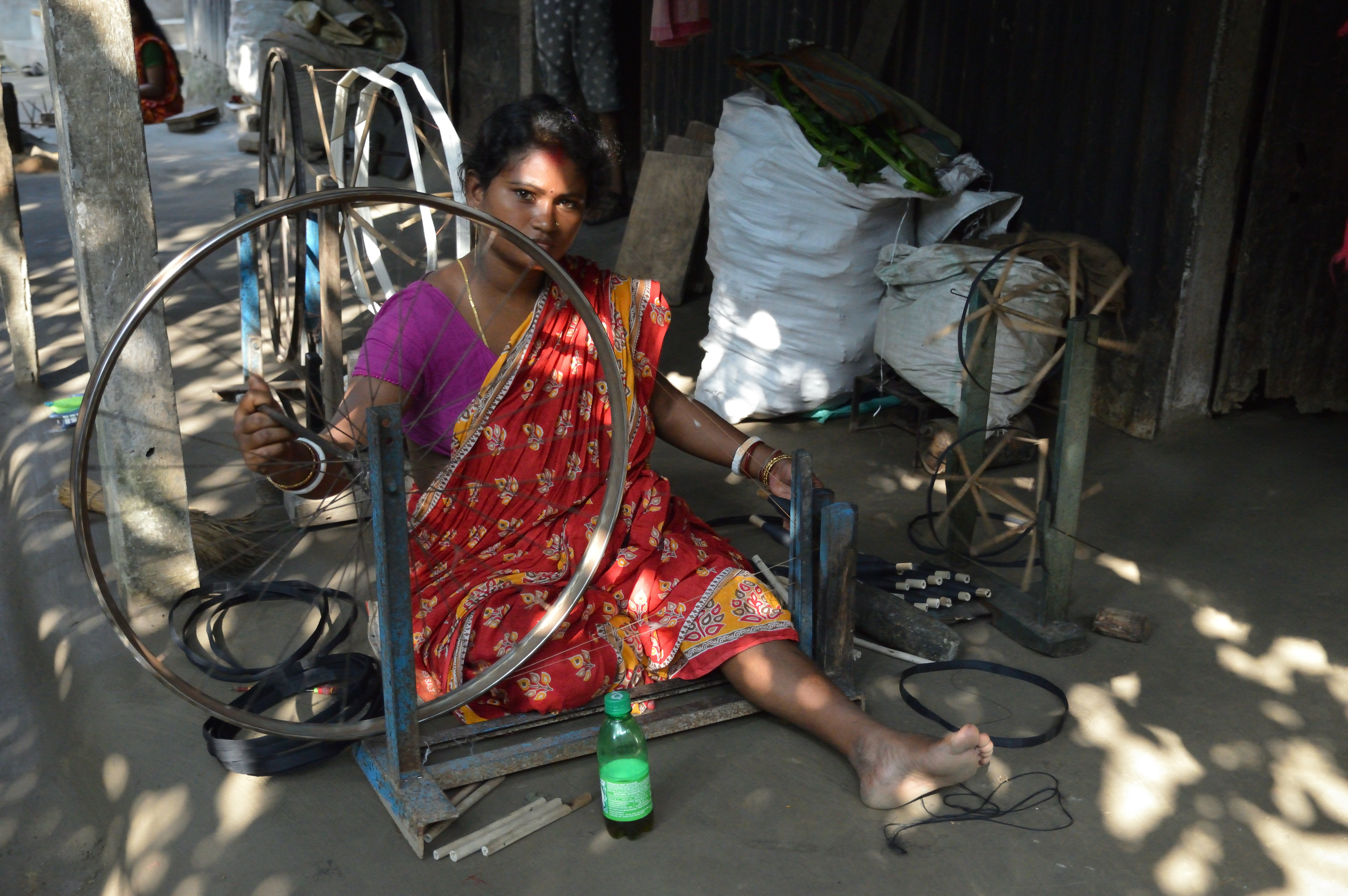
A woman rewinds threads for Weaving Tant Saree.

Ordinary weavers produce sarees, dhoti or other products under skilled or master weavers. All weavers have good weaving skills to weave sarees on jacquard looms. There are about 111 different weaver (tantee) communities in the industrial area, such as Prāmāṇika, Kāṣṭha, Dālāla, Khān etc. Most of the weavers belong to the Tantubāẏa community. As per January 2017 data, there are about 93,000 Ordinary weavers actively involved in manufacturing activities in the industrial area. The women mainly do the preparatory work like separating the hanks.

=== Designer ===
Designers create the design of the product, mainly sarees. They work on designing with their own creativity and imagination. Their main role in production is to create designs for the master weavers and supply them punch cards for Jacquard. As of January 2016, there are over 100 designers in this industrial area.

=== Dyers ===
Dyeing is mainly done in the dyeing unit. These units, Based on the quantity of dyed yarn are classified into large, medium and small units. Dyers boil with a mixture of dye and water. The next stage the excess water and dye mixture is separated from the yarns and dried in the sunshine. After that the yarns is sold to master weavers or traders. Yarn merchants employ large and medium scale units for dyeing, while small scale units work for master weavers. 60% of the total yarn sales are in the form of colored yarn, while the remaining 40% is in the form of gray yarn. About 90 units are doing commercial dyeing in the industrial area.

== Trade ==
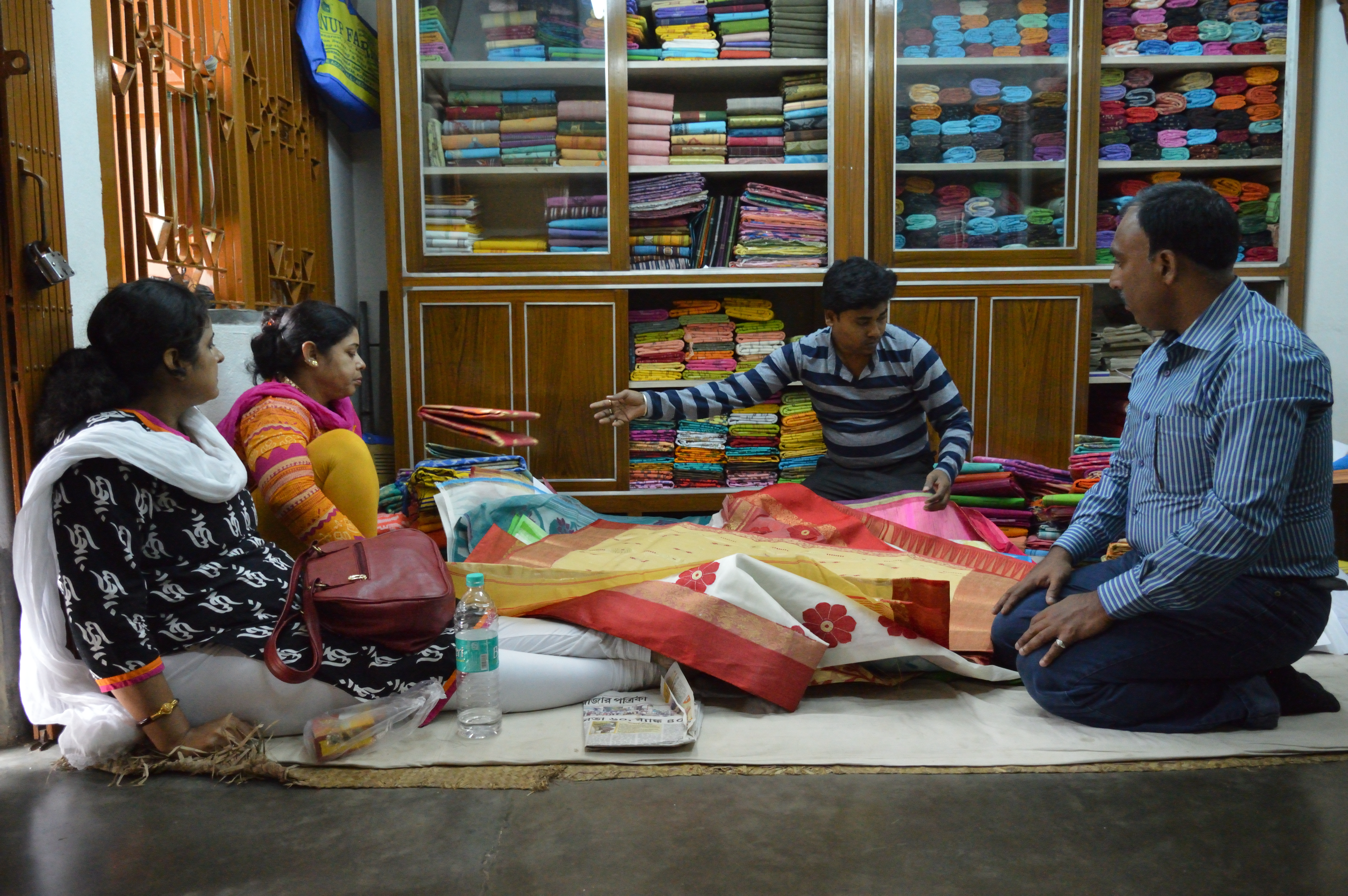
Sarees are being sold in the local market of Shantipur-Phulia area.

The products manufactured in Shantipur Handloom Industry mainly cater to the market demand of West Bengal as well as India. The products of this industrial area sold in the local market. Bangor Tant Kaporer Haat, Ghosh Market Tant Kaporer Haat, and Jagdhatri are the three main haats of Shantipur. More than 700 registered traders are associated with the Taant Vastra Vyabsayee Samiti, formed by traders in the industry, and they are the main people involved in marketing activities. Weaving associations supply products to traders in various cities of India including Kolkata. Some associations supply products abroad through various merchant exporters. Shantipur handloom products like Saris and Dhoti are mostly exported to Bangladesh, Japan, Italy, Thailand, United Kingdom, Australia and Germany, and countries of North America and Middle East. Annual turnover of Shantipuri sari is estimated at ₹4 billion. On the other hand, the annual trade of Tangail sarees produced in West Bengal is ₹15 billion; a large part of the production of these sarees is produced in Phulia, an important center of the industrial area.
