= Tangail saree =

Traditional hand-woven cotton saree of Bangladesh

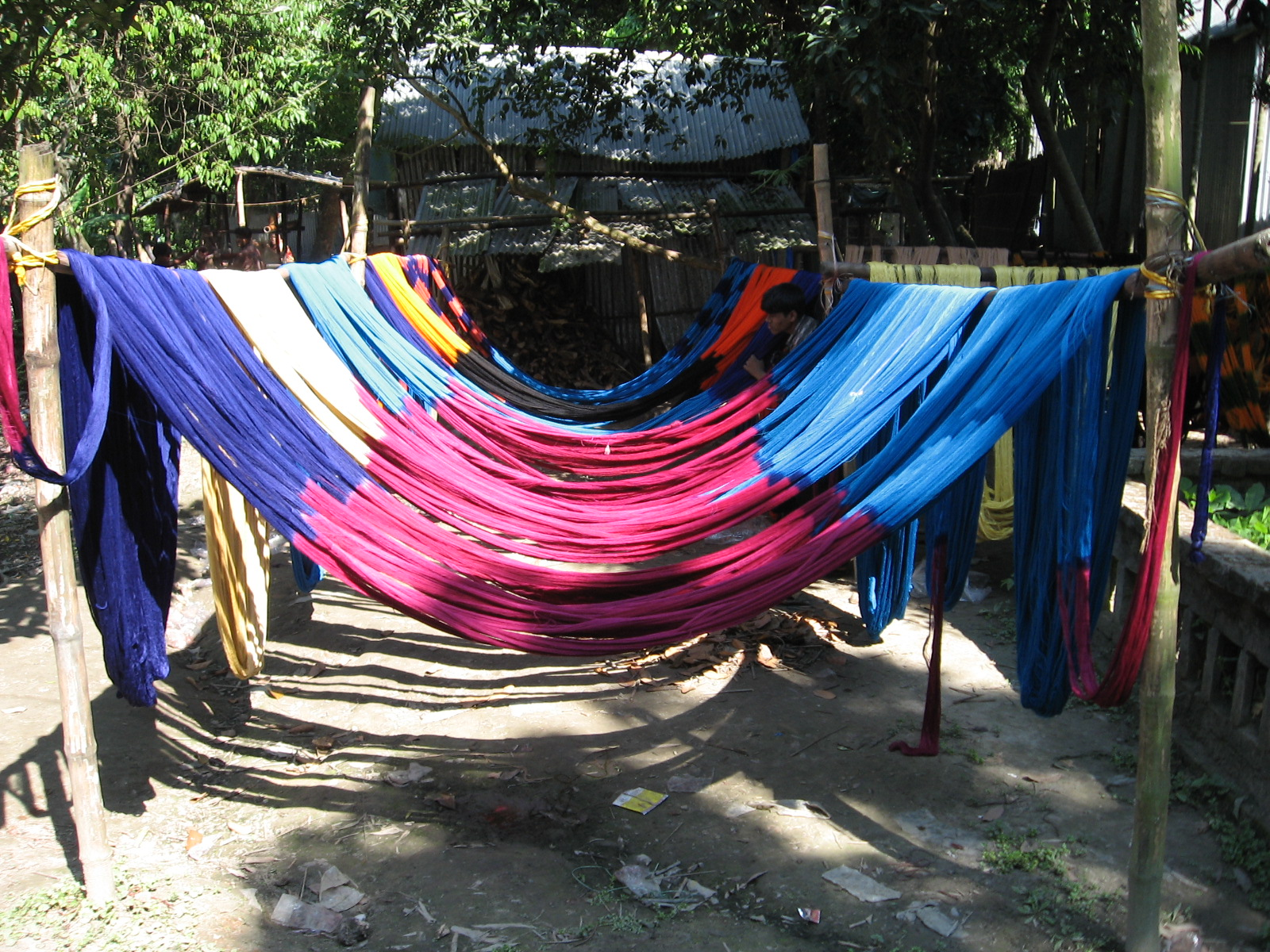
- Colored cotton threads hung to dry during production of Tangail saree in Tangail district, Bangladesh

Production area
- Country: Bangladesh
- Location: Tangail, Bangladesh

Details
- Ingredients: Cotton and silk
- Style: Bengal tradition
- Usage: Everyday

Status

Traditional saree weaving art of Tangail
- UNESCO Intangible Cultural Heritage
- Country: Bangladesh
- Reference: 02322
- Region: Asia and the Pacific

Inscription history
- Inscription: 2025 (20th session)
- List: Representative

Tangail saree is a traditional handwoven sari of Bangladesh. It originated in the Tangail district of the country. The traditional weaving art of Tangail saree was recognized as UNESCO Intangible Cultural Heritage in 2025.

== History ==
At the end of the 19th century, the handloom industry of Tangail in Bengal flourished. Tangail sari weavers of Bangladesh are descendants of traditional muslin weavers. Dhamrai and Chauhatta of Dhaka district were the original residence of Tangail Saree weavers of Bangladesh. Later settled in Tangail and in the beginning they made cloth without designs.

Historically, cotton weaving was an important industry in the Nadia district of Bengal.. During the late eighteenth and early nineteenth century, Shantipur was the center of a large and prosperous weaving industry. In 1898 AD, almost all the villages in this district had a few weavers. The weaving industry of Shantipur faced a major threat in the late nineteenth century due to the introduction of cloth from England. The weavers found the trade unprofitable and switched to other professions, resulting in a gradual decline in the number of weavers in the industry. However, according to a survey conducted in 1940 by the Department of Industries, Bengal, 10,000 out of a total of 27,000 people in Shantipur were reported to be members of weaving families.

Every member of the weaver's family was involved in the weaving of Tangail sarees produced in undivided Bengal i.e. East Bengal of British India. No weavers or laborers were hired, which was the practice of not letting the weaving technique go outside the weaver's family. The Basak families were the original saree weaving families of Tangail. These weavers were mainly from the Hindu "Basak" community. After the partition of the country in 1947, most of the traditional weavers, including most of the Basak weavers community, of this region started migrated to West Bengal from East Pakistan (now Bangladesh). The process of migration intensified in 1965, and reached its peak in 1971 during the Indo-Pak War and the Bangladesh Liberation War. Due to the fear of communal violence, cost of raw materials increasing several times, non-availability of loans from the government, crisis in transportation of goods, lack of business security Hindu weavers gradually migrated from Bangladesh to India, which was mentioned in a research paper published in a journal in 2014.

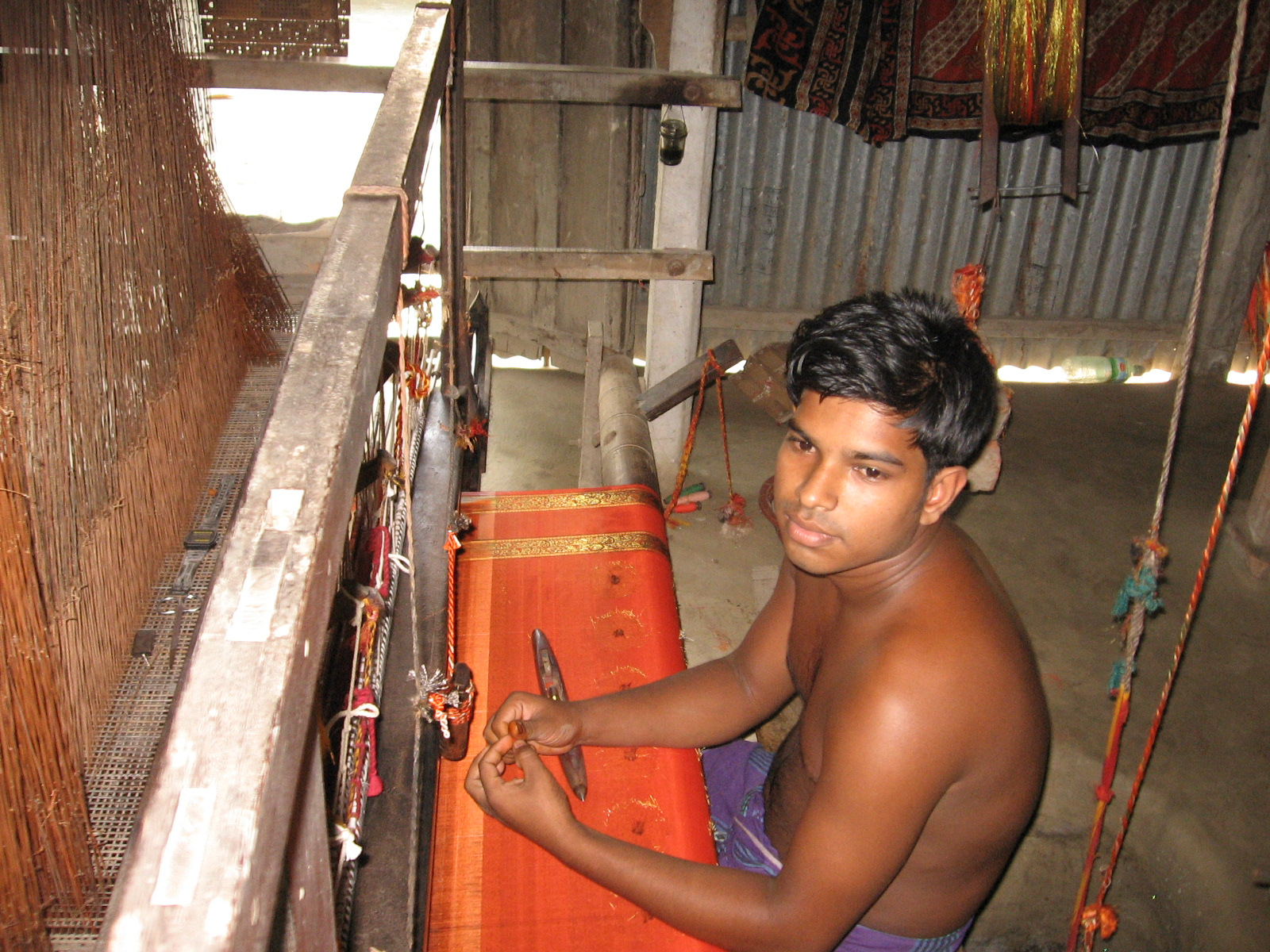
A weaver from Berabuchna village in Tangail, Bangladesh

At present, Muslim weavers also weave this saree along with the weavers of the "Basak" community in Tangail.

=== West Bengal saree ===
Traditionally, Shantipur of Nadia and Kalna City of Purba Bardhaman districts are famous centers for handwoven fabrics, hence basak weavers settled in these places and surrounding areas. However, the Basak community maintained their weaving technique through many adversities. Most of the weavers with the help of looms brought with them from East Pakistan (East Bengal, now Bangladesh) and Others with the help of looms provided by the Government of India and Government of West Bengal continued to weave sarees even in refugee camps; many weavers joined the weaving industry of West Bengal as workers in looms owned by local weavers in santipur, Dhatrigram and Samudragarh.

With government encouragement and assistance, weavers from East Bengal soon revived their ancestral profession and the weaving industry flourished again. The weavers of the Basak community of East-Bengal mastered the technique of weaving and designing the Shantipuri loom saree while employed as laborers in the weaving centers of the local weavers of West Bengal and with the help of the local weavers. Later, the weavers of the Basak community were able to mixing the Dhaka-Tangail style with the Shantipuri loom sari. In this mixing a new sari is produced; this new saree produced in West Bengal came to be known as "Tangail saree", which was different from the Tangail saree produced in East-Bengal. Like the Bangladeshi Tangail saree, it is also a simplified version of the famous Jamdani technique.

Tangail sarees in West Bengal are traditionally woven on fly shuttle pit looms using 100S cotton yarn, silk yarn of various counts (14/16-20/22 denier), tasar yarn and also synthetic filament yarn. Sarees are woven using two or more shuttles. The sarees have a variety of border features including plain border or extra warp jacquard designs, with simple traditional color patterns on the anchal (আঁচাল) or colorful cross borders with extra weft designs. The body of the fabric (saree) may be plain or decorated with booties using additional warp/weft with or without Jacquard. In this Tangail saree (Jamdani variety), extra weft threads are inserted to create an extra-weft design, maintaining a ratio of 1:2 between extra weft and ground weft. The specialty of the design is that the edges of the design are like steps, which is similar to the graphical design.

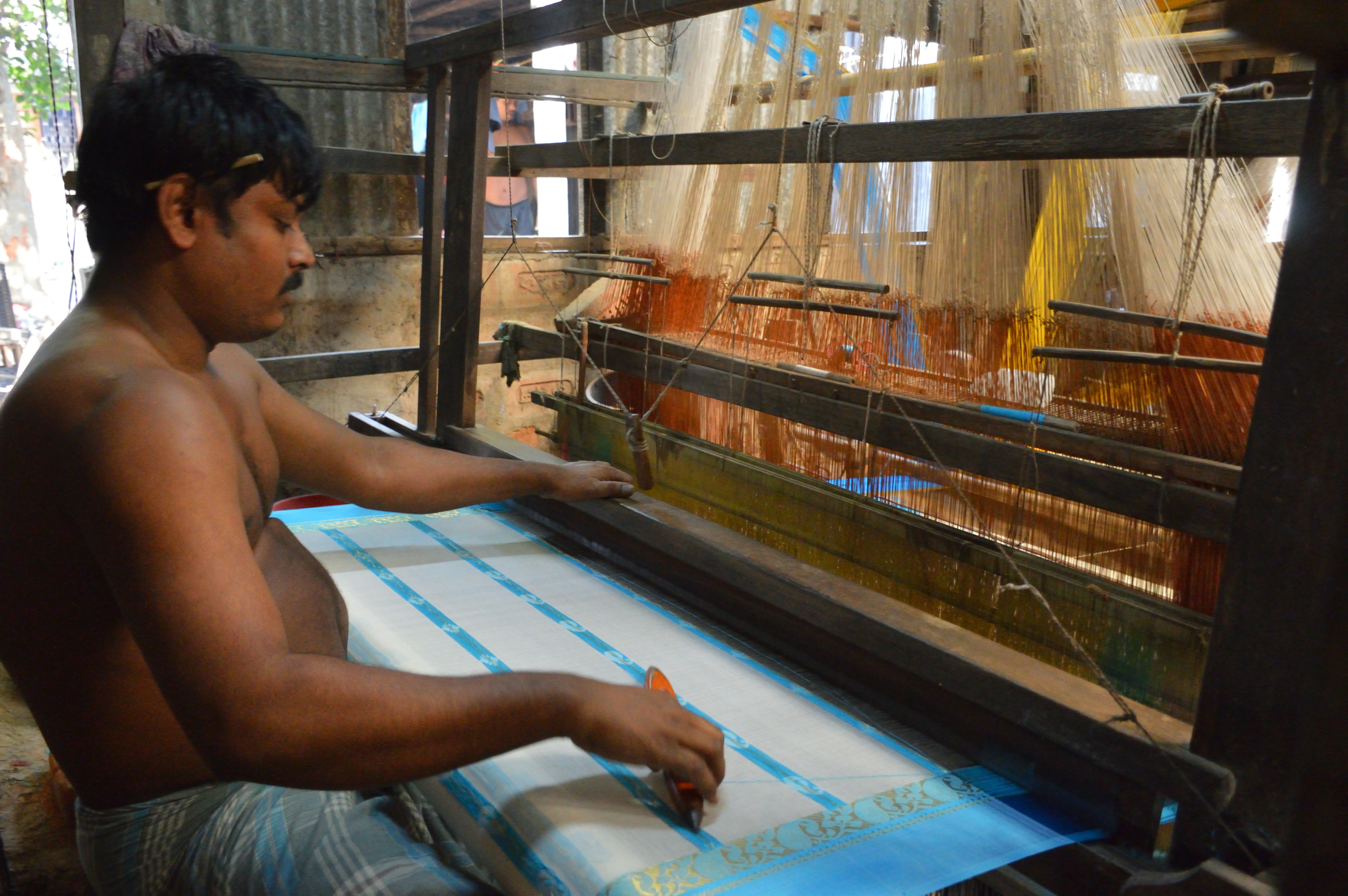
A weaver weaves a saree.

The traditionally produced Tangail saree in West Bengal is characterized by a special physical finish, which makes it free from "reed mark" (jorebhanga) giving it a special look and feel. Also characterized by the stiff finish.

The "Basak" weaver community was the first to start making this saree. In 2024, 20,000 weavers are involved in Tangail saree weaving in Nadia and Purba Bardhaman districts of West Bengal. This saree is folded in Guti Bhanj.

==== Criticism ====
West Bengal State Handloom Weavers Cooperative Society Limited applied for Geographical indication or GI tag for West Bengal's Tangail saree in 2020. On 2 January 2024, Geographical indication or GI tag under the title "Tangail Saree of Bengal" or Banglar Tangail Sari was issued from the office in Chennai, India. According to the certificate received, the registration of the product will be valid till 7 September 2030.

Criticism started in Bangladesh, when West Bengal's Tangail saree was given a Geographical Indication or GI tag. As per Bangladeshi media, Biswa Bangla Biponi of Kolkata is selling Tangail sarees as Phulia products by taking advantage of the GI tag. On the other hand, according to Journal No. 178 published by the Chennai-based office of Geographical Indication, the West Bengal's Tangail saree – basically a fusion of East Bengal and West Bengal handwoven sarees – is a different saree from the Bangladeshi Tangail saree.
