= Dhakai =

Feminine garment from Bangladesh

A Dhakai (Daccai), often considered as a type of sari (traditional cloth for women of Bengal) is a traditional attire of women in Bengal made with cotton. The name comes from the Dhaka (Dacca)city, capital of Bangladesh, where this type of fabric is usually made.

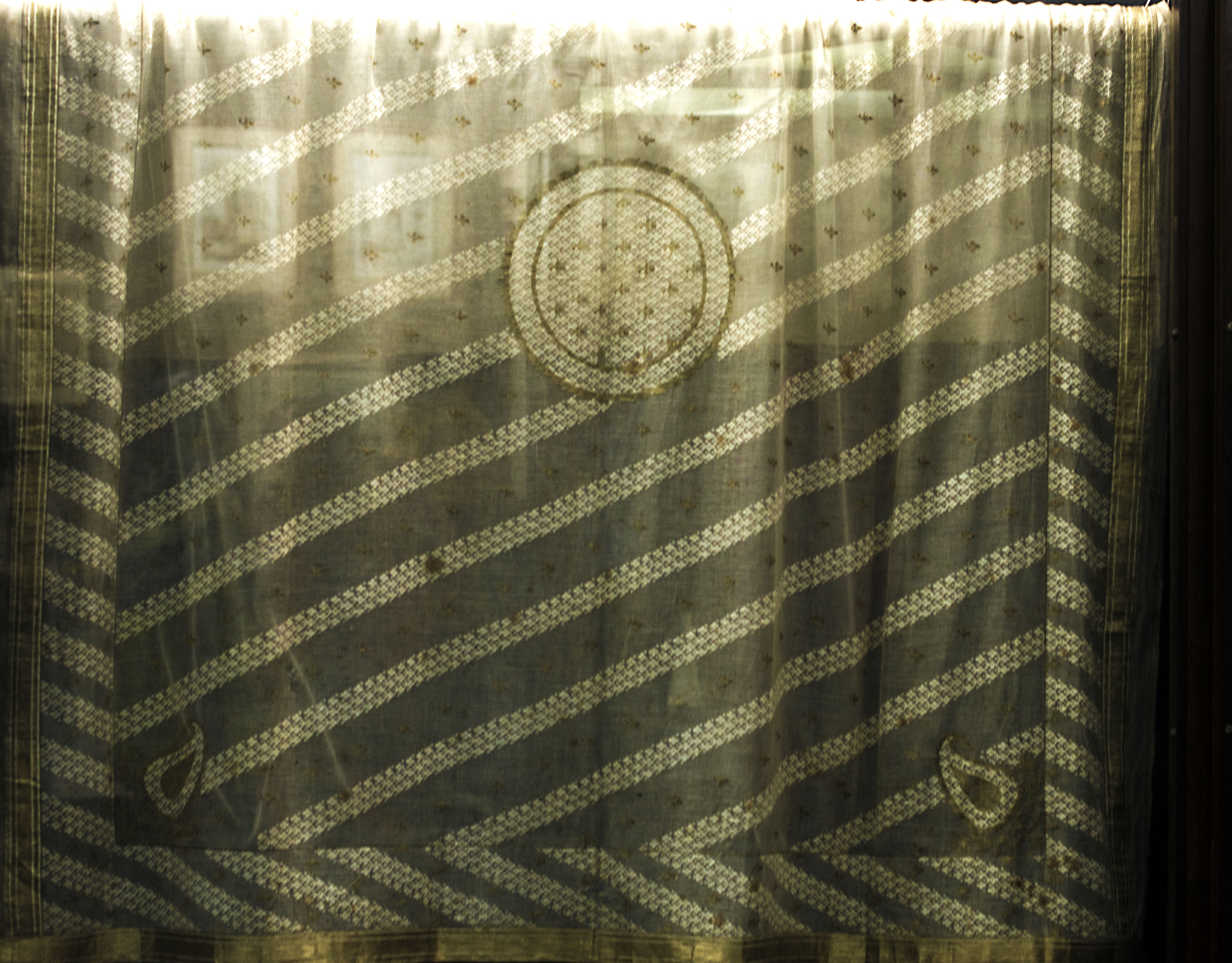
Dhakai Muslin

== History ==
The unique hand technique of weaving was called jamdani in the old days, while the weave was called Dhakai. The sensitive weavers and artisans of this art form took inspirations for their weave designs from the life around them, from simple things such as a broken comb to things in the nature such as flora and fauna and traditional Bengali designs known as Alpana.
