= Biswa Bangla =

Company promoting handicrafts and textiles of West Bengal

- Type: State-owned enterprise
- Industry: Small and medium-sized enterprises
- Founded: 2014
- Headquarters: Kolkata, West Bengal, India
- Area served: India
- Key people: Partho Kar, chief consultant
- Products: Handicrafts, food items, clothing
- Revenue: ₹350 million (US$3.6 million) (2019)
- Website: www.biswabangla.in

Biswa Bangla is an MSME enterprise established by the Government of West Bengal to promote handicrafts and textile of the Indian state of West Bengal.

== History ==
The former Manjusha brand under the West Bengal Handicrafts Development Corporation was a loss bearing enterprise. Manjusha posted its first operational profit of Rs 3.15 crore since 1976, while Tantuja (under the West Bengal State Handloom Weavers Cooperative Society), set up in 1945, made record operational profits in 2015–16 at Rs 3.5 crore. Until 2013, the two entities – established with the purpose of promoting and marketing the craftsmanship of Bengal – were heavily subsidised by the state government. After coming to power in 2011, Mamata Banerjee initiated the development of a micro, small and medium enterprises. In 2013, Biswa Bangla came into existence to promote the state's dying arts and crafts. The first store to sell products under the brand launched in 2014 in Kolkata.

== Products ==
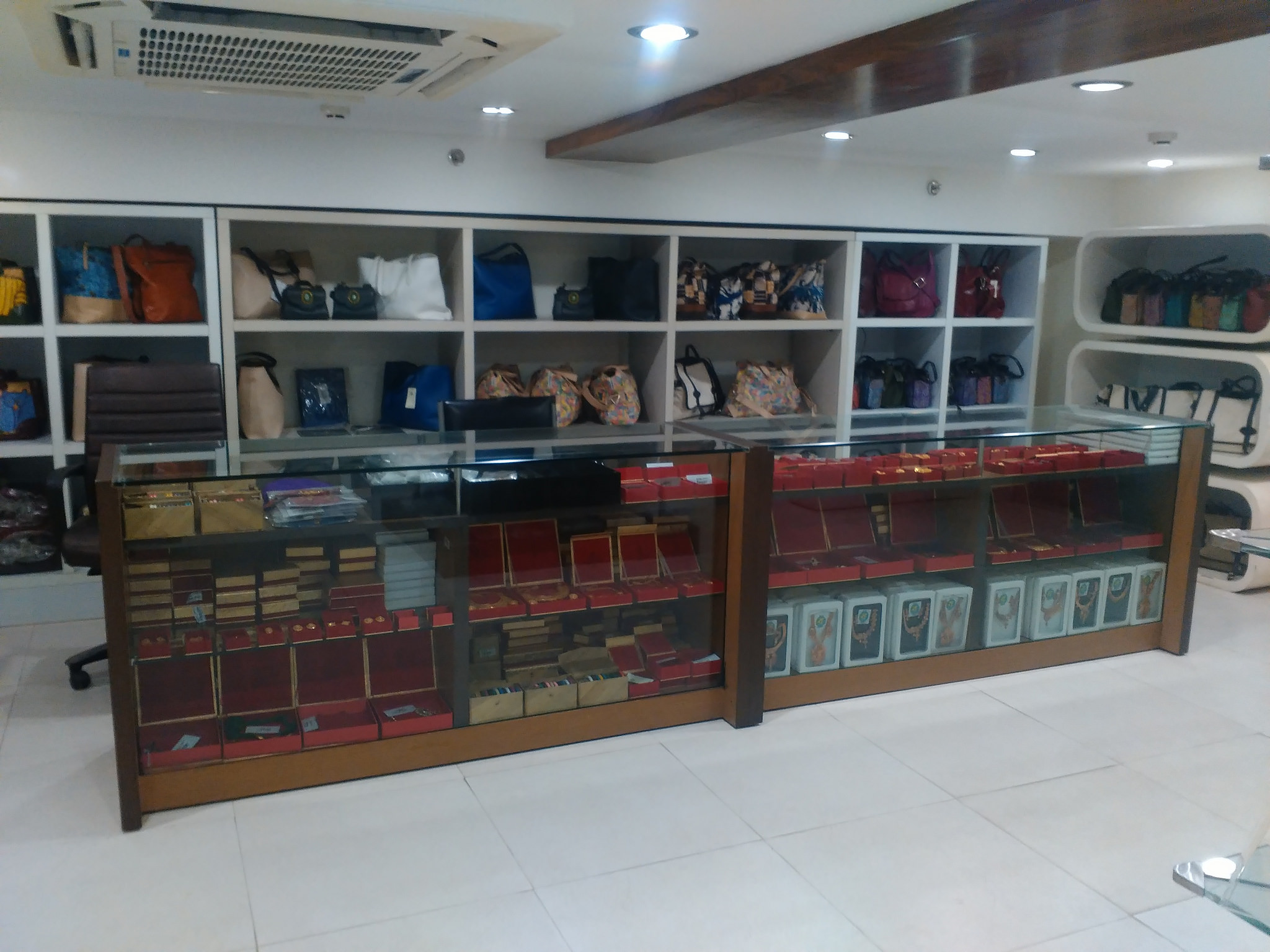
Various products at display at Biswa Bangla

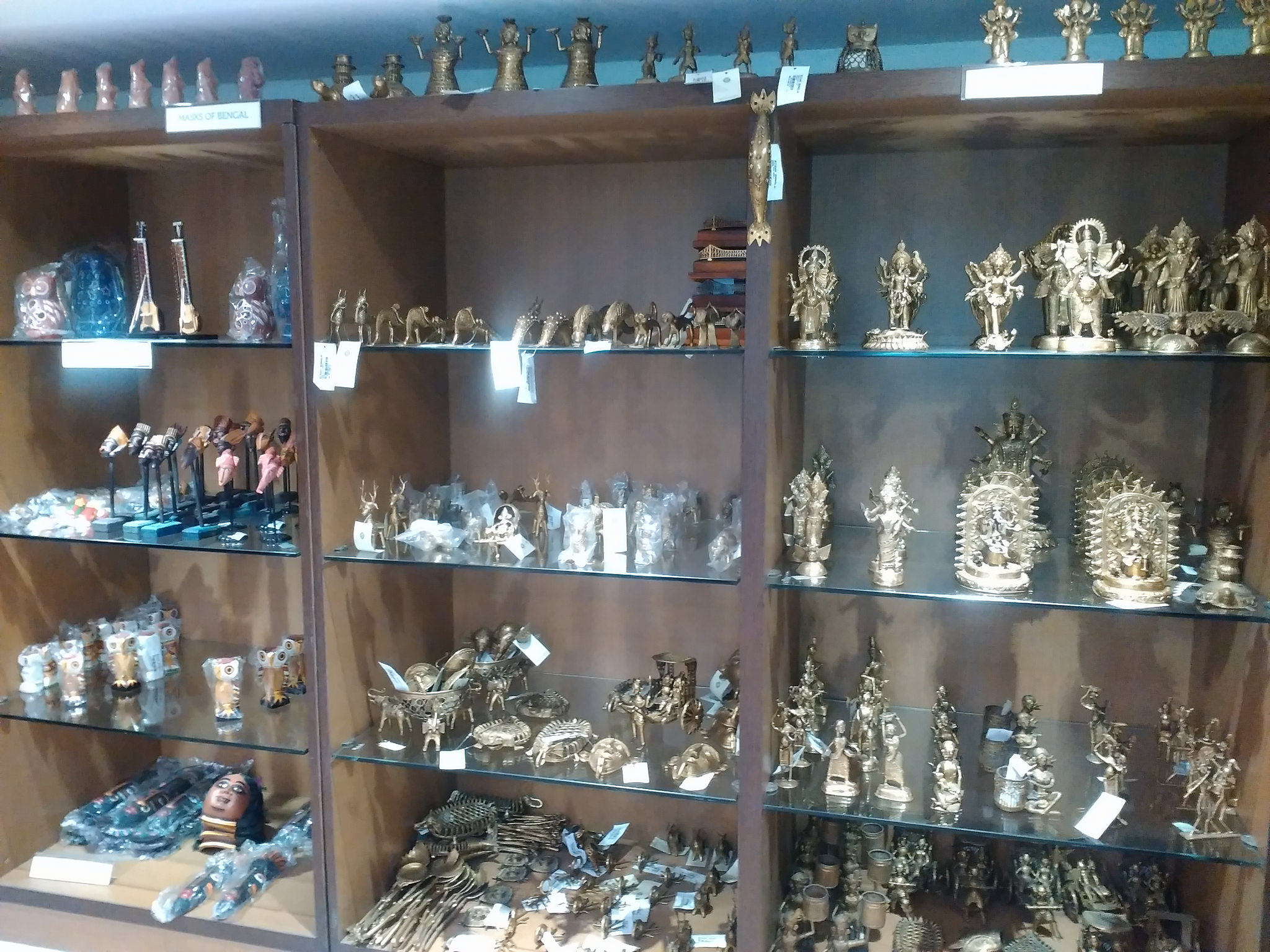
Handicrafts at the New Delhi store

Biswa Bangla has more than 5,000 products, including a collection of 24 kinds of dolls from various parts of the state. Muslin products sold at Biswa Bangla stores include handkerchiefs, dhotis, boxer pants, dyeing rolls, bed sheets and clothes for men and women. Products being revived is the Carmichael Rumal, a handkerchief made of Murshidabad silk. The arts being revived at Biswa Bangla are Indo-Portuguese shawls – each of which takes about six months to embroider – muslin, Darjeeling tea, masks, attar perfumes, Kalimpong cheese, mustard sauce and honey from the Sunderbans.

== Showrooms ==
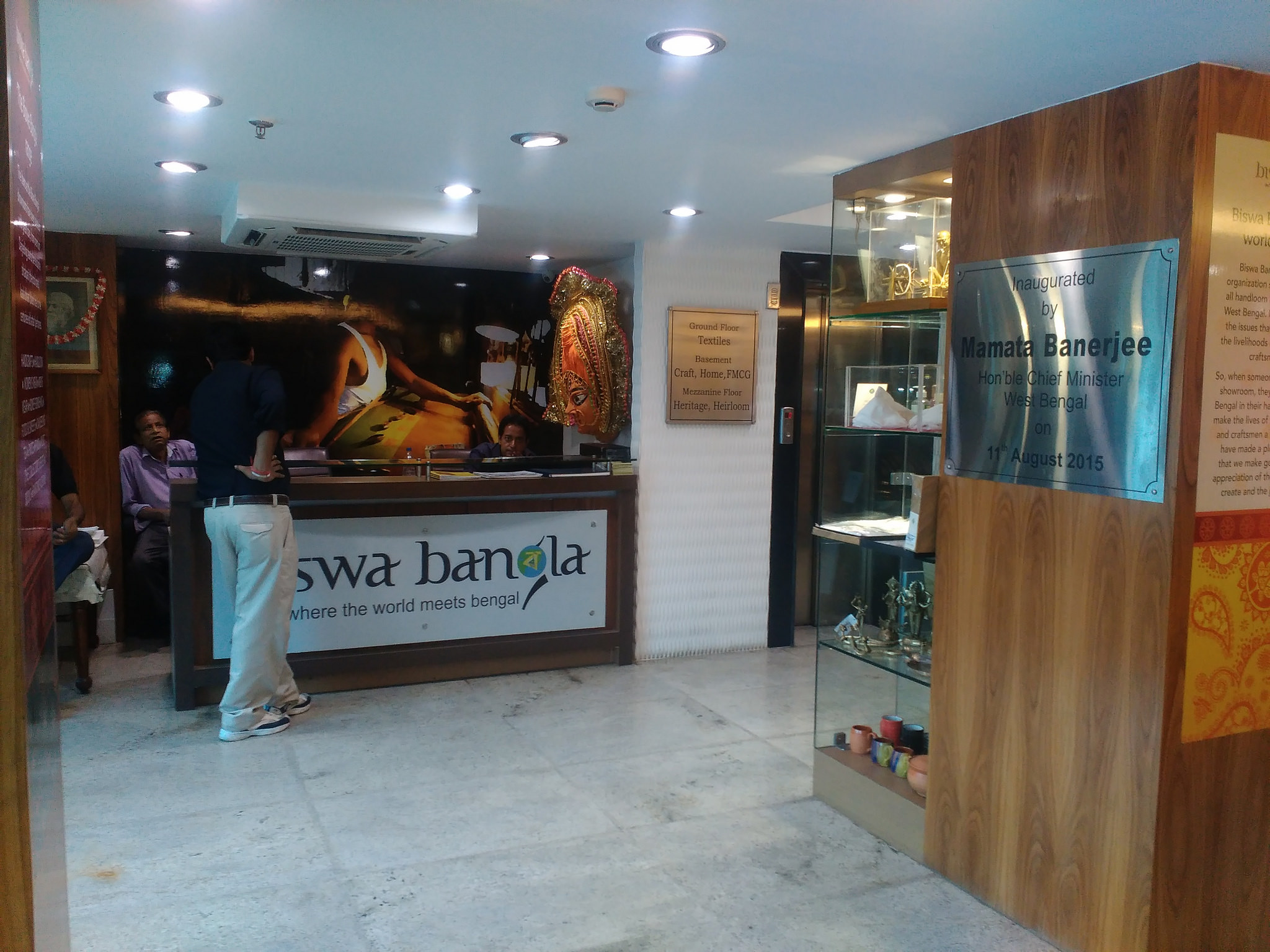
Biswa Bangla, New Delhi

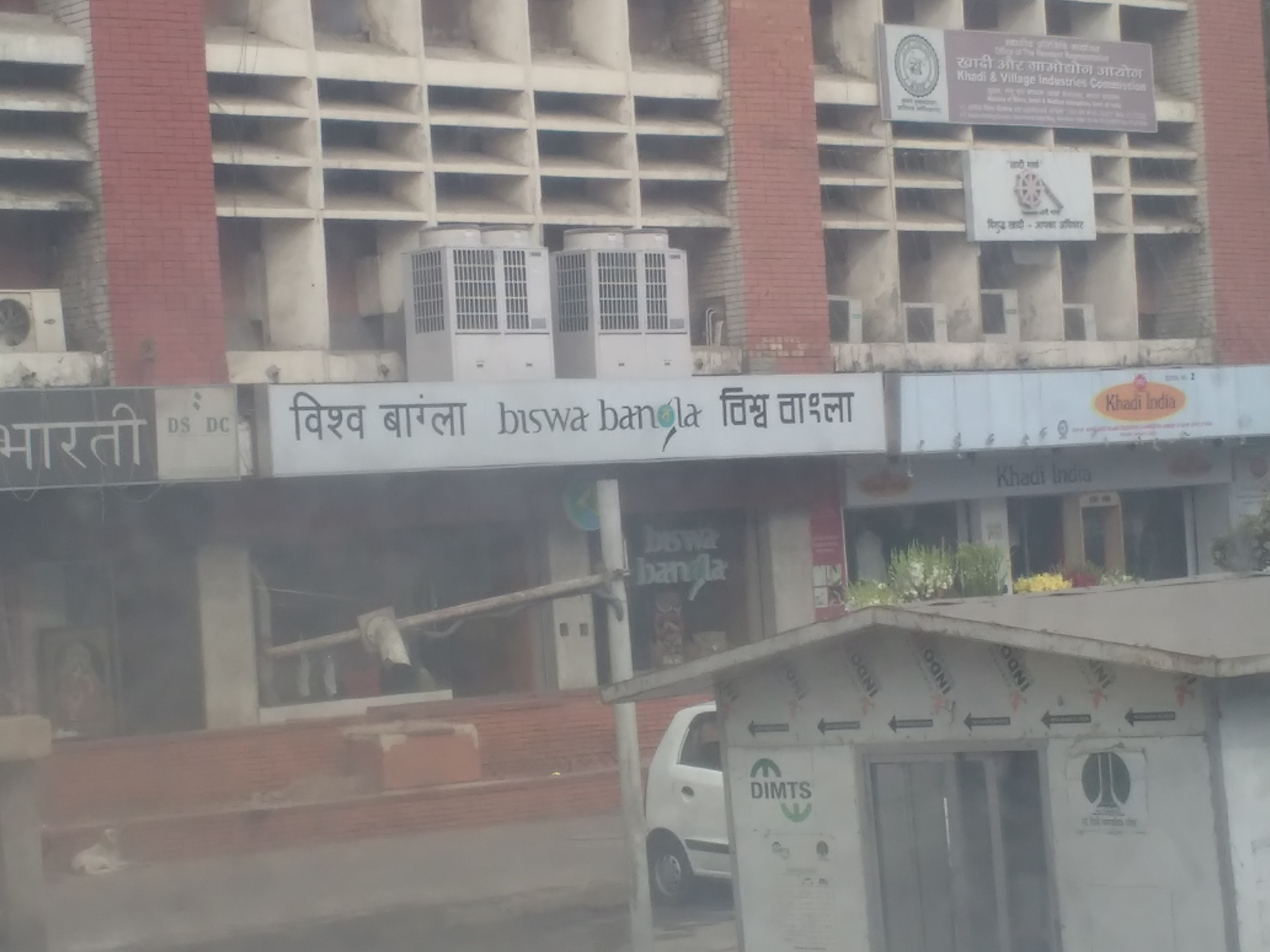
Biswa Bangla, New Delhi

There are seven Biswa Bangla showrooms, most of them concentrated in West Bengal, one in Darjeeling and Bagdogra and one located in New Delhi.

=== Further expansion ===
There are plans to take the presence of the stores beyond India to countries such as England, United States and China.
