= Jamdani =

Traditional weaving art of Bangladesh

- Jamdani Saris in historic Sonargaon city

Production area
- Country: Bangladesh
- Location: Narayanganj, Bangladesh

Details
- Ingredients: Cotton
- Style: Bengal tradition

Status

Traditional art of Jamdani weaving
- UNESCO Intangible Cultural Heritage
- Country: Bangladesh
- Reference: 00879
- Region: Asia and the Pacific

Inscription history
- Inscription: 2013 (8th session)
- List: Representative

Jamdani (Bengali: জামদানি) is a fine muslin textile (figured with different patterns) produced for centuries in South Rupshi of Narayanganj district in Bangladesh on the bank of Shitalakshya River.

The historic production of jamdani was patronized by imperial warrants of the Mughal emperors. During the period of British rule in India, Bengal's jamdani and muslin industries rapidly declined due to being unable to compete with imported textiles manufactured in Great Britain. In more recent years, the production of jamdani has witnessed a revival in Bangladesh. Jamdani involved skilful use of white, black, golden, silver and other similar coloured threads to weave geometric and floral patterns into the fabric.

In 2013, the traditional art of weaving jamdani was declared a UNESCO Intangible Cultural Heritage of Humanity.

In 2016, Bangladesh received geographical indication (GI) status for Jamdani Sari.

== Etymology ==
Jamdani was originally known as Dhakai (Daccai) named after the city of Dhaka (Dacca), one of many ancient textile weaving centers in Bengal region. Under the Mughal Empire the Persian term Jamdani came to be in popular use, since it was the court language of the Mughals. Jamdanis are popularly known as Dhakai Jamdani or simply Dhakai. The earliest mention of jamdani and its development as an industry is found into Dhaka, Bangladesh.

== Origin ==
An early reference to Indian origins of muslin is found in the book of Periplus of the Erythraean Sea and in the accounts of Arab, Chinese and Italian travelers and traders.

Jamdani is a hand loom woven fabric made of cotton, which was historically referred to as muslin. The Jamdani weaving tradition is of Bengali origin. It is one of the most time and labor-intensive forms of hand loom weaving, and is considered one of the finest varieties of muslin, and the most artistic textile of Bangladeshi weavers. Traditionally woven around Dhaka and created on the loom brocade, jamdani is rich in motifs. In the late 19th century, T. N. Mukharji referred to this fabric as jamdani muslin.

== Weave ==
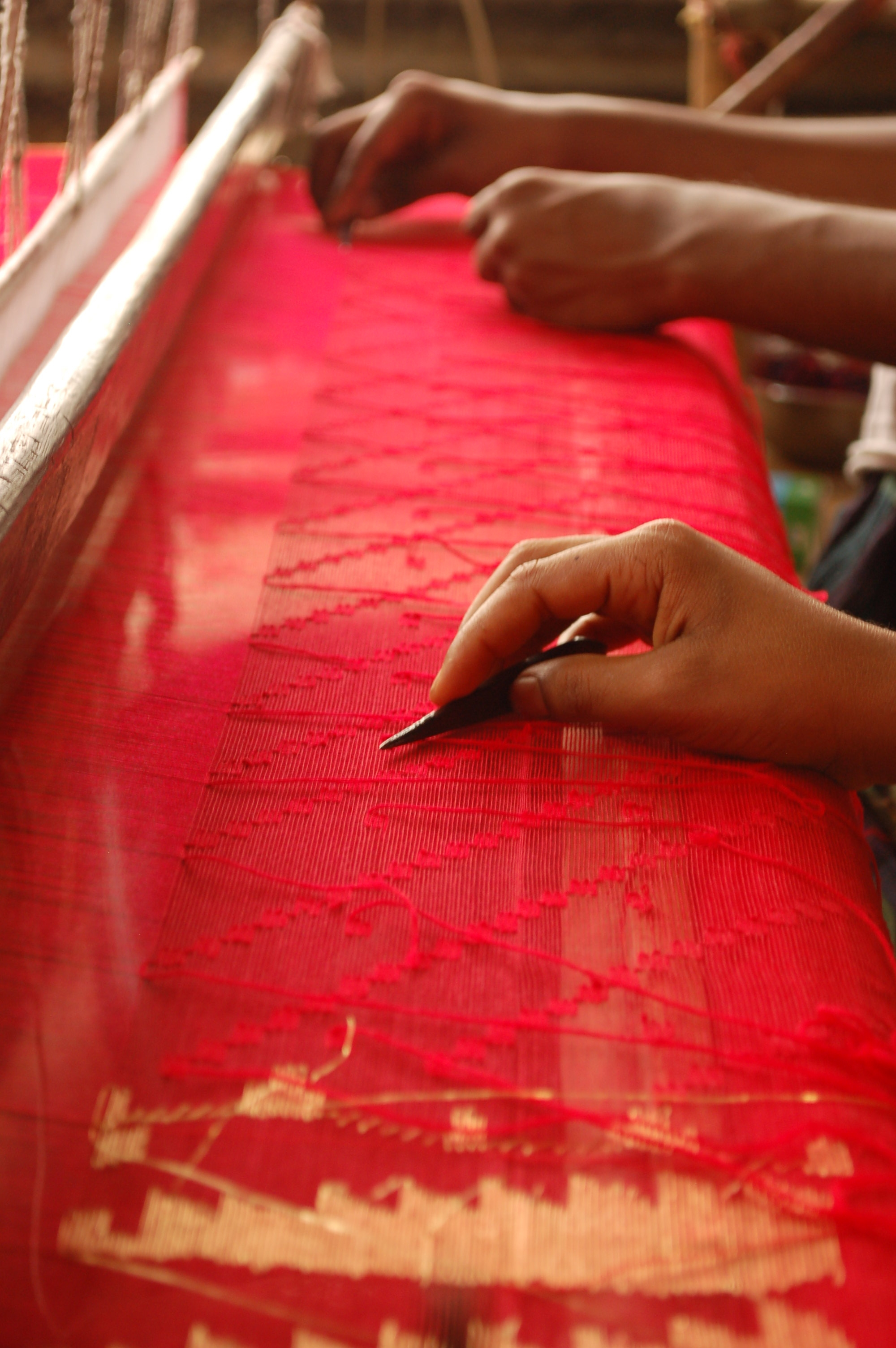
Traditional way of weaving jamdani

Whether figured or flowered, jamdani is a woven fabric in cotton. This is a supplementary weft technique of weaving, where the artistic motifs are produced by a non-structural weft, in addition to the standard weft that holds the warp threads together. The standard weft creates a fine, sheer fabric while the supplementary weft with thicker threads adds the intricate patterns to it. Each supplementary weft motif is added separately by hand by interlacing the weft threads into the warp with fine bamboo sticks using individual spools of thread. The result is a complex mix of different patterns that appear to float on a shimmering surface. The pattern is not sketched or outlined on the fabric, but is drawn on a graph paper and placed underneath the warp. Jamdani is a fine muslin cloth on which decorative motifs are woven on the loom, typically in grey and white. Often a mixture of cotton and gold thread was used.

== Varieties of jamdani work ==
Though mostly used for saris, Jamdani is also used for scarves and handkerchiefs. Jamdani is believed to be a fusion of the ancient cloth-making techniques of Bengal (possibly 2,000 years old). Jamdani is the most expensive product of Dhaka looms since it requires the most lengthy and dedicated work.

Jamdani patterns are mostly of geometric, plant, and floral designs and are said to have originated thousands of years ago. Due to the exquisite painstaking methodology required, only aristocrats and royal families were able to afford such luxuries.

== Changes with time ==
We do not know exactly when jamdani came to be adorned with floral patterns of the loom. It is, however, certain that in the Mughal period, most likely during the reign of either Emperor Akbar (1556–1605) or Emperor Jahangir (1605–1627), the figured or flowered muslin came to be known as the jamdani. John Forbes Watson in his work titled Textile Manufactures and Costumes of the people of India holds that the figured muslin because of their complicated designs, were always considered the most expensive productions of the Dhaka looms. The price for a piece was recorded as 56 Livre in 1776.

== Decline and fall ==
From the middle of the 19th century, there was a gradual decline in the jamdani industry. A number of factors contributed to this decline. The subsequent import of lower quality, but cheaper yarn from Europe, started the decline. Most importantly, the decline of Mughal power in India, deprived the producers of jamdani of their most influential patrons. Villages like Madhurapur and Jangalbari, (both in the Kishoreganj district), once famous for the jamdani industry went into gradual oblivion.

== Current problems ==
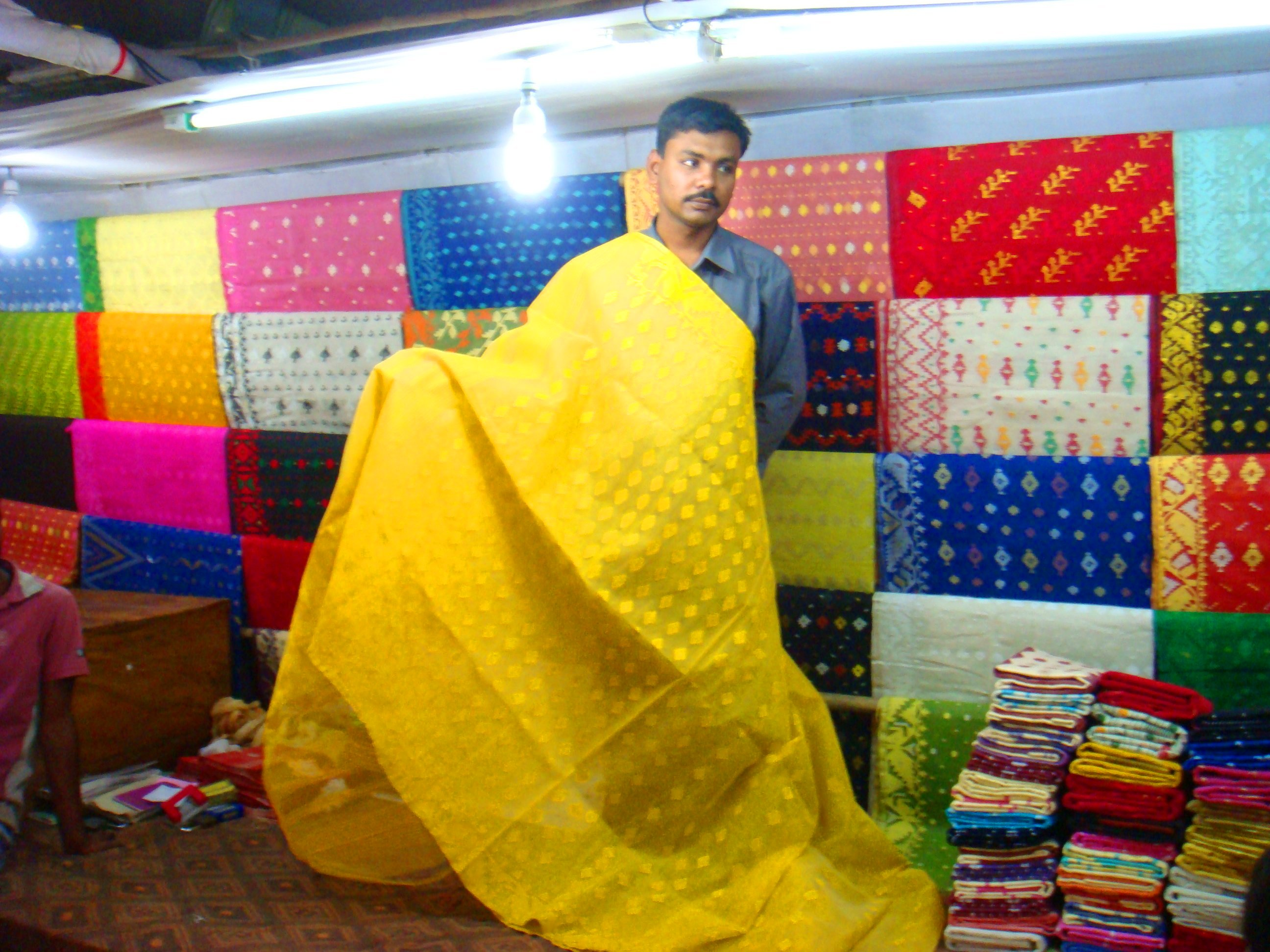
Jamdani Sari for sale in Sonargaon, Bangladesh

According to a national daily, a senior taanti or "ostad" earns about Tk 2,500 to Tk 3,000 per month. Junior weavers get much less, around Tk 1,600. As a result, many weavers do not want their children to come to the profession, preferring the more lucrative garments industry.

The government and other organizations are trying to revive the old glory of Dhakai Jamdani. In a bid to avoid the middlemen, they are trying to establish direct contact with the weavers. A Jamdani Palli has been established near Dhaka. Jamdani, one of the oldest forms of cottage industry in Bangladesh, was once a dying trade. Organizations like Radiant Institute of Design, Shanto Mariam University of creative technology, National Institute of Design, and others are helping designers create new Jamdani designs.

Jamdani is a symbol of aristocracy. The demand for quality Jamdani Sarees has increased greatly over the years.

== Geographical indication ==
In 2016, Bangladesh received geographical indication (GI) status for Jamdani Sari. It was the first GI status given to any Bangladeshi product.

== Recent attempts at revival ==
Whilst the art of jamdani is on the decline due to current problems such as competition with cheaper and more lucrative clothing as well as lack of suitable remuneration for weavers. However, there have been a few encouraging signs in recent times.

For instance, the Indian government awarded master weaver of Jamdani saris, Biren Kumar Basak from West Bengal with the Padma Shri award, which is the fourth highest civilian award in the country. Biren Kumar Basak also hailed the award and recognition of his work by Prime Minister Modi as a good sign for the future of the Jamdani community in Bengal.

Exhibitions such as the Jamdani Festival of Wearable Art curated by Chandra Shekhar Shaha was held in July 2023 in Bangladesh in collaboration with the National Crafts Council of Bangladesh to illustrate sustainably produced and hand-woven jamdani saris.

Moreover, brands such as TARINA by designer Tarina Sen are attempting to preserve the traditional crafts of jamdani by creating contemporary clothes. Labels such as TARINA are striving to help jamdani weavers in West Bengal and Odisha by reaching new markets, consisting of the younger generation, by creating attractive clothes that presents a harmony of modern and traditional designs.

== Weaving process ==
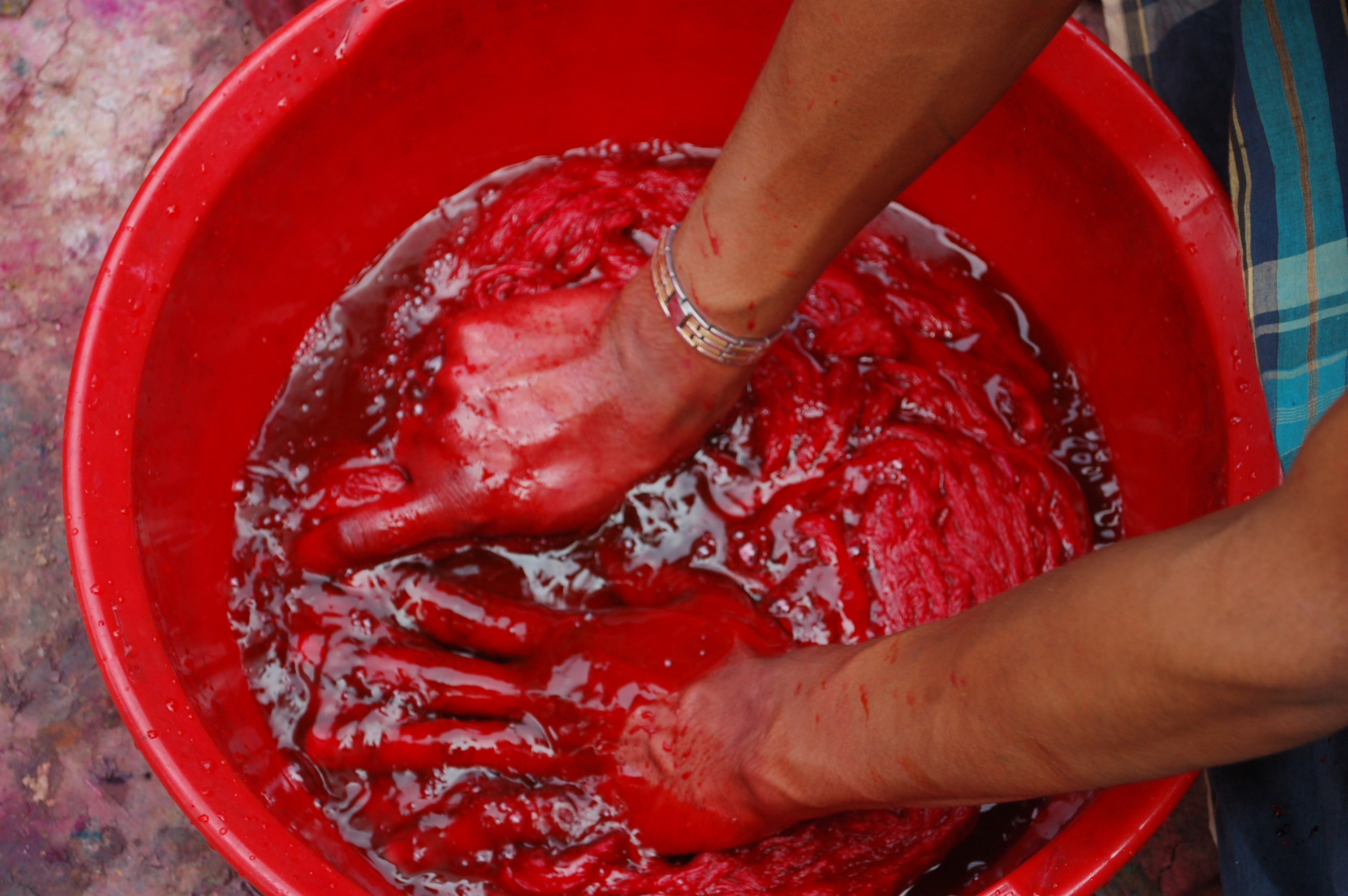
Step 1: Yarn prepared from thread bundles is dyed

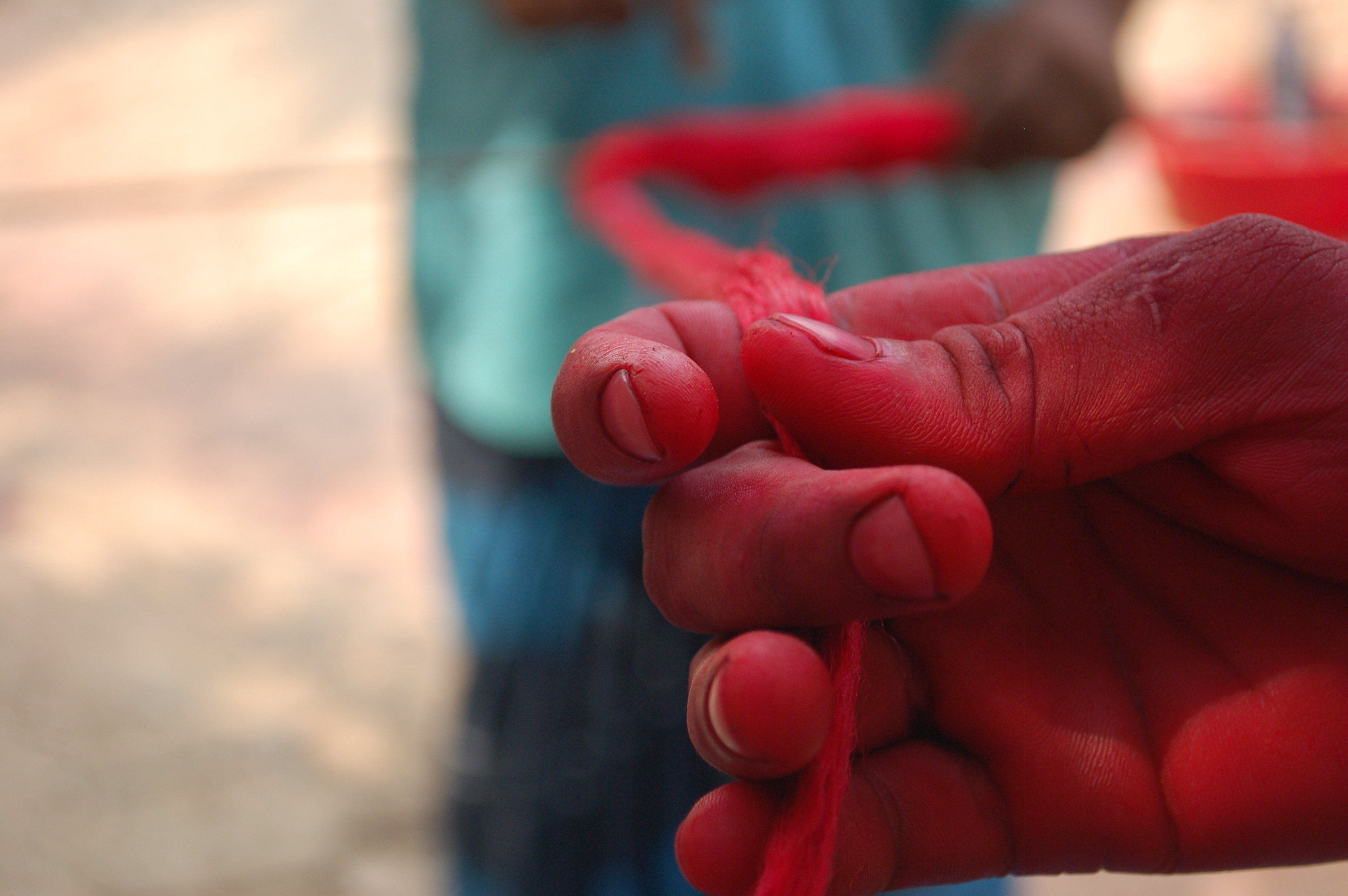
Step 2: The dyed yarn is prepared for weaving

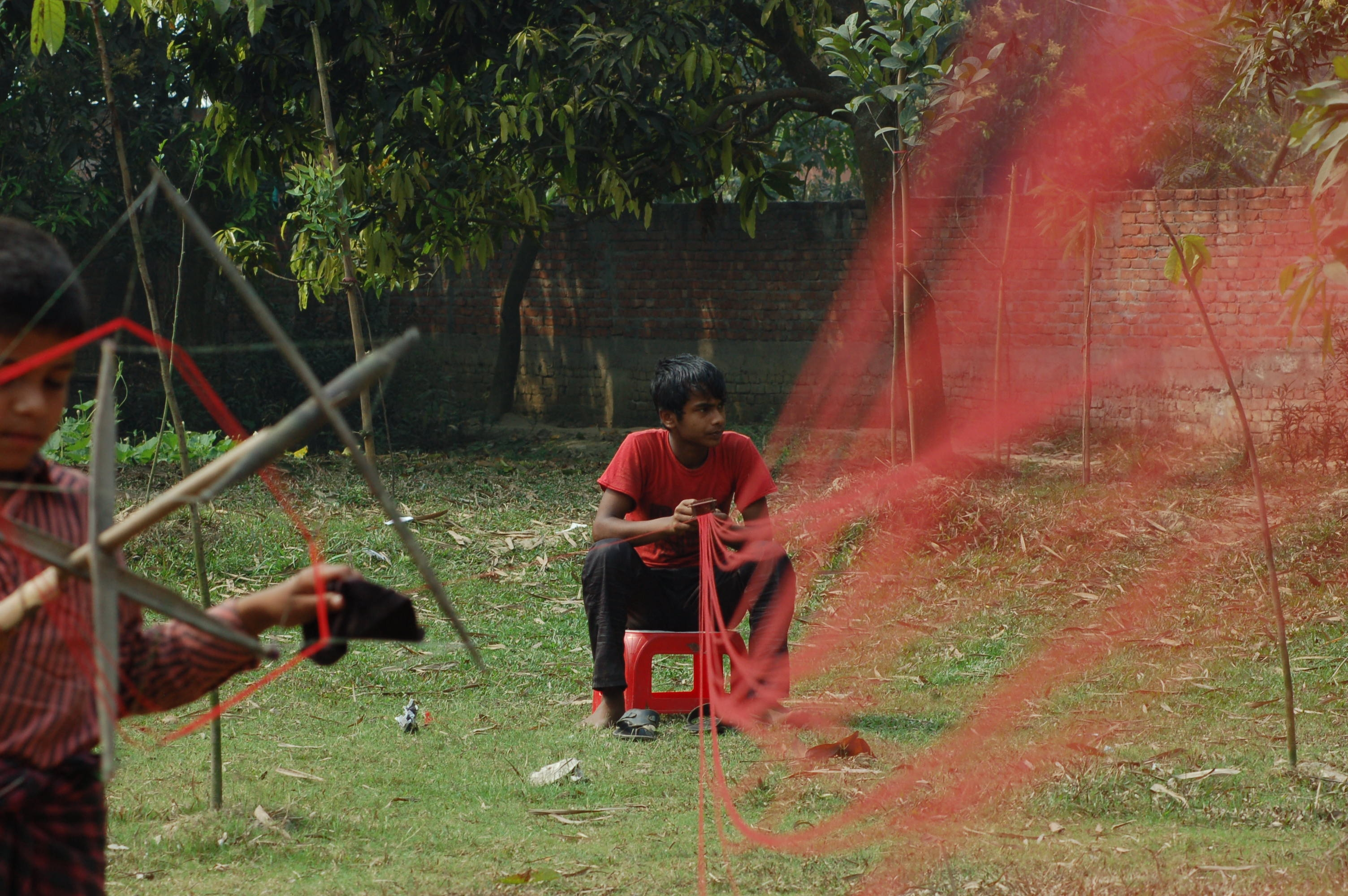
Step 3: The yarn is starched with rice starch and dried in several stages to strengthen it

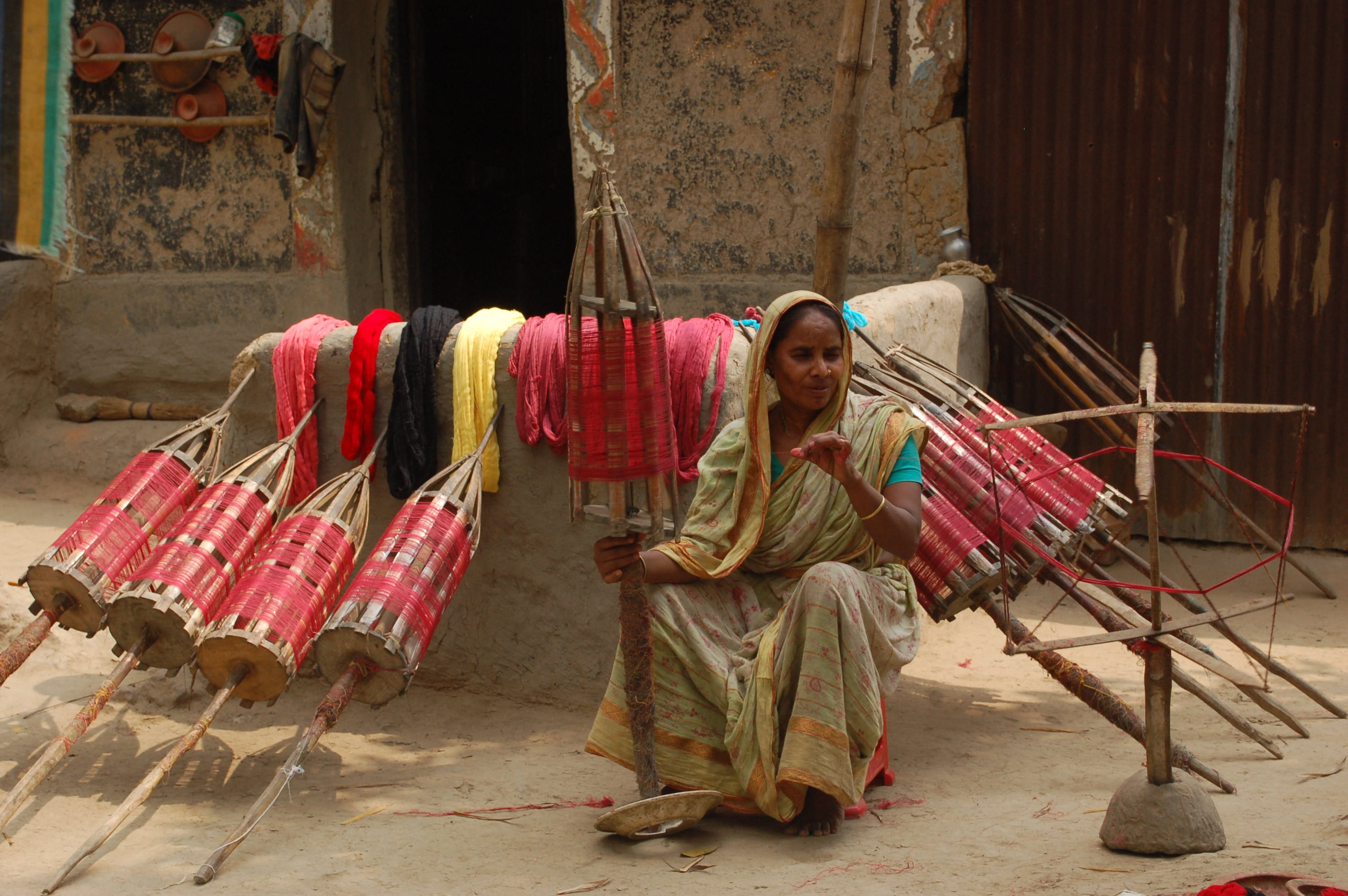
Step 4: The sun-dried yarn is prepared for mounting on the loom

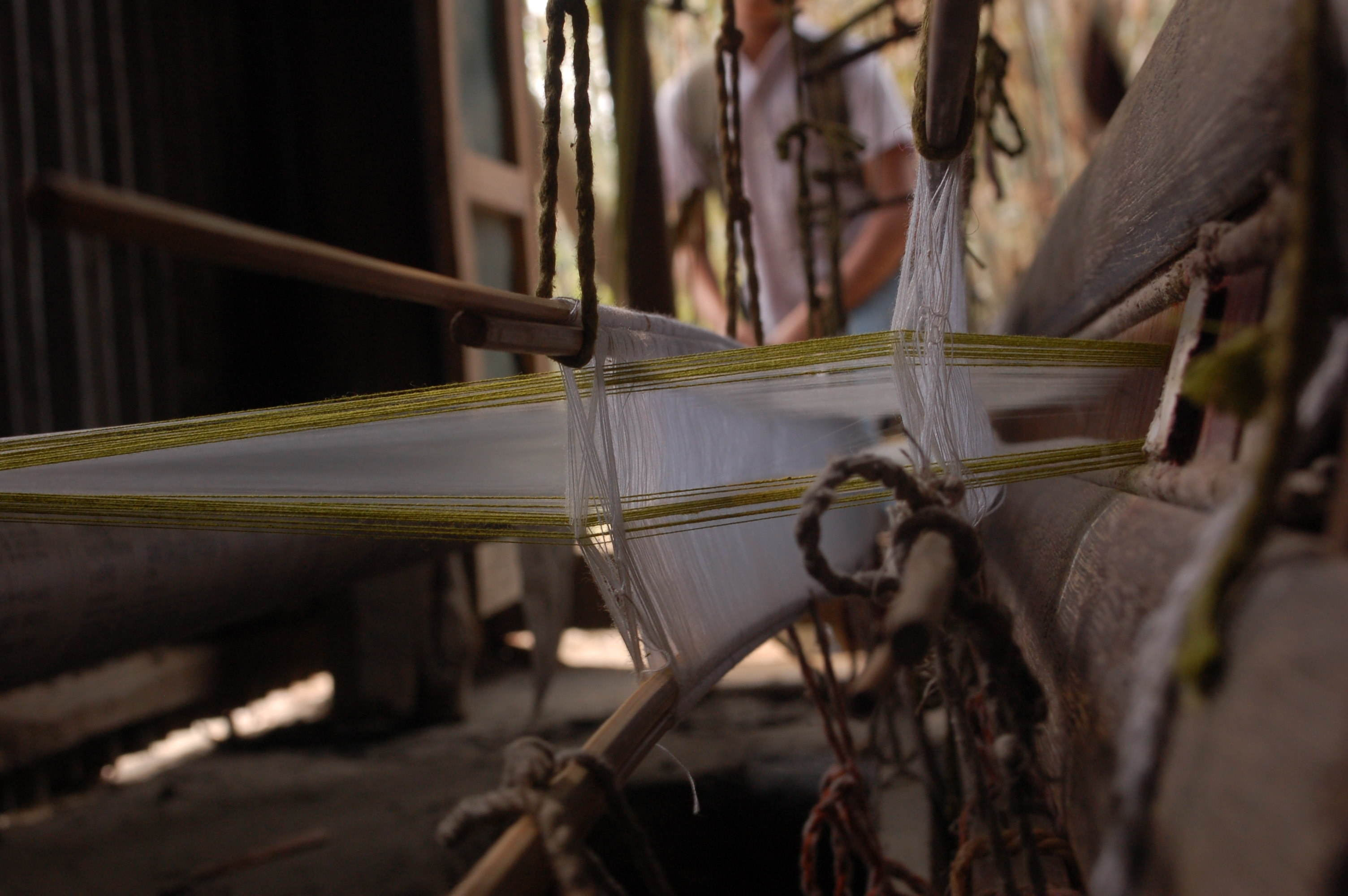
Step 5: The sari is woven on a traditional handloom, with coloured yarn used to create the motifs

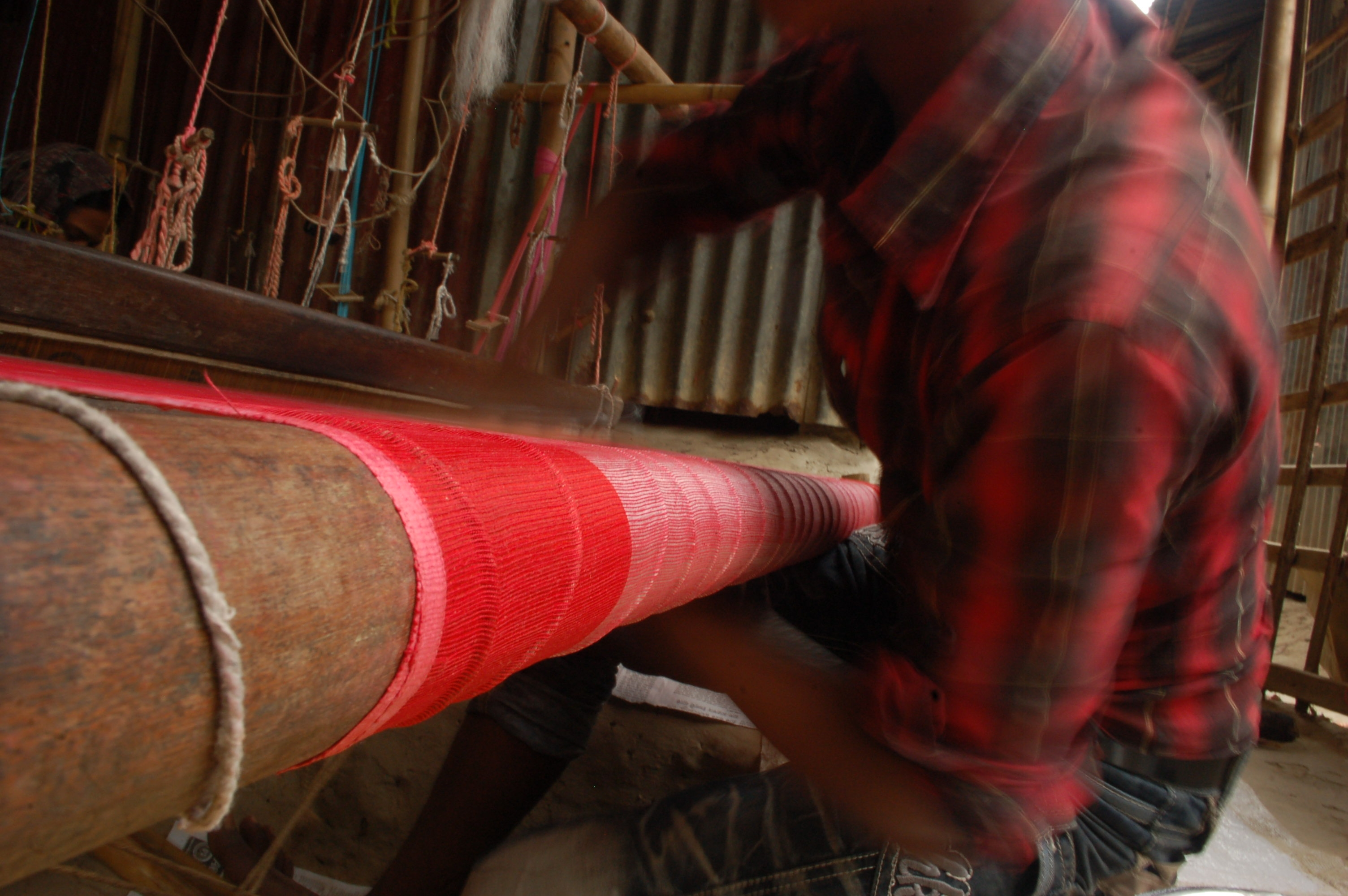
Step 6: Rice starch is applied once more during the weaving process

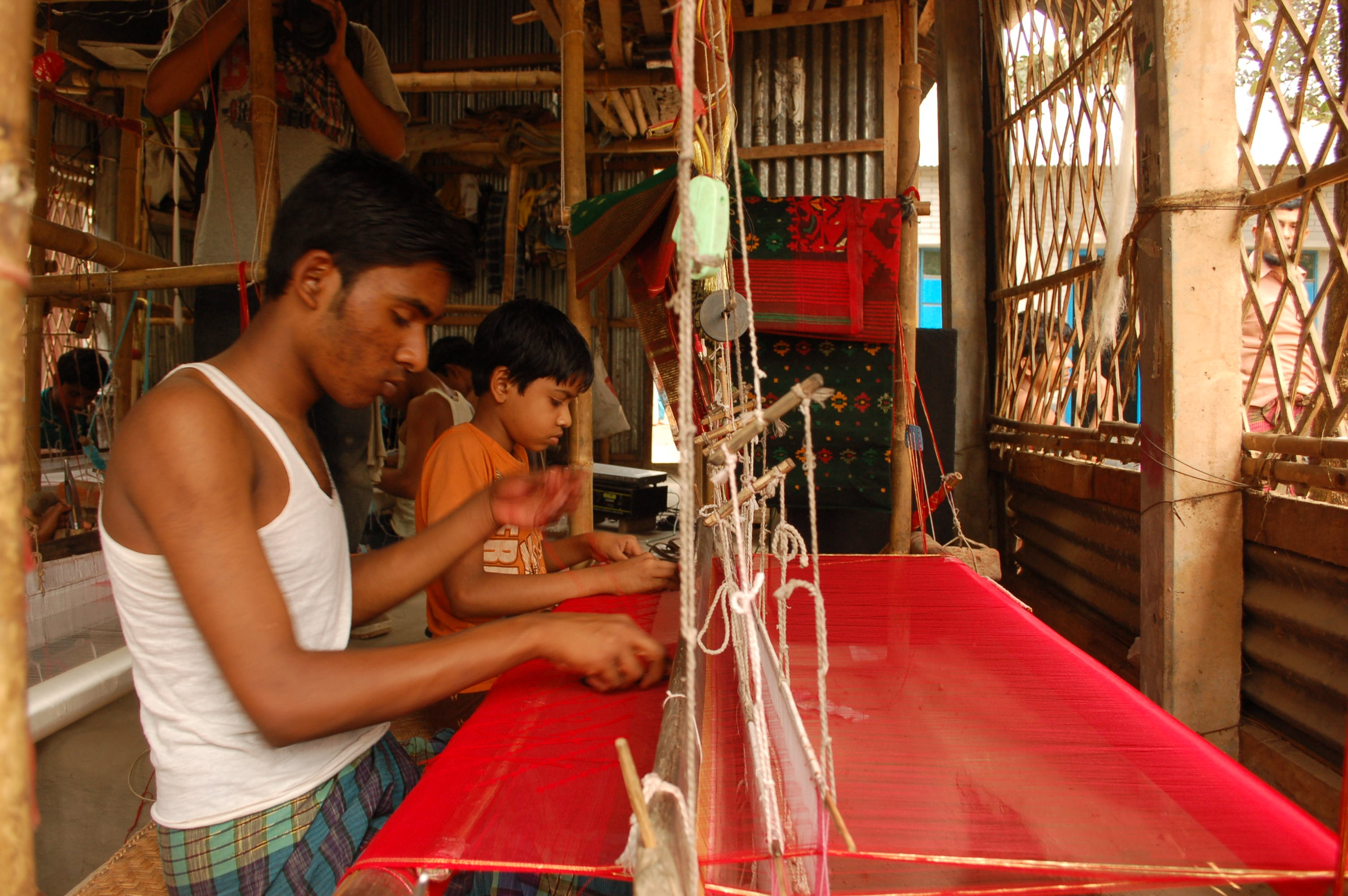
Step 7: The weaving of the decorative motifs then begins

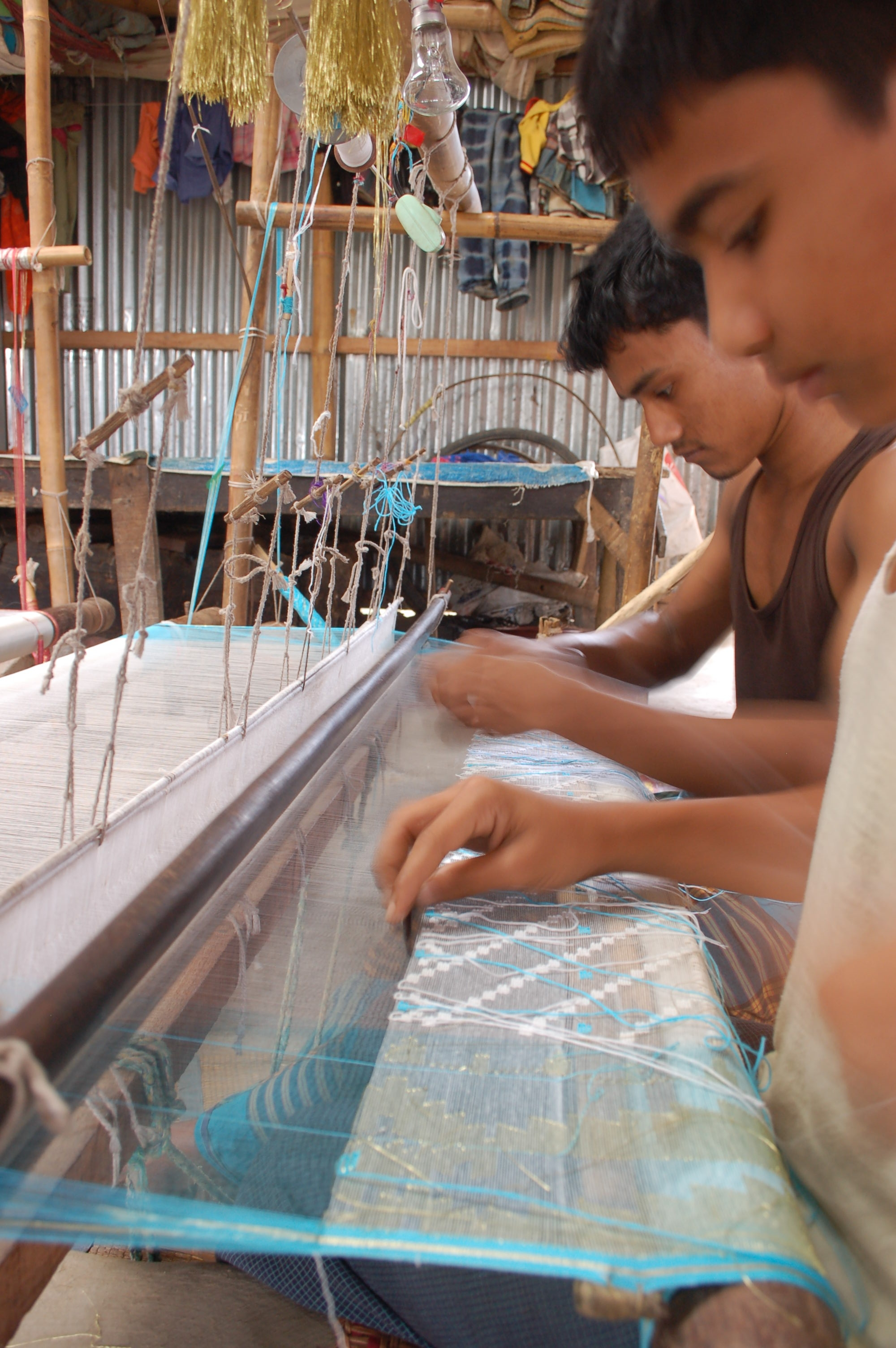
Step 8: The sari is completed with intricate motifs using yarns of various colours

== Images ==
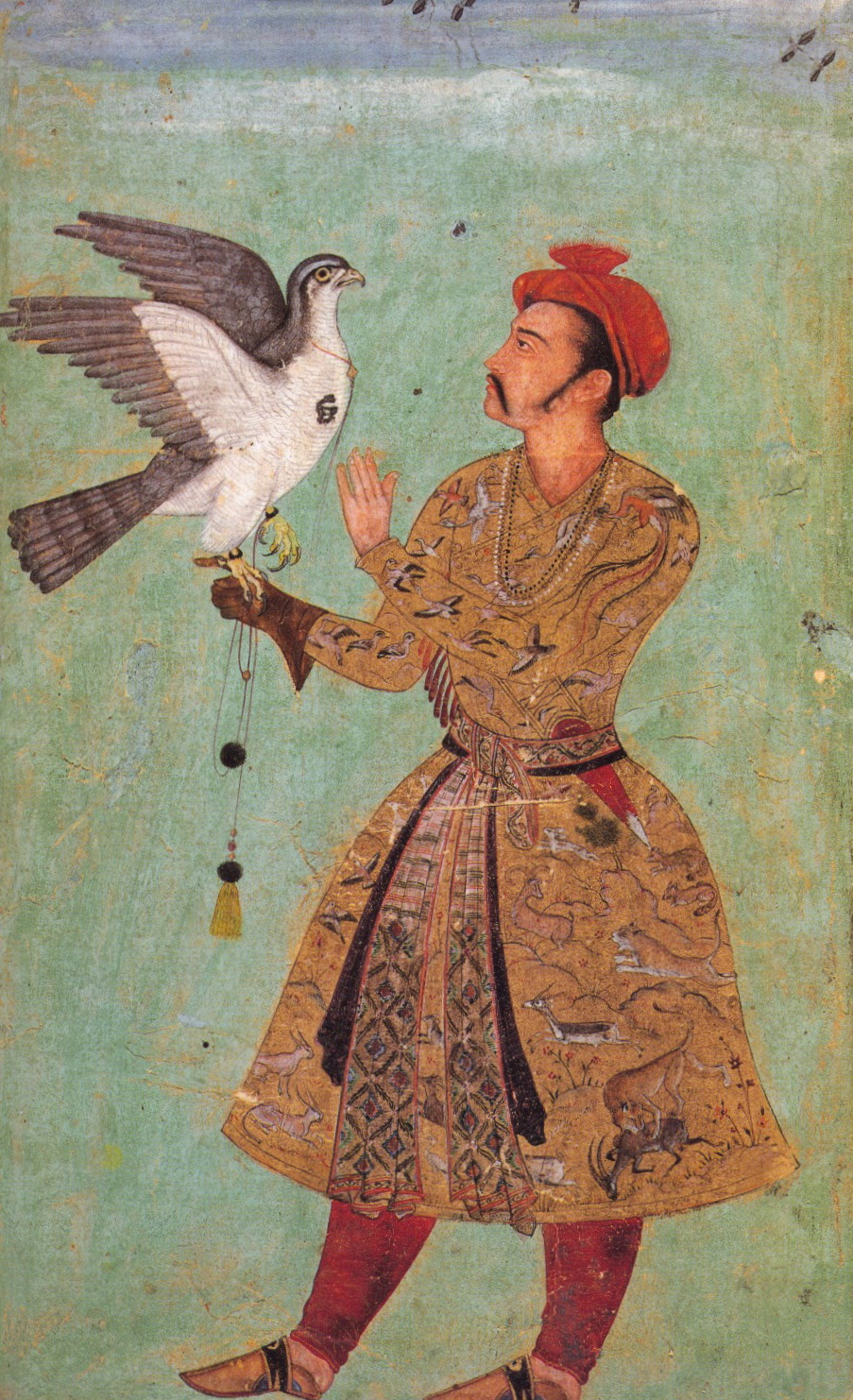
Mughal emperor Akbar wearing an imperial jamdani Sash

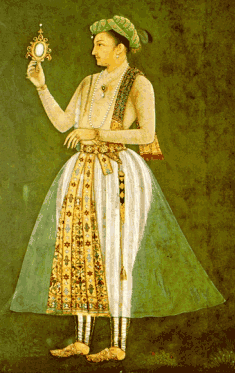
The young emperor Jahangir wearing an imperial jamdani Sash

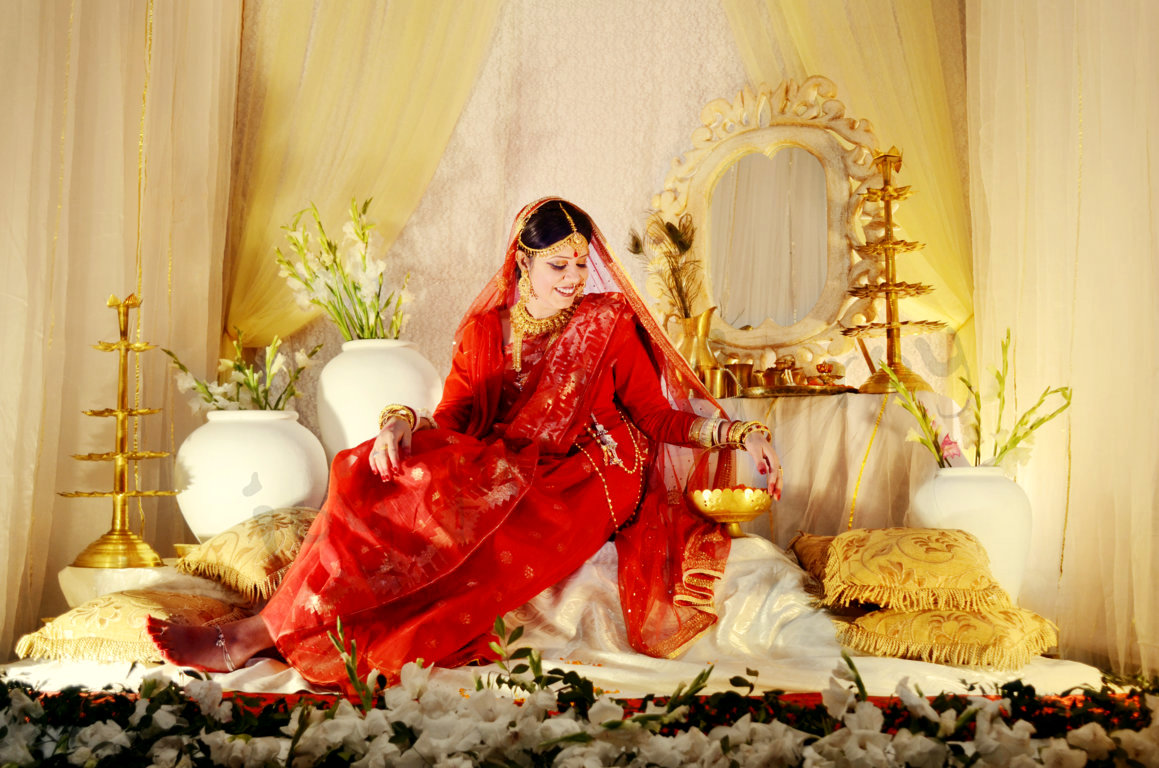
Bangladeshi bride in jamdani saree

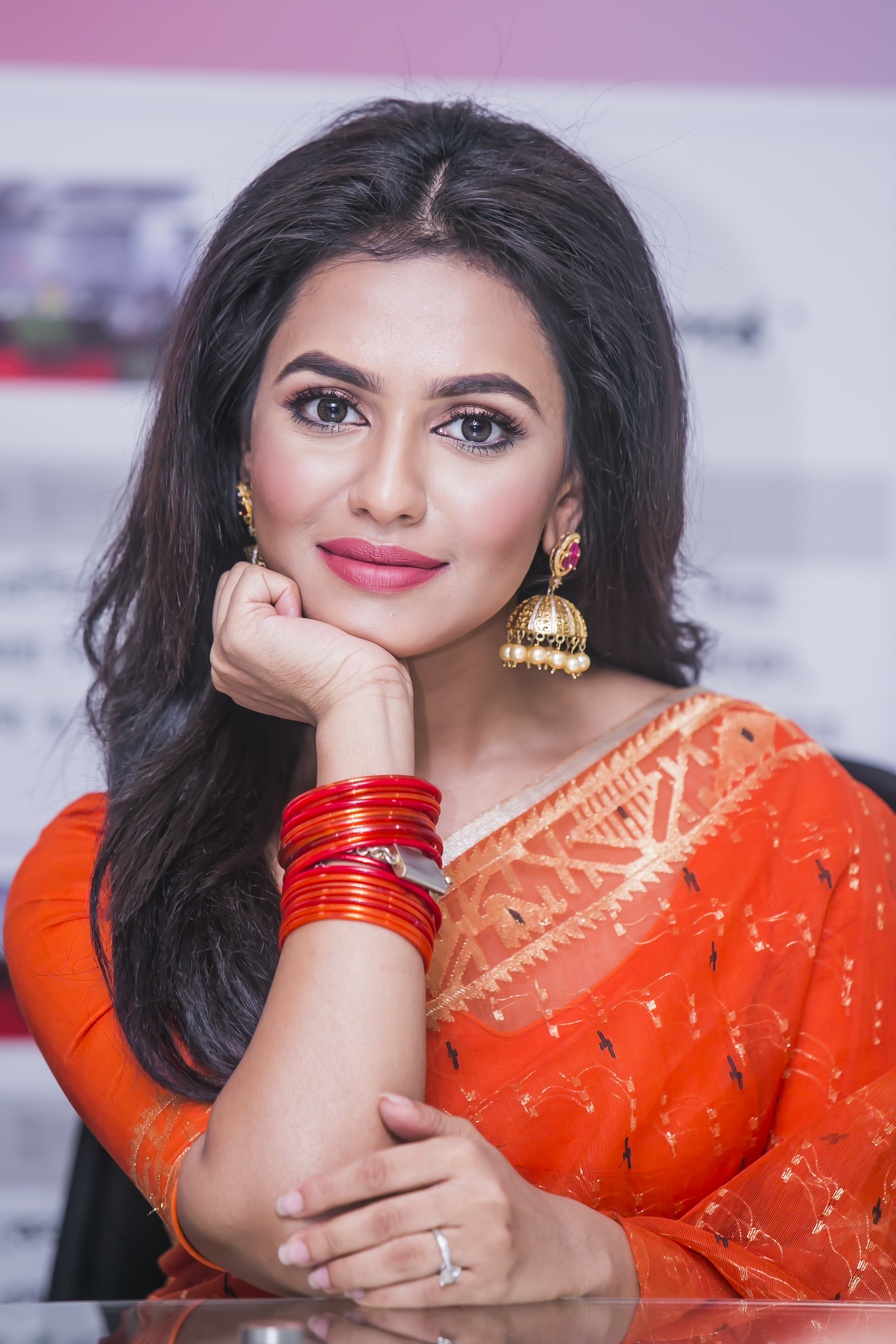
Bangladeshi actress Nusraat Faria in a red jamdani

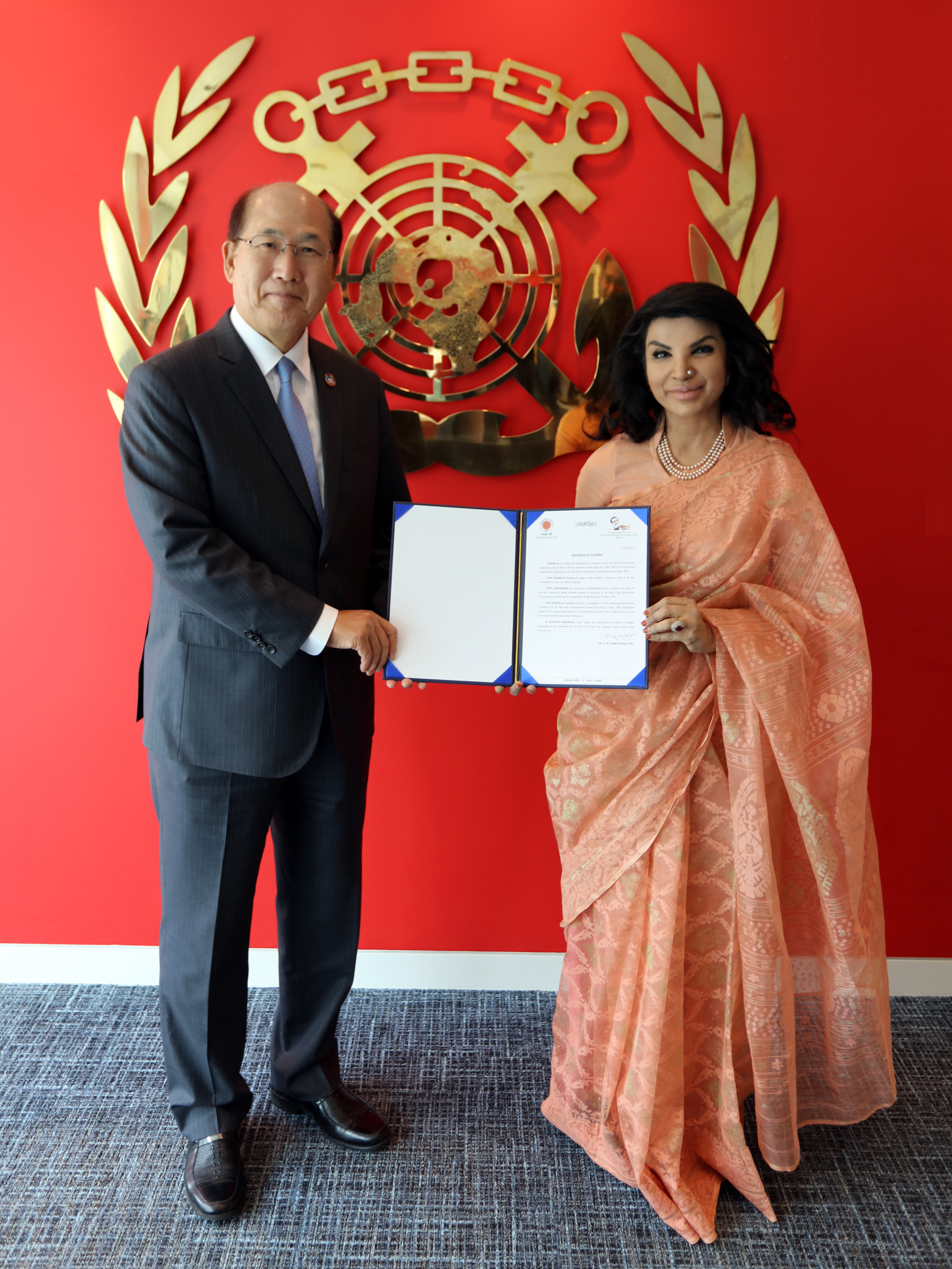
Saida Muna Tasneem high commissioner of Bangladesh to the United Kingdom.

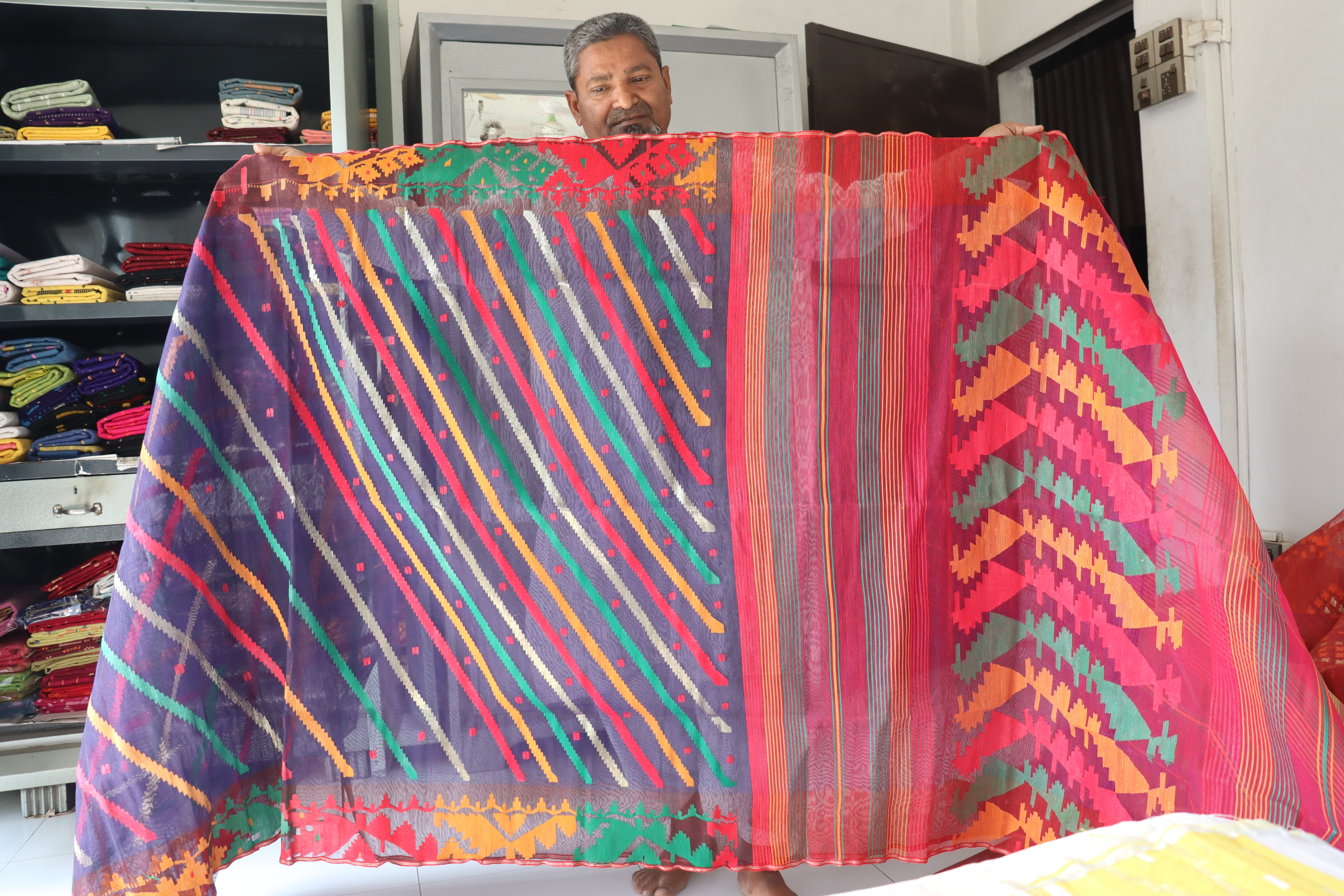
Seller displaying Jamdani saree in Narayanganj, Bangladesh.

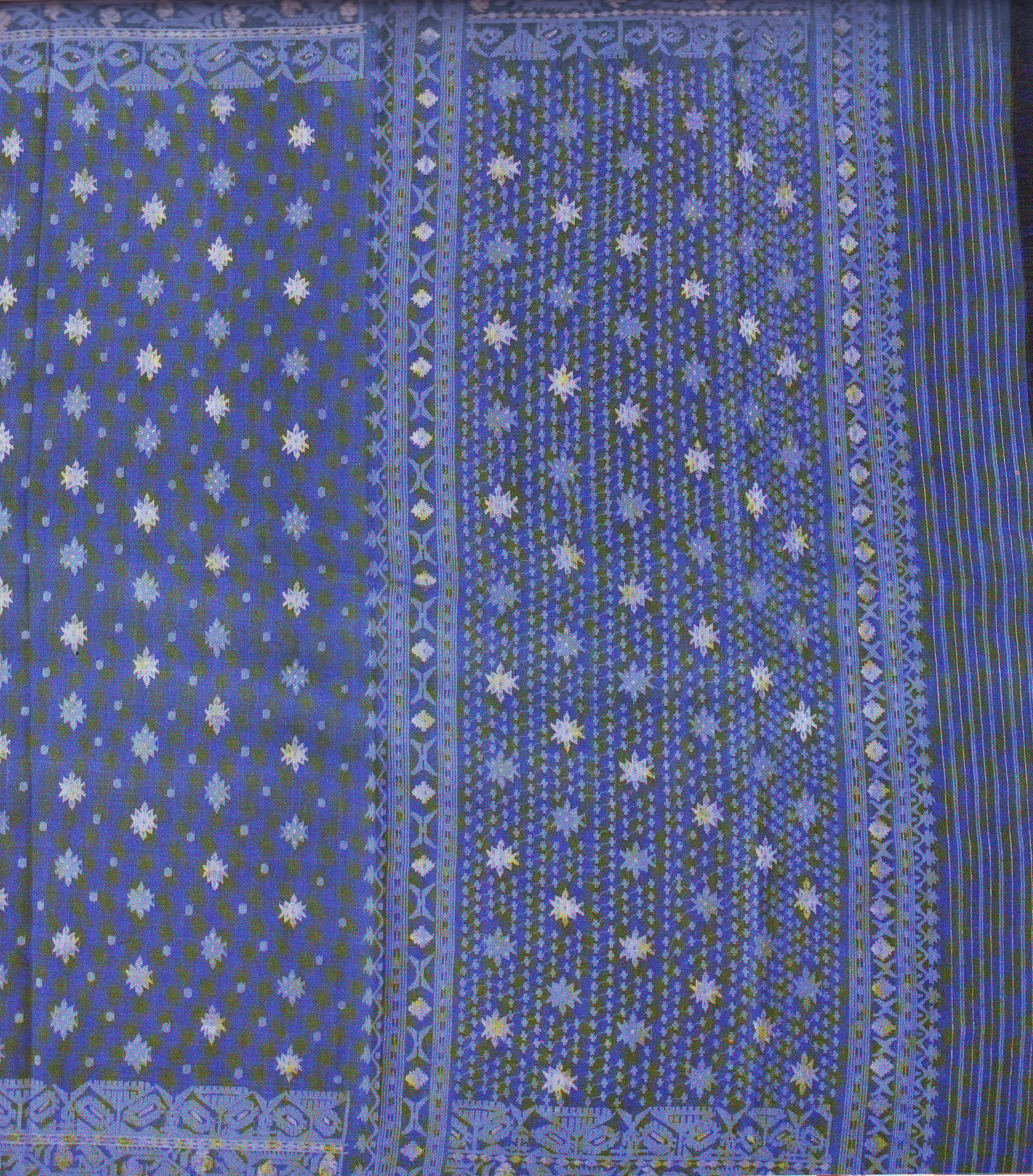
Blue Jamdani saree.

== See also ==
- Tangail Saree
