= West Bengal Handicrafts Development Corporation =

West Bengal Handicrafts Development Corporation popularly known as Manjusha is an agency of Government of West Bengal established in 1976, to develop, preserve and promote the rich tradition of exquisite craftsmanship of West Bengal. It is under the administrative control of Micro & Small Scale Enterprises and Textiles Department, Government of West Bengal.
