= Shantipuri sari =

Traditional handwoven cotton sari of West Bengal

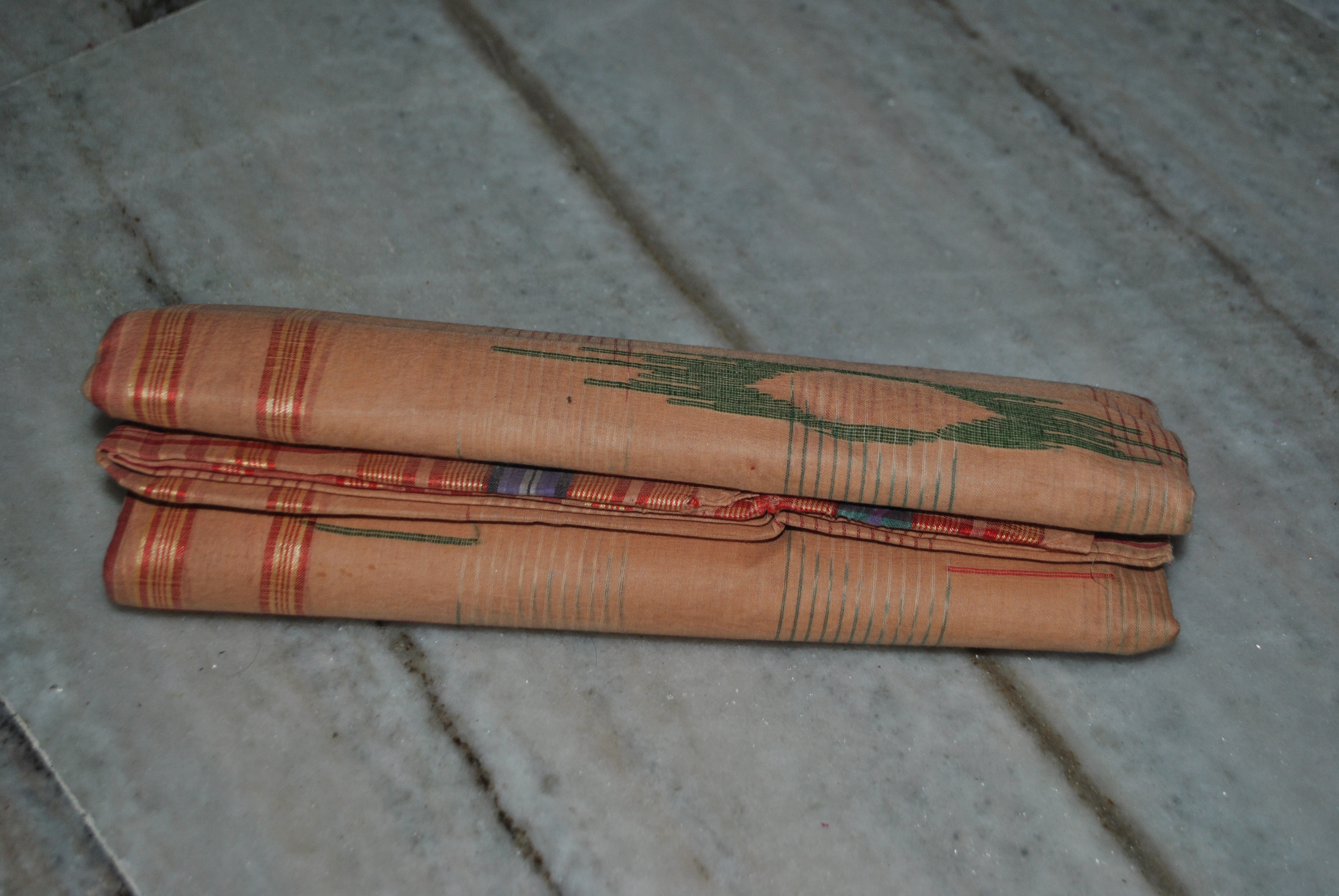
- Shantipuri sari with Guti Bhanj

Production area
- Country: India
- State: West Bengal
- Location: Shantipur

Details
- Origin Place: Shantipur, Nadia, West Bengal
- Ingredients: Cotton
- Length: 5.5 m.
- Breadth: 118-120 cm.
- Style: Bengal Tradition
- Borders: 5 inch to 6 inch
- Usage: Normal day life and Festival

Status
- GI Status: Registered
- Application No.: 138
- Website: Santipore Saree

Shantipuri sari (Bengali: শান্তিপুরী শাড়ি) is a traditional handwoven cotton sari of West Bengal. It is produced in the Shantipur city and surrounding area of Nadia district, West Bengal. Shantipuri handloom sari (or fabrics) is famous for the novelty of designs, hand spinning method with extra weft, different color patterns and the thin finesse of the fabric. The fine Shantipuri sari is a highly demanded commodity all over the world. Shantipuri Sari got geographical indications tag in 2009.

The specialty of Shantipur Sari is that it is marketed in a simple traditional fold form known as Guti Bhanj.

== Etymology ==
Textile weaving started in Shantipur from the first decade of the fifteenth century. Centuries ago, textile weaving was spread around Shantipur. Saris were one of the textiles that were woven here. Later the saris made in Shantipur came to be known as Shantipuri Sari. The word "Shantipuri" is derived from the textile center Shantipur.

== History ==
In the early fifteenth century, Weavers first settled in Shantipur during the reign of Raja Ganesha of Gauḍa in Bengal. The oldest date of Shantipur sari goes back to 1409 AD. According to records, the first saris were woven in Shantipur in 1409 AD during the reign of Gaur king Ganesh Danu Sadhandeb. The weaving tradition of Shantipur is recorded in the biographical manuscript of Sri Advaity Acharya (1460–1558) as Advaitya Mangal. During the reign of Nadia Raj Rudra Roy (1683–94) and during the Mughal rule handloom weaving of Shantipur emerged as a traditional industry. During the reign of Raja Rudra Raya (1683–94) of Nadia, the work of the weavers gained great acclaim and fame. At that time sarees were exported to Arabia, Greece, Turkey, Iran and Afghanistan. Thereafter, the industry came under the control of the East India Company until the Governor General came into existence. The products were mainly sari and dhoti, but specialty of Shantipur was in sari making. The weavers and sari of Shantipur were so famous that they actually found a place in Bengali folk literature.

The famous poet, lyricist and writer of the pre-independence age Dwijendralal Roy has also immortalized the beauty of Shantipuri Tant Sari (Bengali: শান্তিপুরের তাঁতের শাড়ি) in his poem.

Bengali script

ওই পরনে তার ডুরে শাড়ি মিহী
শান্তিপুরে ওই শান্তিপুরে ডুরে
রে ভাই শান্তিপুরের ডুরে।

English translation

There she wears the fine Dure of Shantipur,
The Striking Semblance of Dure of Shantipur,
Look Brother – That's the Dure of Shantipur.

In the early stages, the handloom fabrics produced in Shantipur consisted of handspun cotton yarn and was woven on throw-shuttle pit loom, the use of millspun yarn beginning in late 1824 AD. The barrel dobby was introduced by Darga Das Kastha during 1920–1925 AD and the throw shuttles were converted into fly shuttles. Devendranath Mukhopadhyay introduced the Jacquard machine, which widened the scope of designing from simple to complex and varied. Biren Kumar Basak, a weaver of Shantipur, received the Padma Shri in 2021 for his work.

== Method of production ==
=== Preparation of yarn ===
The process of weaving such a fine wonder saree starts from a very basic level of yarn cutting. The artisans take extreme care from the beginning to the end of the production process, as producing high quality sarees requires extra care. Materials used in Shantipuri saris are mainly cotton and silk. Cotton is first made into yarn by a spinning wheel. It is the main raw material of the sari.

The best quality yarn is taken, and is first steamrolled and ironed before being dyed in different colours. Then it is gradually expanded using a large wheel. Only after the weaver is fully satisfied about the quality of yarn does he proceed to use it on his loom by rolling it up in a multitude of bobbins.

=== Weaving ===
The bobbins are fitted in the loom in a sequential alternating pattern to achieve the variety of color patterns that is desired, but not the pattern of the anchal. The specialty of Shantipuri sari is that it uses 120-180 threads per inch and hence the textiles have a unique feel. The weaver begins his work after arranged the yarn in the loom; he uses a standard jacquard loom.

The earliest looms used in Shantipur for saree weaving were vertical warp-weighted looms, but today most looms are foot treadle floor looms.

== Specialties ==
Shantipur saree has several Specialties, which make it unique from all other saris.

1. The unique quality of doubling the number of threads through the reed (sana) – resulting in a unique tube mark on the saree. The thread count can be increased anywhere from 2-9 threads, with a higher thread count indicating a softer and shinier finish.
2. Shantipuri saris maintain the standard of 100x100 thread; this thread quality is rare in saris from anywhere else.
3. Shantipur's weavers discourage the removal of reed marks from their products during the process of giving the finishing touches to their products; this is the essential difference between Shantipuri and Phulia saris and creates a separate niche in the market for Shantipuri loom saris.

Apart from the three weaving Specialties mentioned above, there are several other design features. Namely - (a) the anchal (fall edge of the saree) of the sari is decorated with ribbons of varying thickness. These stripes, called Sajanshoi, have colors that complement the colors used in the borders. Some saris even include silver colored star patterns embroidered on the border, giving it a night sky look. (b) In fact this is why these saris have a very smooth texture and give the wearer a touch of sophistication, designs like the so-called 'diamond' section are still popular among rich and prestigious customers. (c) The weavers of Shantipur still work without any electrical tools and their secret lies in the manner they spread out the threads after making the textile, which gives it a characteristic identity.

== Variations ==
Shantipuri saris have multiple variations, and according to these variations the saris have different names. Depending on the design, color, pattern Shantipuri saris are named Nilambari, Ganga-jmuna, Benkipar, Bhomra, Rajmahal, Chandmalla, Anshpar, Brindavani Mour Par, Dorookha.
