= Handloom sari =

Sari woven by hand-operated loom

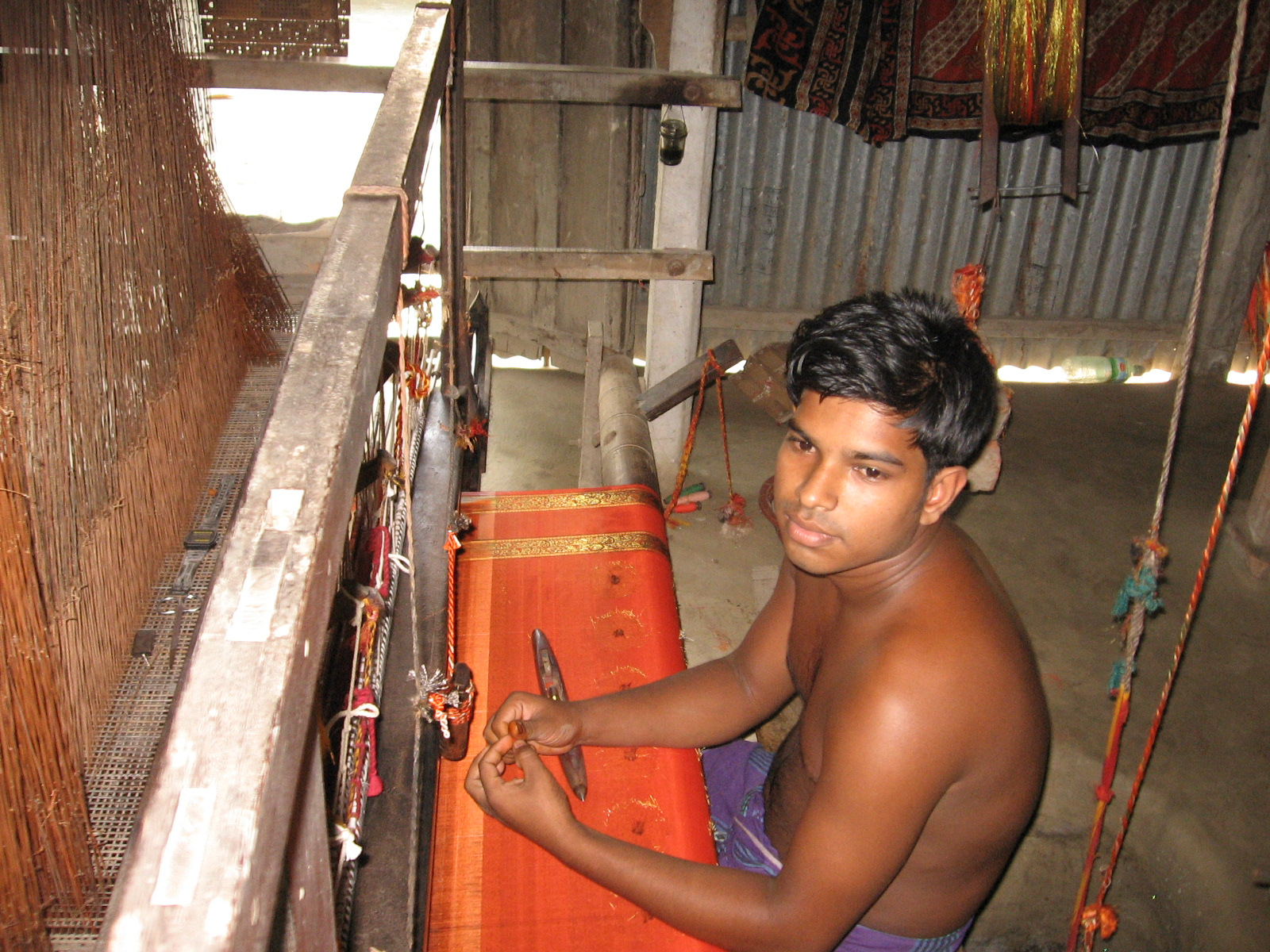
Tant sari weaving in Tangail. Tant Sari literally means "Handloom sari" in Bengali.

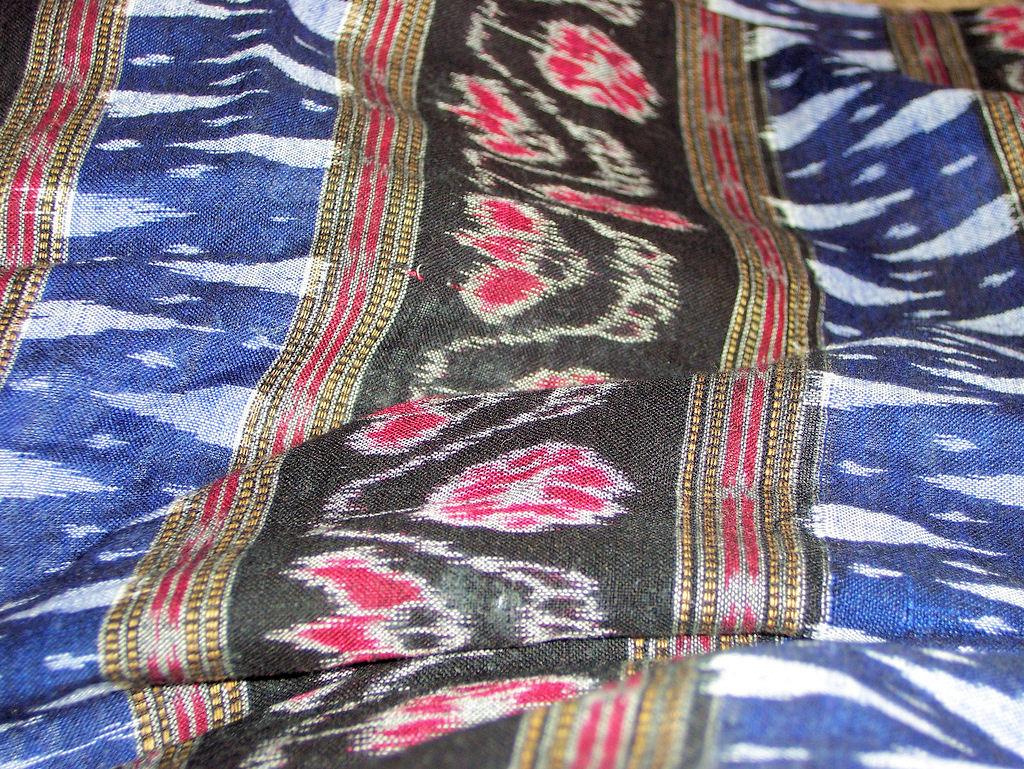
Handloom saris

Handloom saris are a traditional textile art of Bangladesh and India. The production of handloom saris is important for economic development in rural India.

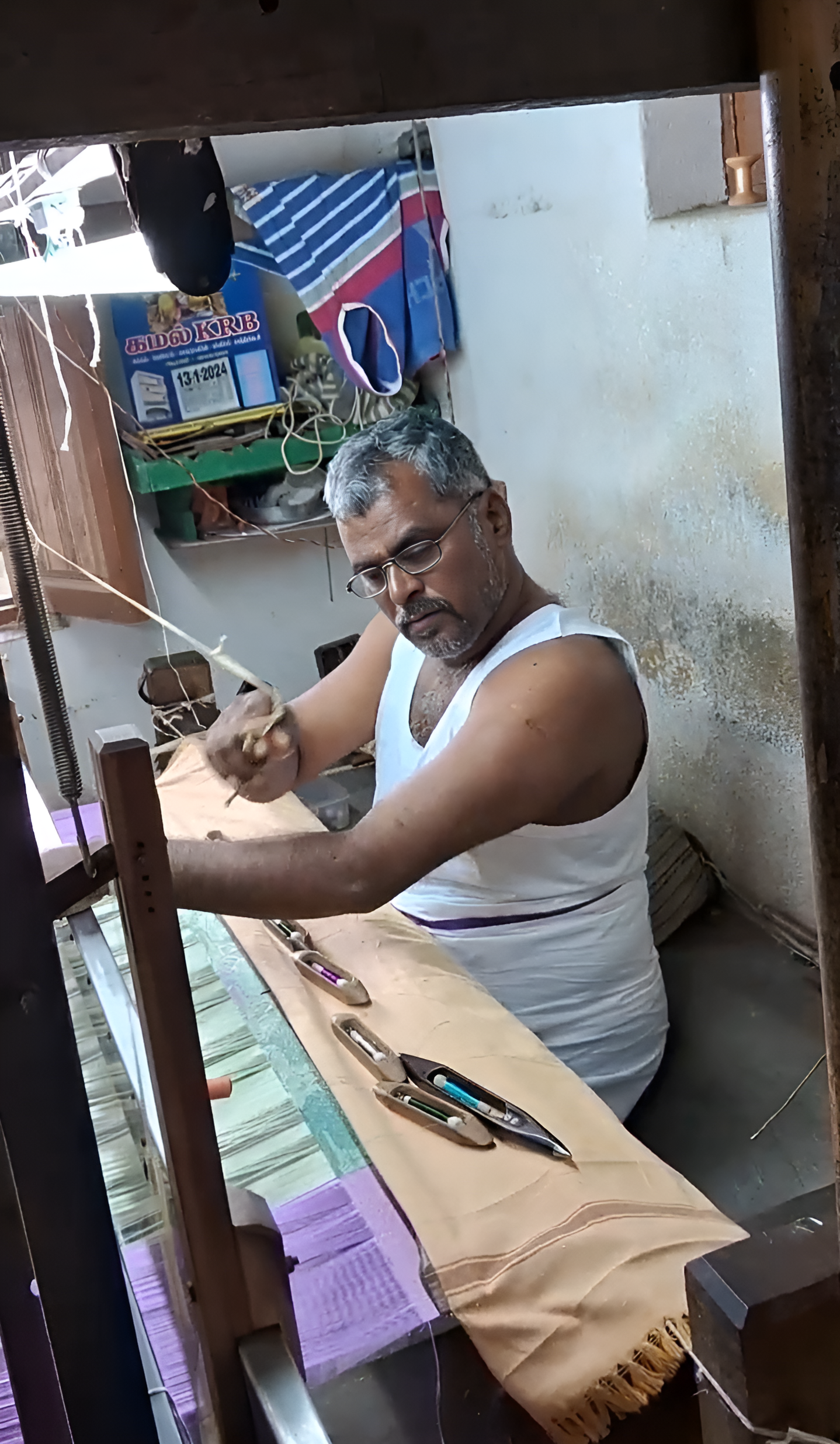
Handloom silk saree weaving in Arani, Tamilnadu

Completion of a single sari takes two to three days of work. Several regions have their own traditional styles of weaving handloom saris.

== The weaving process ==
A handloom sari is often woven on a shuttle-pit loom made from ropes, wooden beams and poles. The shuttle is thrown from side-to-side by the weaver. Other weavers use a fly-shuttle loom which can produce different types of patterns. The saris can vary in size and quality.

Handloom sari weaving is generally a family business and is one of India's cottage industries. The handloom saris are made from silk or cotton threads. The handloom weaving process requires several stages in order to produce the final product. Traditionally the processes of dyeing (during the yarn, fabric, or garment stage), warping, sizing, attaching the warp, weft winding and weaving were done by weavers and local specialists around weaving villages. However, currently most of the activities are outsourced.

== Major regional weaving traditions ==
Weaving takes place in many regions of India. Each region follows traditions for the motifs, designs and colours. Handloom weaving takes place in villages supporting lakhs (hundred thousands) of families for their livelihoods.

== Types of handloom saris ==
Tant sari is a traditional sari of Bangladesh. "Tant" means "Handloom" in Bengali language. Handloom industry in Tangail is famous for its Tangail saris which are also a type of Tant sari. Some of the well-known Indian handloom saris are Kanchipuram silk saris, Maheshwari saris, Bagh print saris, Chanderi silk saris, Tussar silk saris, Banarasi silk saris, Baluchuri saris, Sambalpuri saris, Kantha stitch saris, Bandhani saris and Munga saris.Munga saris, and Narayanpet handloom saris, which are known for their checkered patterns and temple-style borders.” Some handloom saris are made out of high-quality silk fabric, which is valued for its lustre.

=== Tant sari ===
Tant saris are one of the earliest sari weaving techniques. It is the most common cloth used by Bengali women. Bengal Tant handlooms especially thrived during the Mughal period in Dhaka and Sonargaon, where it received immense support from the royalty with muslin and jamdani which are now a Intangible cultural heritage as well as Gi products of Bangladesh.

=== Tangail saris ===
Tangail weaving stands as one of Bangladesh's oldest cottage industries, with Tangail weave sarees gaining global appreciation. Handloom sarees from Tangail are known for their fine count and intricate patterns, with extra warp designs using coloured yarn.

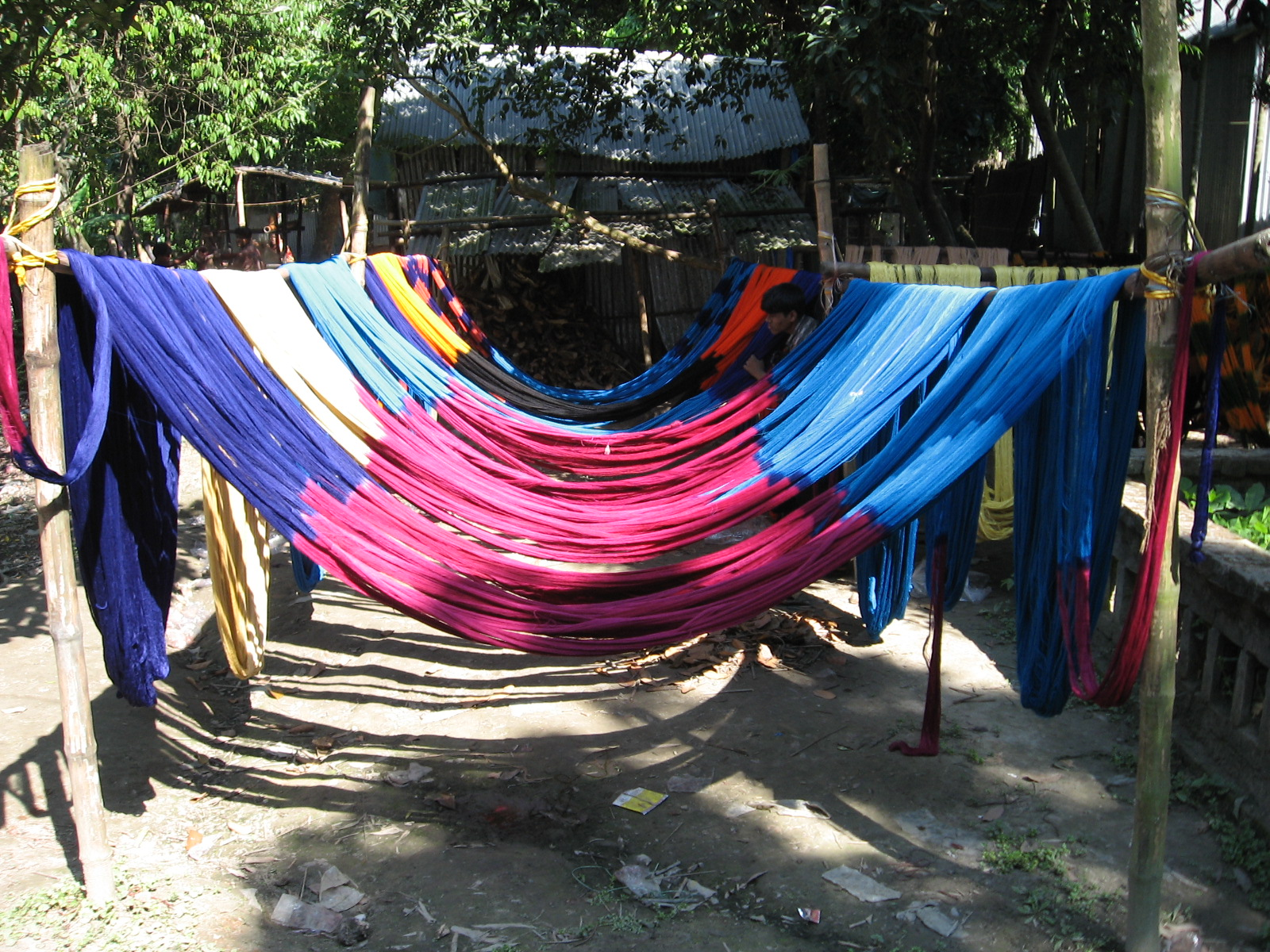
Coloured threads getting dried in the sun in Tangail

=== Baluchari saris ===
The designs on Baluchari saris feature mythology stories that can be seen in the temples of Bishnupur & Bankura of West Bengal. The pallus and borders showcase elaborate designs of flowers, animals and royal court scenes. Some feature scenes from the Ramayana and Mahabharata. The most popular colours of Baluchari saris are green, red, white and yellow.

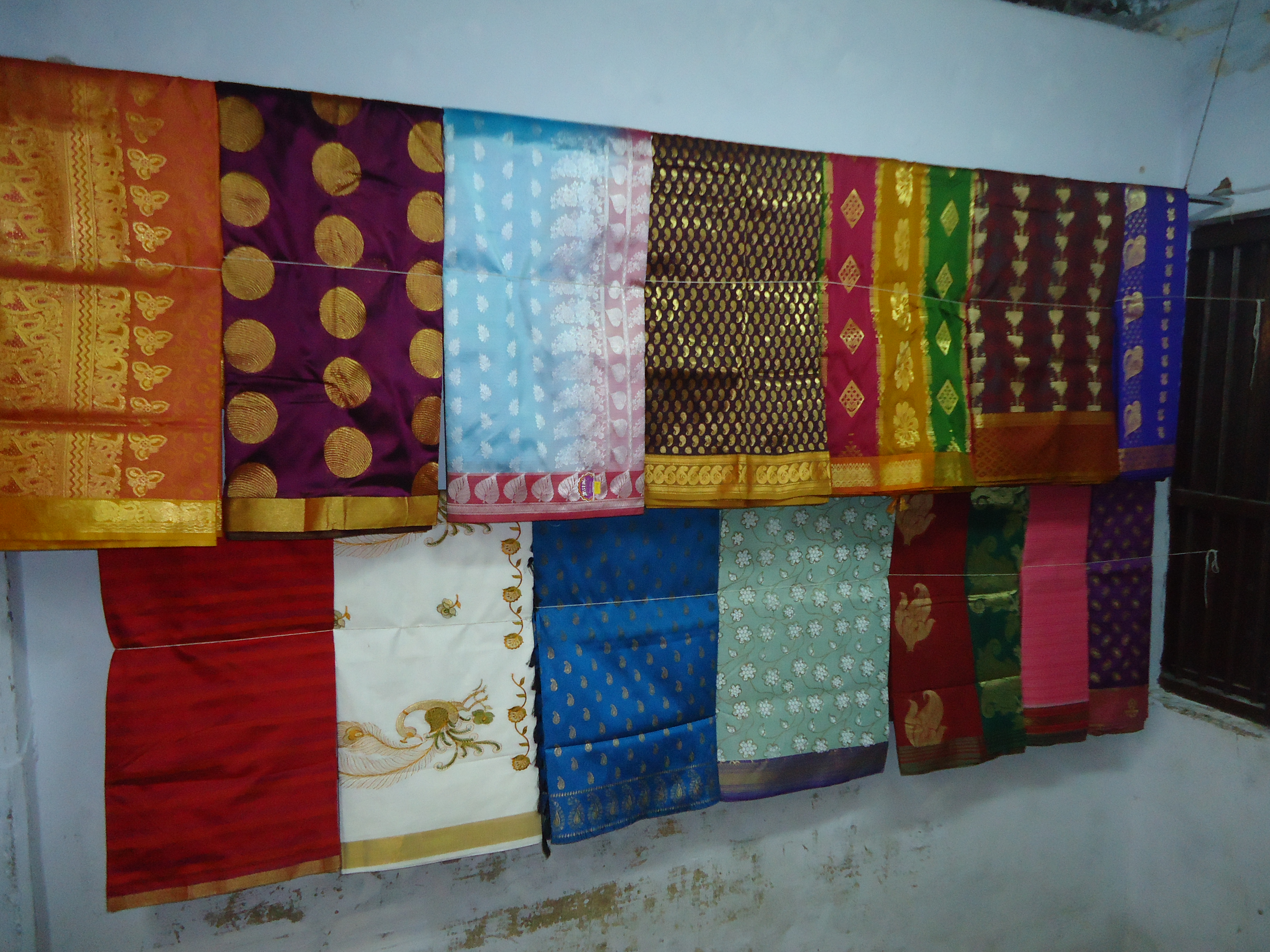
Famous Kanchipuram saris

A master weaver usually takes 20–25 days to complete weaving of a Baluchari sari.

=== Kanchipuram saris ===
The quality of zari used in weaving Kanchipuram saris in Tamil Nadu is viewed as high quality and attracts foreign visitors. The zaris used are generally gold and silver.

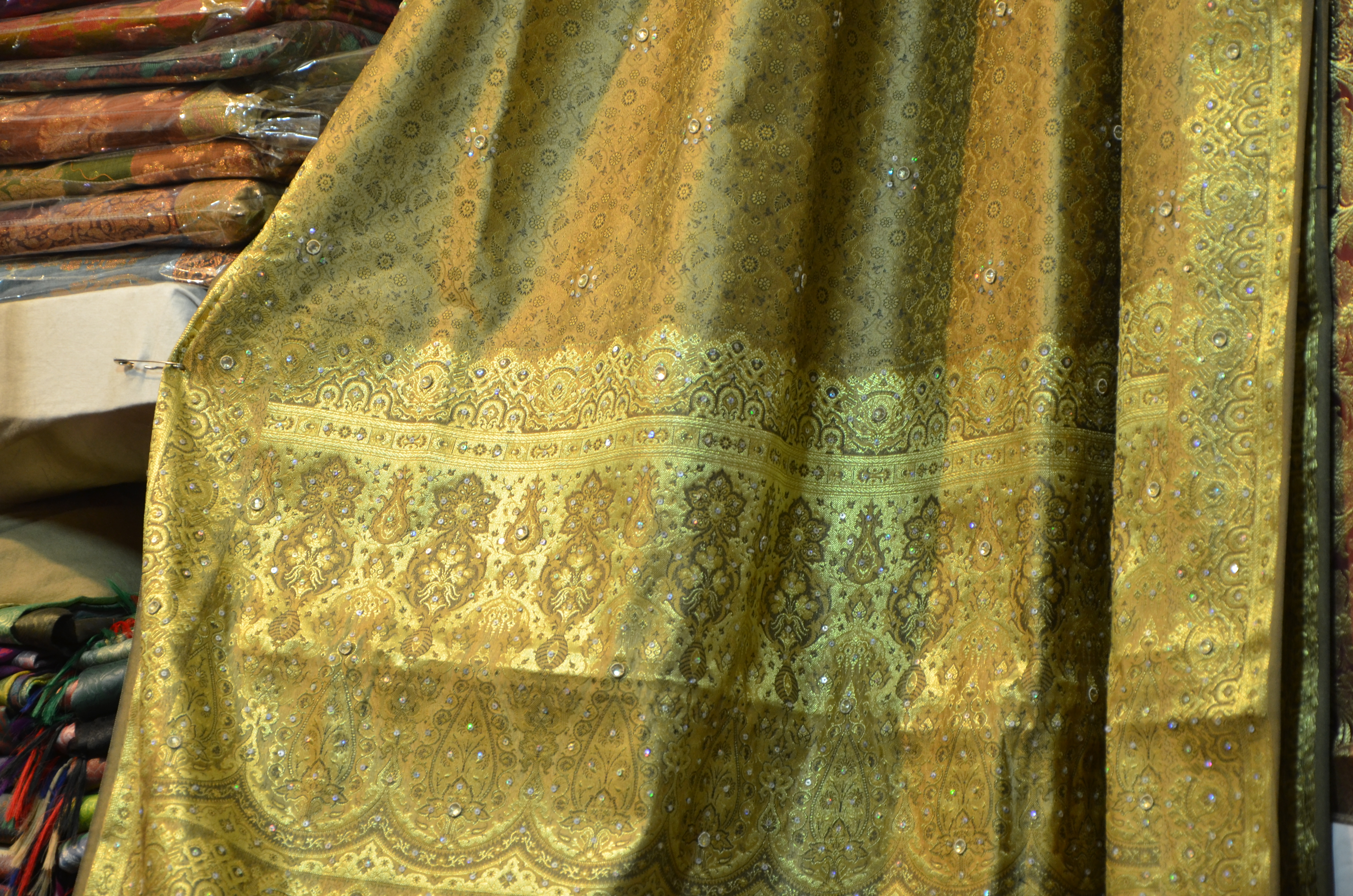
Banarasi saris

=== Maniabandha (aka Nuapatna or Khandua) saris ===
Woven in the Maniabandha village clusters in rural Cuttack district, these are single ikat sarees. Historically, verses of the Geeta Govinda were woven in this fabric which was woven specially for use by the Jagannath Temple in Puri. A particular group of these weavers were and remain Buddhist although many have adopted Hindu practices in order to assimilate with the community.

=== Tussar saris ===
Tussar sari are soft to touch and are woven in areas of Chhattisgarh, Jharkhand and Bhagalpur. The bright colour combinations and the breathable nature of the fabric make it unique.

=== Banarasi saris ===
Banarasi saris have been a valuable possession for brides. Woven by craftsmen of Uttar Pradesh, they feature intricately woven designs with golden and silver threads. These saris are usually heavy and are traditionally worn in festivals as well as at weddings.

=== Narayanpet saree ===
Narayanpet sarees are traditional handwoven saris originating from the town of Narayanpet in the Indian state of Telangana. They are known for their distinctive check-patterned bodies, temple-inspired borders, and contrasting pallus, typically woven in cotton, silk, or silk–cotton blends. The weaving tradition in Narayanpet is believed to have developed during the period of Maratha influence in the Deccan, when migrating artisans introduced stylistic elements that blended with local techniques. Narayanpet sarees received a GI tag in 2015 for their unique regional weaving practices and cultural significance.

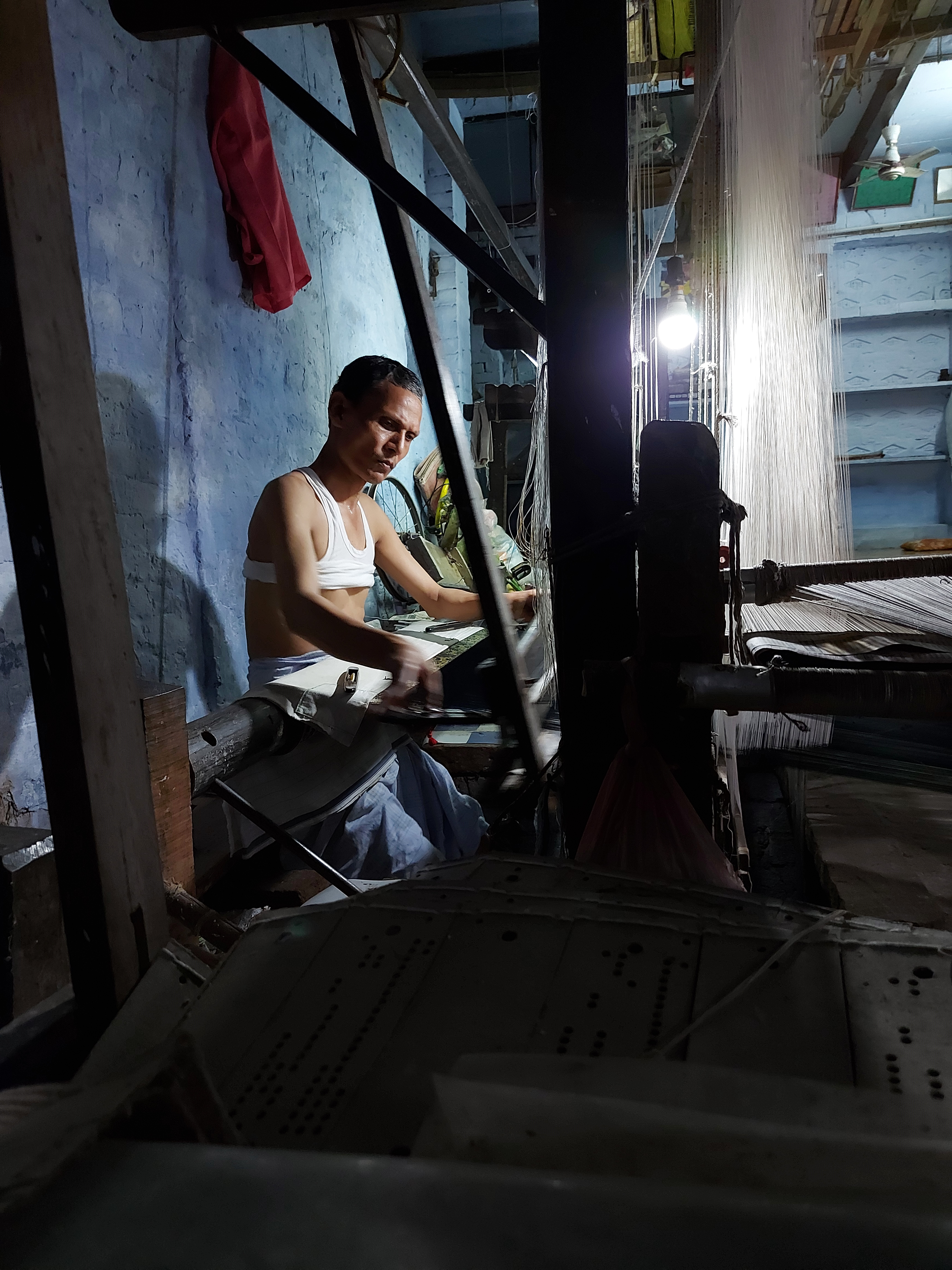
A handloom weavers works 10 hours every day at a Bharat Sthali handloom in Banaras, Uttar Pradesh

== Impact on the economy and weavers' cooperatives ==
The handloom sector plays a vital role in India's economy. It is responsible for nearly 22% of the cloth produced in the country. The handloom sector is the second largest economic activity after agriculture, employing nearly 30 lakh (three hundred thousand) weavers and 4.33 million people in all, according to the Handloom Census of 2009–2010. In the 2010 census, 4.4 million families were engaged in hand weaving. In December 2011, the handloom industry wove 6.9 billion square metres (74.3 billion square feet) of cloth.

The economic policy in India aims to advance the handloom industry from the pre-independence period. The Textile Policy 1985 emphasized the promotion of handloom garments. Andhra Pradesh is said to be the home of 359,212 weaver families who work in primary cooperative handloom societies. Primary Handloom Weavers Cooperatives (PHWCS) includes weavers within certain specific geographical limits and provides production work to the members. The cooperatives also ensure that the weavers receive fair wages and conduct various welfare measures.

== See also ==
- Documentary Film on Handloom Weavers of Varanasi
- Khadi
- Khādī Development and Village Industries Commission (Khadi Gramodyog)
