= Textile arts of Bangladesh =

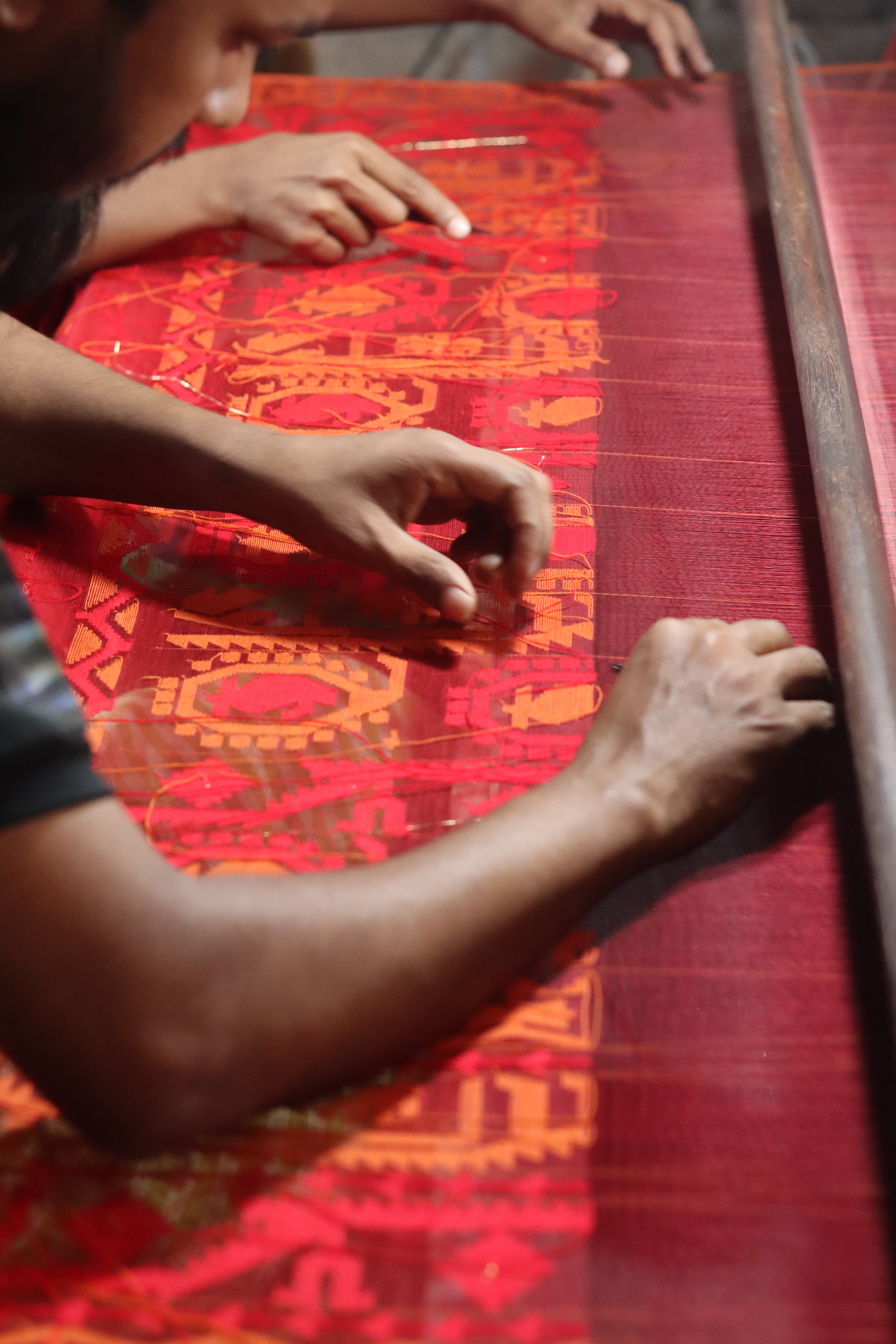
Jamdani weaving

The history of the textile arts of Bangladesh dates back to the 1st century AD. According to the archaeological excavations, Bangladesh was once famous for its artistic textile production throughout the world. Over the years, several types of textiles evolved in the country, mostly by the indigenous handloom manufacturers.

== History ==
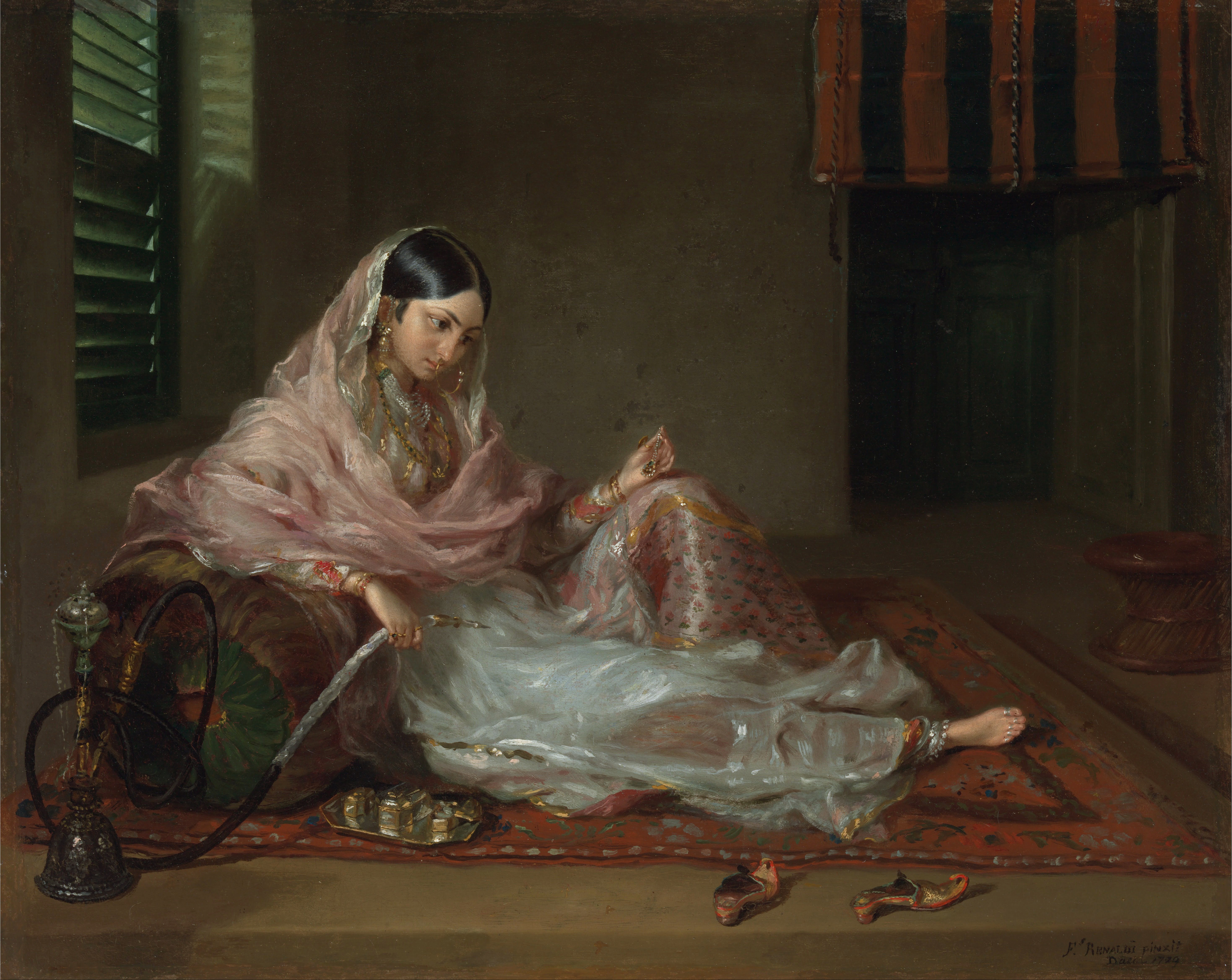
A woman wearing a silver-embroidered muslin

The fine, transparent mulmul known as muslin in Europe manufactured by the weavers of Bengal was established as a commercial product almost 2000 years ago. Gangetic muslin is referred to by Greek and Roman writers. It is known from their writing that it was the most favored among the luxury goods imported from India. The fabric was often referred to as Dhaka Muslin. These were also known by beautiful poetic names in Rome such as – nebula which means mist, vapor or cloud, and venti textiles, woven winds. Similar names are still used in Dhaka.

The most important commodities were fine cotton and, later, silk. The East India Company, already well established in Goa began to cast covetous glances at Bengal in the early 16th century. In 1536 they set up trading posts at Satgaon and Chittagong. In the mid – 17th century the East India company of London was permitted by the Mughal government to establish a few factories (trading posts) in Bengal.

The handloom textile industry employs a large section of the population. About 60 to 65 percent of the demand for textiles in Bangladesh is supplied by the handloom industry.

== Types ==
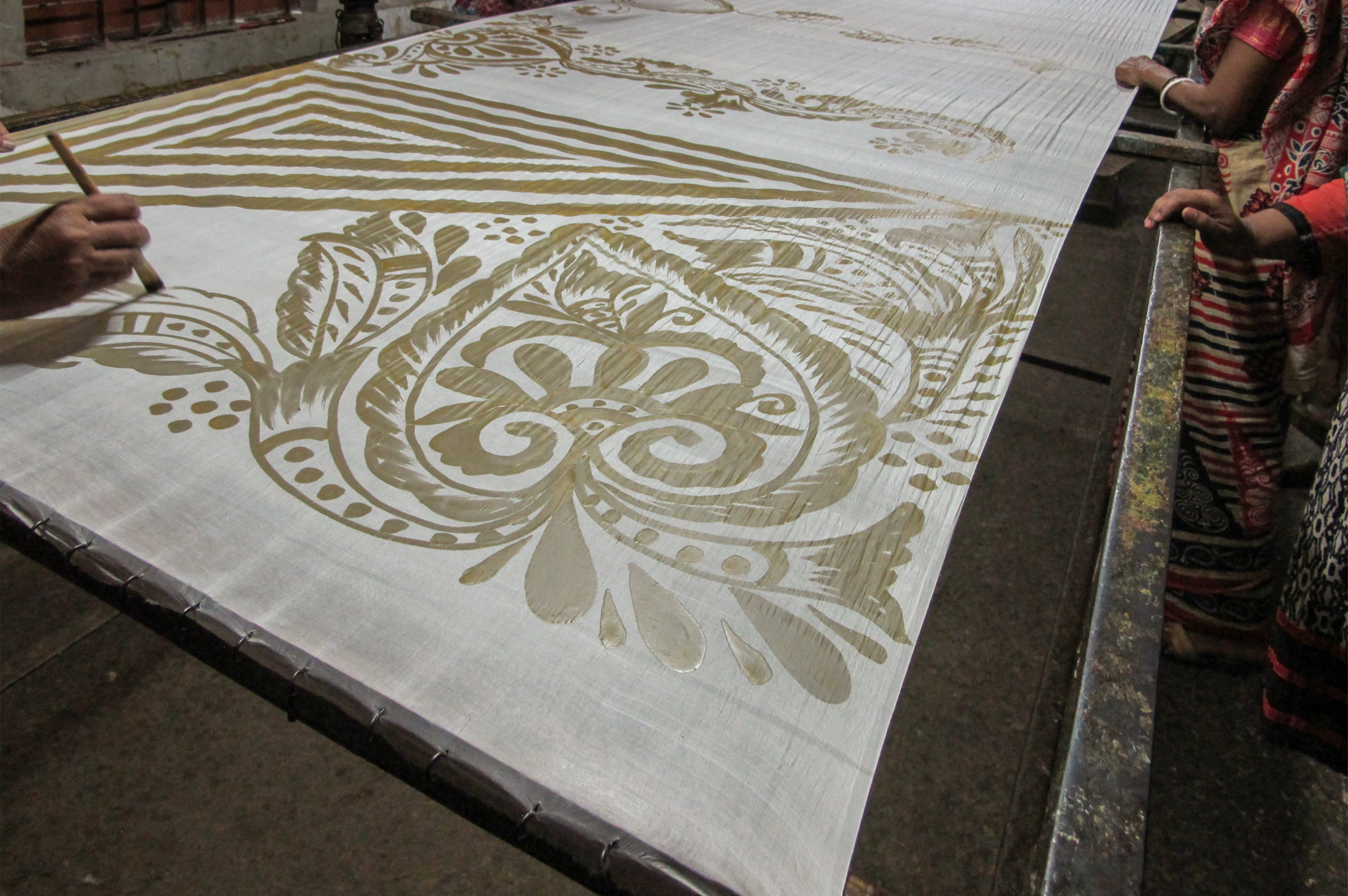
Applying wax on Rajshahi Silk

- Muslin: Durgadas Lahiri has mentioned in Bharatbarsher Itihas that in 1462 BC most mummies of Egypt were covered in muslins. George Birdwood describes muslin "comely as curtain of Solomon" that is older than the code of Manu. The meaning of the word muslin is not clearly known.
- Tant: From ancient times only persons from the Tanti worked on the loom. Weavers generally came into this profession from the Hindu Tanti or Kayastha castes.
- Khadi or khaddar has a long history in Bangladesh. In the 6th century a local variation of Khadi cloth was described by Huen Tsang of China. Marco Polo described a fabric from the Bengal region, probably khadi muslin, calling it as fine as the spider's web.
- Cotton: Watts and Brown mention that the cotton fabric of Bengal was manufactured in many regions, including Burdwan, Birbhum, and Bankura. The muslin of Dhaka was renowned.
- Rajshahi silk: Silks of Bangladesh include tassar silk, muga silk and eri silk.
- Mixed fabrics: As Islam forbids the use of pure silk garbs in religious ceremonies the artistic use of many mixed fibers was observed in the subcontinent. Mulberry silk and cotton mixes are called garbhasuti or asmani.
- Jamdani: Loom-figured, diversely ornamented muslin is called jamdani.
- Sari, Lungi and other garments: In rural Bangladesh the word sari and kapor mean the same thing. The sari has always been made in the same form. The word dhoti is derived from dhowa ("washing"). The word gamchha is derived from ga mocha (wiping the body). At present the lungi is the most popular wear for men.
- Tangail Sari: Tangail was known for sari made by the weavers of Bajitpur under the patronage of local zamindars. A central artisan's cooperative society was established in the 1930s to organize the weavers' caste and preserve the Tangail sari tradition.
