= Mullipattu =

Mullipattu Mullai Vanam
- Mullipattu
- Location in Tamil Nadu, India Mullipattu (India)
- Coordinates: 12°40′13″N 79°15′32″E
- Country: India
- State: Tamil Nadu
- District: Tiruvannamalai

Mullipattu is a village located in Arani, Tiruvannamalai, India.

Mullipattu was formerly called Mullai Vanam, which means forest. The main work of the villagers is weaving and agriculture.

Mullipattu village is in Arani town, known for its silk sarees called "Arani pattu." Arani silk is famous worldwide.

Most of the villagers in Mullipattu work as Handloom weavers and farmers. Handloom weavers

Mullipattu has several temples, with one of the oldest being the Aabathsagayeswarar Temple. There is also a school in Mullipattu.

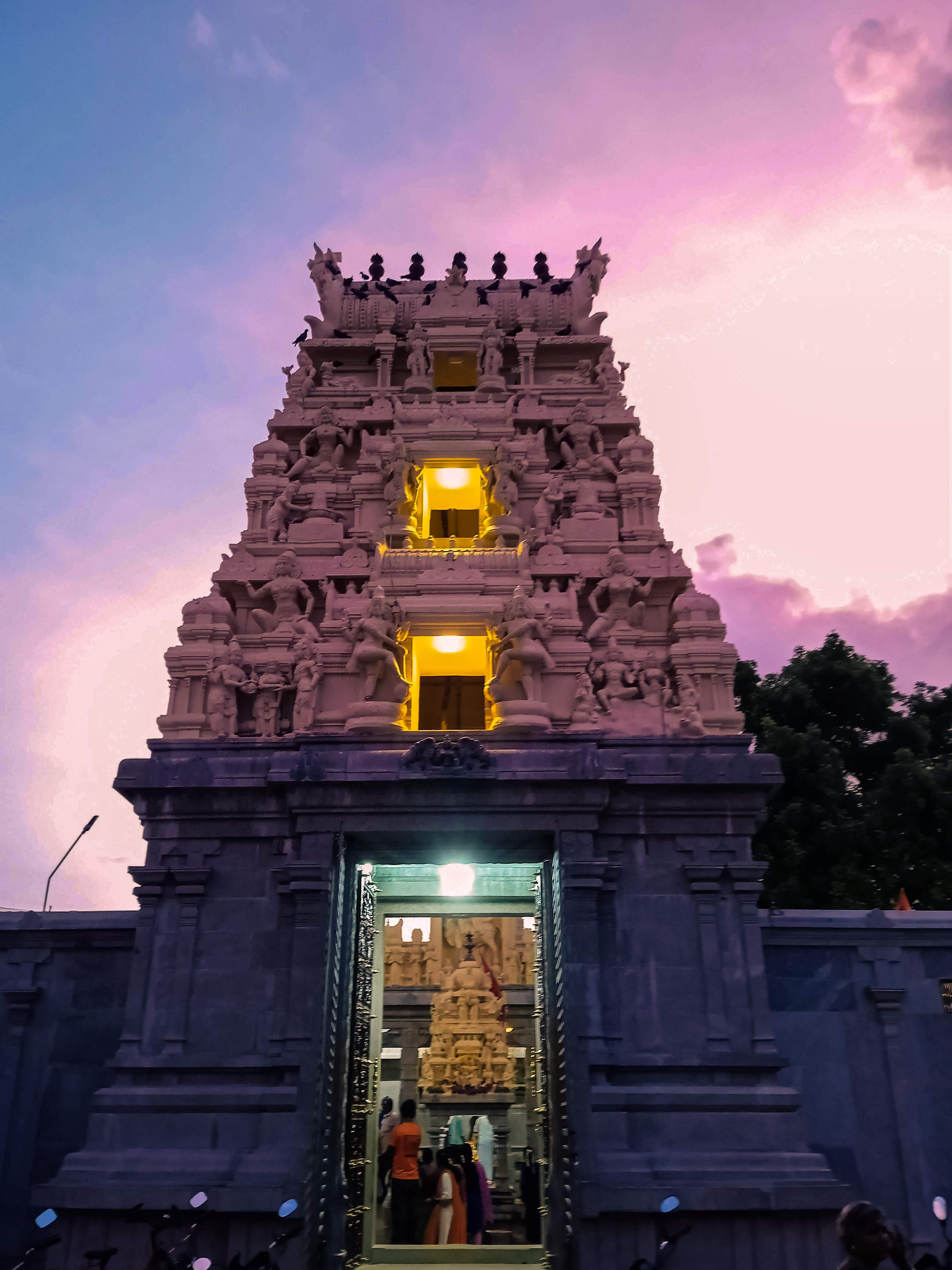
Aabathsaga Eshwarar Temple

Location: Mullipattu is located in the southern part of India, specifically in the Thiruvannamalai district of Tamil Nadu.

== Population ==
The population of Mullipattu can vary, but it is typically a smaller village compared to larger urban areas.

Culture

The culture in Mullipattu is influenced by the traditions and customs of Tamil Nadu, which includes a rich history of art, music, and dance.

== Economy ==
The economy of Mullipattu is often based on Handloom weaving, agriculture, with many residents engaged in farming activities. Rice, millet, and pulses are some of the common crops grown in the region.

Connectivity: Mullipattu is connected to nearby towns and cities through road networks. Arani is one of the nearby towns, providing access to additional services and amenities.

Local Attractions: While Mullipattu itself may not have major tourist attractions, but have several temples filled with lot of history.

Mullipattu

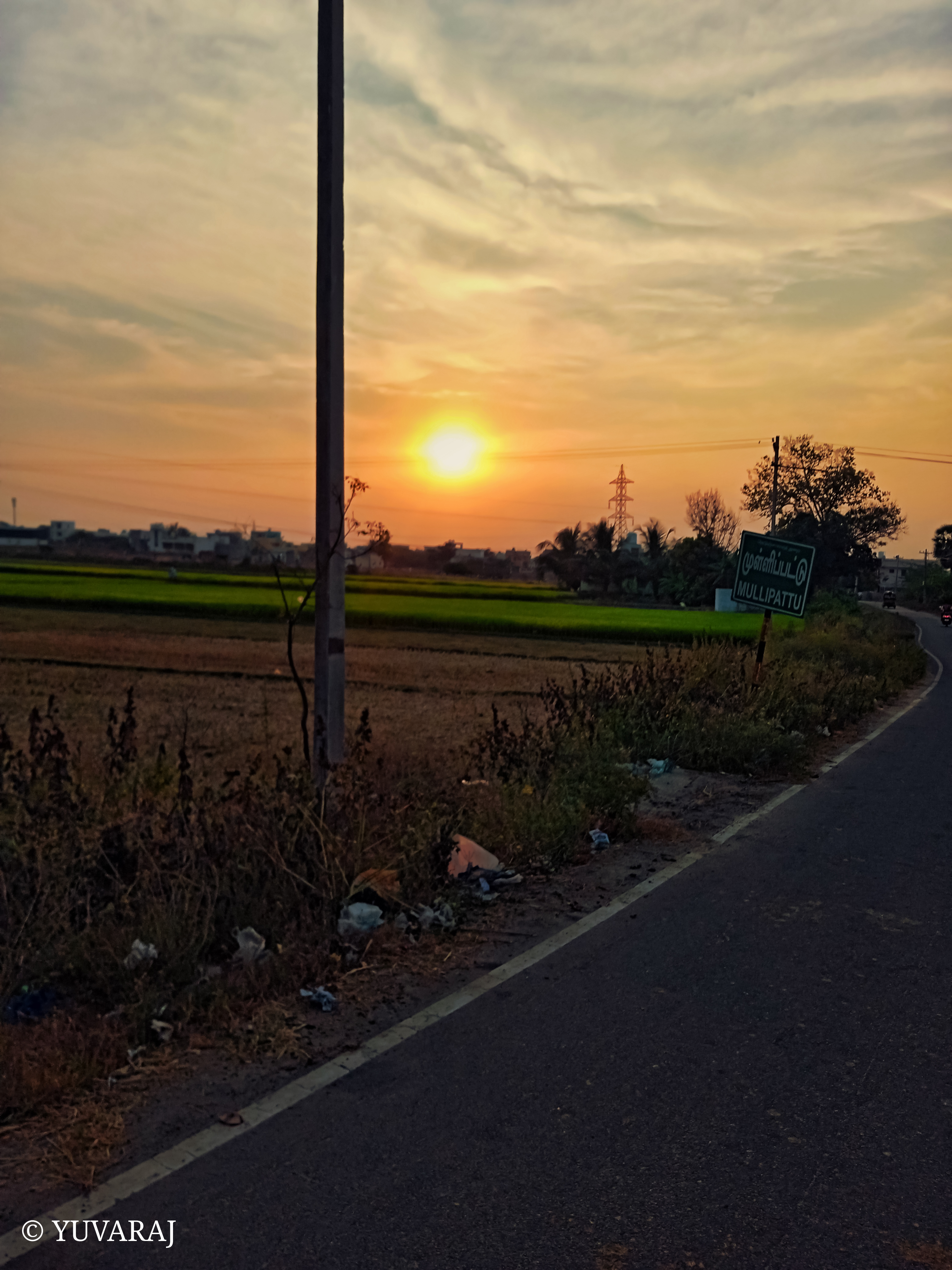
Mullipattu

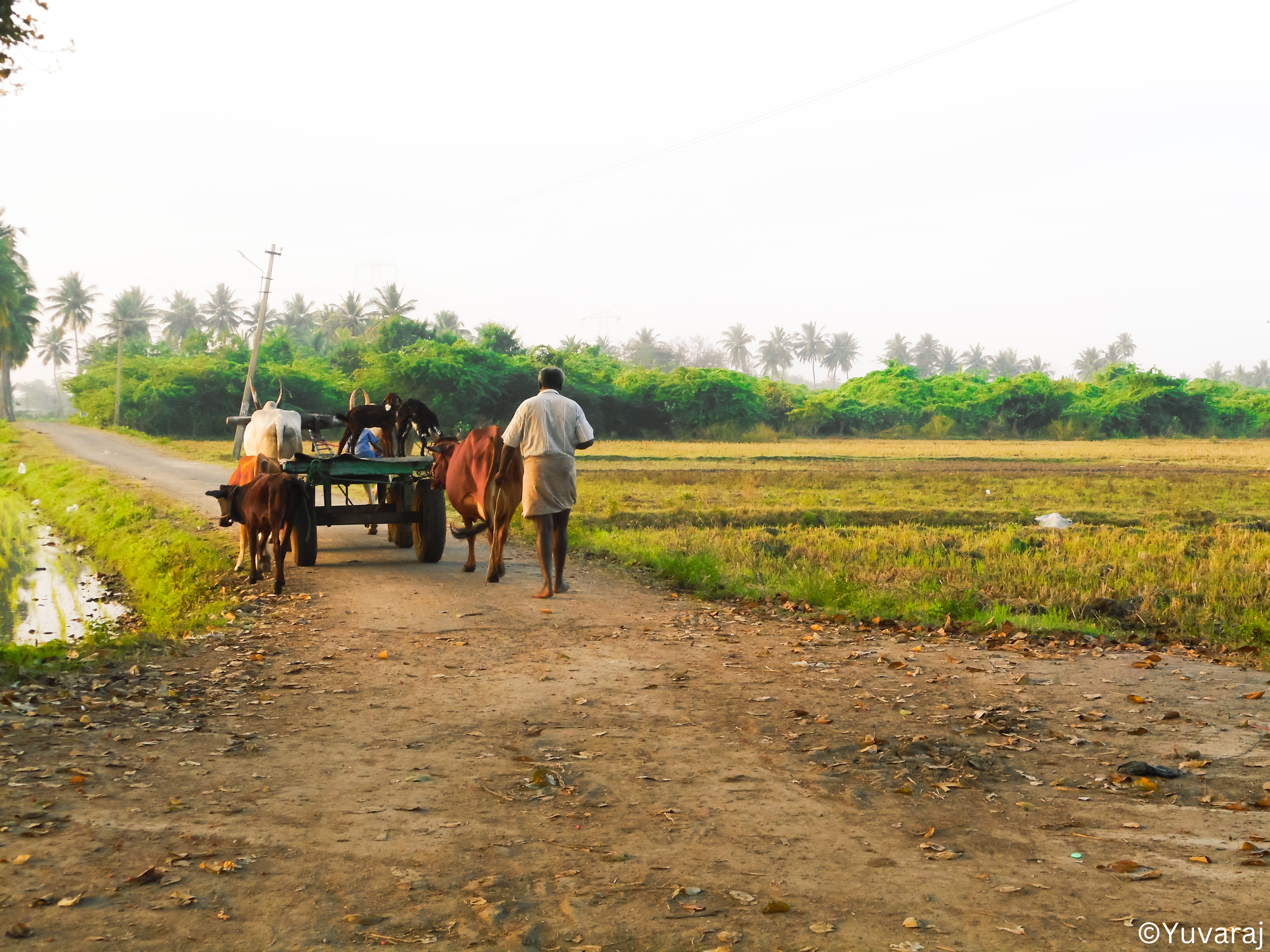
Mullipattu
