= Tantuja =

Handloom brand of West Bengal, India

Tantuja is a government-backed handloom brand of West Bengal, India, with its headquarters in Kolkata. It is operated by the West Bengal State Handloom Weavers' Cooperative Society. Tantuja represents regional weaving traditions such as Tant, Jamdani, Baluchari, and Kantha. Its products are sold through state-run retail outlets and exhibitions across West Bengal and other parts of India.

== History ==
Tantuja was established on October 1, 1954. It focuses on preserving traditional Bengali handlooms such as Tant Cotton and Baluchari Silk.

== Retail outlets and awards ==
Tantuja has retail stores across West Bengal, mainly in Kolkata, Basirhat, Howrah, Sreerampur, Asansol, Kalyani, Shantiniketan, Siliguri, Coochbehar and Jalpaiguri, and in New Delhi. Tantuja received several awards from organisations across India for its craftsmanship.
