= Garbhasuti =

Mixed cloth of tussar silk and cotton

Garbhasuti was a mixed cloth of tussar silk and cotton produced in Bengal. It was a handwoven material in the 19th century, Manbhum and Bankura produced most of it. Garbhasuti was a common name for fabrics with a cotton warp and a silk weft. Typically, it was ten yards long and one yard wide, which cost Rs. eight per piece. More often Garbhasuti was a made-to-order material.

== Variations ==
"Asmani" was the name given to a mixed fabric made of cotton and dyed silk. There were more variations of Garbhasuti such as when made with gold on its end and border, it was called "garbhasuti fari kinar".
