= Kantha =

Type of embroidery

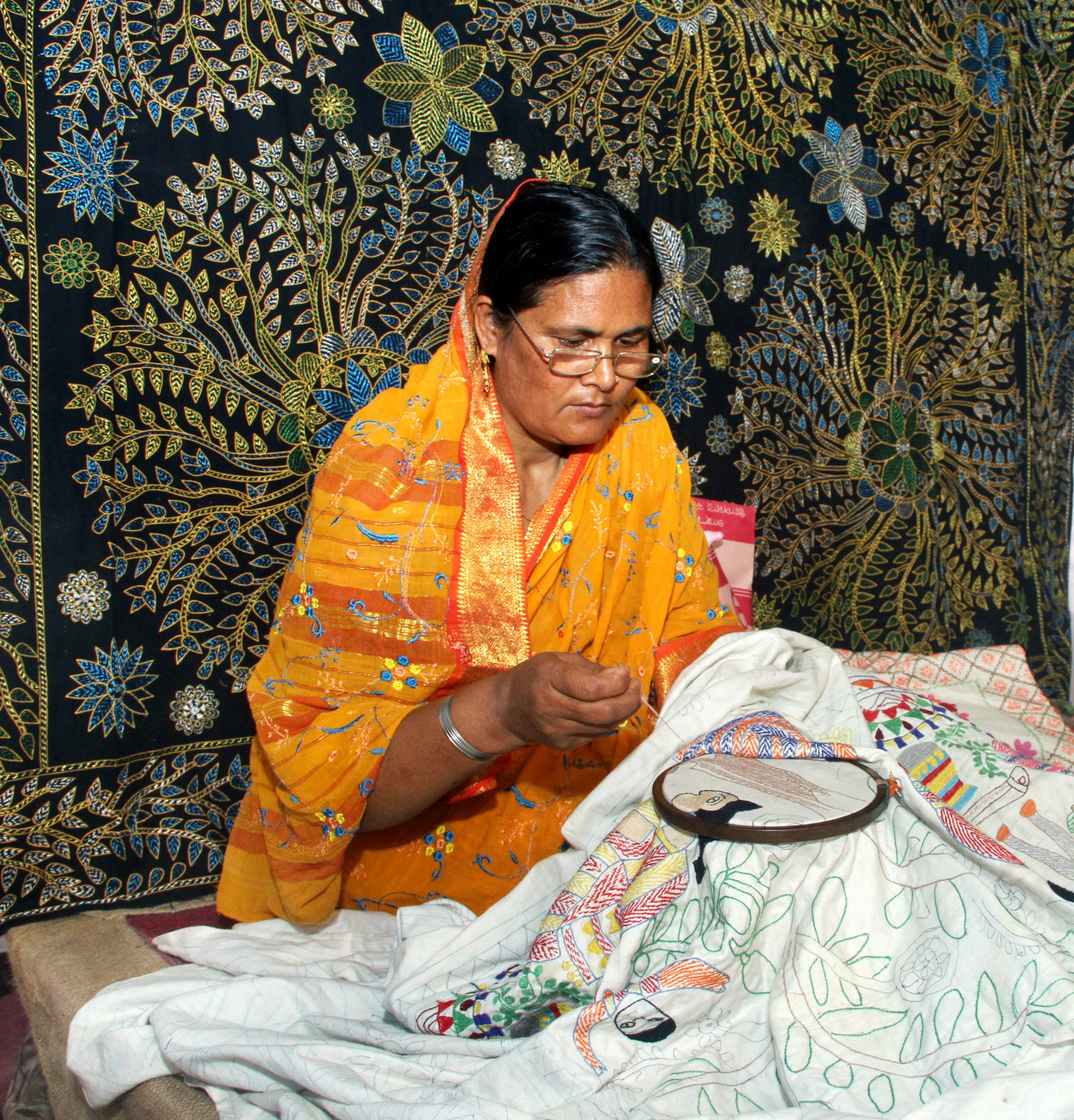
Traditional kantha stitching in Bangladesh

Kantha (Bengali: কাঁথা; Hindi: कान्था), also spelled kanta or qanta, is a type of embroidery craft in Bangladesh and eastern regions of India, particularly in the Indian states of West Bengal, Tripura and Odisha.

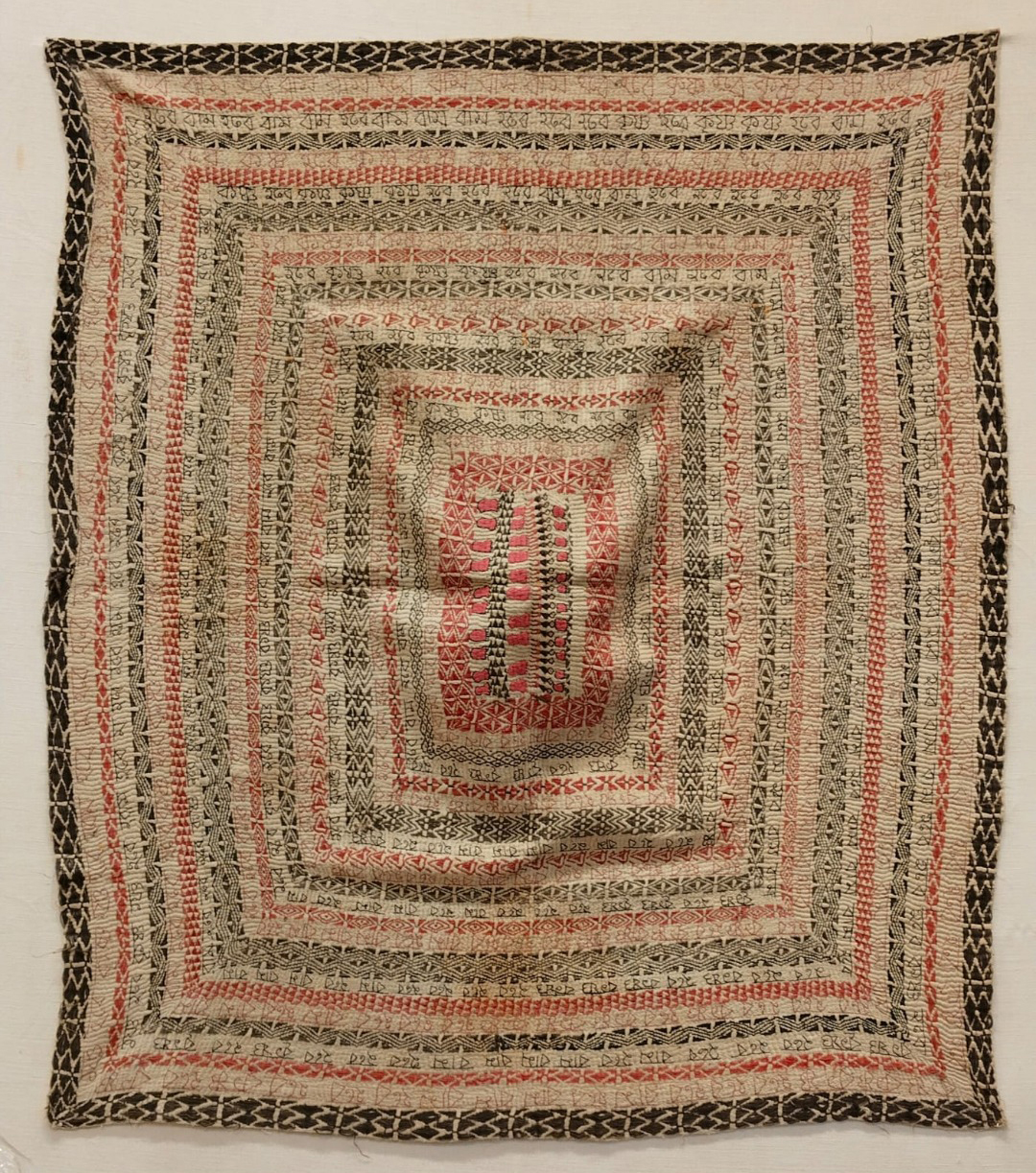
Antique quilted kantha inscribed with the meditative chant Ram Krishna, courtesy the Wovensouls collection, Singapore

In Odisha, old saris are stacked on each other and hand-stitched to make a thin piece of cushion. This is normally used above a bed cushion or instead of a cushion. Kantha saris are traditionally worn by women in the Bengal region. In the modern day, embroidery is stitched, popularly known as 'kantha stitched", on sari, kurta (or panjabi) and churidar and many other garments and gaining popularity due to their aesthetic value and handmade characteristics.

Kantha stitching is also used to make simple quilts, commonly known as nakshi kantha. Women in Bengal typically use old saris and cloth and layer them with kantha stitching to make a light blanket, throw, or bedspread, especially for children. Kantha is very popular with tourists visiting the Bengal region of the Indian subcontinent.

== Etymology ==
The word kantha has no discernible etymological root. The exact origin of the word is not precisely known, although it probably has a precursor in kheta (meaning "field" in Bengali). According to Niaz Zaman, the word kantha originates from the Sanskrit word kontha, which means rags, as kantha is made of rags. Its name in Bengali also varies from dialect to dialect and may be known as কাঁথা, খেতা, কেন্থা, শুজনি romanized in ISO standard 15919 as kām̐thā, khētā, kēnthā, śujani respectively.

== Weave ==
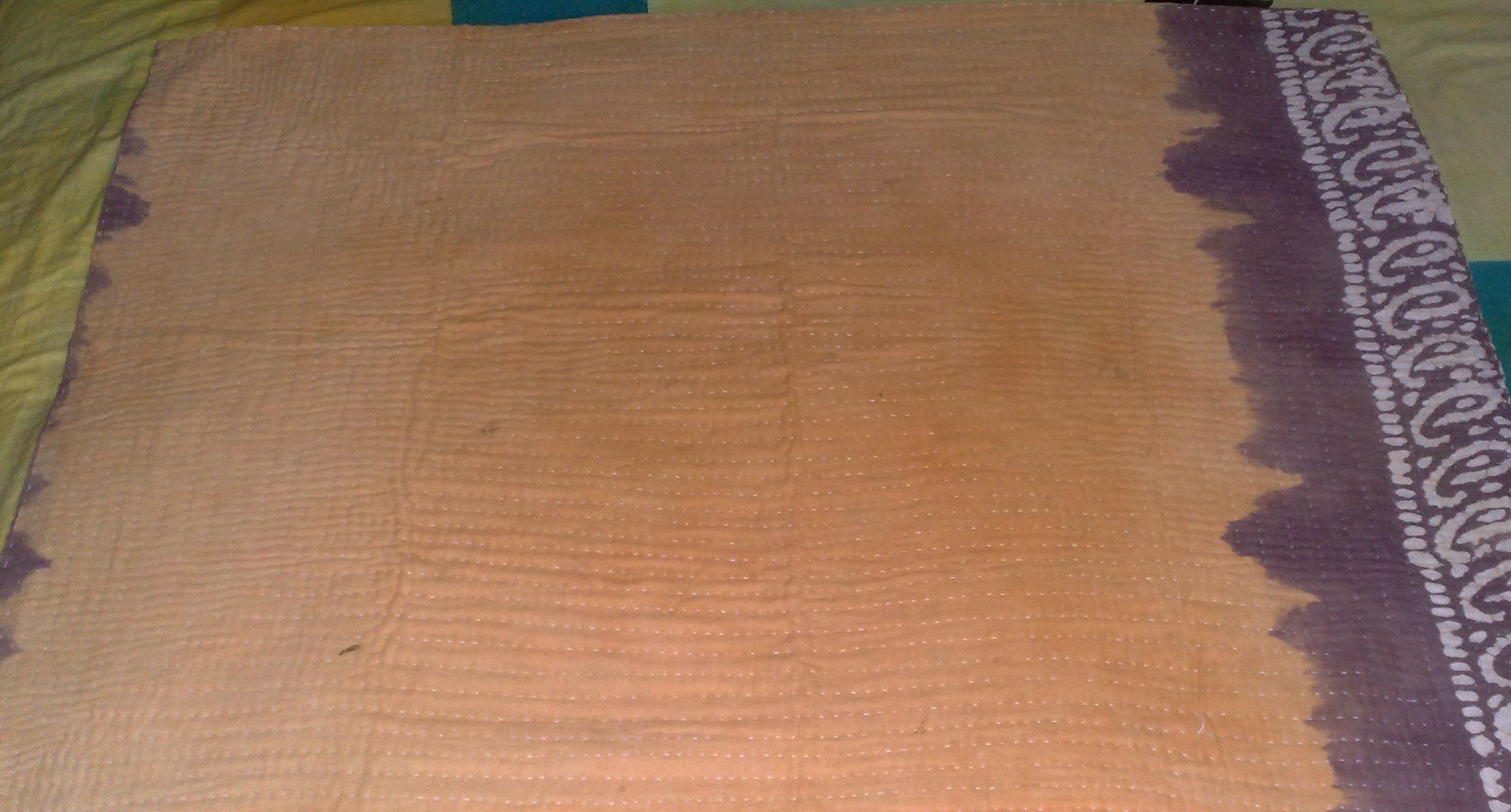
Kantha used as bedding for a baby

Kantha is a form of embroidery often practised by rural women. The traditional form of Kantha embroidery was done with soft dhotis and saris, with a simple running stitch along the edges. Depending on the use of the finished product they were known as Lepkantha or Sujni Kantha.

The embroidered cloth has many uses including shawls, covers for mirrors, boxes, and pillows. In some cases, the entire cloth is covered with running stitches, employing beautiful motifs of flowers, animals, birds and geometrical shapes, as well as themes from everyday activities. The stitching on the cloth gives it a slightly wrinkled, wavy effect. Contemporary kantha is applied to a wider range of garments such as sarees, dupatta, shirts for men and women, bedding and other furnishing fabrics, mostly using cotton and silk. Modern Kantha-stitch craft industry involves a very complex multi-staged production model.

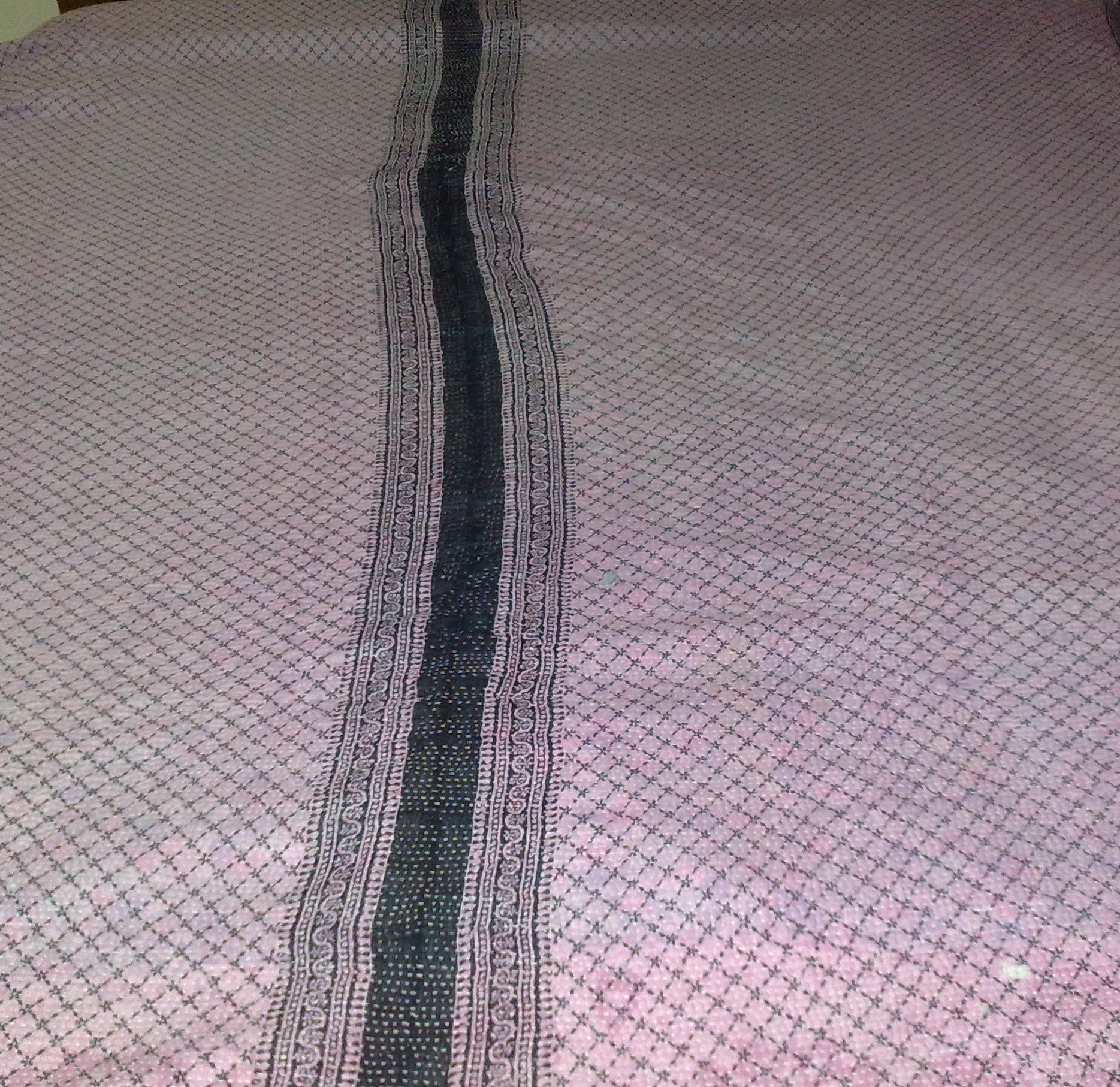
Kantha used as bedding

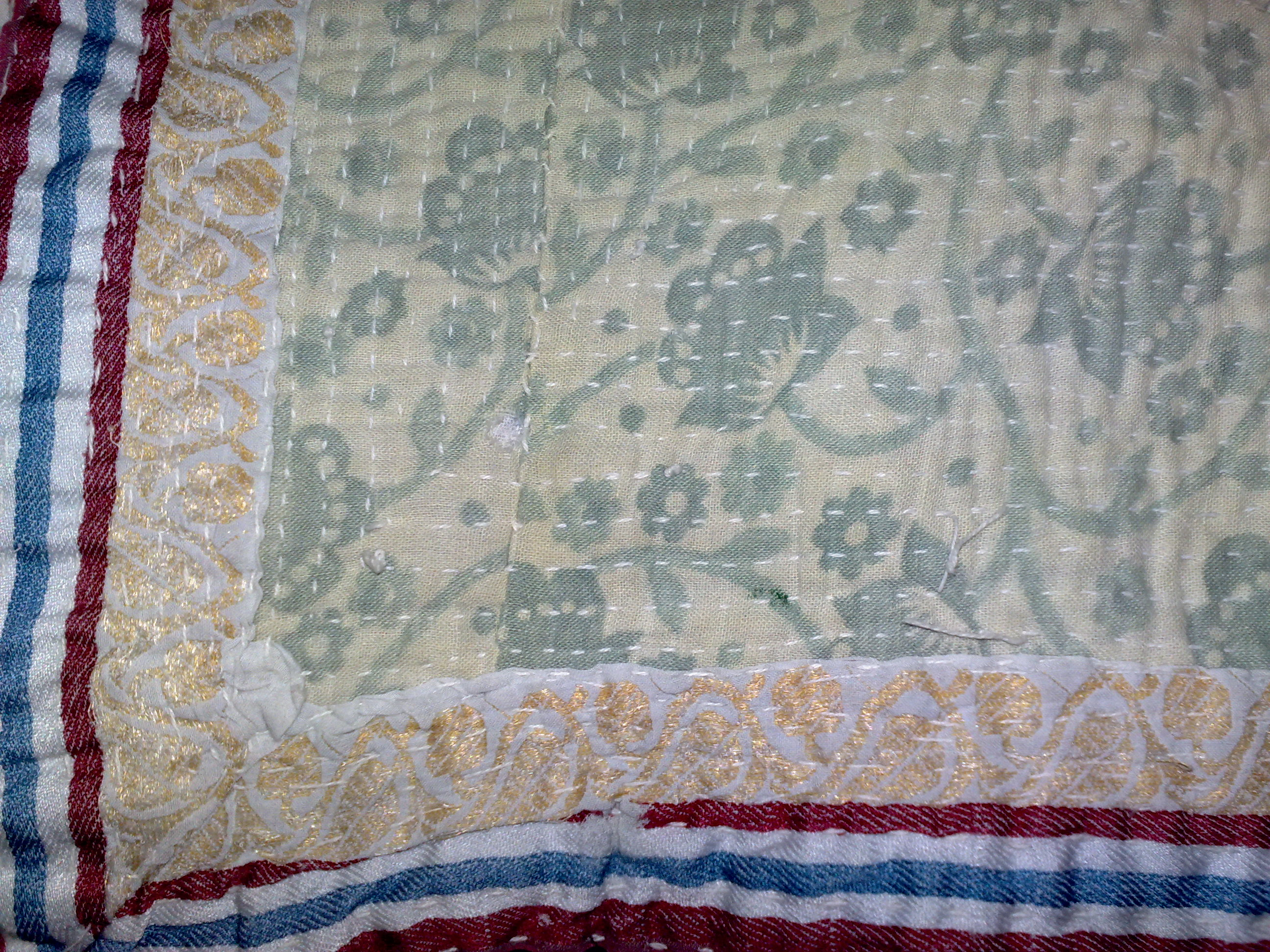
Closeup of a kantha. In the left and bottom Paar is shown, also the running stitches (white) are seen.

== See also ==
- Textile arts of Bangladesh
- Embroidery of India
- Nakshi kantha

== Sources ==
- Ahmad, Perveen (1997). The Aesthetics & Vocabulary of Nakshi Kantha. Dhaka: Bangladesh National Museum. ISBN 984-585-000-6.
- Zaman, Niaz (1993). The Art of Kantha Embroidery (Second Revised ed.). Dhaka: University Press. ISBN 978-984-05-1228-7.
