= Handloom industry in Tangail =

Cottage industries in West Bengal

The handloom industry in Tangail is one of the oldest cottage industries in Bangladesh. This traditional saree is produced in Tangail district and is named after the place.

== Origin and evaluation ==
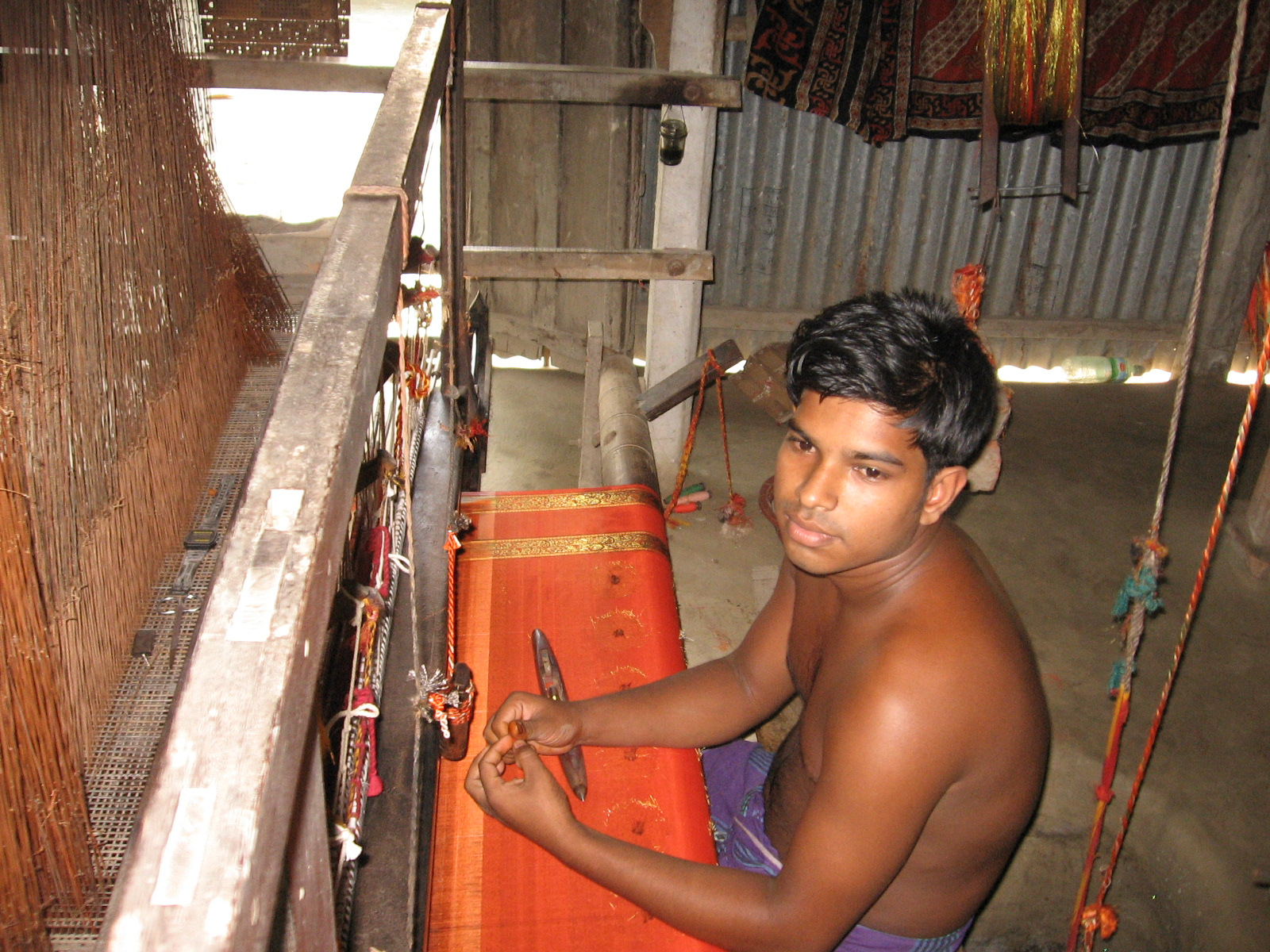
A weaver Berabuchina

The handloom industry in Tangail evolved during the last decades of the nineteenth century. The weavers of this Tangail cloth are the successors of the famous Muslin weavers. They were originally from Dhamrai and Chowhatta of Dhaka district and were invited to Tangail by the Jamidars (landlords) of Delduar, Santosh and Gharinda. The weavers made settlements in twenty-two adjacent villages in Tangail. At first they weaved only plain cloth. The Swadeshi movement called by Mahatma Gandhi in 1906 aimed to boycott cotton textiles from Lancashire, which inspired the use of local cotton cloths and the handloom industry in East Bengal (present-day Bangladesh) flourished at that time. During 1923–24 motifs and designs were introduced on saree. Jacquard looms were introduced during 1931–1932 for making sarees.

== Present condition of the industry ==
The handloom industry in Tangail is a cottage industry and the looms are mostly installed in households. 72% of the total installed looms have a unit size of five looms. Units with six to ten looms are 11% and units with eleven to twenty looms are 6% of the total. Units with twenty-one onward looms occupy 11% of the total and are considered small factories. However, a study done by the Ministry of Industries in 1982, shows that small factories have 20% of handlooms. In the year 1992, there were over 100,000 handlooms and 1,50000 weavers in Tangail, located in Sadar, Kalihati, Nagarpur, and Basail upazilas. In the year 2008 there were 37222 handlooms in 10000 small and big handloom factories and there were more than 70000 weavers working under the Basic Centres in several upazilas of Tangail. A survey conducted in 2013 said there are 60,000 looms in Tangail. Of them, 8,305 are pit looms, 51,141 are Chittranjan looms and 892 are power looms.

Tangail handloom is known for its uniqueness. The workers need to have special skills to weave and design Tangail sarees. The Basak community of Patrail Union of Tangail is a community of weavers who are still continuing the original making process of Tangail saree. The weavers sell the sarees in temporary bazaars that sit only twice a week in Bazitpur and Korotia. Traders come to these bazaars to purchase sarees.

== Types of Tangail handloom saree ==
A Handloom Mill in Rajshahi

- Cotton Saree
- Half Silk Saree
- Soft Silk Saree
- Cotton Jamdani Saree
- Gas-mercerised Saree
- Twisted Cotton Saree
- Dangoo Saree
- Balucherri Saree

== Export of Tangail handloom ==
Tangail Saree is in demand in many countries, like India, America, Japan, the Middle East, and some European countries. Each week Bangladesh exports around 50,000 pieces of sarees to India.

== Existing problems ==
The handloom industry is in crisis because of the increase in the price of thread, yarn, dye and other raw materials and insufficient transportation and supply chain facilities. As a result, many weavers are leaving their profession and migrating.
