= Tant sari =

Traditional Bengali sari

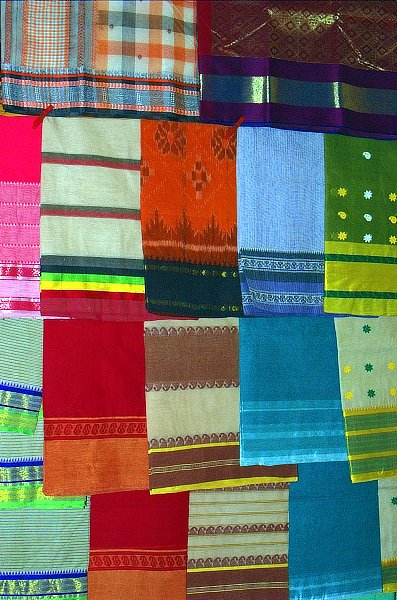
Tant Saree

Tant sari is a traditional Bengali sari, originating from the Bengal region in the eastern part and usually used by Bengali women. Tant sari are woven from cotton threads and distinguished by its lightness and transparency. It is considered to be the most comfortable sari for the hot and humid climate in the Indian subcontinent.

== History ==
Under the royal guidance the tant (specially jamdani) and muslin became famous in and around Dacca (now Dhaka, Bangladesh) and Murshidabad (now West Bengal, India) in the Mughal era. British government tried to destroy this art to protect the textile industry of Manchester, but the tant culture managed to survive.

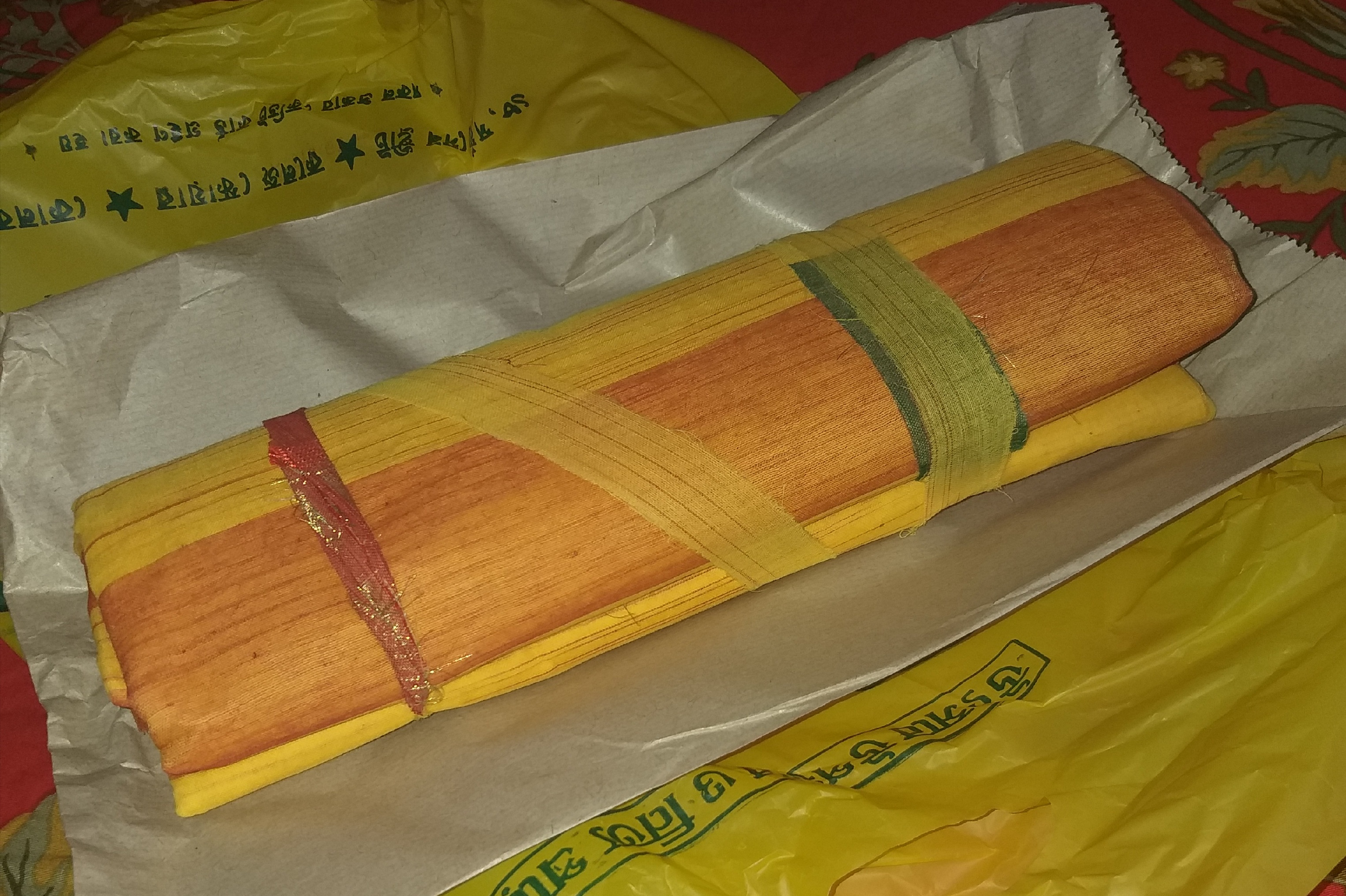
A traditional Bengali Tant sari in a Bengali household, 2019.

With the division of Bengal province during the partition of 1947, some of the weavers migrated to West Bengal and continued their craftsmanship there. Thus the tant weavers are now seen in both parts of Bengal.

== Weaving method ==
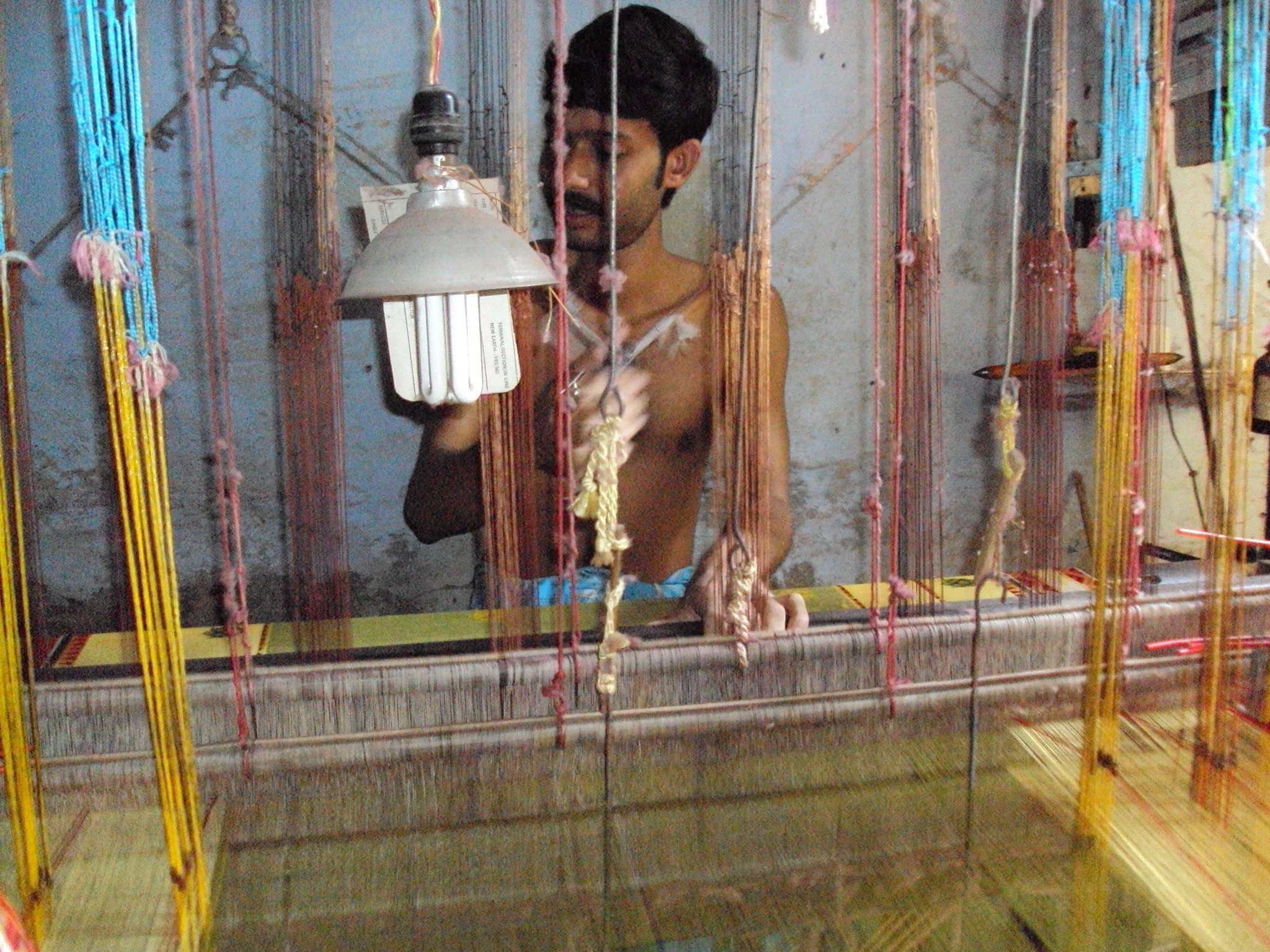
Tant sari in making, near Bishnupur, Bankura.

Weaving of tant sari is famous and an age old crafting of Bengal. The craftsmen deftly weave the cotton to thread which is woven to tant sari. Two shuttles are used for this purpose. Traditionally, handlooms were used by the weavers, which have today been largely replaced by power looms to weave these saris.

== Themes and motif ==
The typical Tant sari is characterised by a thick border and a decorative pallav, woven using a variety of floral, paisley and other artistic motifs. Some of the popular traditional motifs are: bhomra (bumble bee), tabij (amulet), rajmahal (royal palace), ardha-chandra (half moon), chandmala (garland of moons), ansh (fish scale), hathi (elephant), nilambari (blue sky), ratan chokh (gem-eyed), benki (spiral), tara (star), kalka (paisley) and phool (flower). Printed, hand-painted and embroidered patterns are also used to get a larger variety of designs. Different motifs including floral element, solar element and recently even modern art are depicted in this sari. Tant Sari comes with colourful design and borders are made thicker because it is subjected to tear easily.

The traditional art of weaving jamdani, considered the best variety of tant clothing, has been enlisted by UNESCO as an Intangible Cultural Heritage of Humanity.

Along with ordinary Bengali women of Bangladesh and West Bengal, many prominent Bengali female personalities also prefer to wear tant sari as their regular outfit. Bangladesh prime minister Sheikh Hasina, speaker of Bangladesh parliament Shirin Sharmin Chaudhury, West Bengal chief minister Mamata Banerjee are notable among them.

== Care ==
It is recommended that before the first wash, tant saris should be soaked briefly in warm water mixed with rock salt, to prevent the sari from bleeding colour during subsequent washes. Washing with a mild detergent, followed by starching and then hanging them to dry in a shaded area will ensure the longevity of these cotton saris.
