= Bangladeshi national calendar =

Civil calendar used in Bangladesh

The Bangladeshi national calendar, known as Bengali calendar (Bengali: বঙ্গাব্দ, romanized: Bôṅgābdô) officially and commonly, is a civil calendar used in Bangladesh, alongside the Gregorian calendar. With roots in the ancient calendars of the region, it is based on Tarikh-e-Elahi (Divine Era), introduced by the Mughal Emperor Akbar on 10/11 March 1584. The calendar is generally 593 years behind the Gregorian calendar, meaning the year zero in the calendar is 593 CE.

The calendar is important for Bangladeshi agriculture, as well as festivals and traditional record keeping for revenue and taxation. Bangladeshi land revenues are still collected by the government in line with this calendar. The calendar's new year day, Pohela Boishakh, is a national holiday.

The government and newspapers of Bangladesh widely use the abbreviation B.S. (Bangla Son, or Bangla Sal, or Bangla Sombat) for Bangladeshi calendar era. For example, the last paragraph in the preamble of the Constitution of Bangladesh reads "In our Constituent Assembly, this eighteenth day of Kartick, 1379 B.S., corresponding to the fourth day of November, 1972 A.D., do hereby adopt, enact and give to ourselves this Constitution."

== History ==
=== Origins ===
The Saka Era was the widely used in Bengal, prior to the arrival of Muslim rule in the region, according to various epigraphical evidence. The Bikrami calendar was in use by the Bengali people of the region. This calendar was named after king Vikramaditya with a zero date of 57 BCE. In rural Bengali communities, the Bengali calendar is credited to "Bikromaditto", like many other parts of India and Nepal. However, unlike these regions where it starts in 57 BCE, the modern Bangladeshi and Bengali calendar starts from 593 CE suggesting that the starting reference year was adjusted at some point.

=== Akbar's influence ===
Crop cycle's depended on solar calendars. The Islamic lunar calendar of the Mughal government, before Akbar's era caused problems in tax collection since the lunar year was shorter than the solar year by about eleven days per year. Akbar commissioned his astronomer Fathullah Shirazi to develop a new syncretic calendar to allow land tax and crop tax collection according to the harvest cycles. In 1584, Emperor Akbar commissioned a new calendar as part of tax collection reforms.

Shirazi's new calendar was known as the Tarikh-e-Ilahi (God's Era). It used 1556 as the zero year, the year of Akbar's ascension to the throne. The Tarikh-e-Ilahi calendar were one of the syncretic reforms Akbar introduced, along with a new religion called Din-ilahi, a syncretic faith that integrated Islam and Indian religious ideas. However, Akbar's ideas were almost entirely abandoned after his death, and only traces of the Tarikh-e-Ilahi calendar survive in the modern Bengali calendar, according to Amartya Sen.

Shamsuzzaman Khan believed that Nawab Murshid Quli Khan was responsible for widely implementing the tax collection according to the Bengali calendar throughout Bengal. Khan promoted celebrations of the Punyaha, a ceremonial collection of land taxes. The calendar year became known as the Bangla san in Arabic and Bangla sal in Persian; both terms mean the Bangla Year.

=== Modern revisions and adoption ===
In 1966, a committee headed by Muhammad Shahidullah was appointed in East Pakistan to reform the traditional Bengali calendar and making it independent of Hindu astrological influences. It proposed the first five months 31 days long, rest 30 days each, with the month of Falgun adjusted to 31 days in every leap year. This was officially adopted by Bangladesh in 1987.

In 2018, the Bangladesh government planned to modify the Bangladeshi calendar again. The changes were done to match national days with West. As a result of the modification, Kartik started on Thursday (17 October 2019) and the dry season was delayed by a day as the revised calendar went into effect from Wednesday (16 October 2019).

== Months and seasons ==
The calendar has 12 months and 6 seasons, which are illustrated in the table below. The bolded dates indicate the 2018 revision of the calendar.

Bengali months		Days		Start date (from 2019)	Seasons
Bengali name	Romanization	1966/1987–2018	2019–present	Start date (from 2019)	Seasons
বৈশাখ	Bôiśākh	31	31	14 April	Summer (Grīṣmôkāl)
জ্যৈষ্ঠ	Jyôiṣṭhô	31	31	15 May	Summer (Grīṣmôkāl)
আষাঢ়	Āṣāṛh	31	31	15 June	Monsoon (Bôrṣākāl)
শ্রাবণ	Śrābôṇ	31	31	16 July	Monsoon (Bôrṣākāl)
ভাদ্র	Bhādrô	31	31	16 August	Autumn (Śôrôtkāl)
আশ্বিন	Āśbin	30	**31**	16 September	Autumn (Śôrôtkāl)
কার্তিক	Kārtik	30	30	17 October	Dry season (Hēmôntôkāl)
অগ্রহায়ণ	Ôgrôhāẏôṇ	30	30	16 November	Dry season (Hēmôntôkāl)
পৌষ	Pôuṣ	30	30	16 December	Winter (Śītkāl)
মাঘ	Māgh	30	30	15 January	Winter (Śītkāl)
ফাল্গুন	Phālgun	30 / 31 (leap year)	**29 / 30 (leap year)**	14 February	Spring (Bôsôntôkāl)
চৈত্র	Côitrô	30	30	15 March	Spring (Bôsôntôkāl)

== Weeks and days ==
The following illustrates the 7-day Bengali week. Bengali weekdays are named after deities of celestial bodies in the Surya Siddhanta, an ancient treatise on Indian astronomy. Bolded days indicate weekends.

Bengali days		Celestial body	Gregorian equivalent
Bengali name	Romanisation	Celestial body	Gregorian equivalent
**শনিবার**	**Śônibār**	Saturn (Śôni)	Saturday
রবিবার	Rôbibār	Sun (Rôbi)	Sunday
সোমবার	Sōmbār	Moon (Sōm)	Monday
মঙ্গলবার	Môṅgôlbār	Mars (Môṅgôl)	Tuesday
বুধবার	Budhbār	Mercury (Budh)	Wednesday
বৃহস্পতিবার	Br̥hôspôtibār	Jupiter (Br̥hôspôti)	Thursday
**শুক্রবার**	**Śukrôbār**	Venus (Śukrô)	Friday

== National calendar dates for the national holidays of Bangladesh ==
- Language Movement Day (21 February) – 8 Phalgun
- Independence Day (26 March) – 12 Coitro
- Bengali New Year (14 April) – 1 Boisakh
- July Uprising Day (5 August) – 21 Srabon
- Victory Day (16 December) – 1 Pous

== See also ==
- Indian national calendar – Solar calendar used in India
- Bangladesh Standard Time – Time zone used in Bangladesh
