= Seasons in Bangladesh =

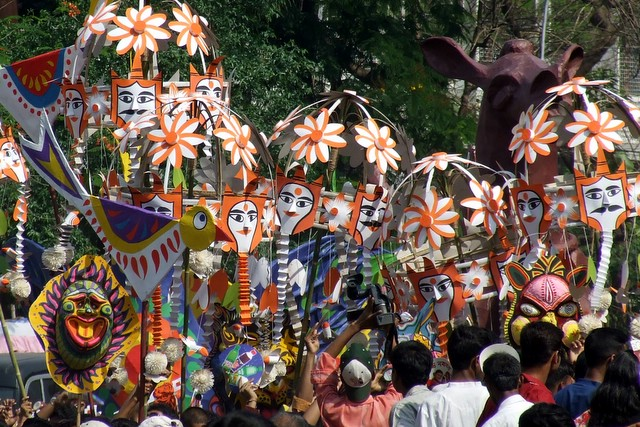
Pohela Boishakh celebrations in the season of Grishsho.

Bangladesh is the only country in the world to have a unique set of 6 seasons according to the Bengali calendar. These seasons are Grishsho (গ্রীষ্ম) or summer, Borsha (বর্ষা) or the monsoon, Shorot (শরৎ) or autumn, Hemonto (হেমন্ত) or the late autumn, Sheet (শীত) or winter and Boshonto (বসন্ত) or spring. Each season traditionally lasts for 2 months according to the Bengali calendar, but some seasons can last for shorter or longer. The calendar begins with the hot Grishsho, then monsoons feature in Borsha. Shorot and Hemonto are the equivalents to autumn and late autumn respectively. Sheet is the coldest season, and is equivalent to winter in Bangladesh. Boshonto is the final season in Bangladesh and represents spring.

Average temperatures for selected cities in Bangladesh °C (°F)
Country	City	Jan	Feb	Mar	Apr	May	Jun	Jul	Aug	Sep	Oct	Nov	Dec	Year	Ref.
Bangladesh	Chittagong	19.8 (67.6)	22.3 (72.1)	25.7 (78.3)	27.9 (82.2)	28.6 (83.5)	28.4 (83.1)	27.9 (82.2)	28.1 (82.6)	28.3 (82.9)	27.7 (81.9)	24.9 (76.8)	21.2 (70.2)	25.9 (78.6)	
Bangladesh	Dhaka	18.6 (65.5)	22.0 (71.6)	26.3 (79.3)	28.4 (83.1)	28.8 (83.8)	29.0 (84.2)	28.7 (83.7)	28.9 (84.0)	28.5 (83.3)	27.4 (81.3)	24.0 (75.2)	20.0 (68.0)	25.9 (78.6)	
Bangladesh	Khulna	18.2 (64.8)	21.8 (71.2)	26.3 (79.3)	28.9 (84.0)	29.5 (85.1)	29.2 (84.6)	28.7 (83.7)	28.9 (84.0)	28.6 (83.5)	27.6 (81.7)	24.0 (75.2)	19.5 (67.1)	25.9 (78.6)	
Bangladesh	Rangpur	16.3 (61.3)	19.2 (66.6)	23.4 (74.1)	26.1 (79.0)	27.4 (81.3)	28.4 (83.1)	28.6 (83.5)	28.9 (84.0)	28.0 (82.4)	26.2 (79.2)	22.2 (72.0)	18.2 (64.8)	24.4 (75.9)	
Bangladesh	Sylhet	18.5 (65.3)	20.5 (68.9)	24.1 (75.4)	25.8 (78.4)	26.7 (80.1)	27.4 (81.3)	27.7 (81.9)	28.1 (82.6)	27.6 (81.7)	26.4 (79.5)	23.2 (73.8)	19.6 (67.3)	24.6 (76.3)	

== Seasons in the calendar ==
Traditional Season in Bengal	Month name (Bengali)	Romanization	Days (Bangladesh, 2019–)	Start date (Bangladesh, 2019–)	Month name (Gregorian calendar)
গ্রীষ্ম (Grishshô); Summer	বৈশাখ	Boishakh	31	14 April	April–May
গ্রীষ্ম (Grishshô); Summer	জ্যৈষ্ঠ	Jyoishţho	31	15 May	May–June
বর্ষা (Bôrsha); Wet season/Monsoon	আষাঢ়	Ashaŗh	31	15 June	June–July
বর্ষা (Bôrsha); Wet season/Monsoon	শ্রাবণ	Shrabon	31	16 July	July–August
শরৎ (Shôrôd); Autumn	ভাদ্র	Bhadro	31	16 August	August–September
শরৎ (Shôrôd); Autumn	আশ্বিন	Ashshin	31	16 September	September–October
হেমন্ত (Hemonto); Dry season	কার্তিক	Kartik	30	17 October	October–November
হেমন্ত (Hemonto); Dry season	অগ্রহায়ণ	Ôgrohayon	30	16 November	November–December
শীত (Sheet); Winter	পৌষ	Poush	30	16 December	December–January
শীত (Sheet); Winter	মাঘ	Magh	30	15 January	January–February
বসন্ত (Bôsôntô); Spring	ফাল্গুন/ ফাগুন	Falgun/ Fagun	29 / 30 (leap year)	14 February	February–March
বসন্ত (Bôsôntô); Spring	চৈত্র	Choitro	30	15 March	March–April

== Grishsho ==
Grishsho (গ্রীষ্ম) is the first season of the Bengali calendar, lasting for the two months of Boishakh and Joishtho in the Bengali calendar and from mid-April to mid-June in the Gregorian calendar. Pohela Boishakh, the Bengali New Year, is celebrated at the start of Grishsho. Grishsho is the equivalent of summer and is a hot and dry season.

== Borsha ==
Borsha (বর্ষা) is the second season of the Bengali calendar, traditionally lasting for the two months of Asharh and Srabon in the Bengali calendar and from mid-June to mid-August in the Gregorian calendar. However, depending on the location Borsha can last all the way from Joishtho to Kartik (mid-May to mid-October). Borsha is the equivalent to the monsoon or wet season. In this season, the South Asian monsoon comes from the Bay of Bengal onto Bangladesh.

== Shorot ==
Shorot (শরৎ) is the third season of the Bengali calendar, lasting for the two months of Bhadro and Ashshin in the Bengali calendar and from mid-August to mid-October in the Gregorian calendar. Shorot is the equivalent of autumn in Bangladesh. The sky is mostly clear in Shorot punctuated by white clouds. Durga Puja is celebrated in this season.

== Hemonto ==
Hemonto (হেমন্ত) is the fourth season of the Bengali calendar, lasting for the two months of Kartik and Ogrohayon in the Bengali calendar and from mid-October to mid-December in the Gregorian calendar. It is the equivalent of late autumn in Bangladesh and is a transitional phase between Shorot and Sheet. This is the season when people harvest rice crops and paddies. There is heavy contrast between day and night temperatures, which creates heavy dew.

== Sheet ==
Sheet (শীত) is the fifth season of the Bengali calendar, lasting for the two months of Poush and Magh in the Bengali calendar and from mid-December to mid-February in the Gregorian calendar. This season is the equivalent of winter in Bangladesh and is a cold and dry season. Different regions get differing amounts of cold during the winter. The north end of Bangladesh is colder than the south.

== Boshonto ==
Boshonto (বসন্ত) is the sixth and final season of the Bengali calendar, lasting for the two months of Falgun and Choitro in the Bengali calendar and from mid-February to mid-April in the Gregorian calendar. Boshonto is the equivalent of spring in Bangladesh. While the season goes on for two months, the main part of Spring happens during March. Many flowers bloom during this season including krishnachura, shimul and palash.
