= Abdul Bashir =

Abdul Bashir may refer to:

- Abdul Bashir (murderer), 2023 Lisbon Ismaili Centre stabbing perpetrator
- Abdul Bashir (academic), Bangladeshi academic
- Abdul Malik Abdul Bashir (born 1968), Singaporean association football referee
