= Mangal Shobhajatra =

Mass procession in the Bengali New Year in Bangladesh

Mangal Shobhajatra Boishakhi Shobhajatra
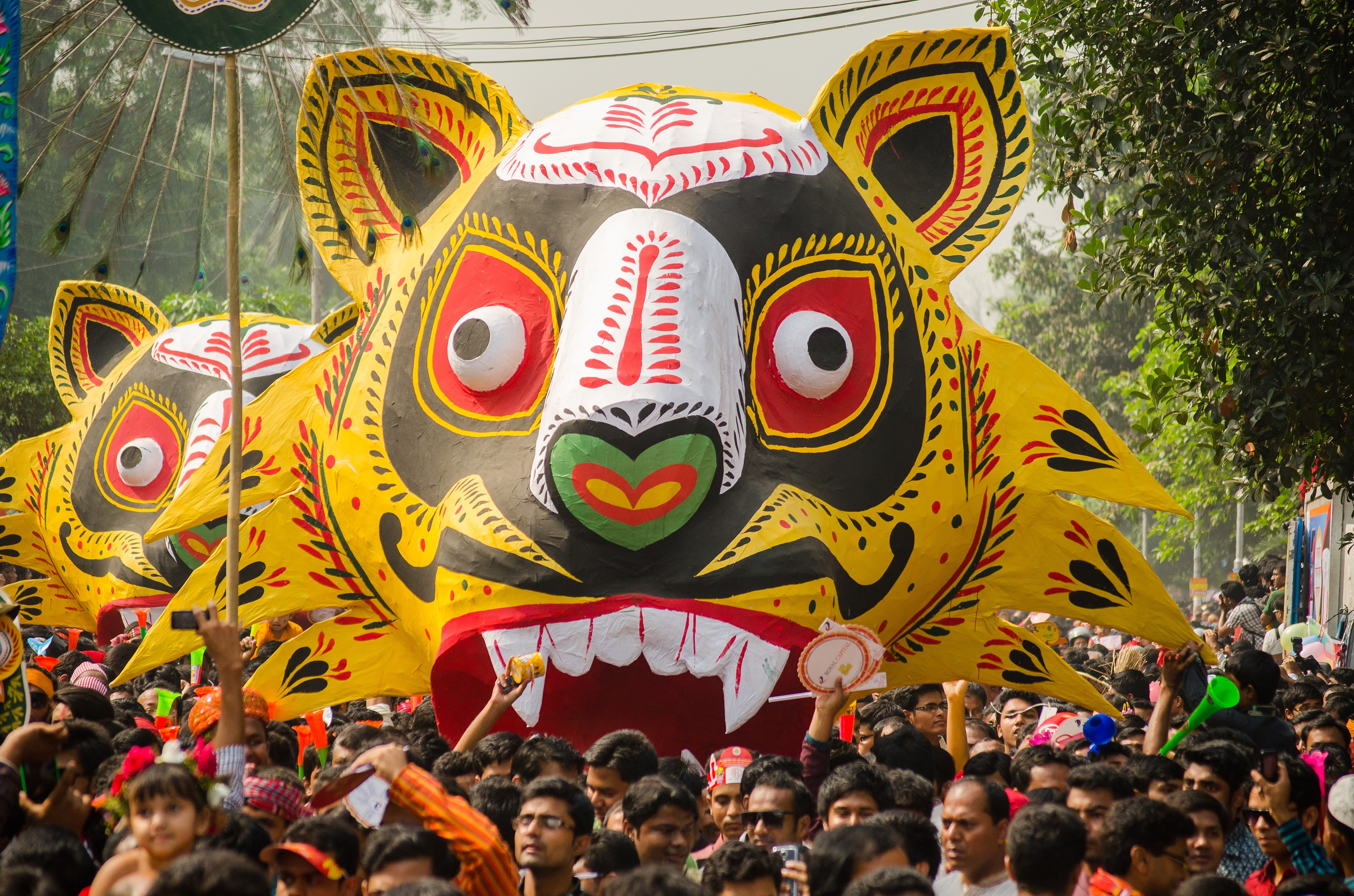
- Tiger motif in the Mangal Shobajatra, 2014
- Status: Active
- Genre: Procession
- Date: 14 April (First day of Bengali calendar)
- Frequency: Annually
- Location: Dhaka University campus
- Coordinates: 23.733242°N 90.3909218°E
- Country: Bangladesh
- Years active: 1989 – present
- Organiser: DU Faculty of Fine Arts; Ministry of Culture

Mangal Shobhajatra on Pahela Baishakh
- UNESCO Intangible Cultural Heritage
- Country: Bangladesh
- Reference: 01091
- Region: Asia and the Pacific

Inscription history
- Inscription: 2016 (11th session)
- List: Representative

Mangal Shobhajatra, (Note: Bengali: মঙ্গল শোভাযাত্রা, lit. 'Auspicious Parade') officially titled as Boishakhi Shobhajatra (Note: Bengali: বৈশাখী শোভাযাত্রা, lit. 'Boishakh's procession') since 2026 and Barshabaran Ananda Shobhajatra (Note: Bengali: বর্ষবরণ আনন্দ শোভাযাত্রা, lit. 'Joyous New Year Parade') in 1989–1996 and 2025, is a mass procession that takes place at dawn on the first day of the Bengali New Year in Bangladesh. The largest procession is organised by the teachers and students of the Faculty of Fine Arts of the University of Dhaka. The festival is considered an expression of the secular identity of the Bangladeshi people and as a way to promote unity. It was declared an intangible cultural heritage by UNESCO in 2016, categorised on the representative list as a heritage of humanity.

== History ==
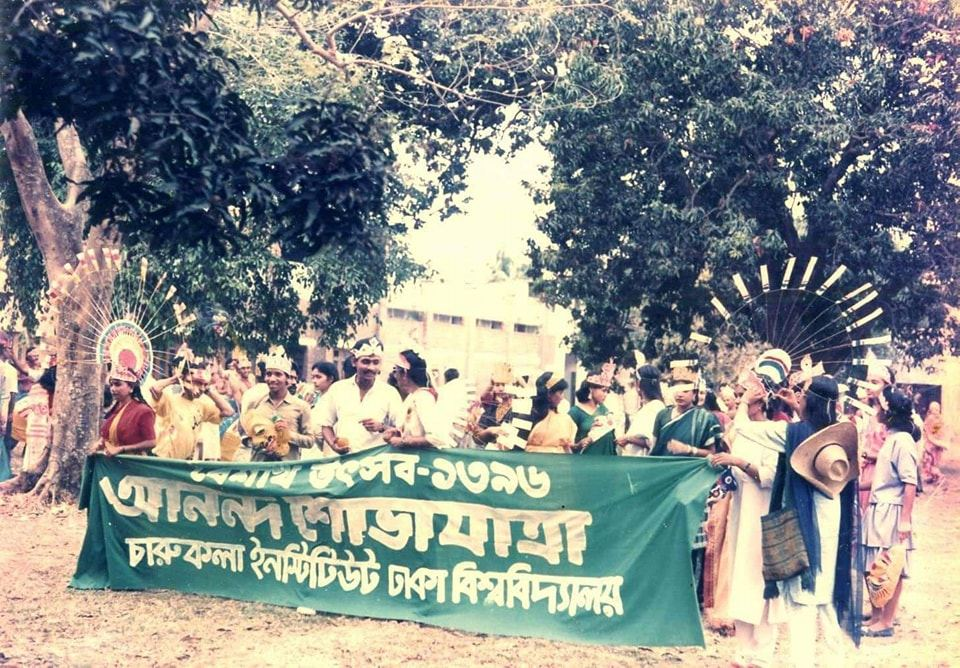
First Ananda Shobhajatra in 1989

The procession of the festival was first observed in 1986 at Jessore which was organized by Charupit a non government organization based in Jashore. In 1989, Fine Arts Institute of University of Dhaka started a similar events. Since then every year it organized by the Faculty of Fine arts of University of Dhaka. when the autocratic ruler Hussain Muhammad Ershad was the president of the country. He became the president of the country through a bloodless coup d'état. At that time, the country was under a military dictatorship and was suffering from floods. A mass uprising took place in Dhaka during which many people, including Noor Hossain, died. The students of the Dhaka University (DU) Faculty of Fine Arts decided to demonstrate against the regime by arranging the "Ananda Shobhajatra" on Pahela Baishakh. It was renamed "Mangal Shobhajatra" in 1996.

In March 2025, Cultural Affairs Adviser Mostofa Sarwar Farooki proposed rebranding the historic Mangal Shobhajatra for "inclusivity", but later clarified that no decision was made facing backlash from cultural figures like Mamunur Rashid and Aminul Hasan Litu. Critics argue that the name, deeply rooted in Bangali heritage and recognized by UNESCO, should remain unchanged, questioning the government's motive and possible fundamentalist influence. In the same time, the 26th batch of the Faculty of Fine Arts boycotted the upcoming Shobhajatra, claiming the event to be "politicalized", which was denied by Dean of the Faculty of Fine Arts Azharul Islam Sheikh.

On 11 April 2025, the Pohela Boishakh celebration central committee of DU officially decided to return to the original name "Barshabaran Ananda Shobhajatra". DU authorities claim that the renaming "represents a break from the legacy" of Sheikh Hasina's 15-year rule. However, several centre-left and left-wing organisations slammed the decision, arguing that "it risks erasing a symbol of Bangladesh's pluralistic tradition". Bangladesh Students' Union denounced the decision, calling it "surrender to the fascist communal mob".

In 2026, the Minister of Culture of the newly formed government, Nitai Roy Chowdhury, argued that it "wasn't necessary" to change the procession's name with the then-interim government's intervention. Following heavy debate on his remark, he declared to rename the event again as "Boishakhi Shobhajatra". He justified the decision saying:

We don't want any division. We want unity through diversity. In such situation, the government has decided that this year's Pohela Baishakh procession will not be named Ananda or Mangal, but will be named Boishakhi Shobhajatra.

== Celebrations ==
Every year, thousands of people take part in the procession that features gigantic replicas of birds, fish, animals, folk tale and other motifs. The rally symbolizes unity, peace, and the driving away of evil to allow progress of country and humanity. Sociopolitical symbols may also feature in the Shobhajatra, such as former prime minister Sheikh Hasina's demonic motif in 2025, watermelon motif as Palestine solidarity symbol, and signs protesting 2026 Iran war. 2025 Shobhajatra included 18-decorated police horse, reflecting the Sultanate and the Mughal heritage. 28 ethnic minorities in Bangladesh also joined for the first time in 2025. It is considered as an expression of the secular identity of all the Bangladeshi people, uniting the country irrespective of class, age, religious faith, ethnicity or gender.

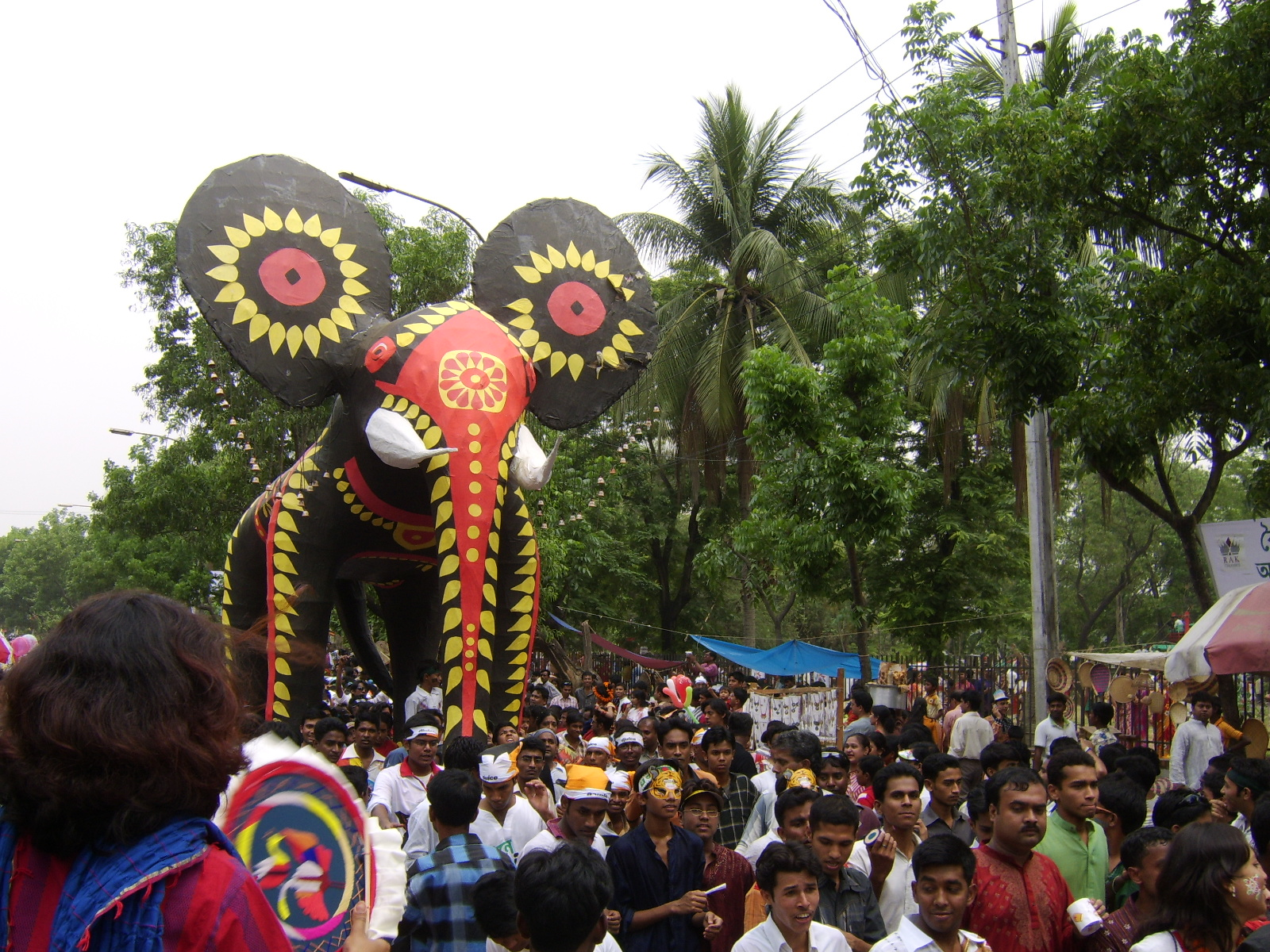
Elephant motif in the Mangal Shobhajatra, 2007

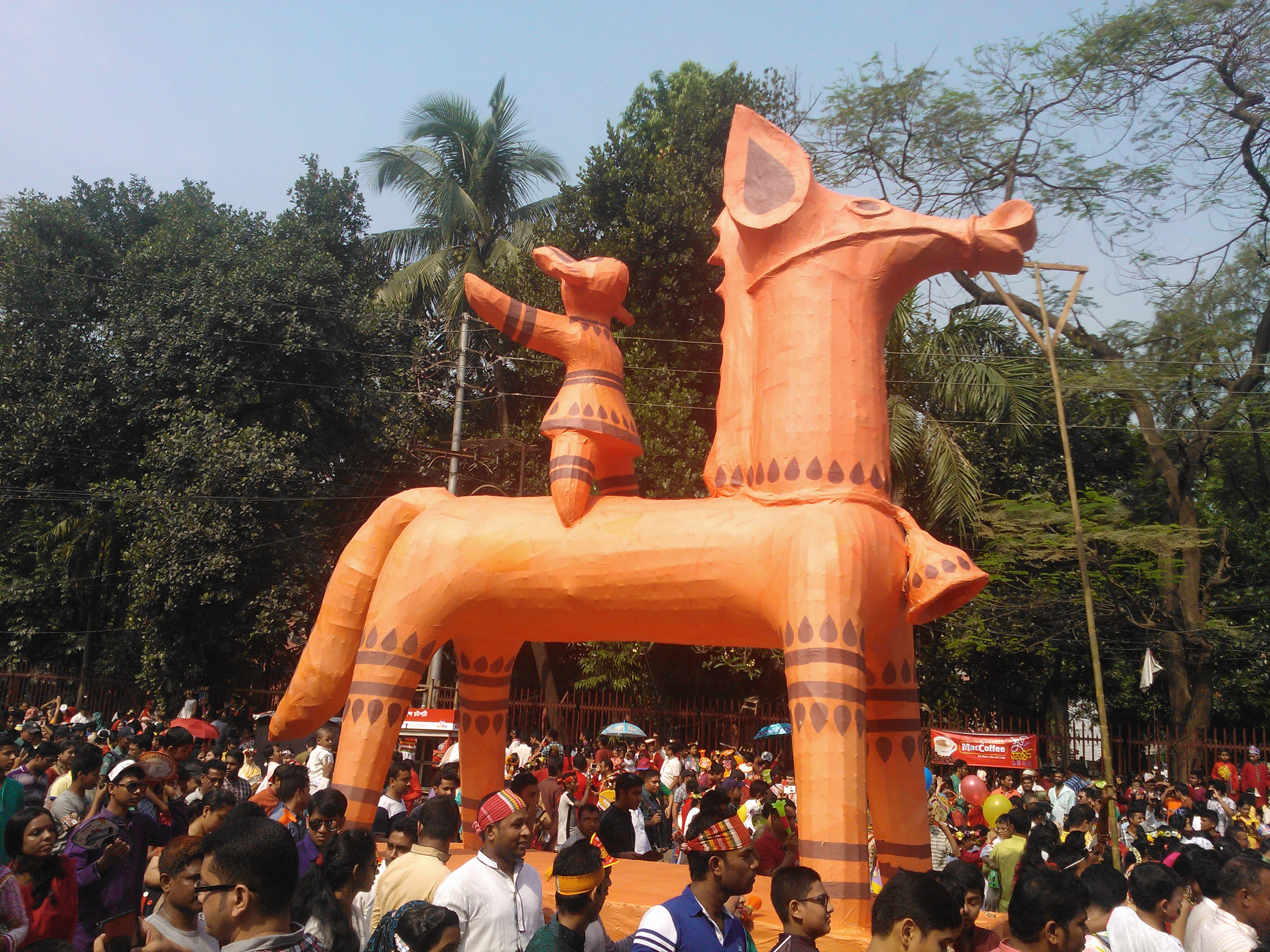
Horse motif in the Mangal Shobhajatra, 2015

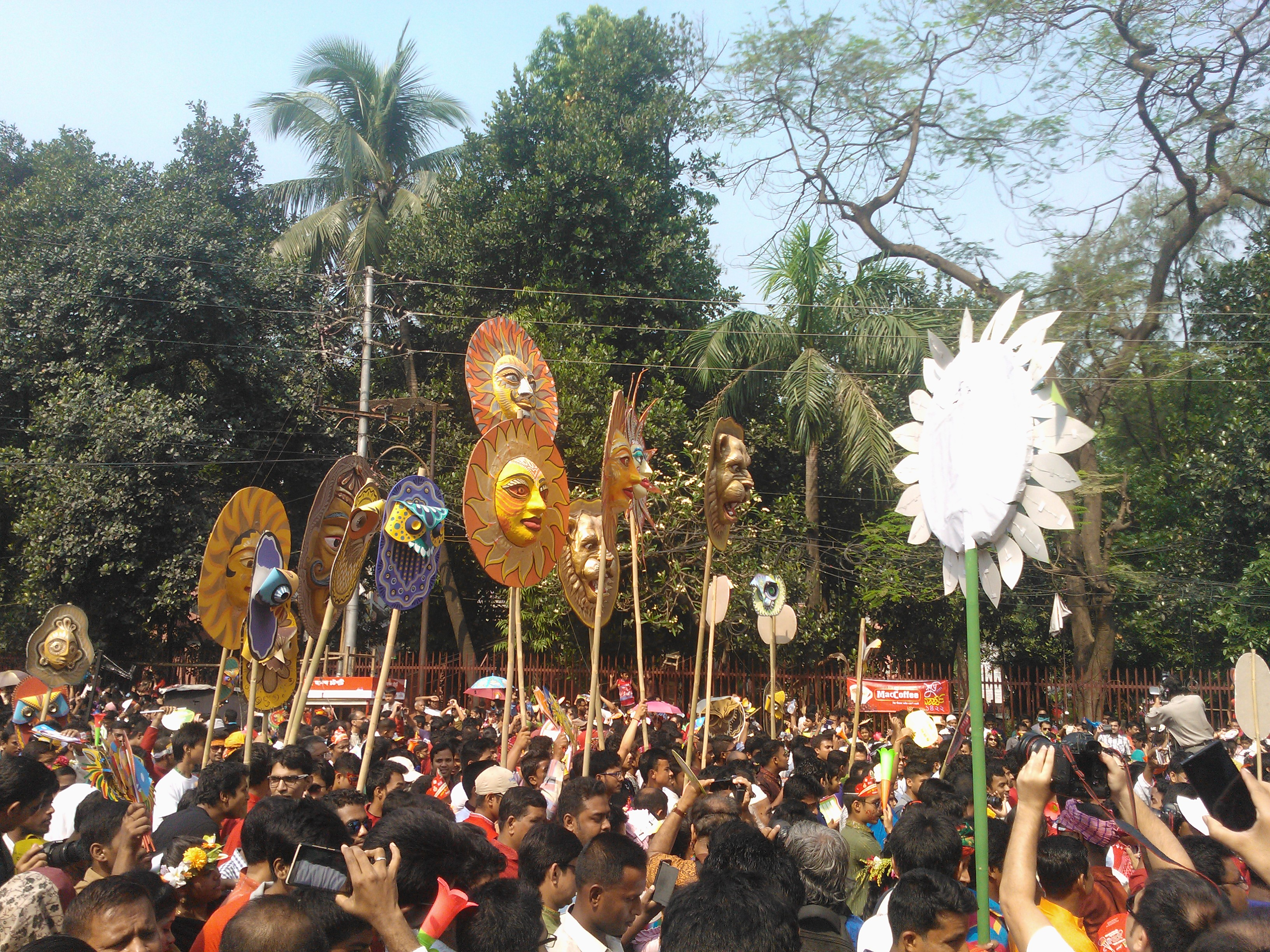
Sun motifs in the Mangal Shobhajatra, 2015

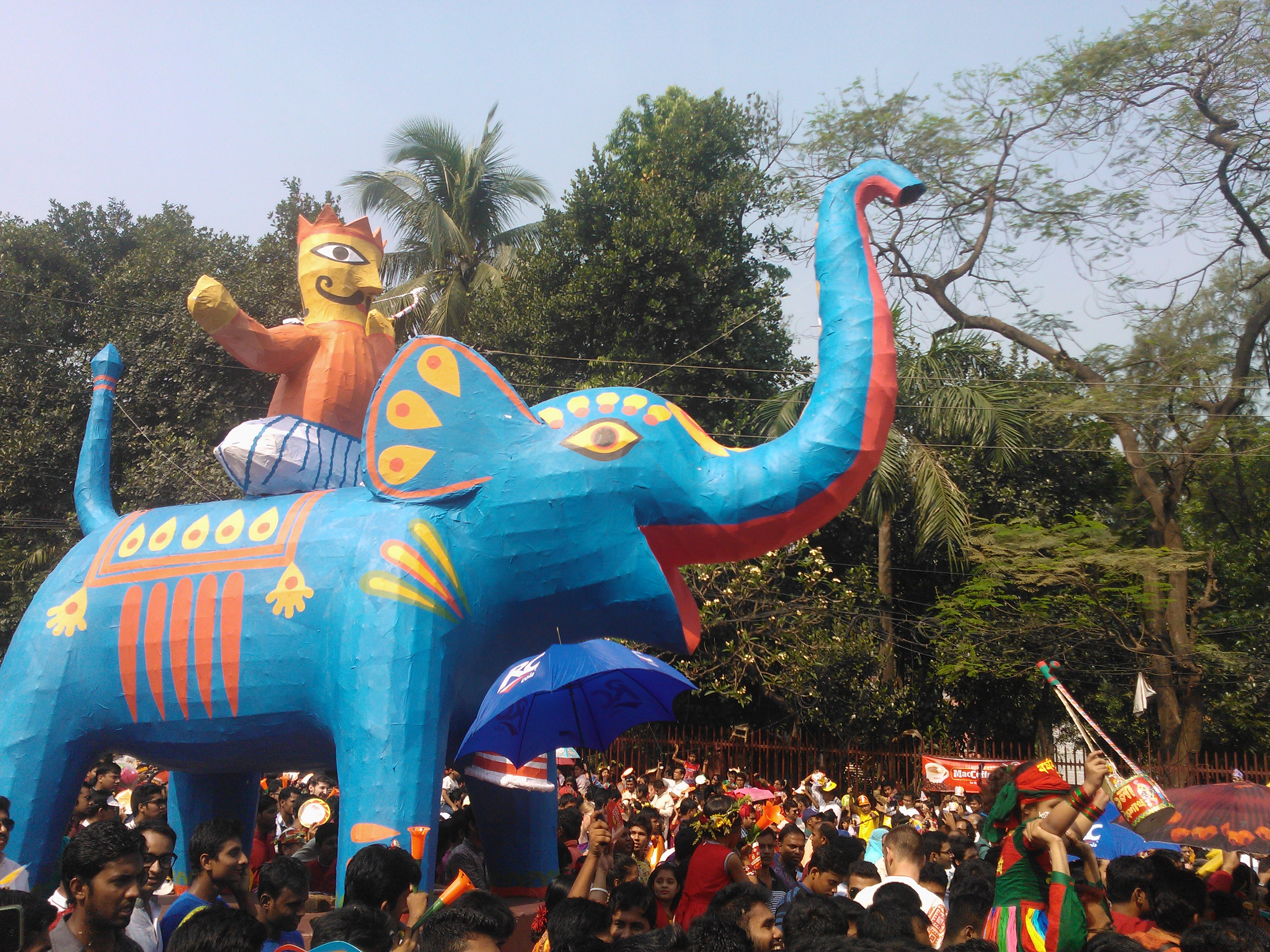
Elephant motif in the Mangal Shobhajatra, 2015

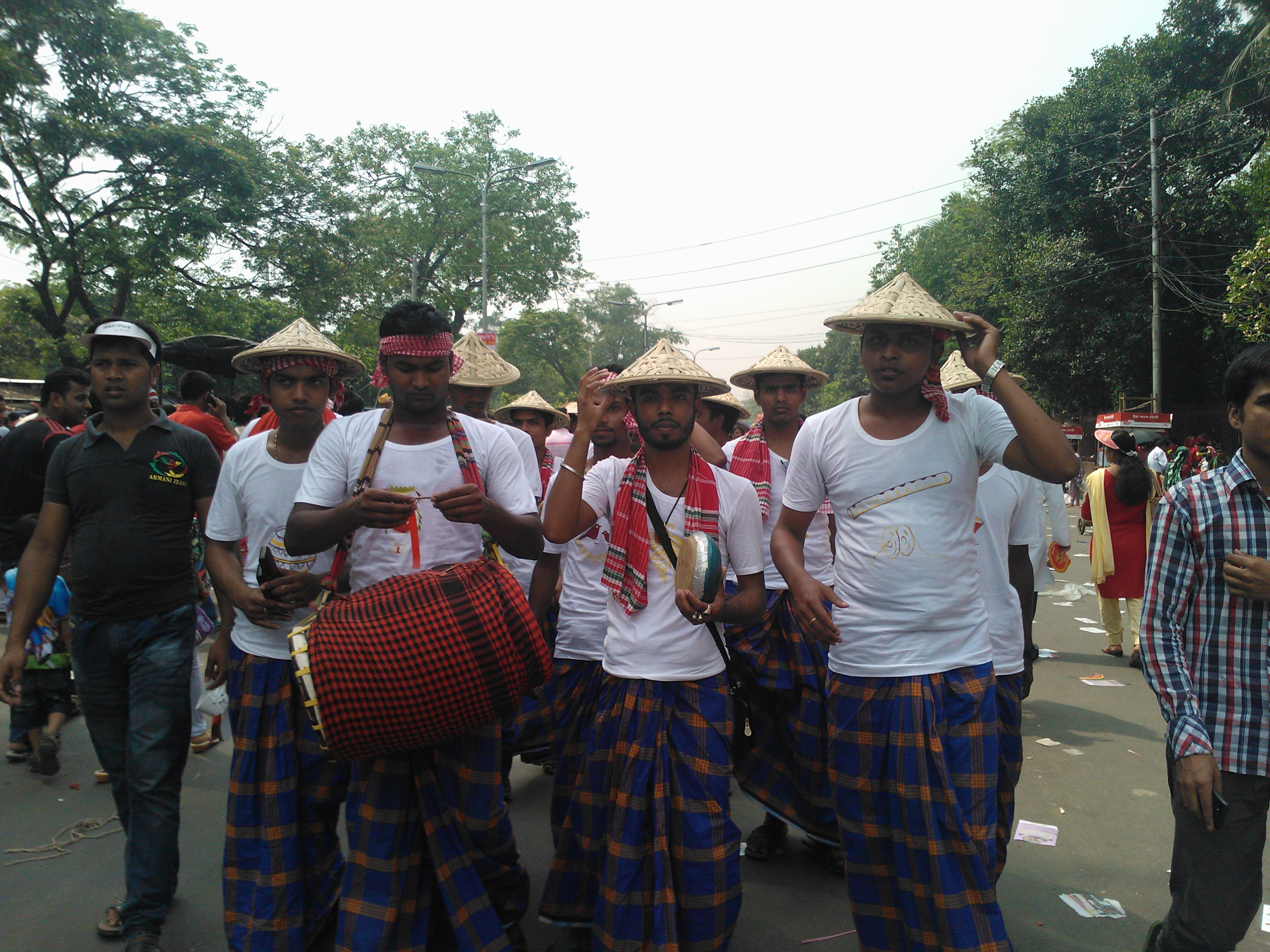
Youths dressed as farmers in the Mangal Shobhajatra, 2015

== UNESCO recognition ==
In 2014 the Bangla Academy compiled a nomination file that was approved by the Ministry of Cultural Affairs of Bangladesh and submitted to UNESCO. On 30 November 2016 the Mangal Shobhajatra festival was selected as an intangible cultural heritage by the Inter-governmental Committee on Safeguarding Intangible Cultural Heritage of UNESCO at its 11th session, which was held in Addis Ababa, Ethiopia.

== Controversy ==
In April 2023, Supreme Court lawyer Mahmudul Hasan sent a legal notice to the government arguing that the word mangal has connections to Hinduism as the word has Sanskrit roots. He also argued that the event's motifs offended Muslim religious sentiments, citing a part of the Bangladesh Penal Code that criminalize deliberate insult of the religious beliefs of the citizens. Following this notice, then Awami League government withdrew the mandatory Shobhajatra celebration for universities. In 2026, Hasan filed a writ at the High Court seeking to completely ban the procession citing the same reason.

== Outside Bangladesh ==
=== India ===
In 2017, following the footsteps of Bangladesh, the festive Mangal Shobhajatra was brought out in West Bengal.

== See also ==
- Culture of Bangladesh
- List of festivals of Bangladesh
- Boishakhi Mela
- Haal Khata
- Boli Khela
- Nouka Baich
- Pohela Falgun
