= Azharul Islam (disambiguation) =

Azharul Islam is a Bangladeshi Politician. It may also refer to:

- Azharul Islam Mannan, Bangladeshi politician
- A. T. M. Azharul Islam, Bangladeshi physician
- Azharul Islam Sheikh, Bangladeshi academic
