= Md. Rahmat Ullah =

- মোঃ রহমত উল্লাহ
- Born: Bangladesh
- Education: Baku State University; Kyiv State University
- Occupation: Professor of Law
- Employer: University of Dhaka
- Known for: Academic leadership, legal scholarship, human rights advocacy

Md. Rahmat Ullah is a Bangladeshi legal academic and professor of law at the University of Dhaka. He is the former chairman of the Department of Law at the University of Dhaka.

== Early life and education ==
Ullah obtained his bachelor's and master's degrees in law from the Baku State University in Azerbaijan in 1989 and 1990, respectively. He completed his Ph.D. at the Institute of International Relations under Kyiv State University in 1997. His doctoral dissertation focused on the international legal mechanisms of GATT/WTO activities.

== Career ==
Ullah began his professional journey in academia as a House Tutor at Shaheed Sergeant Zahurul Huq Hall, University of Dhaka, a position he held from 1990 until 2011. In December 2001, he was appointed Joint Unit Coordinator of the human rights and legal education organization Empowerment through Law of the Common People (ELCOP), and from 2002 to 2011, he served as its Coordinator and Director. He later became executive director of the organization, continuing until 2017.

In 2004, Ullah was elected to the Senate of the University of Dhaka, serving through 2009. During this period, he was also elected to the university's Syndicate, holding office from 2004 to 2009. Alongside his university responsibilities, he became a member of the governing body of Mohammadpur Mahila College, serving from 2008 to 2010. In 2009, he joined City University, Dhaka, as an adviser to the Department of Law, a position he retained until 2021.

In 2011, Ullah was appointed to the governing body of MH Samorita Hospital & Medical College, where he served until 2015. That same year, he assumed the role of Provost of Kabi Jashim Uddin Hall at the University of Dhaka, a position he held until 2019. He returned to elected leadership at the University of Dhaka in 2016, when he served as General Secretary of the Dhaka University Teachers’ Association. In 2017, he was elected Dean of the Faculty of Law, a position he continues to hold. That year, he also joined the Bangladesh Judicial Service Commission as a member, serving until 2022. Additionally, he served as President of the Rangpur Ex-Cadets’ Association and was re-elected to the University Senate (2017–2020) and the Syndicate (2018–2022).

Ullah was involved in national education quality reform through his roles as Additional Director of the Institutional Quality Assurance Cell (IQAC) at the University of Dhaka from 2017 to 2018 and as its Director from 2018 to 2022, under the World Bank-funded HEQEP project. Concurrently, he served on the governing body of Alhaz Mockbul Hossain College from 2016 to 2020. In the banking sector, Ullah served as an Independent Director of Mercantile Bank Limited from 2014 to 2020. From 2018 to 2020, he chaired the bank's Audit Committee. In 2021, he was appointed Chairman of Fareast Islami Life Insurance Company Limited, serving until February 2022.

In August 2023, the High Court Division bench of Justices Zafar Ahmed and Kazi Zinat Hoque annulled Dhaka University's decision to suspend Ullah from academic and administrative duties. He had been suspended in April 2022 after comments made during a Mujibnagar Day event were interpreted as praise for Khondaker Mostaq Ahmad. A committee led by Pro-VC ASM Maksud Kamal was formed to investigate the incident. The court's ruling reinstated his full duties at the university. The University of Dhaka filed an appeal against the High Court Division's verdict with the Appellate Division of the Bangladesh Supreme Court. A full bench of the Appellate Division, presided over by Justice Borhan Uddin, returned the verdict in favour of Ullah and upheld the High Court Division verdict.

Ullah was elected President of the Dhaka University Teachers’ Association for two consecutive terms in 2020 and 2021. In January 2024, he was appointed Chairman of the Department of Law at the University of Dhaka. After the fall of the Sheikh Hasina led Awami League government, he was forced to resign in the face of protests by students. He was suspended from his duties in the aftermath of campus unrest following the political shift on August 5. His tenure has been marked by past affiliations with faculty members and student groups across the political spectrum, including his reported support for the Chhatra League and his association with Law Adviser Asif Nazrul. The deans of the Faculty of Arts and the Faculty of Fine Arts at the University of Dhaka, Abdul Bashir and Nisar Hossain were also forced to resign.
