= Azharul Islam Sheikh =

Bangladeshi academic

Azharul Islam Sheikh Chanchal is a Bangladeshi academic and the dean of the Faculty of Fine Arts of the University of Dhaka. He is a professor in the department of ceramics at the Faculty of Fine Arts of the University of Dhaka.

== Early life ==
Sheikh completed his PhD at the University of Rajshahi.

== Career ==
Sheikh participated in the 11th Asian Art Biennale Bangladesh in January 2004, held at the Bangladesh Shilpakala Academy.

Sheikh, as a newly recruited teacher at the Institute of Fine Arts, was among four faculty members who, alongside Bangladesh Jatiotabadi Chatradal activists, attacked protesting students at the Institute of Fine Arts in June 2005. Armed with bamboo sticks, Azharul and his colleagues physically assaulted students, including slapping and punching female protesters. The attack, aimed at dispersing demonstrations against the vice chancellor and proctor, resulted in severe injuries, with some students reportedly missing. The Bangladesh Jatiotabadi Chatradal later took responsibility for the violence, justifying it as retaliation. This incident occurred amid growing concerns over declining academic standards at the University of Dhaka.

In February 2024, Sheikh did a solo exhibition of his sculptures at Mrittikanjali at Zainul Gallery 1. He dedicated the exhibition to the martyrs of the Bengali language movement and the Bangladesh Liberation War.

After the fall of the Sheikh Hasina-led Awami League government, Sheikh condemned the attacks and vandalism of sculptures throughout Bangladesh. The dean of the Faculty of Fine Arts of the University of Dhaka, Professor Nisar Hossain, and the dean of the Faculty of Arts, Professor Abdul Bachir, were forced to resign by the Students Against Discrimination for supporting the previous government and preventing the Quran recitation program at the campus. After his resignation, students performed Quran recitations and prayers. Sheikh was then appointed dean of the faculty of fine arts. The 26th batch of the Faculty of Fine Arts boycotted the Mangal Shobhajatra in 2025 due to it being politicized, which Sheikh denied. The event would include a 20-foot sculpture of Abu Sayeed, who died in protests against former prime minister Sheikh Hasina.
