= Indian national calendar =

Solar calendar used in India

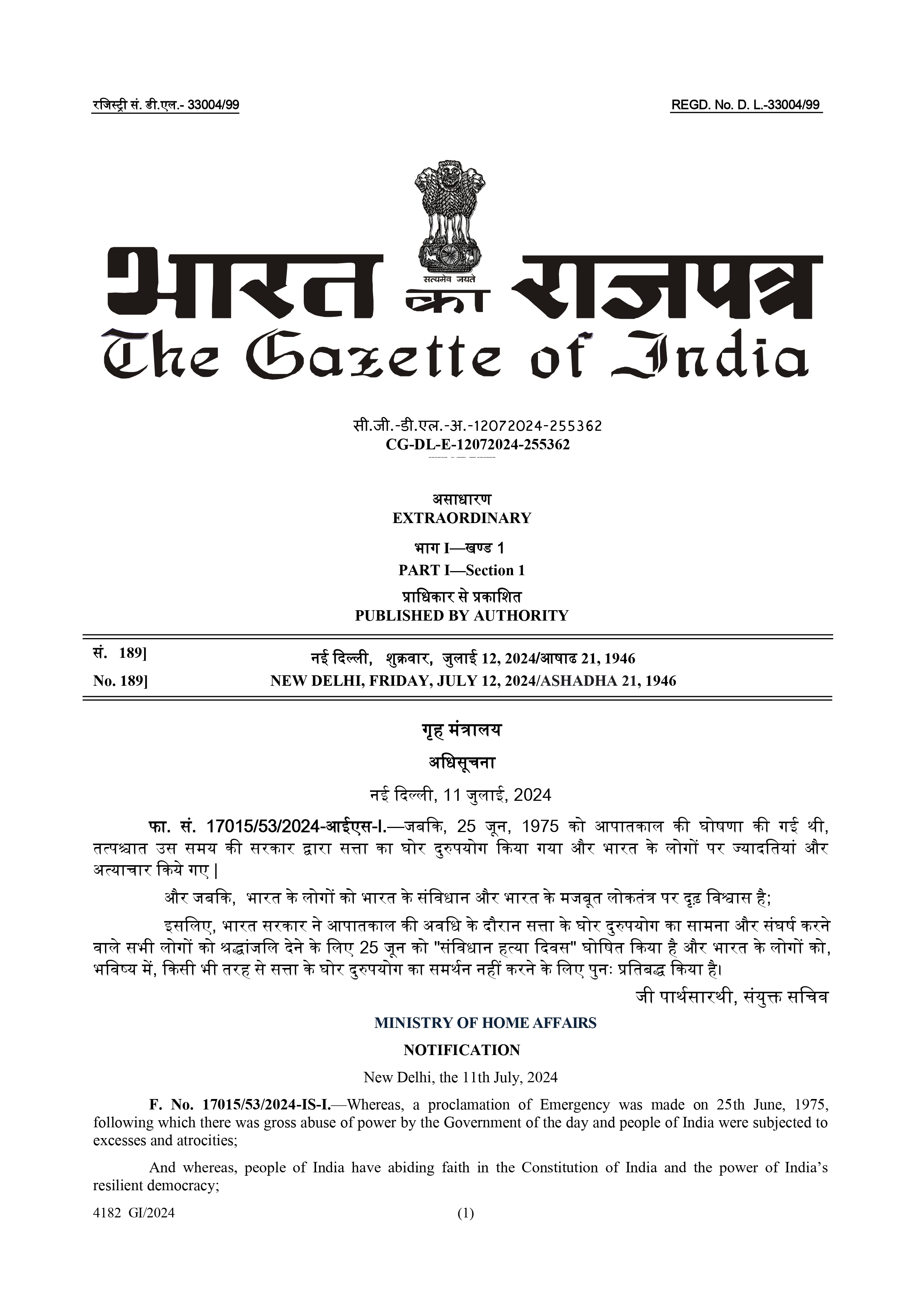
The Gazette of India is dated in both the Gregorian calendar and the Indian national calendar.

The Indian national calendar, also called the Shaka calendar or Śaka calendar, is a solar calendar that is used alongside the Gregorian calendar by The Gazette of India, in news broadcasts by All India Radio, and in calendars and official communications issued by the Government of India. It was adopted in 1957 following the recommendation of the Calendar Reform Committee.

Śaka Samvat is generally 78 years behind the Gregorian calendar, except from January–March, when it is behind by 79 years.

== Calendar structure ==
The calendar months follow the signs of the tropical zodiac rather than the sidereal zodiac normally used with the Hindu and Buddhist calendars.

#	Name	Length	Start date (Gregorian)	Tropical zodiac (Western)	Tropical zodiac (Sanskrit)
1	Chaitra	30 (31)	22 (21) March	Aries	Meṣa
2	Vaisakha	31	21 April	Taurus	Vṛśabha
3	Jyaishtha	31	22 May	Gemini	Mithuna
4	Ashadha	31	22 June	Cancer	Karkaṭa/Karka
5	Sravana	31	23 July	Leo	Siṃha
6	Bhadra	31	23 August	Virgo	Kanyā
7	Asvina	30	23 September	Libra	Tulā
8	Kartika	30	23 October	Scorpio	Vṛiścik‌‌‌a
9	Agrahayana or Margasirsha	30	22 November	Sagittarius	Dhanur
10	Pausha	30	22 December	Capricorn	Makara
11	Magha	30	21 January	Aquarius	Kumbha
12	Phalguna	30	20 February	Pisces	Mīna

Chaitra is the first month of the calendar and begins on or near the March equinox. Chaitra has 30 days and starts on 22 March, except in leap years, when it has 31 days and starts on 21 March. All months other than Chaitra start on fixed dates in the Gregorian calendar. The months in the first half of the year all average out to having 31 days, to take into account the slower movement of the sun across the ecliptic at this time. This is similar to the Iranian Solar Hijri calendar.

The names of the months are derived from the older Hindu lunisolar calendar, so variations in spellings exist, and there is a possible source of confusion as to what calendar a date belongs to. The traditional lunar calendar months were named based on the position of the Full Moon (opposite the Sun), thus the solar month names are derived from lunar nakshatra 180° from the position of the Sun.

The names of the weekdays are derived from the seven classical planets (see Navagraha). The first day of the week is Ravivāra (Sunday). The official calendar reckoned by the government of India has Sunday as the first and Saturday as the last day of the week.

Weekdays of the Shaka calendar
Ordinal number	Sanskrit weekday name	Sanskrit planet	Iconic image	English planet	English weekday
1	Ravivāra (Note: Ravivāra is also called Adivara.)	Ravi		Sun	Sunday
2	Somavāra	Soma		Moon	Monday
3	Maṅgalavāra	Maṅgala		Mars	Tuesday
4	Budhavāra	Budha		Mercury	Wednesday
5	Bṛhaspativāra (Note: Bṛhaspativāra is also called Guruvara.)	Bṛhaspati		Jupiter	Thursday
6	Śukravāra	Śukra		Venus	Friday
7	Śanivāra	Śani		Saturn	Saturday

Years are counted in the Shaka era, which starts its year 0 in the year 78 CE of the Common Era. To determine leap years, add 78 to the Shaka year – if the result is a leap year in the Gregorian calendar, then the Shaka year is a leap year as well.

== History ==
Senior Indian Astrophysicist Meghnad Saha was the head of the Calendar Reform Committee under the aegis of the Council of Scientific and Industrial Research. (Note: Other members of the Calendar Reform Committee were: A.C. Banerjee K.L. Daftari J.S. Karandikar Gorakh Prasad R.V. Vaidya N.C. Lahiri) It was Saha's effort which led to the formation of the committee in 1952. The task before the committee was to prepare an accurate calendar based on scientific study, which could be adopted uniformly throughout India. The committee had to undertake a detailed study of thirty different calendars prevalent in different parts of the country. The task was further complicated by the integration of those calendars with religion and local sentiments.

In 1954 the committee recommended a fixed tropical solar calendar for use as a unified national civil calendar, which was adopted as the Indian national calendar. A tropical lunisolar calendar was also proposed for religious purposes but this recommendation was not accepted.

India's first prime minister, Jawaharlal Nehru, in his preface to the Report of the committee, published in 1955, wrote:

"They (different calendars) represent past political divisions in the country ... . Now that we have attained Independence, it is obviously desirable that there should be a certain uniformity in the calendar for our civic, social, and other purposes, and this should be done on a scientific approach to this problem."

Usage started officially on 1 Chaitra 1879 Saka Era, or 22 March 1957. However, despite the government's attempts to propagate the calendar through official Rashtriya Panchangs, the Indian national calendar did not find acceptance with panchang makers or the general public, and current usage is largely limited to governmental offices. Existing calendars based on the Saka era remain in use, which can lead to confusion.

== See also ==
- Astronomical basis of the Hindu calendar
- Bengali calendar, a related Indic calendar
- Bangladeshi national calendar, a revised form of Bengali calendar used in Bangladesh
- Bisuddhasiddhanta Panjika
- Hindu calendar
- History of calendars
- Indian New Year's days
- Malayalam calendar
- List of calendars
- Solar Hijri calendar
- Ritu (Indian season)
- Shaka era
- Tamil calendar
- Vikram Samvat

== Sources ==
- Saha, M.N. (chairman); Banerjee, A.C.; Daftari, K.L.; Karandikar, J.S.; Prasad, Gorakh; Vaidya, R.V.; Lahiri, N.C. (1955). Report of the Calendar Reform Committee (PDF) (Report). New Delhi: Council of Scientific and Industrial Research – via dspace.gipe.ac.in.
- Richards, Edward Graham (1998). Mapping Time: The calendar and its history (illstd., reprint, rev. ed.). Oxford University Press. pp. 184–185. ISBN 978-0-19-286205-1 – via Google books.
