= Choitro =

Last month of the Bengali calendar

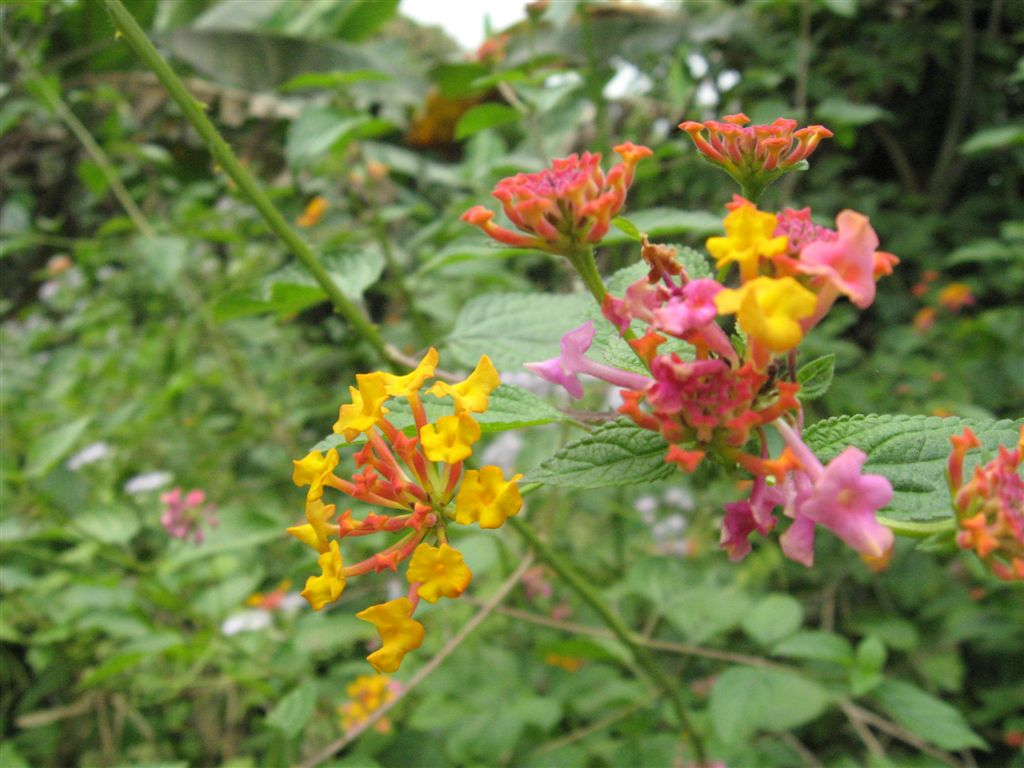
- The month of Choitro is known for colourful flowers
- Native name: চৈত্র (Bengali)
- Calendar: Bengali calendar
- Month number: 12
- Number of days: 30 (Bangladesh); 30/31 (India)
- Season: Bosonto (Spring)
- Gregorian equivalent: March-April
- Significant days: 12 Choitro - Independence Day (Bangladesh); 30 Choitro - Choitro Sankranti

Choitro (Bengali: চৈত্র) is the last month of the Bengali calendar. It falls from mid-March to mid-April and is the last month of spring (Bengali: বসন্ত, romanized: Bôsôntô). The name of the month is derived from the star Chitra (Bengali: চিত্রা).

== Culture ==
Traditionally this month is famous for what is called the "Choitro Sale" (চৈত্র সেল) when all shopping prices fall discounted all throughout the month. It is traditionally done in order to sell away all remaining products by the end of year, so that the Haal Khata (হালখাতা), the new account book can be opened on the New Year's Day.

Choitro Sankranti is observed on the last day of the month, marking the final day of the Bengali Calendar. It is celebrated more in rural areas than in urban areas, where it has been celebrated for hundreds of years. It is the day before Pohela Boishakh and it is more popular than Pohela Boishakh in rural areas.

Durga Puja in the Choitro month is observed as Basanti Puja, which is observed on the fifth day of the Chaitra Navratri. It is mainly celebrated in the Bengal Region, Assam, Tripura etc.

== Observances ==
- 9 Choitro - Basanti Puja
- 12 Choitro - Independence Day (Bangladesh)
- 30 Choitro - Choitro Sankranti
