= Nisar Hossain =

Nisar Hossain is a Bangladeshi academic and the former Dean of the Faculty of Fine Arts, University of Dhaka. It was during his tenure that the Mangal Shobhajatra, the celebration of Pohela Baishakh organised by the Faculty of Fine Arts, was recognised as an UNESCO Intangible Cultural Heritage of Humanity in 2017.

== Early life ==
Hossain was born in 1961 in Dhaka, East Pakistan, Pakistan. He obtained his Bachelor of Fine Arts degree in 1981 from the Department of Drawing and Painting at the University of Dhaka. He later earned his Master of Fine Arts degree in 1985 from the Department of Painting at Visva-Bharati University.

== Career ==
Hossain is a professor of the Department of Drawing and Painting in the Faculty of Fine Arts, University of Dhaka.

Hossain participated in international art exhibitions, residencies, or cultural programs in various countries, including Zimbabwe (1990), India (1994), Germany (1998), Sri Lanka (1999, 2012, and 2013), Denmark (2002), the United States (2009), and Japan (2011). He is acclaimed for using bold lines and vibrant colours to depict contemporary socio-political issues, including the rise of political Islam and historical violence in Bangladesh. His works, such as "The Assassin" (about the Assassination of Sheikh Mujibur Rahman) and "Killer-71," (about the Bangladesh Liberation War) critically explore national tragedies and power dynamics.

In February 2021, a retrospective exhibition of Hossain's work was held at Gallery Chitrak in Dhaka, featuring 80 mixed-media pieces. The exhibition highlighted Hossain's engagement with various social, political, and environmental themes, with notable works such as Oppressed 71, Diary of Hell-1, Towards Annihilation, and Killer in the Garden. He was the chairman of the jury committee at the 25th Berger Young Painters' Art Competition.

Hossain served three consecutive terms as the dean of the Faculty of Fine Arts. After a two-year pause due to the COVID-19 pandemic in Bangladesh in April 2022 , Pohela Baishakh celebrations resumed in Dhaka with renewed energy, with Hossain playing a central role in organising the iconic Mangal Shobhajatra as the Dean of the Faculty of Fine Arts at Dhaka University. For the first time, the procession was brought out from TSC instead of its traditional starting point at the Faculty of Fine Arts, due to metro rail construction. In December 2023, he expressed support for the 12th parliamentary elections.

After the fall of the Sheikh Hasina-led Awami League government, Hossain was forced to resign from the post of dean of the Faculty of Fine Arts in the face of Students Against Discrimination protests. Professor Abdul Bachir was forced to resign as dean of the Faculty of Arts. They were both accused of being members of the "Blue Panel" teachers' association, which the Awami League supports. Nisar Hossein, along with Rafiqunnabi, a cartoonist, played a major role in generating consent to shoot the protestors involved in the Anti-discriminatory Movements on the face of the July Uprising. He was replaced by Azharul Islam Sheikh.
