= Abdul Bashir (academic) =

Bangladeshi academic

Abdul Bashir is a Bangladeshi academic and former Dean of the Faculty of Arts at the University of Dhaka.

== Early life ==
Bashir completed his bachelor's, master's, and PhD at the University of Dhaka.

== Career ==
As chairman of the Provost Standing Committee, Bashir played a key role in overseeing the phased reopening of the University of Dhaka's residential halls in October 2021, after a prolonged closure due to the COVID-19 pandemic in Bangladesh. In February 2022, as Provost of Bijoy Ekattor Hall at Dhaka University, Bashir oversaw disciplinary action against three members of the Bangladesh Chhatra League accused of bullying and mentally torturing a first-year student. Following an investigation by a hall-appointed probe committee, the students were suspended from the hall for six months.

Bashir was the provost of Bijoy Ekattor Hall at the University of Dhaka. While serving as Provost of Bijoy Ekattor Hall at the University of Dhaka, he confirmed the formation of a probe committee following allegations of hazing and mental torture of a first-year student in the hall's guest room. According to the student's complaint, a group of senior students, reportedly affiliated with the Bangladesh Chhatra League, forced him to stare at a bright light for over ten minutes, causing him to lose consciousness and require hospitalisation. The incident sparked campus-wide protests and prompted calls for disciplinary action against the perpetrators. He was the chief coordinator of the Arts, Law and Social Sciences Unit.

In 2023, Bashir, then dean of the Faculty of Arts at Dhaka University, was involved in the controversy surrounding the cancellation of a discussion on the national curriculum planned by the Dhaka University Teachers Network. The event was abruptly canceled at the last moment by university authorities, with Bashir citing instructions from a “special place” and concerns over the discussion being anti-government. The cancellation drew criticism from academics who argued it violated the Dhaka University Order of 1973 and curtailed freedom of speech. The discussion was subsequently relocated off-campus and followed by a protest rally.

In October 2023, Bashir faced criticism for serving on a lecturer recruitment board for the Department of Persian Language and Literature at Dhaka University, which included Professor Bahauddin, a faculty member previously barred by the DU Syndicate in 2022 from participating in exam-related activities for three years due to allegations of mark tampering. Despite the restriction, Bahauddin was cleared to participate, leading to allegations of procedural irregularities and administrative pressure.

After the fall of the Sheikh Hasina-led Awami League government in August 2024, Bashir resigned from his position as Dean of the Faculty of Arts at the University of Dhaka following student protests. Demonstrators accused him of suppressing student activities, including a Quran recitation event during Ramadan, and criticized his leadership style as authoritarian. The protests culminated in a demonstration at the Arts Building, where students demanded his resignation. The students read the Quran at his office after accusing him of Islamophobia. His resignation, carried out amid public demonstrations and widely circulated online, became a flashpoint in broader debates on secularism, academic freedom, and the role of religion in post-Hasina Bangladesh. Some observers described the incident as emblematic of growing intolerance toward secular figures in the wake of political change. The dean of the Fine Arts Faculty Nisar Uddin and dean of the Department of Law Md. Rahmat Ullah were also forced to resign.
