= Joishtho =

2nd month of the Bengali calendar

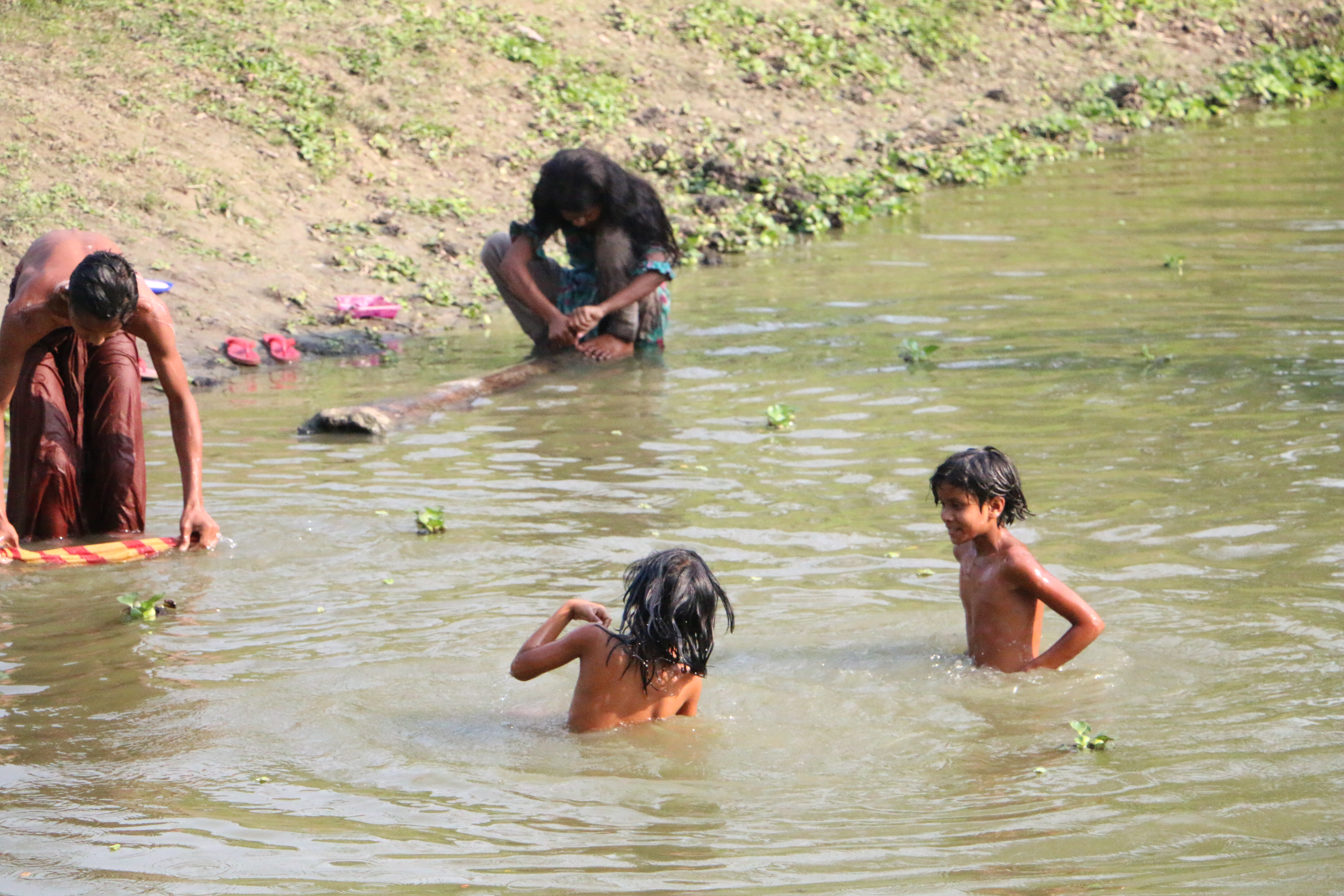
- Joishtho is one of the hottest months of the year in Bangladesh and Bengal
- Native name: জ্যৈষ্ঠ (Bengali)
- Calendar: Bengali calendar
- Month number: 2
- Number of days: 31 (Bangladesh); 31/32 (India)
- Season: Grishsho (Summer)
- Gregorian equivalent: May-June

Joishtho (Bengali: জ্যৈষ্ঠ, romanized: Jyôishţhô or Bengali: জৈষ্ঠ্য, romanized: Jôishţhyô, colloquially জেঠ Jeţh or জৈঠ Joiţh) is the second month and the last month of summer in the Bengali calendar. This month lasts from 15/16 May to 14/15 June.

== Etymology ==
The name of the month is derived from the star Jyestha, which is the 18th nakshatra or lunar mansion in Hindu astronomy and Vedic astrology associated with the string of the constellation Scorpii. It is the constellation visible on the meridian at midnight from the Indian sub-continent during this month.

== Observances marked (per official use in Bangladesh) ==
- 11 Joishtho – The birthday of national poet Kazi Nazrul Islam
