= Boishakh =

1st month of the Bengali calendar

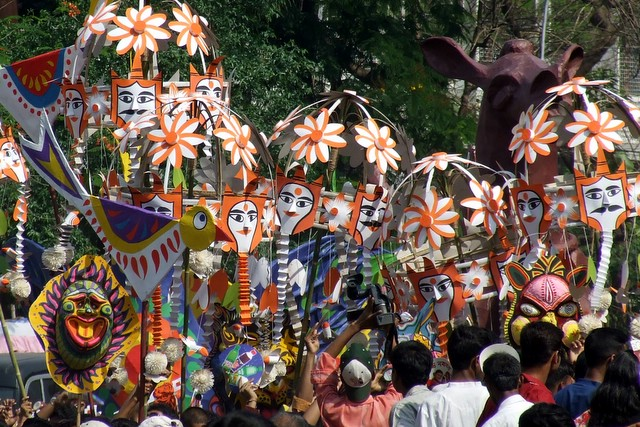
- Pohela Boishakh celebration in Dhaka
- Native name: বৈশাখ (Bengali)
- Calendar: Bengali calendar
- Month number: 1
- Number of days: 31 (Bangladesh); 30/31 (India)
- Season: Grishsho (Summer)
- Gregorian equivalent: April–May
- Significant days: Pohela Boishakh

Boishakh (Bengali: বৈশাখ, Nepali: बैशाख, Bôishakh, Baishakh) is the first month in the Bengali calendar and Nepali calendar. This month typically lies between mid-April and mid-May.

== Etymology ==
The name of the month is derived from the position of the Sun near the star Bishakha (বিশাখা).

== History ==
The first day of Boishakh is celebrated as the Pôhela Bôishakh or Bengali New Year's Day. The day is observed with cultural programs, festivals and carnivals all around the country. The day is also the beginning of all business activities in Bangladesh and in the neighboring Indian states of West Bengal and Tripura. The traders start new fiscal account books called Haal Khata (Bengali: হালখাতা). The accounting in the Haal khata begins only after this day. It is celebrated with sweets and gifts offered to customers.

== Season ==
The month of Boishakh also marks the official start of Summer. The month is known for the afternoon storms called Kalboishakhi (Nor'wester). The storms usually start with strong gusts from the north-western direction at the end of a hot day and cause widespread destruction.

== Agriculture ==
Boishakh is the month when many of the seasonal fruits, especially mango, watermelon, and jackfruit become available. Green unripe mangoes are a particular delicacy of the month.

== Observances marked (per official use in Bangladesh) ==
- 1 Boishakh - Pohela Boishakh
