= Magh (Bengali calendar) =

Tenth month of the Bengali calendar

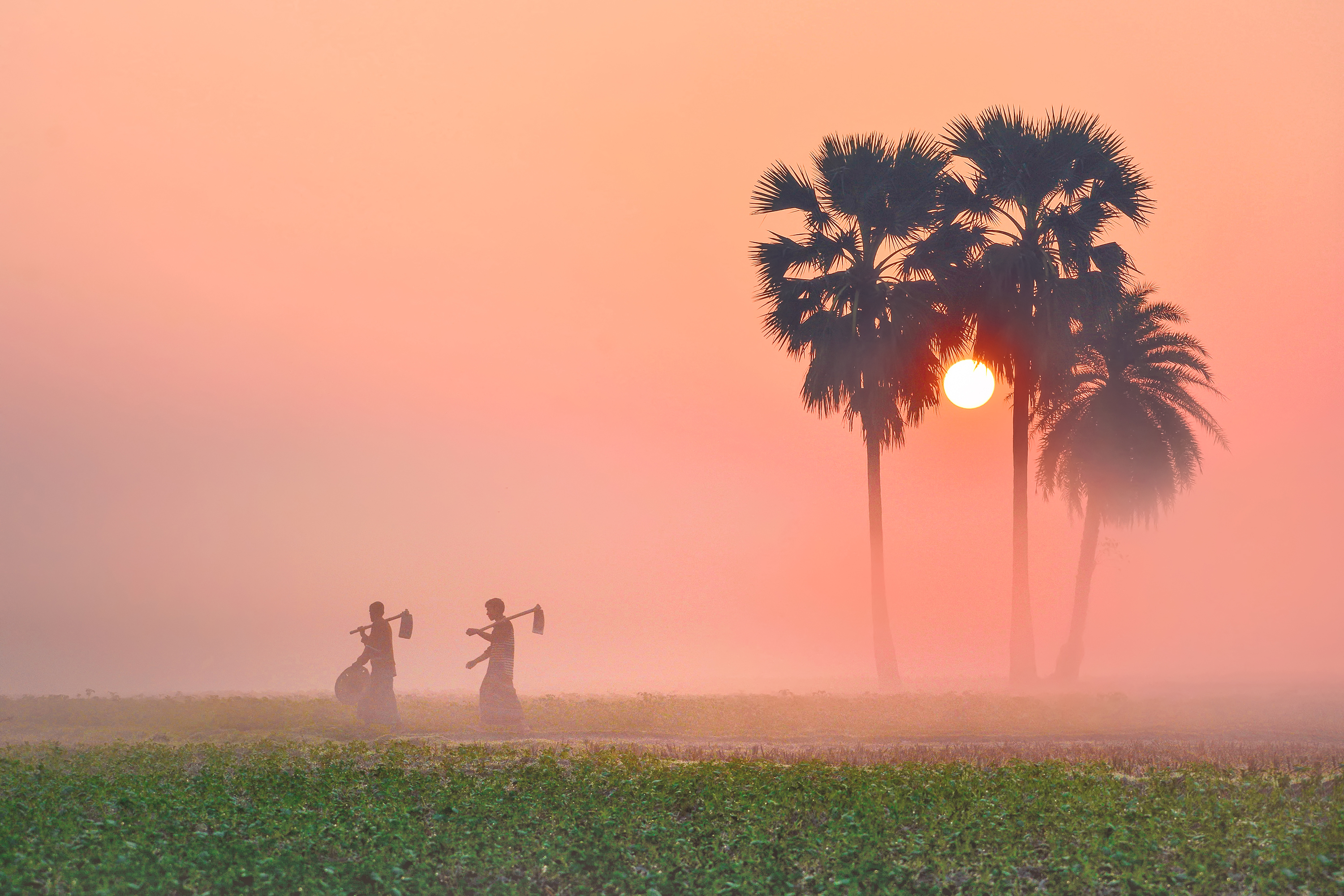
- The month of Magh features foggy winter mornings in Bangladesh and Bengal
- Native name: মাঘ (Bengali)
- Calendar: Bengali calendar
- Month number: 10
- Number of days: 30 (Bangladesh); 29/30 (India)
- Season: Sheet (Winter)
- Gregorian equivalent: January-February
- Significant days: Maghi Purnima

Magh (Bengali: মাঘ) is the tenth month in the Bengali calendar. This is the last month of the two months that make up the winter season. This month corresponds with January and February in the Gregorian calendar.

== Etymology ==
This month is named after the star Magha (মঘা Môgha).

== Festivals ==
- Maghi Purnima: a Buddhist festival on the full moon night of this month
- Suryavrata: a vrata observed by Hindu women usually who are unmarried, on the first day of this month
- Saraswati puja: Hindu festival in honor of the Goddess Saraswati observed on the fifth lunar day in this month, popular in Bangladesh, and the Indian states of Assam and West Bengal.

== Observances ==
- Republic Day of India - 12 Magh (India), 11 Magh (Bangladesh)
