= Haal Khata =

Festival celebrated by Bengali

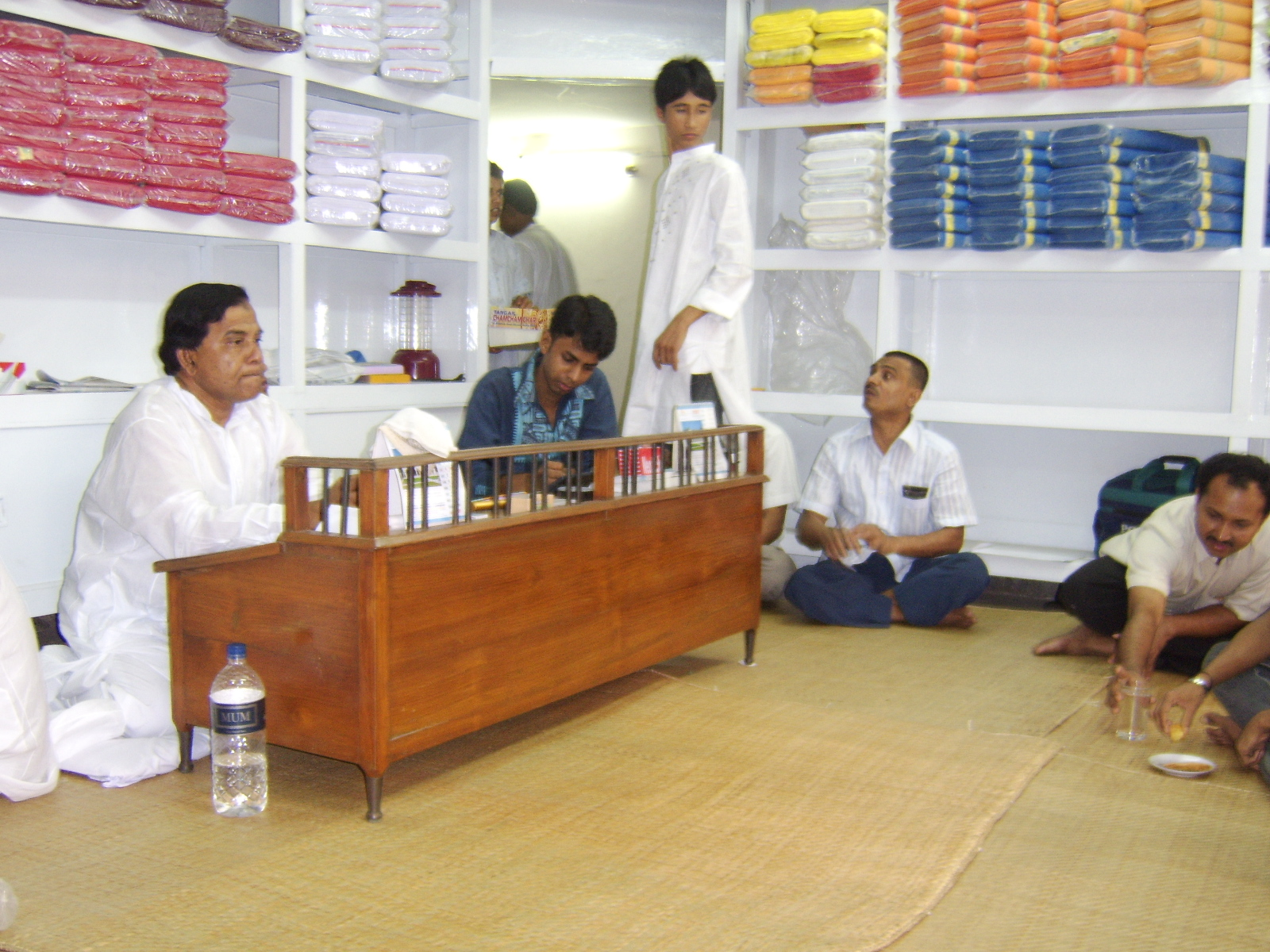
Haal Khata

Haal Khata (Bengali: হালখাতা) is a festival celebrated by Bengali merchants, shopkeepers and traders on Pohela Boishakh (the first day of the Bengali Calendar) by opening a new ledger.

== History ==
Mughal emperor Akbar established a new calendar based on the old solar Bengali calendar in 1584 to ease taxation. The Mughals used "Halkhata Mahurat" to collect taxes and the tradition of Haal Khata is believed to be originated from this. Haal Khata is a Bengali tradition that is over 430 years old. Haal means updating and Khata means ledger.

== Celebrations ==
On the first day of the Bengali year, traders close old ledgers and open a new ledger for the new year. Customers are invited to settle old debts and start fresh. On this day, Muslim businessmen start anew by writing 'Bismillah' or 'Elahi Bharsa' in their new account books and marks the event by Haal Khata dawat. The event is marked by a special Puja by the Hindu traders & shopkeepers. Seeking to improve their relationship with customers, traders give sweets, snacks, or gifts to them. The festival is celebrated in Bangladesh and West Bengal, Assam's Barak Valley and Tripura of India. It is believed to bring good luck to the business.
