= Pohela Boishakh =

Bengali new year

Pohela Boishakh পহেলা বৈশাখ
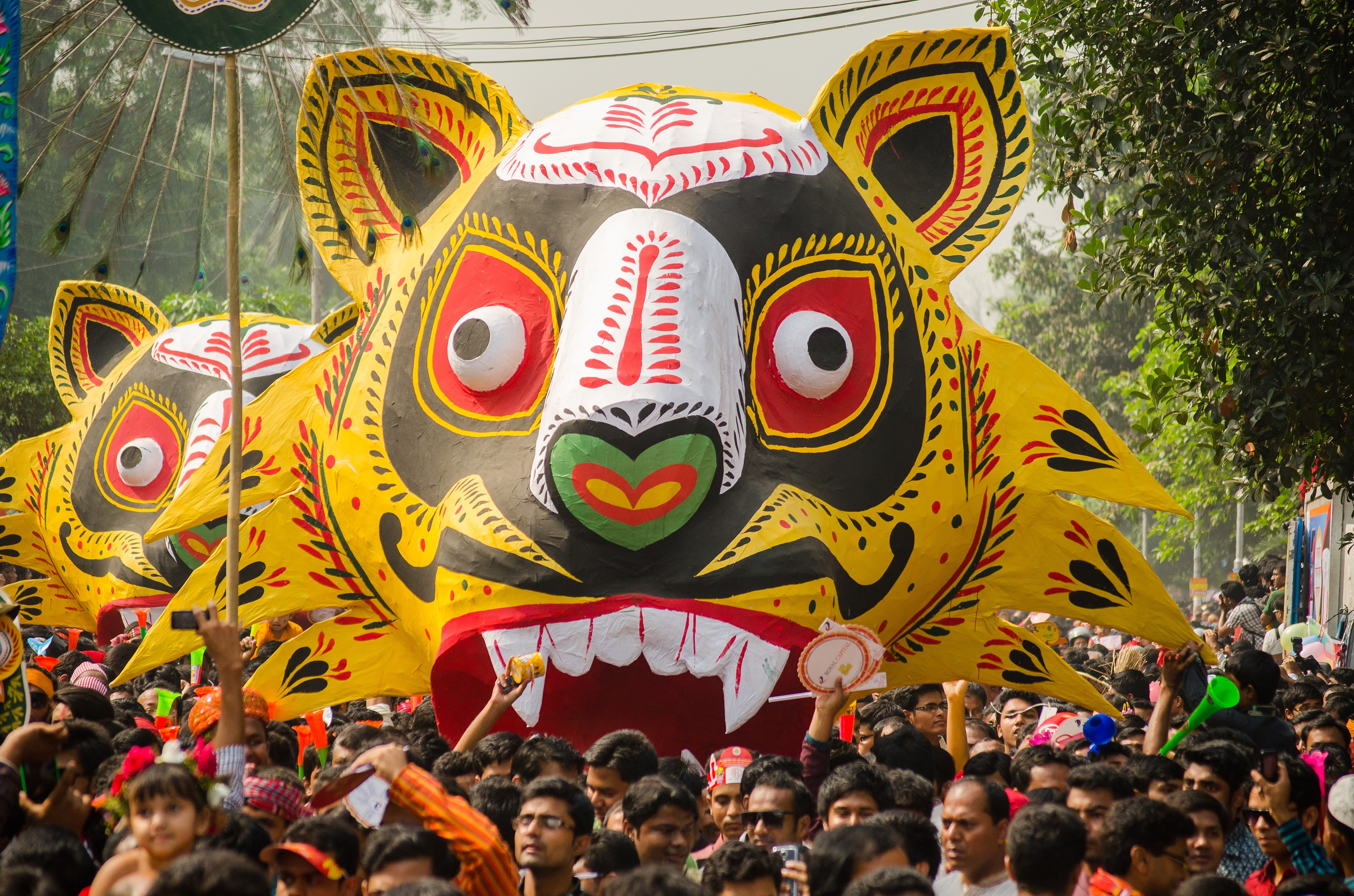
- Mangal Shobhajatra at Pohela Baishakh celebration in Dhaka, Bangladesh
- Official name: Pohela Boishakh
- Also called: Pahela Baishakh, Poila Boishakh, Pahela Boishak, Poila Boishak, Poila Baishak (Note: Alternative English transliterations of the name include "Pahela Baishakh", "Pahela Boishak" and "Poila Boishak".)
- Observed by: Bengalis
- Type: Social, cultural and national festival
- Significance: Start of new year in Bengali calendar
- Celebrations: Boishakhi Mela (fair), processions, gift-giving, visiting relatives and friends, cultural programmes
- Date: 14 April (Bangladesh); 14 or 15 April (India)
- Frequency: Annual
- Related to: South and Southeast Asian solar New Year

Mangal Shobhajatra on Pahela Baishakh
- UNESCO Intangible Cultural Heritage
- Country: Bangladesh
- Reference: 01091
- Region: Asia and the Pacific

Inscription history
- Inscription: 2016 (11th session)
- List: Representative

Pohela Boishakh (Bengali: পহেলা বৈশাখ or পয়লা বৈশাখ) is the Bengali New Year celebrated by the Bengali people worldwide and as a holiday on 14 April in Bangladesh and 15 April or 14 April (depending on whether the Sun enters Aries before or after midnight in a given year) in the Indian states of West Bengal, Tripura (Note: Not to be confused with the Tripuri New Year), Jharkhand and Assam (Note: Not to be confused with the Assamese New Year) (Goalpara and Barak Valley). It is a festival based on the spring harvest—which marks the first day of the new year in the Bengali calendar.

The festival is celebrated with processions, fairs and family time. The traditional greeting for Bengalis in the new year is শুভ নববর্ষ (Shubho Noboborsho) which is literally "Happy New Year". The festive Mangal Shobhajatra is organised in Bangladesh. In 2016, UNESCO recognised this festivity organised by the Faculty of Fine Arts at the University of Dhaka, as an Intangible Cultural Heritage of Humanity.

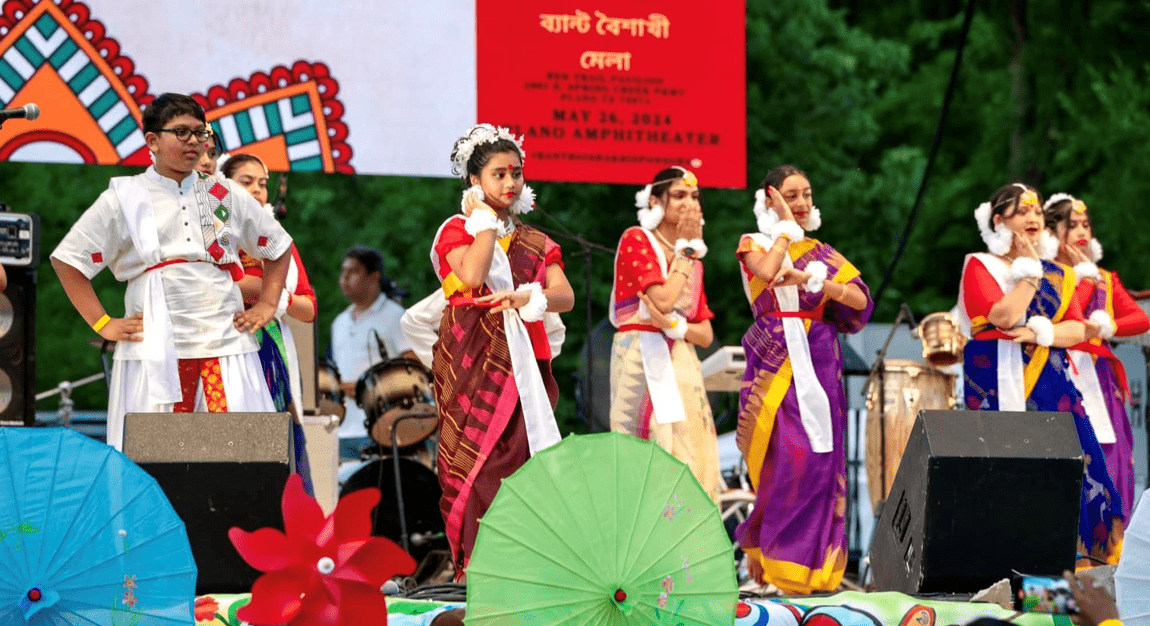
Boishakhi celebrations by Bengali Americans at Dallas, Texas, USA (2024)

== History and origin ==
=== Nomenclature ===
In Bengali, the word Pohela (or Pahela Bengali: পহেলা), alternatively Poila (Bengali: পয়লা), means 'first' and Boishakh (from Vaishakha, (Note: The name of the month is derived from the position of the Moon near the Vishākhā nakshatra (star) on the full moon day.) Bengali: বৈশাখ) is the first month of the Bengali calendar (Bengali: পহেলা বৈশাখ Pohela Boishakh, Pahela Boishakh, Pahale Baishak or Bengali: পয়লা বৈশাখ Poila Boishakh).

Bengali New Year is referred to in Bengali as Nobo Borsho (Bengali: নববর্ষ), where 'Nobo' means new and 'Borsho' means year.

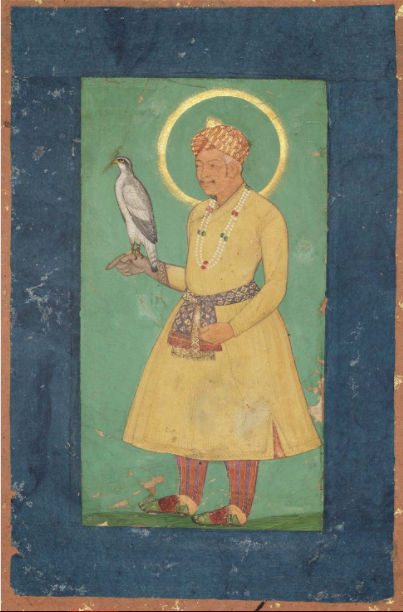
Mughal Emperor Akbar began the celebration of Bengali New Year and officialised the Bengali calendar to ease the tax collection process.

=== Traditional roots ===
==== Mughal origin theory ====
During Mughal rule, land taxes were collected from Bengali people according to the Islamic Hijri calendar. This calendar was a lunar calendar, and its new year did not coincide with the solar agricultural cycles. According to some sources, the festival was a tradition introduced in Bengal during the rule of Mughal Emperor Akbar to time the tax year to the harvest, and the Bangla year was therewith called Bangabda. Akbar asked the royal astronomer Fathullah Shirazi to create a new calendar by combining the lunar Islamic calendar and solar Hindu calendar already in use, and this was known as Fasholi shan (harvest calendar). According to some historians, this started the Bengali calendar. According to Shamsuzzaman Khan, it could be Nawab Murshid Quli Khan, a Mughal governor, who first used the tradition of Punyaho as "a day for ceremonial land tax collection", and used Akbar's fiscal policy to start the Bangla calendar.

According to Shamsuzzaman Khan, and Nitish Sengupta, the origin of the Bengali calendar is unclear. According to Shamsuzzaman, it is called Bangla shon or shaal, which are Arabic (سن) and Persian (سال) words respectively, suggests that it was introduced by a Muslim king or sultan." In contrast, according to Sengupta, its traditional name is Bangabda. It is also unclear, whether it was adopted by Alauddin Husain Shah or Akbar. The tradition to use the Bengali calendar may have been started by Husain Shah before Akbar. Regardless of who adopted the Bengali calendar and the new year, states Sengupta, it helped collect land taxes after the spring harvest based on traditional Bengali calendar, because the Islamic Hijri calendar created administrative difficulties in setting the collection date. Some say that the current Bengali Calendar begins from the year of Hijrah, i.e., migration of Prophet Muhammad, the last messenger in Islam, from Makkah to Madinah.

The festive celebrations of the Bengali New Year can be traced back to the Bengali Muslim fishmonger community of Mahifarash in Old Dhaka. During the Mughal period, the Mahifarash were known for organising feasts and banquets at their Azimpur grounds to mark the beginning of the cultivation harvest season. This day-long feast served as a precursor to what would later be evolved into the traditional Pohela Boishakh celebration.

==== Vikramaditya origin theory ====
Some historians attribute the Bengali calendar to the 7th-century Gauda king Shashanka. The term Bangabda (Bangla year) is found too in two Shiva temples many centuries older than Akbar era, suggesting that Bengali calendar existed before Akbar's time. Various dynasties whose territories extended into Bengal, prior to the 13th-century, used the Vikrami calendar. Buddhist texts and inscriptions created in the Pala Empire era mention "Vikrama" and the months such as Ashvin, a system found in Sanskrit texts elsewhere in ancient and medieval Indian subcontinent.

In rural Bengali communities of India, the Bengali calendar is credited to "Bikromaditto", like many other parts of India and Nepal. However, unlike these regions where it starts in 57 BCE, the Bengali calendar starts from 593 CE suggesting that the starting reference year was the acension of Shashanka to the throne. Both Sunil Kumar Bandyopadhyay and Rahmatullah Bangali argued that the calendar tracks back to the coronation of King Shashanka. However, Bandyopadhyay's mathematical baseline points to the year 594 CE instead of 593 CE.

=== Contemporary usage ===
In Bangladesh however, the old Bengali calendar was modified in 1966 by a committee headed by Muhammad Shahidullah, making the first five months 31 days long, rest 30 days each, with the month of Falgun adjusted to 31 days in every leap year. This was officially adopted by Bangladesh in 1987. Since then, the national calendar starts with and the new year festival always falls on 14 April in Bangladesh. In 2018–19, the calendar was amended again, with Falgun now lasting 29 days in regular years and to 30 days in leap ones, in an effort to more align with Western use of the Gregorian calendar. However, the date of the celebration, 14 April, was retained.

The Bengali calendar in India remains tied to the Hindu calendar system and is used to set the various Bengali Hindu festivals. For Bengalis of West Bengal and other Indian states, the festival falls either on 14 or 15 April every year. The current Bengali calendar in use in the Indian states is based on the Sanskrit text Surya Siddhanta. It retains the historic Sanskrit names of the months, with the first month as Baishakh.

== Holiday customs ==
=== Visiting family and friends ===
Pohela Boishakh is as much about seeing loved ones as it is about marking the new year. People dress in traditional clothes: women dress in saris or salwar kameez and men dress in kurta, and visit their families and friends to spend quality time together. Pohela Boishakh is also known for uniting friends and family. It is a time of reunion and renewed friendship, of gathering in one another's company, while putting the past behind.

=== New year salutation ===
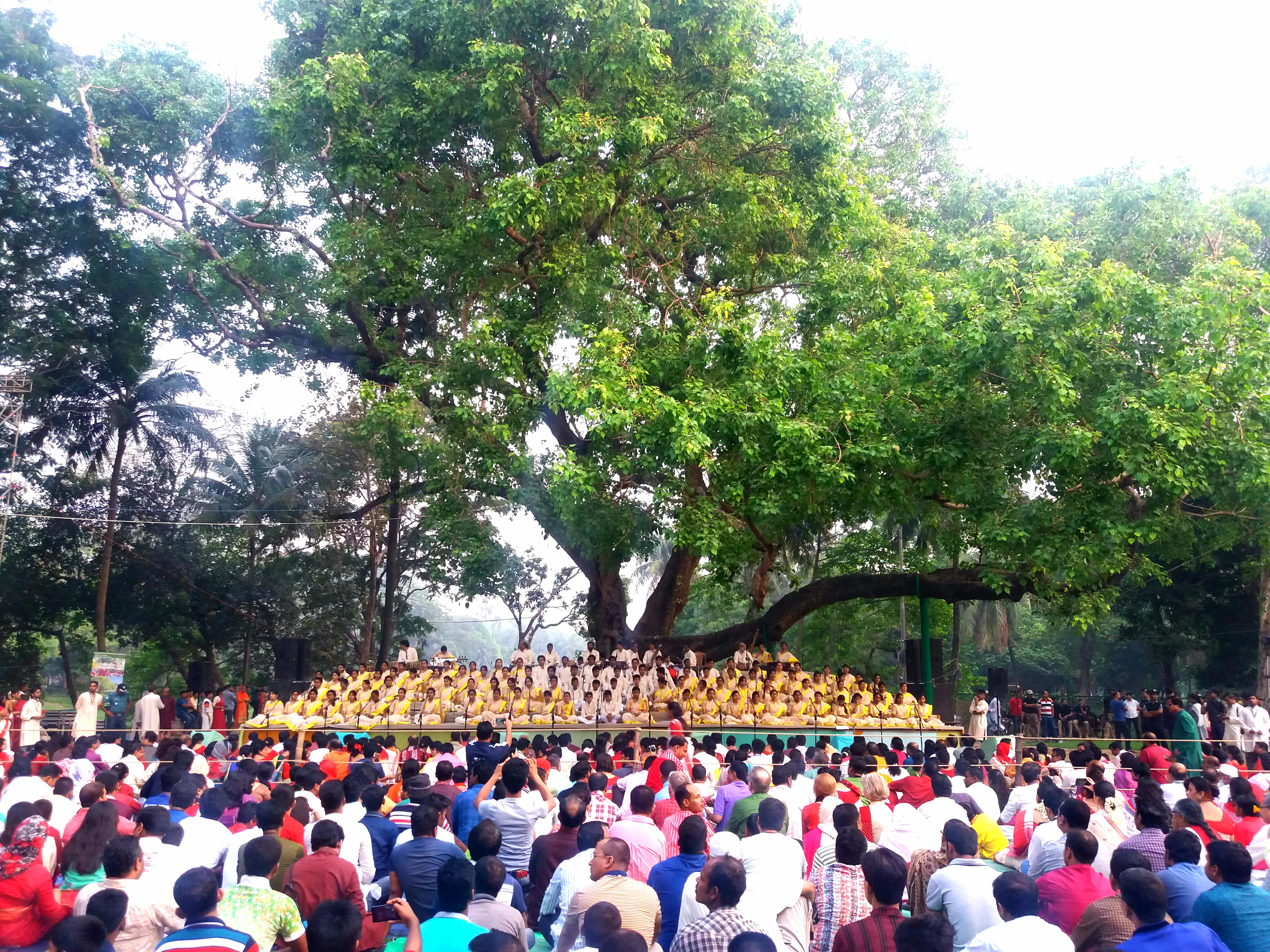
The new year salutation at Ramna Park

The celebration of Bengali new year Pahela Baishakh begins at dawn arranged by the cultural organisation Chhayanaut welcoming the year at Ramna Batamul under the banyan tree in the Ramna Park in Bangladesh.

=== Haal Khata ===
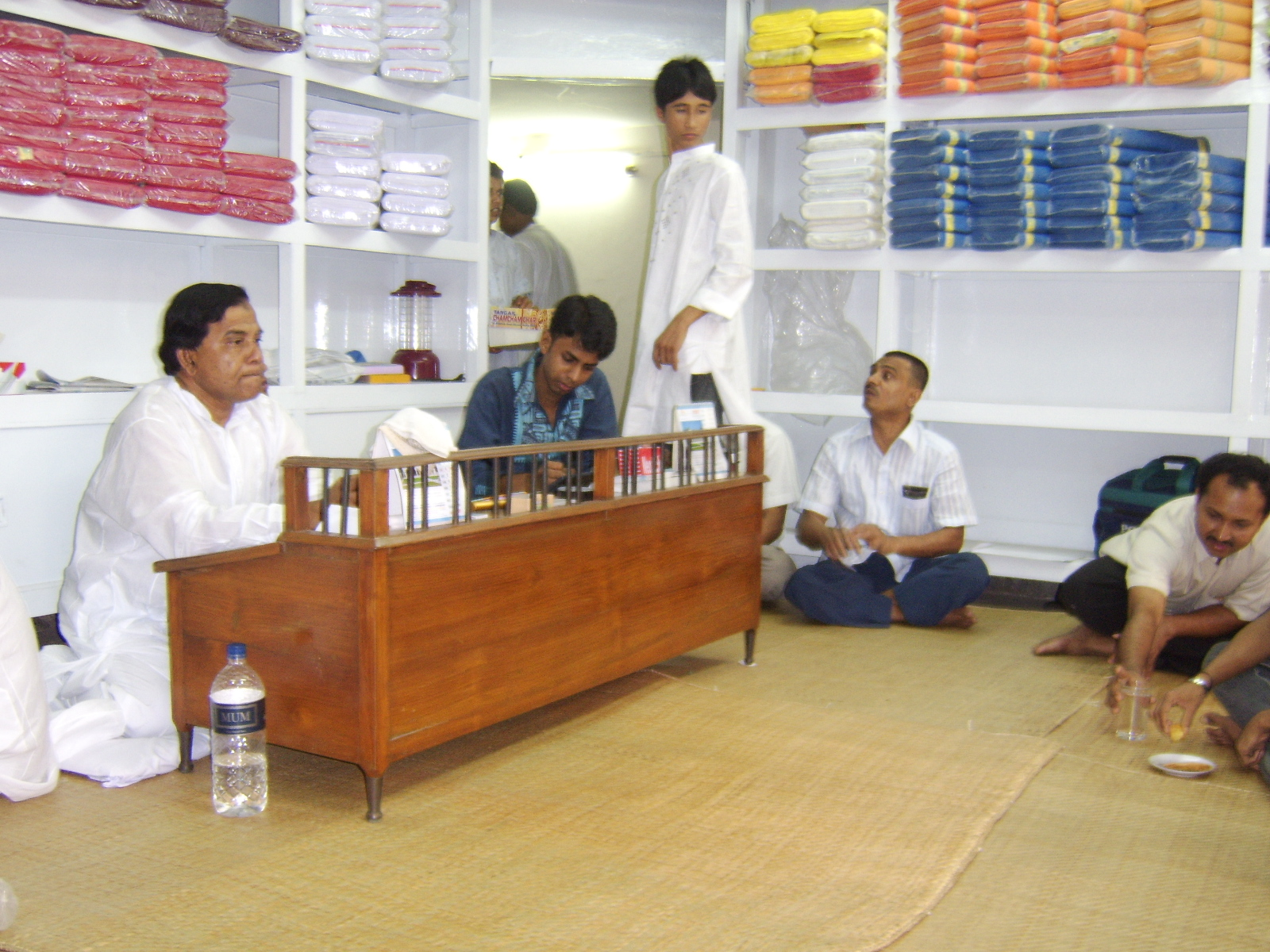
Haal Khata in a shop in Old Dhaka

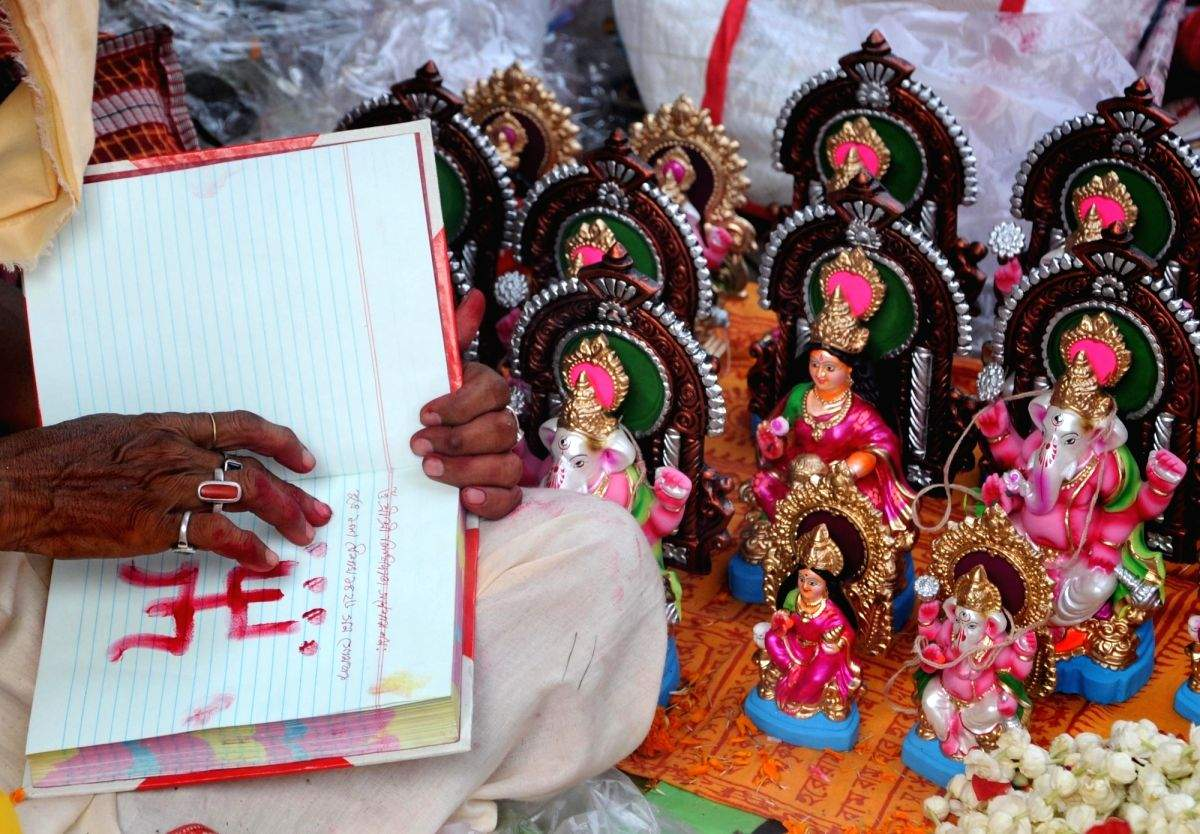
A priest performs a Hindu ritual during Bengali New Year

Haal Khata is a festival celebrated on the occasion of Pohela Boishakh in order to complete all the account reckonings of the last year and open a new ledger. It is observed by the Bengali businessmen, shopkeepers and traders. It signifies that every year starts with a new beginning. It ignores all the due debts of customers and shopkeepers alike, and instead opens a new page for a new year of shopkeeping.

=== Red-white attire ===
On this occasion, males are seen wearing red or white Kurta with traditional designs on them, imprinted or embroidered. Women and young ladies wear red and white saree with blouses and put on flower crowns on their heads. Girls also dress in salwar kameez. They are seen wearing traditional ornaments and accessories along with their dresses. It is thought that it is because the traditional ledgers used in Haal Khata had a red cover with white pages.

=== Baishakhi meal ===
In recent times, claiming it to be traditional, Bengalis eat Panta Bhat or poitabhat, which is a rice-based dish prepared by soaking rice, generally leftovers, in water overnight. It is popularly eaten with Hilsa Fish and other curries. But many argue that it is not an age-old tradition and merely a trend. To stop overfishing and to repopulate the dwindling Hilsa population, around this time, fishing is banned.

=== Mangal shobhajatra ===
Mangal Shobhajatra (Bengali: মঙ্গল শোভাযাত্রা) or Barshabaran Ananda Shobhajatra (Bengali: বর্ষবরণ আনন্দ শোভাযাত্রা) is a mass procession that takes place at dawn on the first day of the Bengali New Year in Bangladesh. The procession is organised by the teachers and students of the Faculty of Fine Arts of the University of Dhaka. The festival is considered an expression of the secular identity of the Bangladeshi people and as a way to promote unity. It was declared an intangible cultural heritage by UNESCO in 2016, categorised on the representative list as a heritage of humanity.

=== Baishakhi Rural Fair ===
It is a fair held by the locals of that area where many different things ranging from books to special dishes are sold. Traditionally, the fair was held under huge Banyan trees and traders from far across the areas would gather with their goods and toys in the fair. Some rides such as Nagordola (wooden Ferris wheel), are set for kids. Different types of traditional foods are sold out in the stalls such as Jilipi, Sandesh, Soan papdi, Batasha (a candy made of sugar or jaggery), Khoi (popped rice), Kadma (a candy made of sugar), and so forth. 'Bioscope', a form of the old movie projector, was also a part of the attraction for the younglings back in the days.

== Locality ==
=== Bangladesh ===
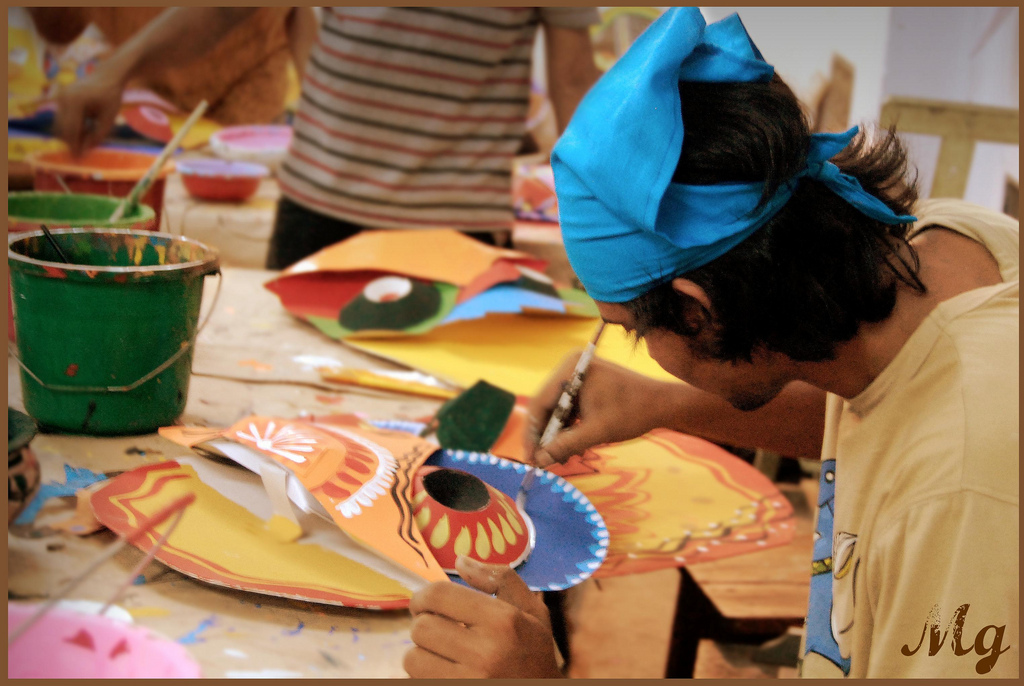
Students of Charukala (Fine Arts) Institute, Dhaka University preparing masks for Pohela Boishakh

The Bengali New Year is observed as a public holiday in Bangladesh. It is celebrated across religious boundaries by its Muslim majority and Hindu minority. According to Willem van Schendel and Henk Schulte Nordholt, the festival became a popular means of expressing cultural pride and heritage among the Bangladeshi as they resisted Pakistani rule in the 1950s and 1960s.

The day is marked with singing, processions, and fairs. Traditionally, businesses start this day with a new ledger, clearing out the old which often involves inviting loyal customers and offering sweetmeats to them. This festival is called Haal Khata. Singers perform traditional songs welcoming the new year. People enjoy classical Jatra plays. People wear festive dress with women desking their hair with flowers. White-red color combinations are particularly popular.

Bangladeshis prepare and enjoy a variety of traditional festive foods on Pohela Boishakh. These include panta bhat (watered rice), ilish bhaji (fried hilsa fish) and many special bhartas (pastes).

==== In Dhaka ====
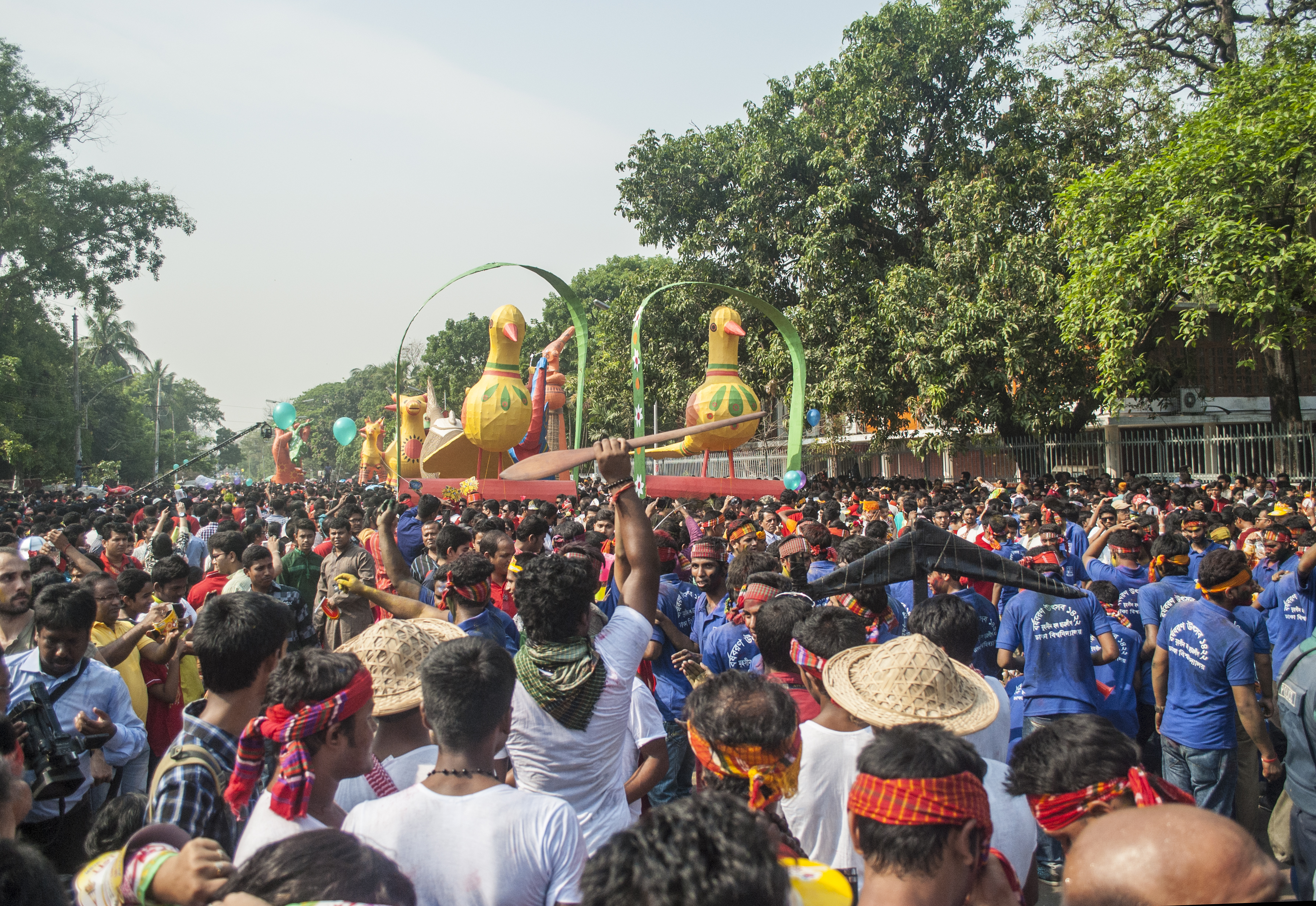
Mangal Shobhajatra at Pohela Boishakh in Bangladesh. UNESCO recognises Mangal Shobhajatra as cultural heritage.

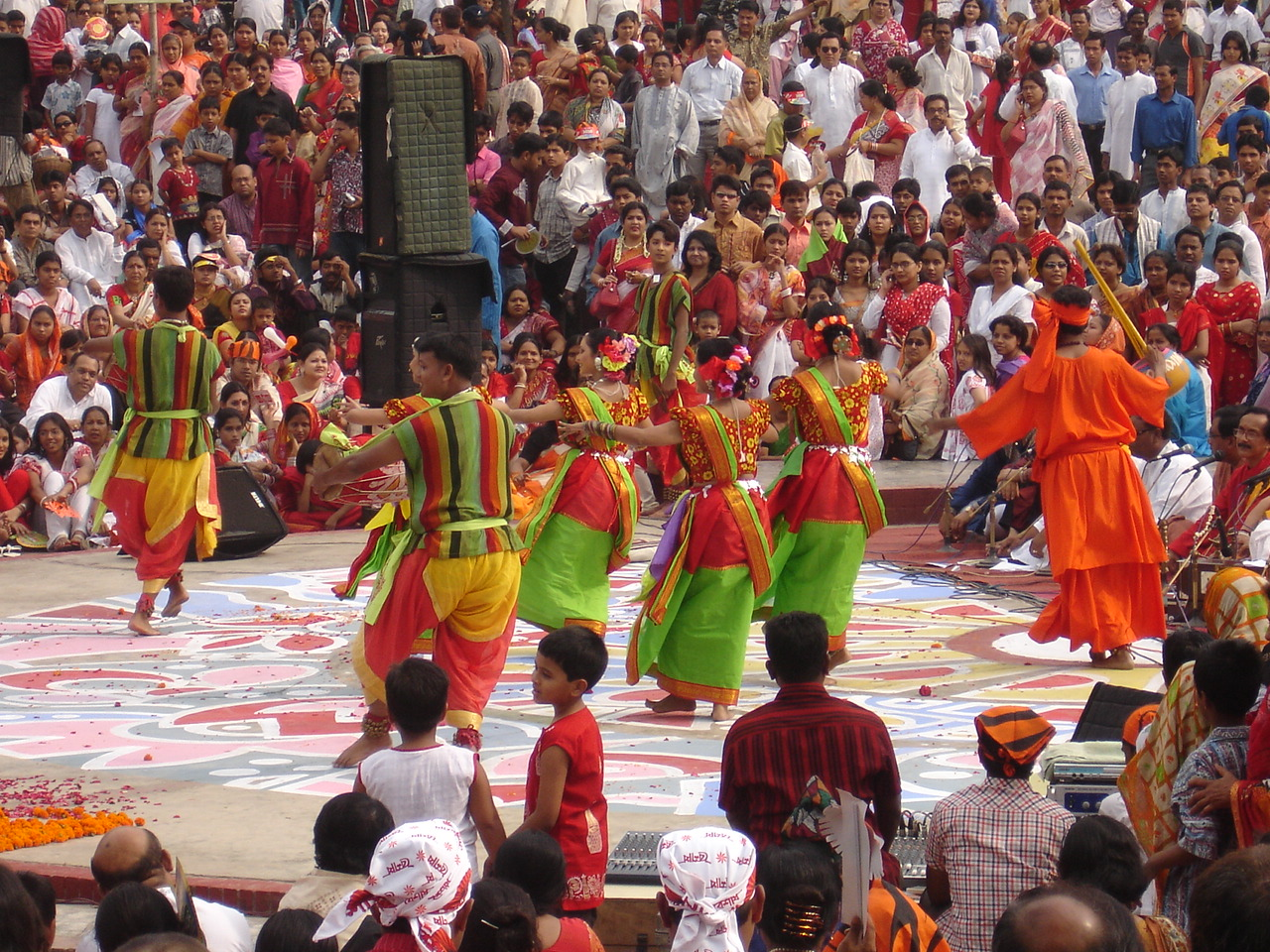
Colorful celebration of Pohela Boishakh in Dhaka

The celebrations start in Dhaka at dawn with a rendition of Rabindranath Tagore's song "Esho he Boishakh" by Chhayanaut under the banyan tree at Ramna (the Ramna Batamul). An integral part of the festivities is the Mangal Shobhajatra, a traditional colourful procession organised by the students of the Faculty of Fine Arts, University of Dhaka (Charukala). According to the history, the rudimentary step of Mangal Shobhjatra was started in Jessore by Charupith, a community organisation, in 1985. Later in 1989 the Faculty of Fine Arts, University of Dhaka arranged this Mangal Shobhajatra with different motifs and themes. Now, the Mangal Shobhajatra is celebrated by different organisation in all over the country.

The Dhaka University Mangal Shobhajatra tradition started in 1989 when students used the procession to overcome their frustration with the military rule. They organised the festival to create masks and floats with at least three theme, one highlighting evil, another courage, and a third about peace. It also highlighted the pride of Bangladeshi people for their folk heritage irrespective of religion, creed, caste, gender or age.

In recent years, the procession has a different theme relevant to the country's culture and politics every year. Different cultural organisations and bands also perform on this occasion and fairs celebrating Bengali culture are organised throughout the country. Other traditional events held to celebrate Pohela Boishakh include bull racing in Munshiganj, Boli Khela (wrestling) in Chittagong, Nouka Baich (boat racing), cockfights, pigeon racing.

==== In Chittagong ====
Pohela Boishakh celebrations in Chittagong involves similar traditions of that in Dhaka. The students of the fine arts institute of Chittagong University brings the Mangal Shobhajatra procession in the city, followed by daylong cultural activities.

At DC hill & CRB, a range of cultural programmes are held by different socio-cultural and educational organisations of the city. The Shammilito Pohela Boishakh Udjapon Parishad holds a two-day function at the hill premises to observe the festival, starting with Rabindra Sangeet recitations in the morning. In the late afternoon, through evening, Chaitra Sangkranti programme is held to bid farewell to the previous year.

At the Chittagong Shilpakala Academy, different folk cultures, music, dances, puppet shows are displayed.

=== India ===
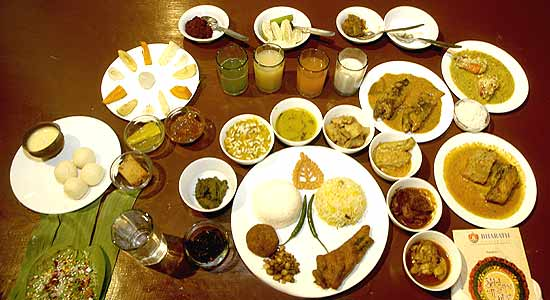
Pohela Boishakh Festive Meal

Bengalis of India have historically celebrated Pohela Boishakh, and it is an official regional holiday in its states of West Bengal and Tripura. The day is also called Nabo Barsho.

==== West Bengal ====
Pohela Boisakh has been the traditional New Year festival in the state, with the new year referred to as the Noboborsho. The festival falls on 14 or 15 April, as West Bengal follows its traditional Bengali calendar, which adjusts for solar cycle differently than the one used in Bangladesh where the festival falls on 14 April.

Notable events of West Bengal include the early morning cultural processions called Prabhat Pheri. These processions see dance troupes and children dressed up with floats, displaying their performance arts to songs of Rabindranath Tagore.

==== Tripura and Northeast India ====
Pohela Boishakh is a state holiday in Tripura. People wear new clothes and start the day by praying at the temples for a prosperous year. The day marks the traditional accounting new year for merchants. Festive foods such as confectionery and sweets are purchased and distributed as gifts to friends and family members.

The festival is also observed by the Bengali communities in other eastern states such as Assam.

=== Celebration in other countries ===
Bangladesh Heritage and Ethnic Society of Alberta in Canada celebrates its Heritage Festival (Bengali New Year) in a colourful manner along with other organisations. Bengali people in Calgary celebrate the day with traditional food, dress, and with Bengali culture. The Bangabandhu Council of Australia also hosts a Pohela Boishakh event at the Sydney Olympic Park.

== Gallery ==
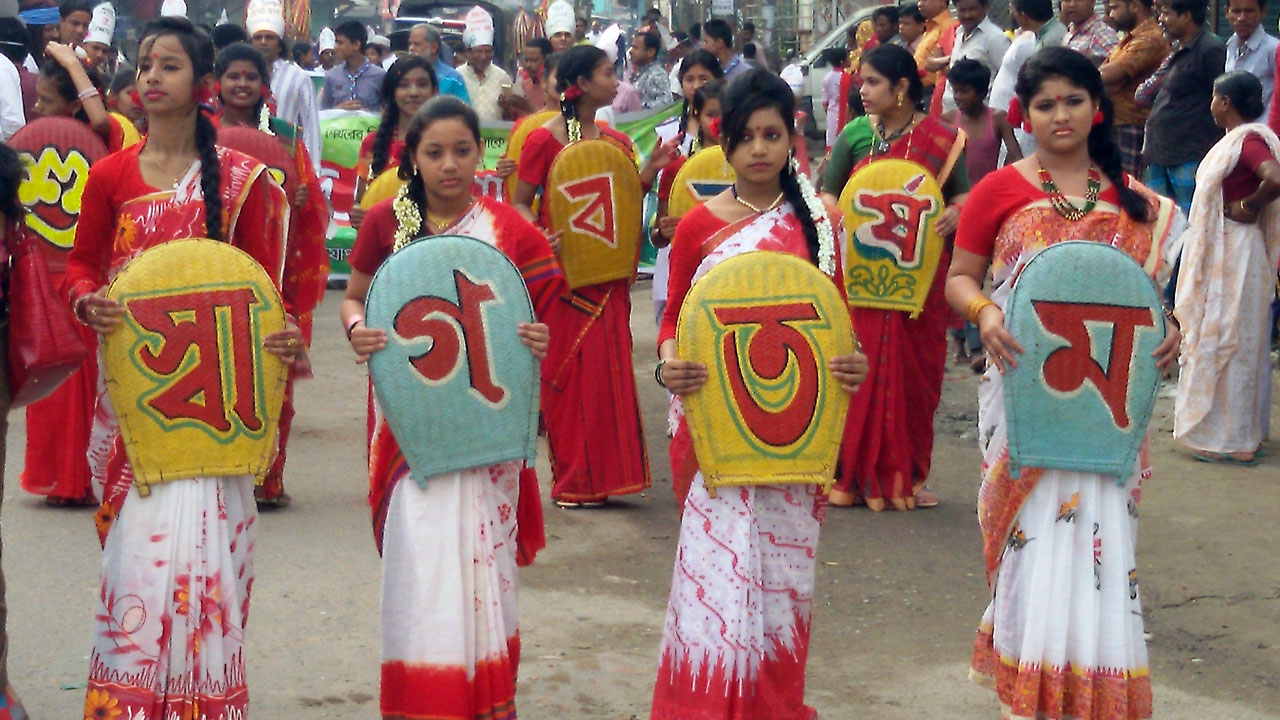
Children in Bangladesh carrying placards in Pohela Boishakh's rally

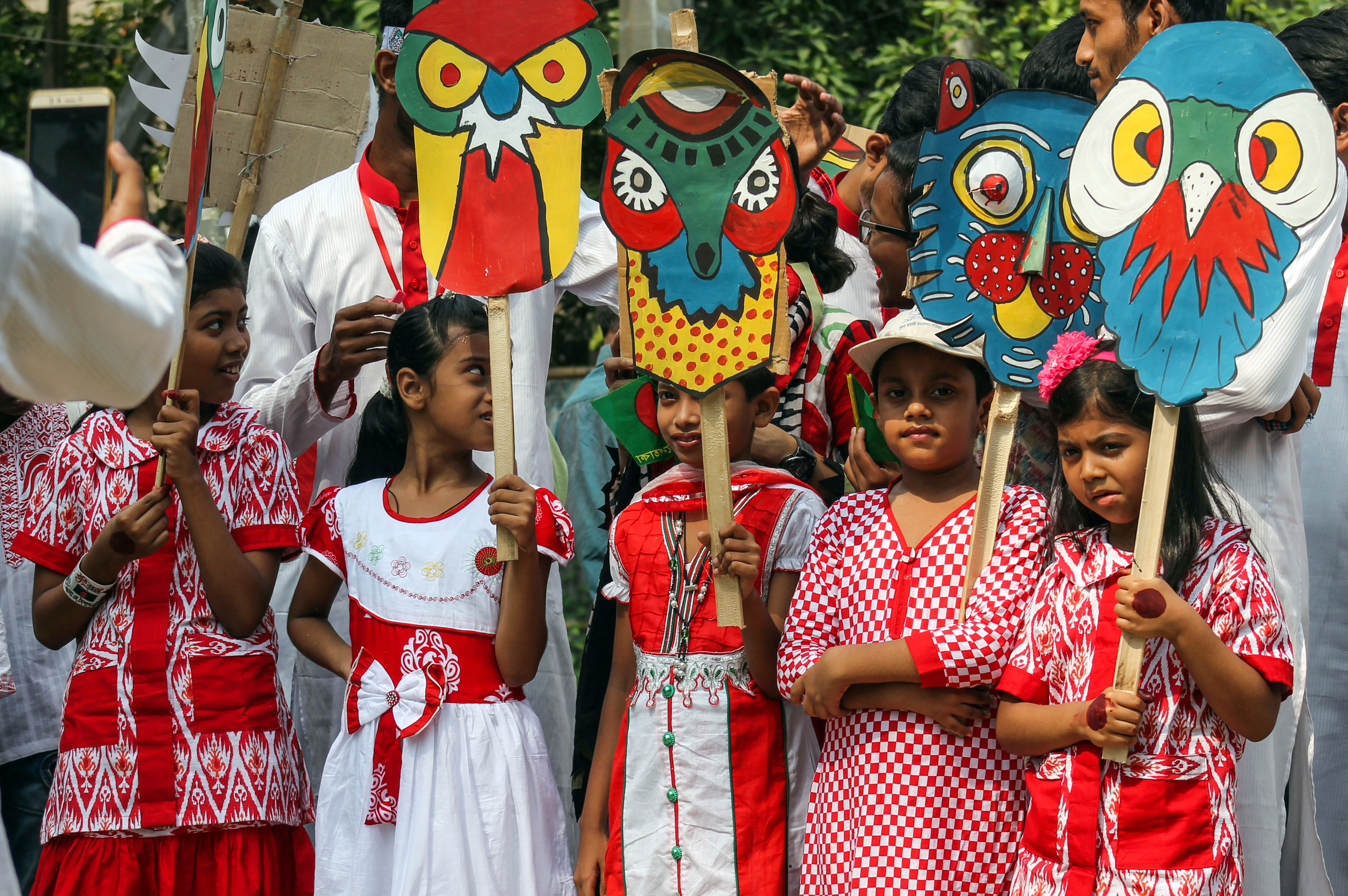
Children in Bangladesh carrying colourful placards in Pohela Boishakh's rally

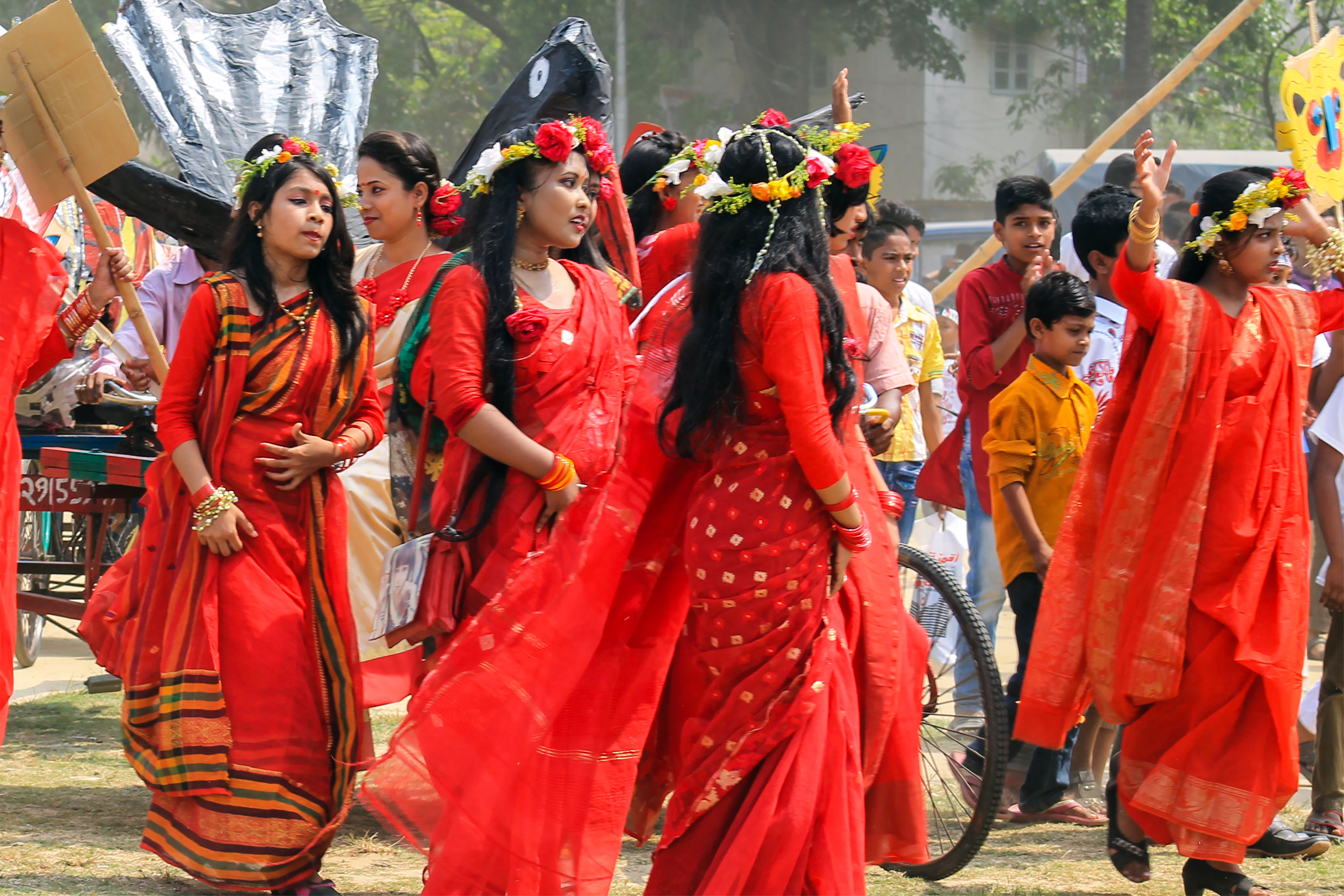
Girls in Bangladesh wearing traditional saris and flower crowns at Pohela Boishakh celebration in Chittagong

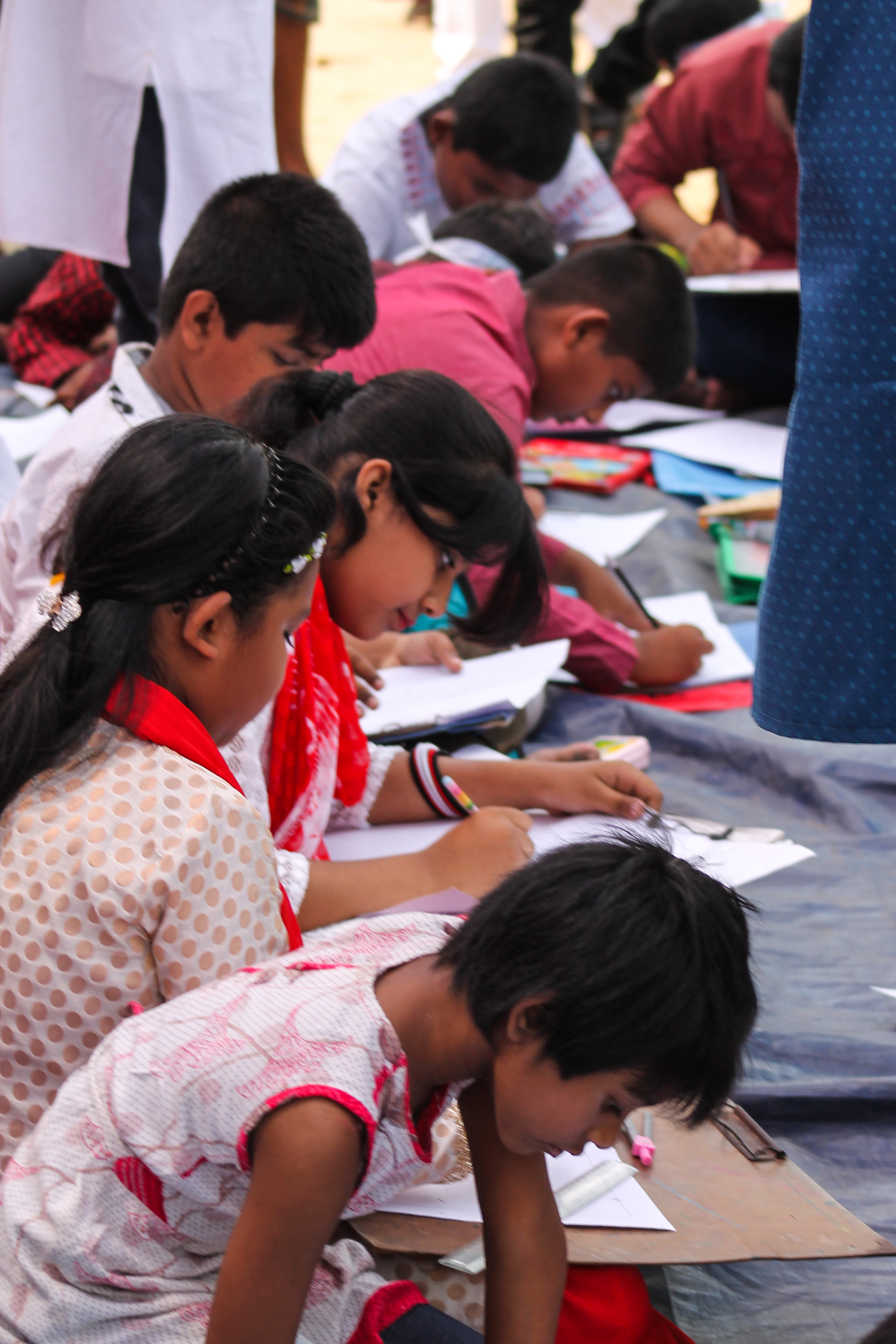
Art competition at Pohela Boishakh celebration in Chittagong

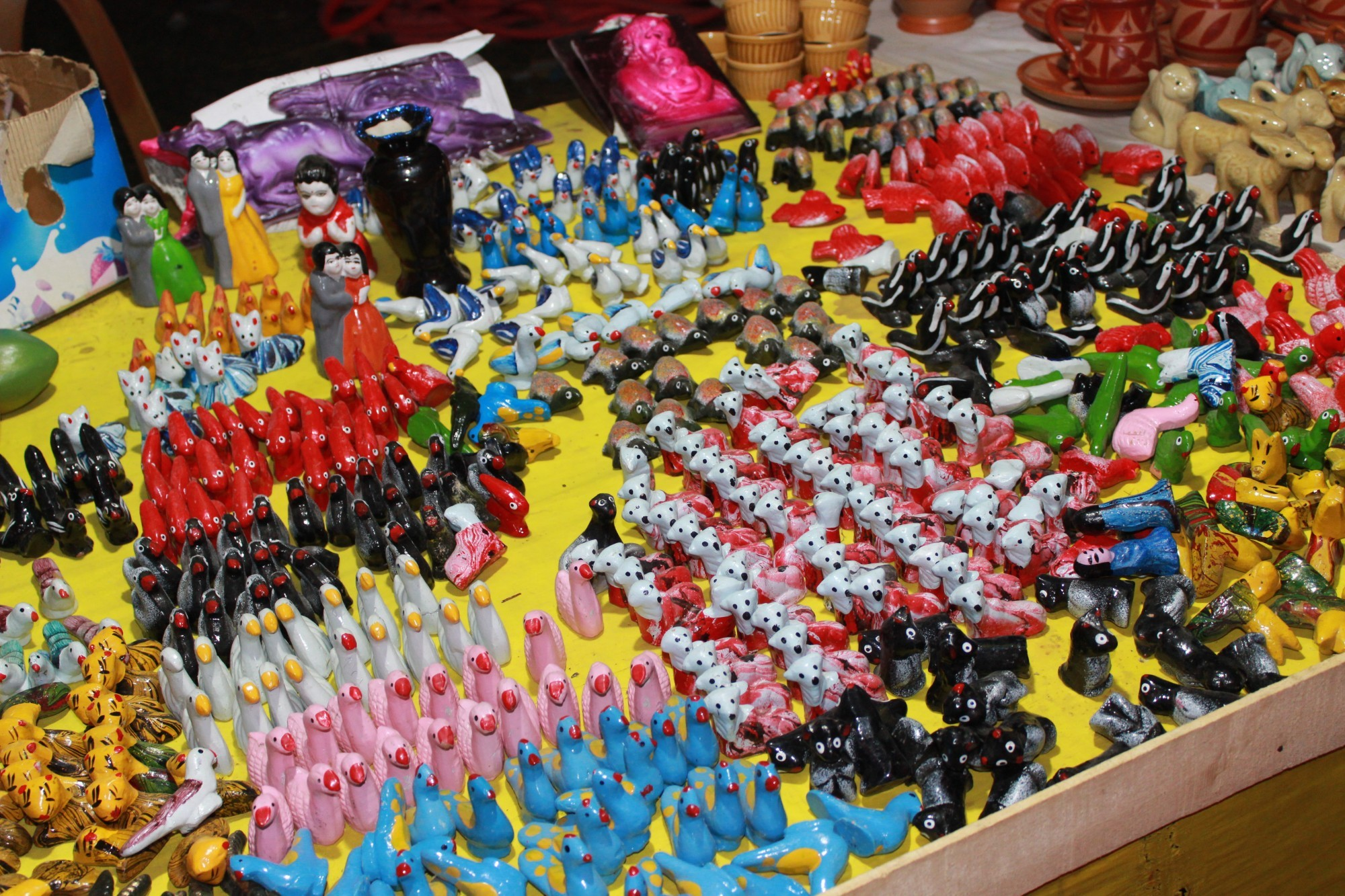
Colorful show pieces in a Boishakhi fair stall

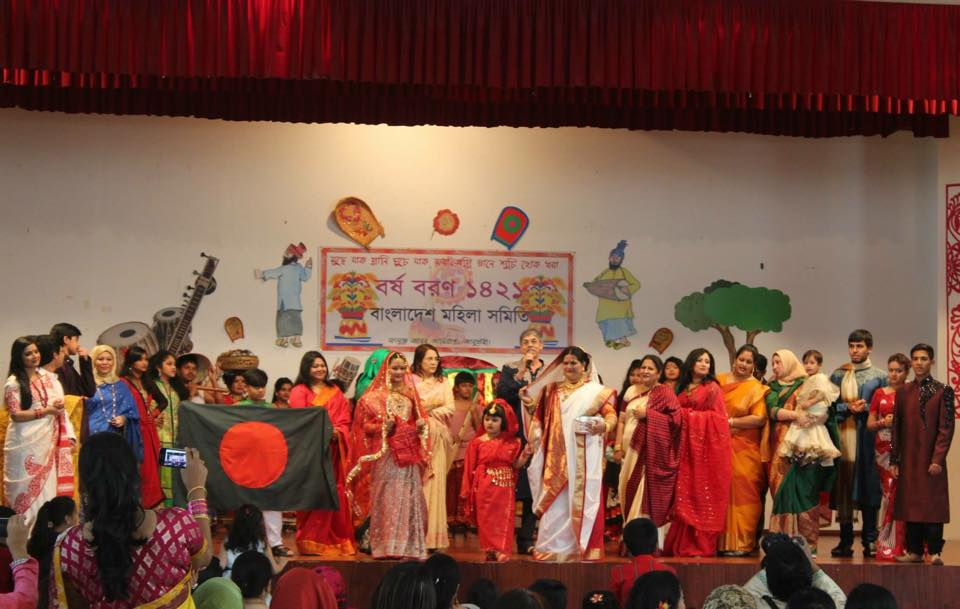
Pohela Boishakh Celebration by the Women Association, Abudhabi, UAE

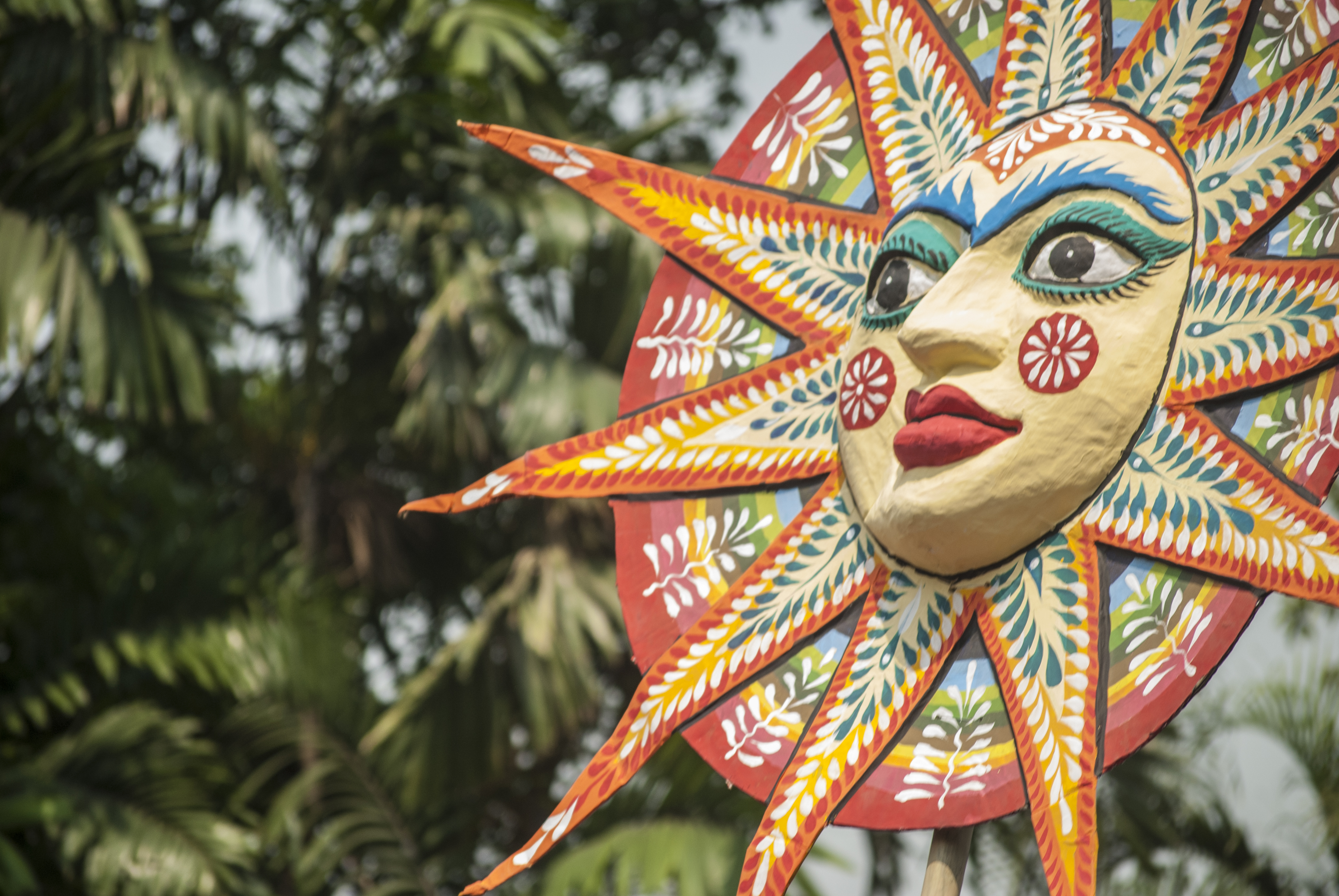
A motif of sun at Mangal Shobhajatra procession in Pohela Boishakh celebration at Dhaka

== See also ==
- Bengali Renaissance
- List of festivals in Bangladesh
- List of festivals in West Bengal
- Pohela Falgun
- Haal Khata
- Bangal
