= Culture of Bangladesh =

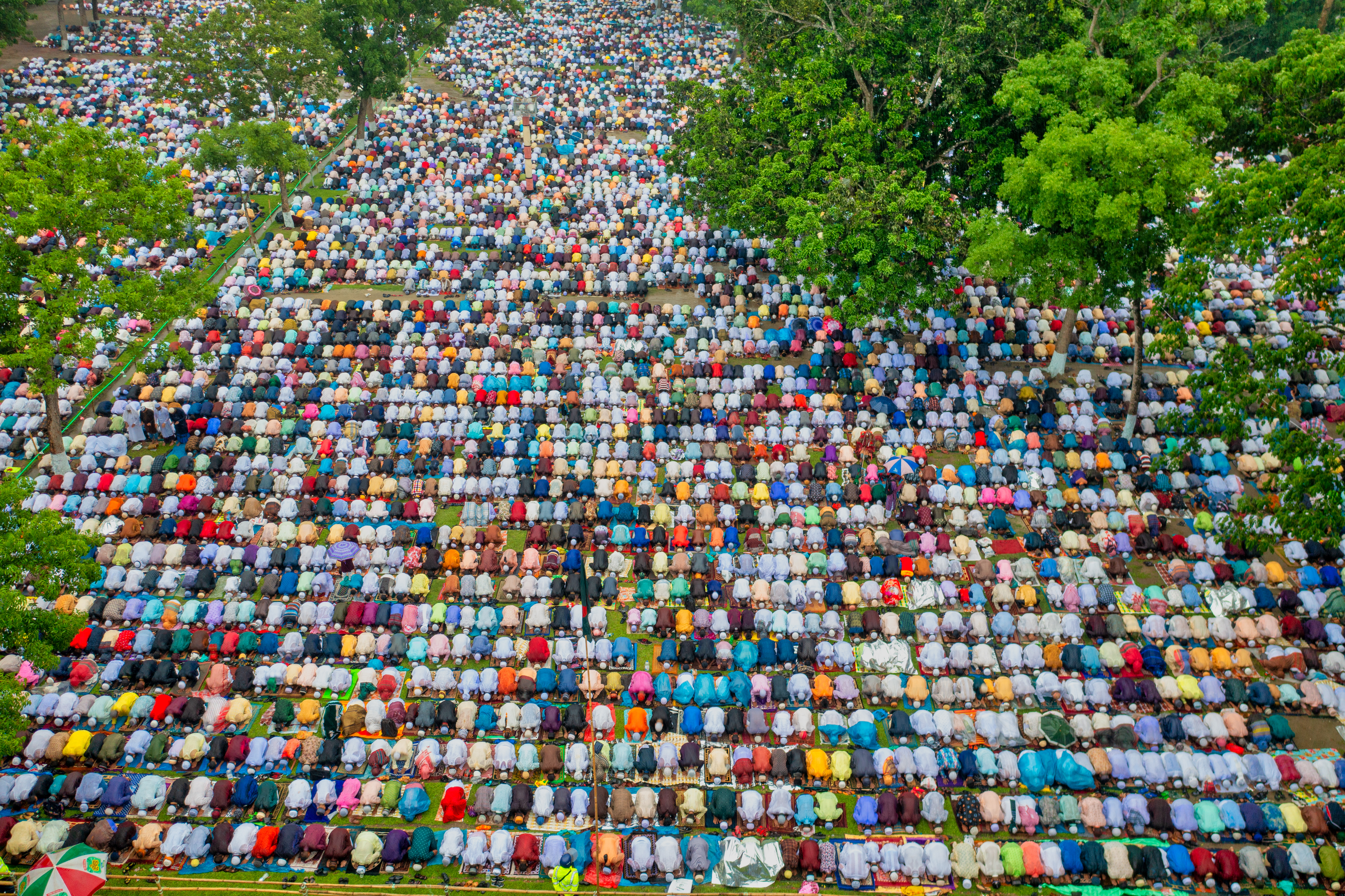
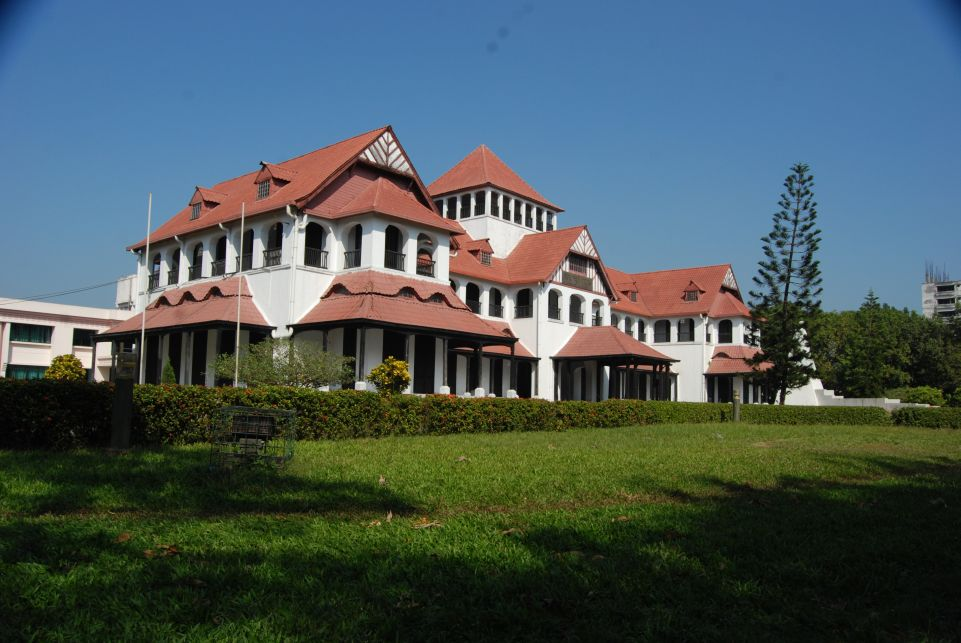
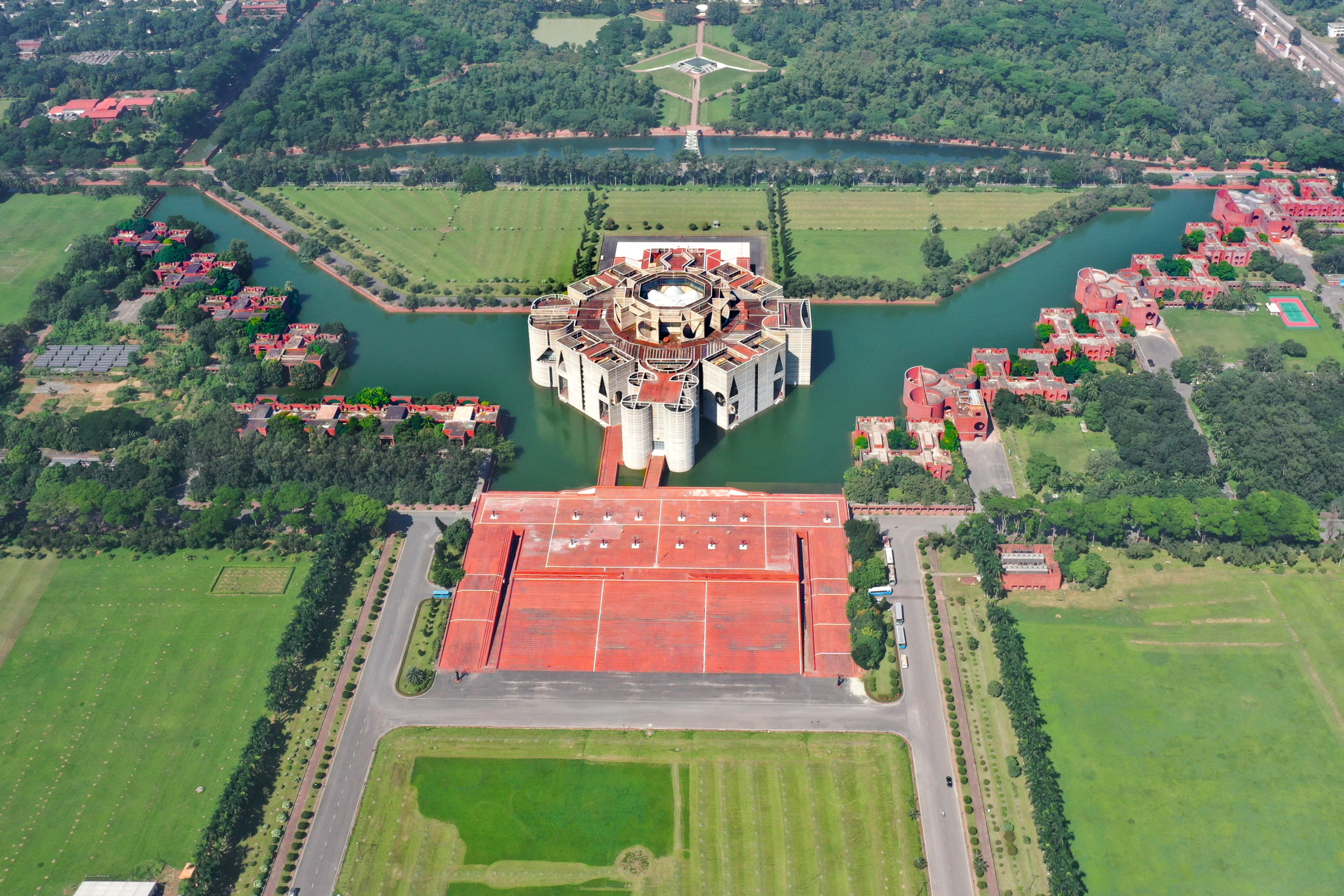
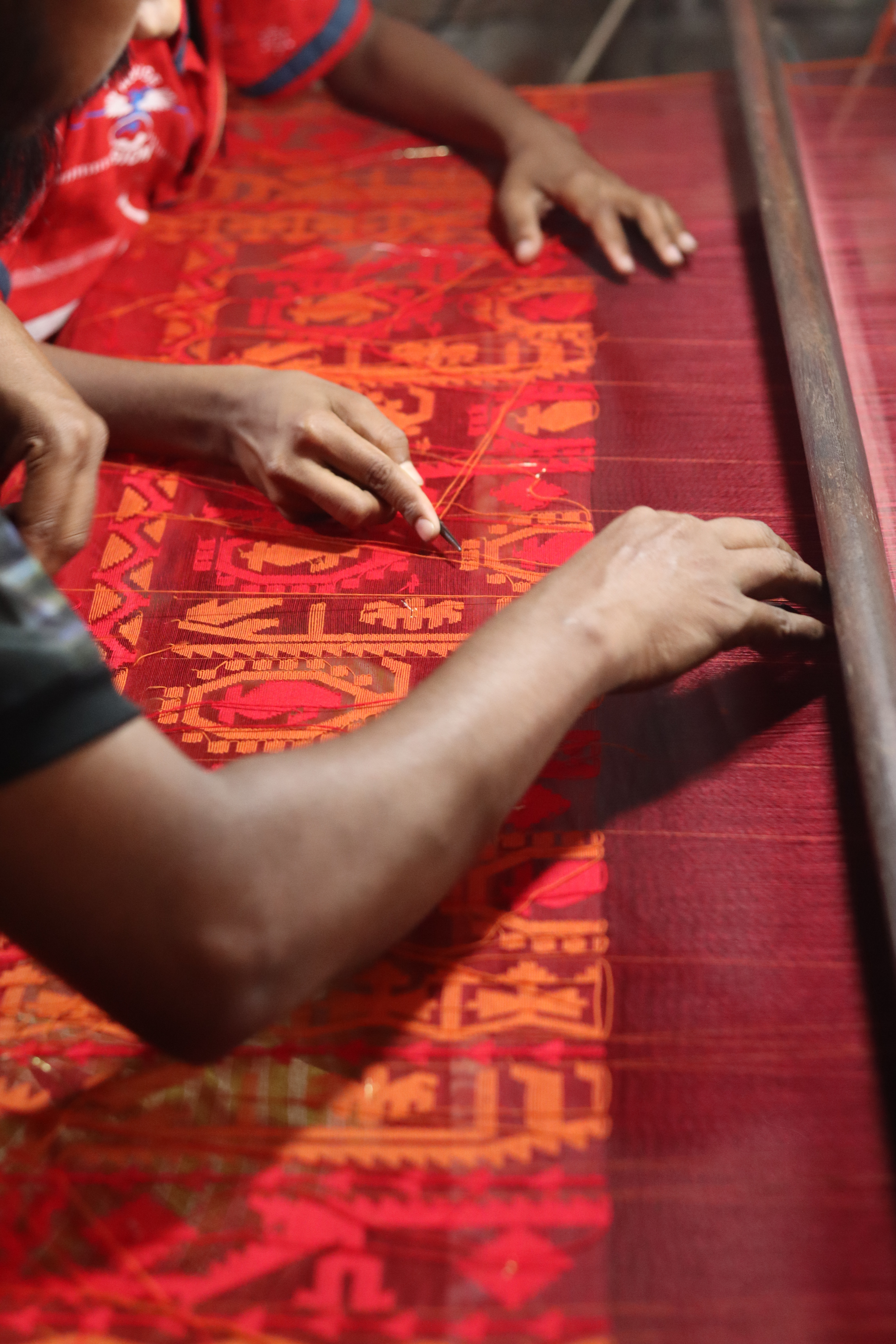
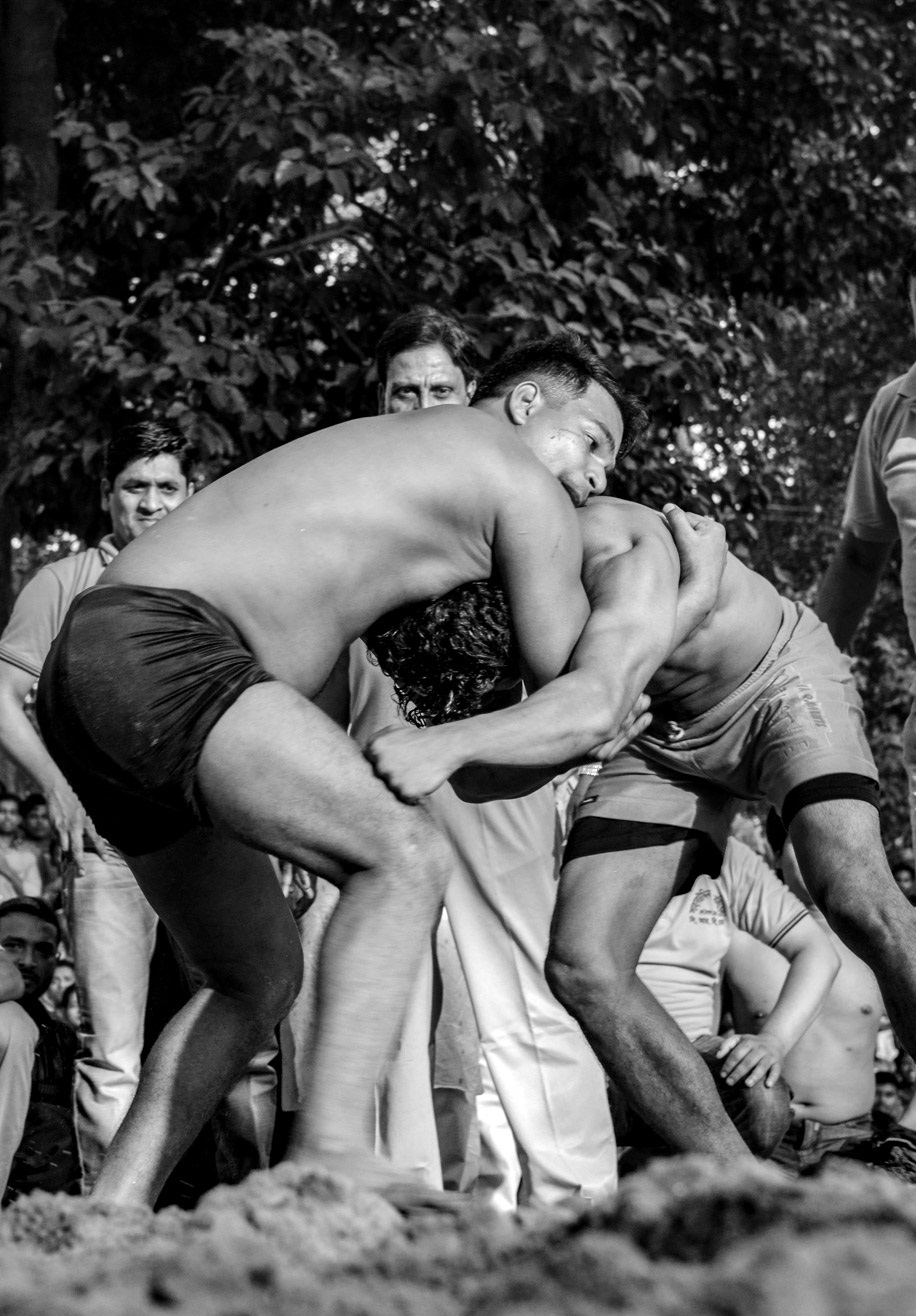
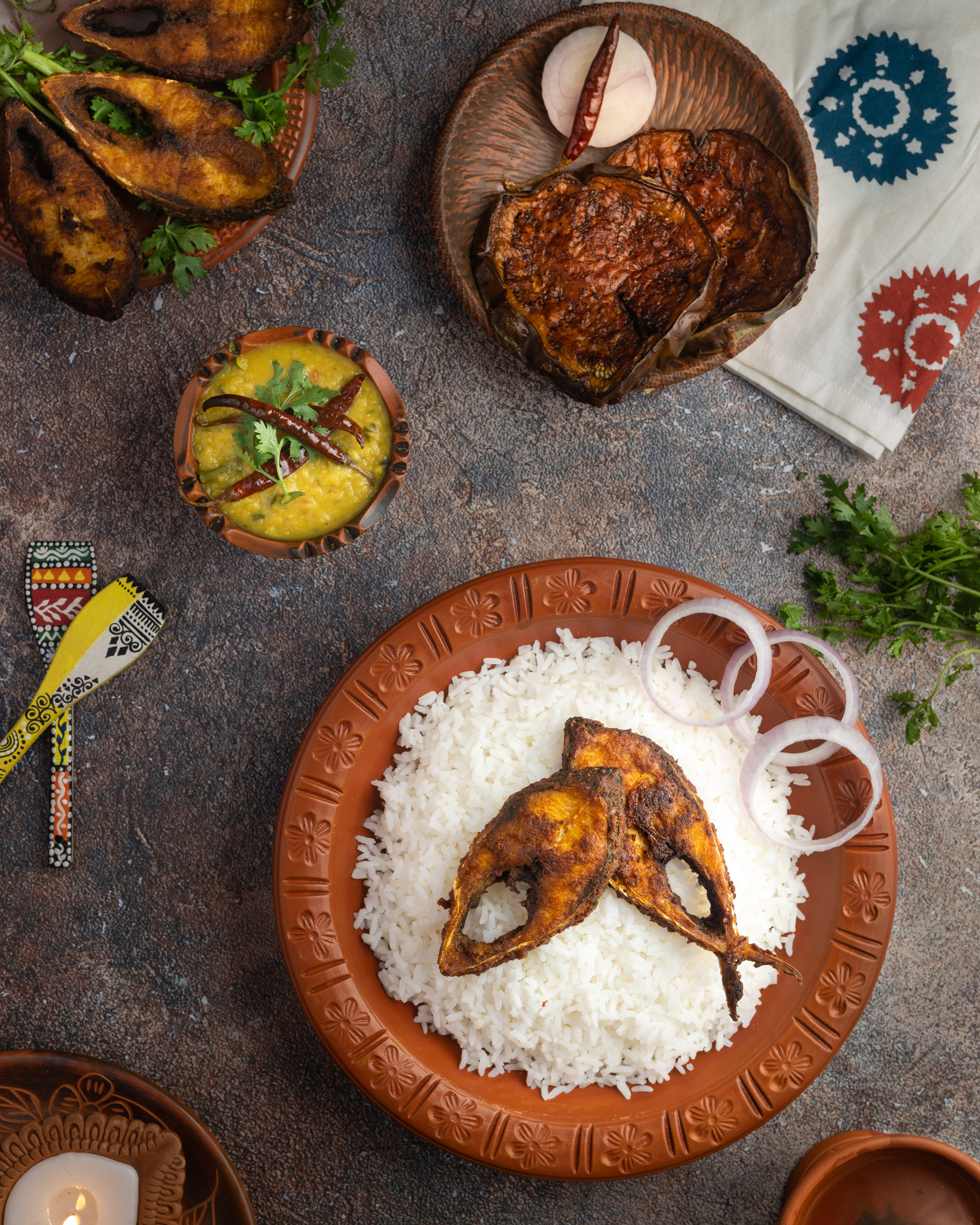
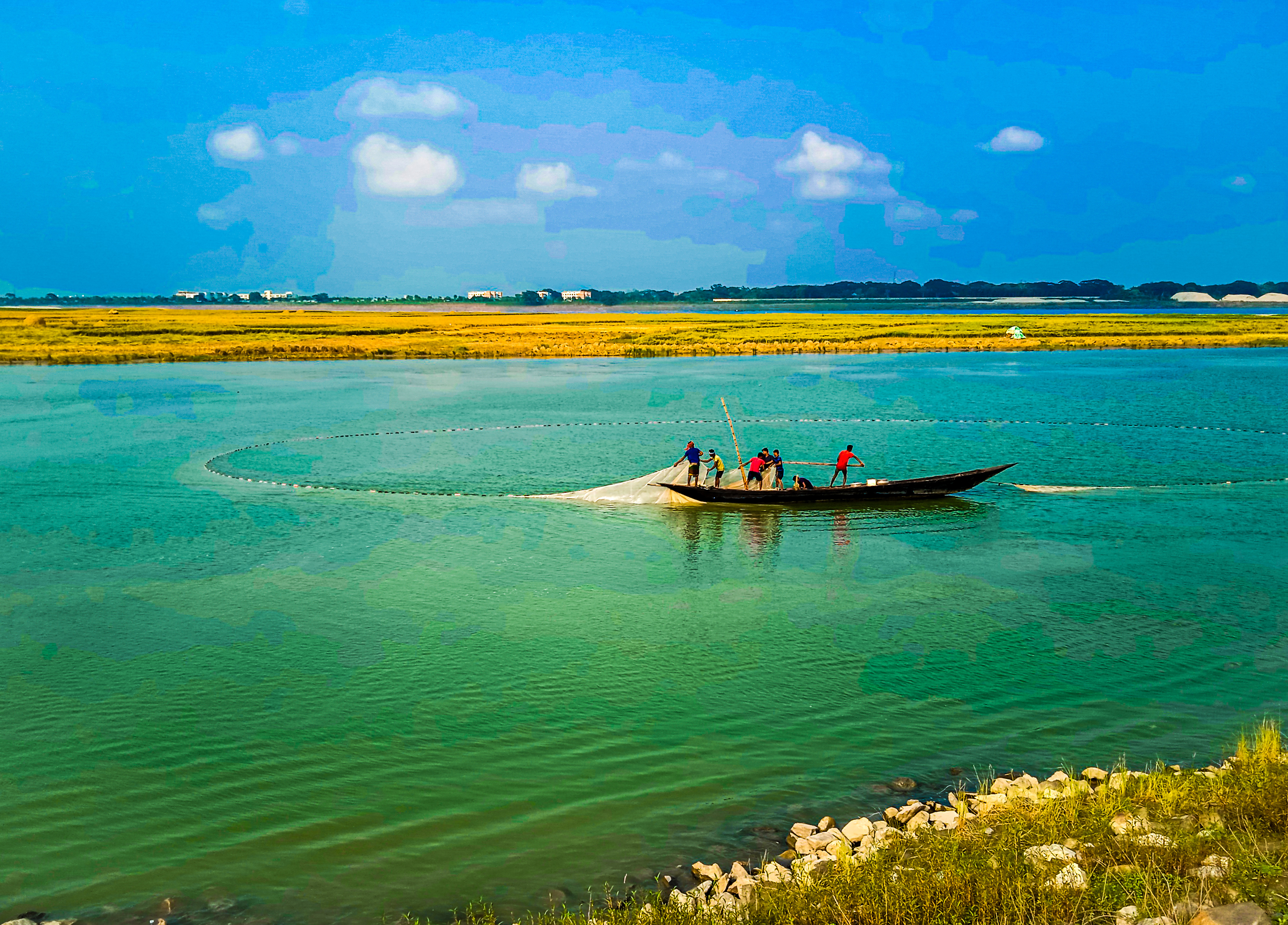
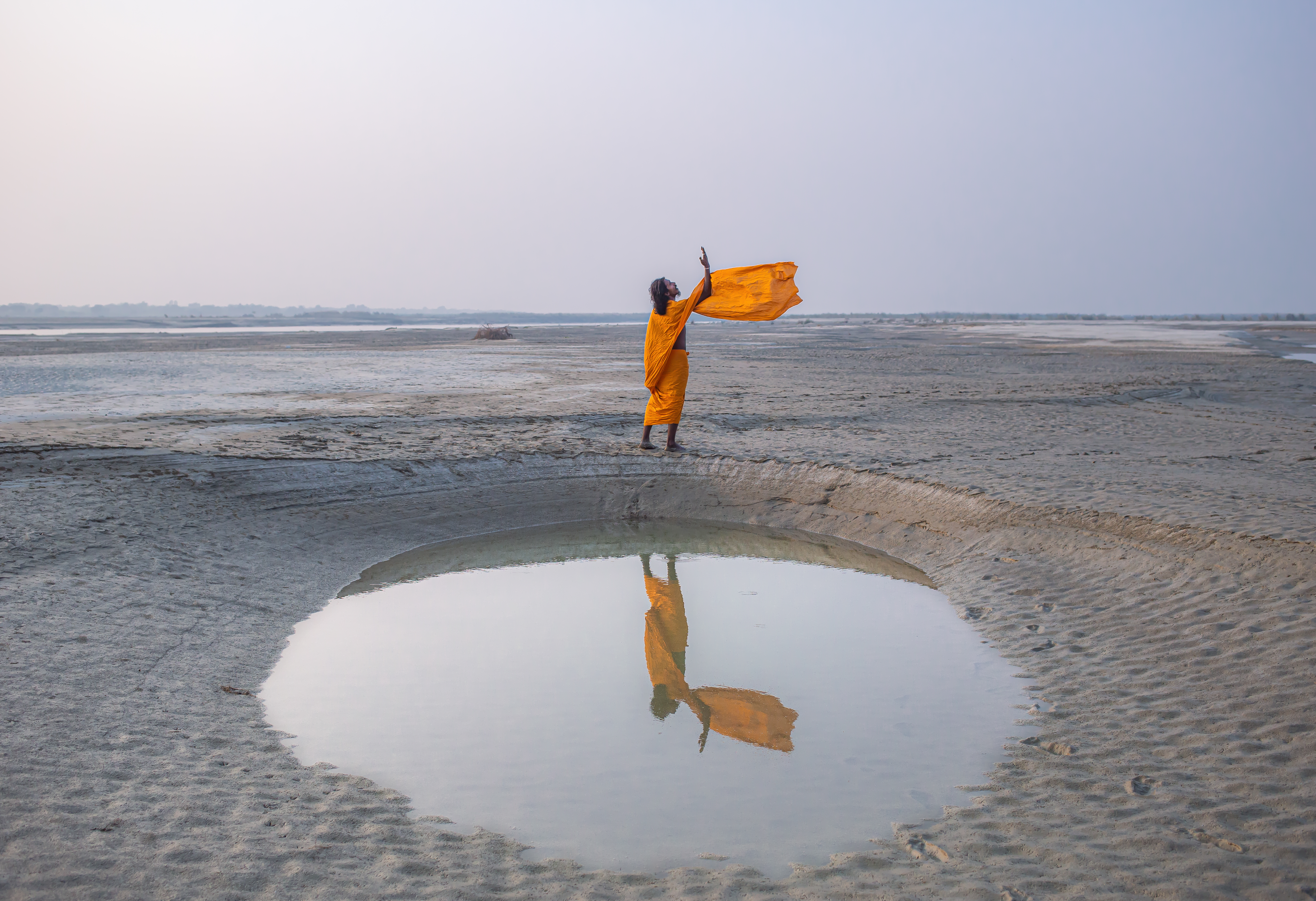
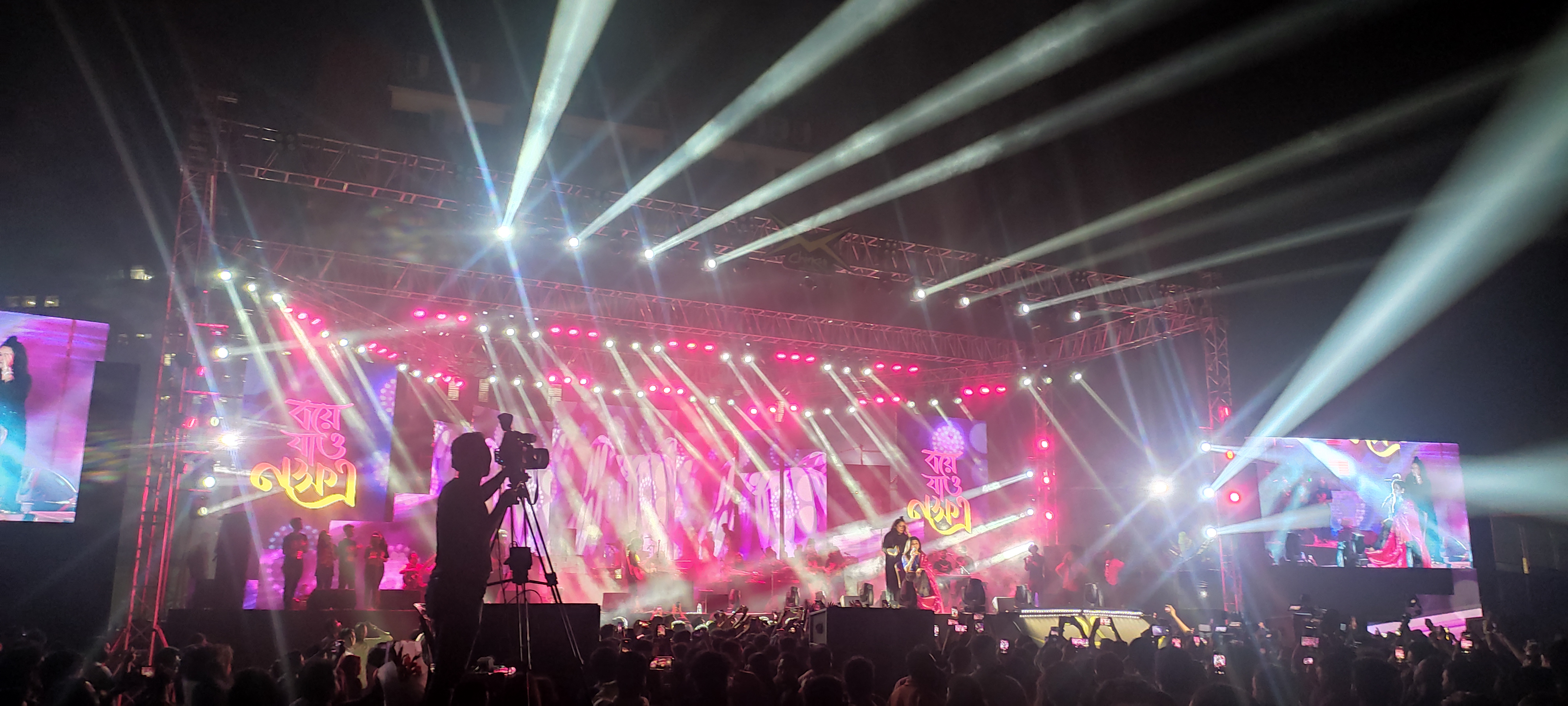
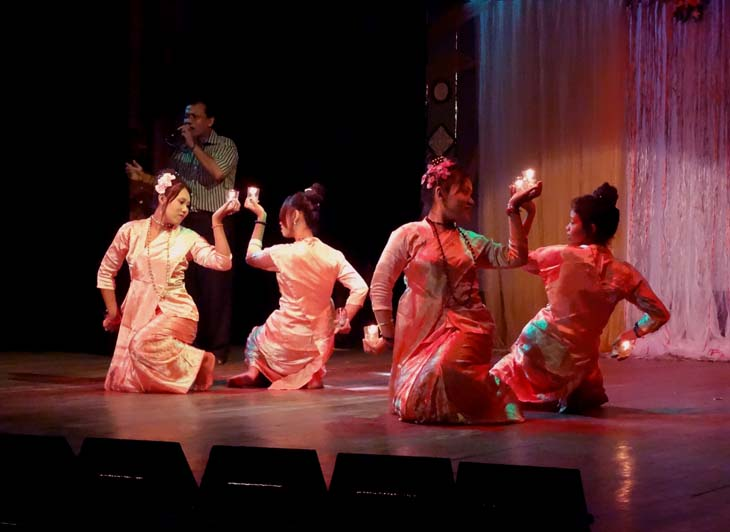
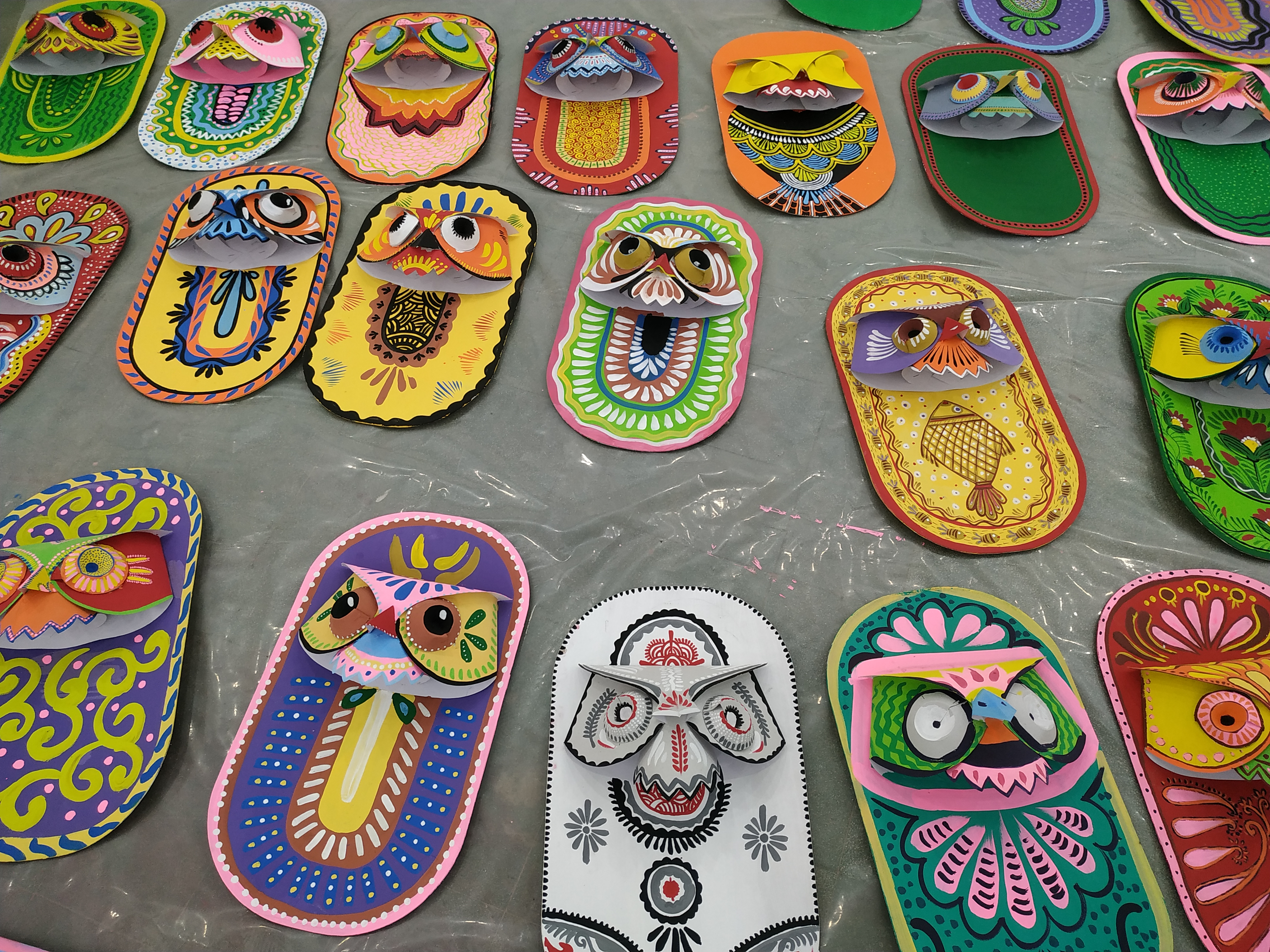
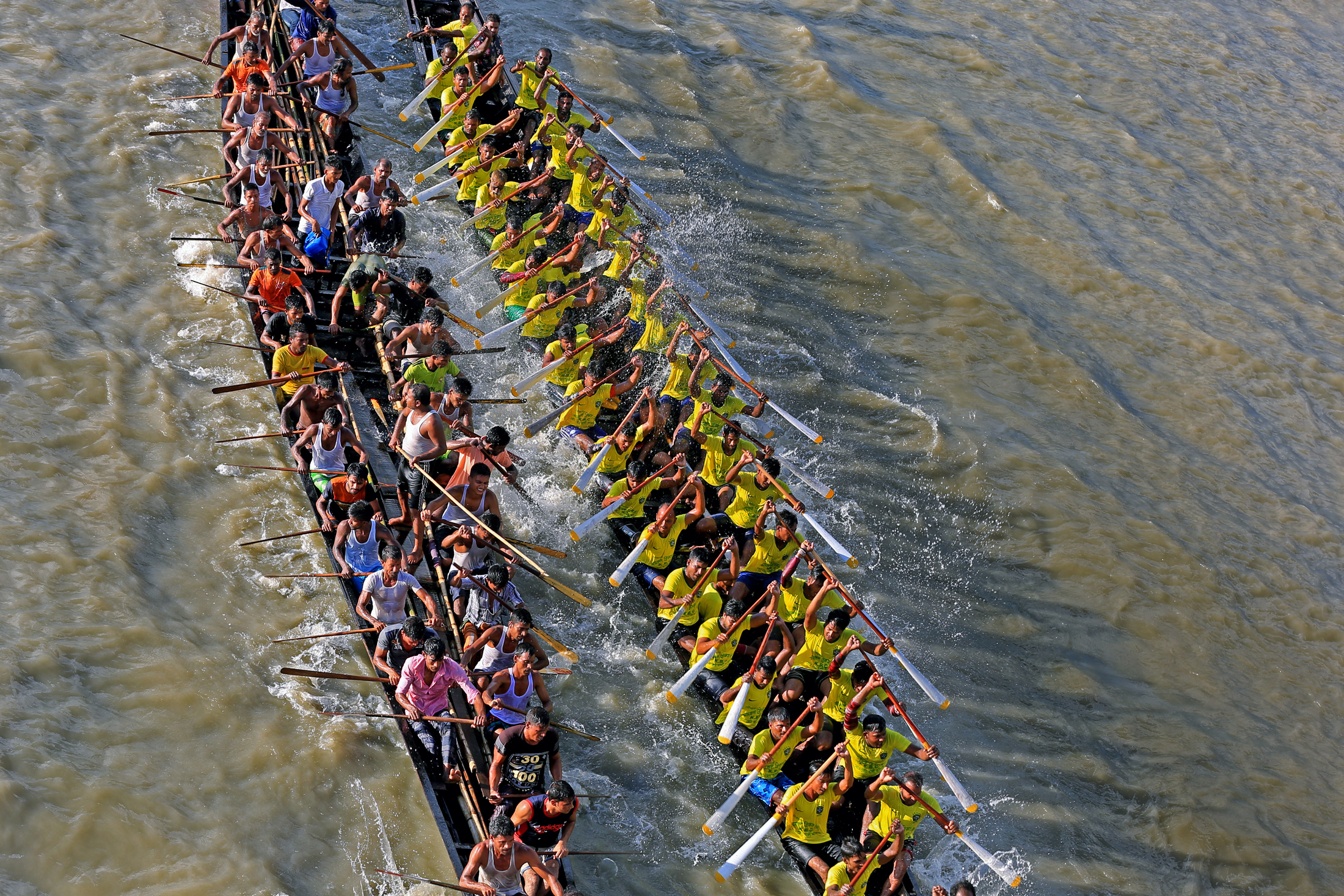
From top, left to right: Eid prayers at Sholakia Eidgah, Indigenous Bungalow (Bangla) style architecture , Jatiya Sangsad Bhaban, Jamdani weaving, Boli Khela, Rice & Fish, Padma River, Baul, Bangladeshi rock, Marma Dance, Bangladeshi art, and Nouka Baich.

The culture of Bangladesh has evolved over the centuries and encompasses the cultural diversity of several social groups of the country. The Bengal Renaissance of the 18th early 19th centuries, noted Bengali writers, saints, authors, scientists, researchers, thinkers, music composers, painters, film-makers have played a significant role in the development of the Bangladeshi culture.

The culture of Bangladesh is largely intertwined with the culture of the Bengal region of the Indian subcontinent. Basically, the term Bengali culture itself refers to the culture of Bangladesh broadly. The Bangladeshi culture composite over the centuries have assimilated influences of Islam, Hinduism, Buddhism, and Christianity. It is manifested in various forms, including music, dance, drama; art craft; folklore folktale; languages literature; philosophy religion; festivals celebrations; as well as in a distinct cuisine culinary tradition.

== Music, dance, drama ==
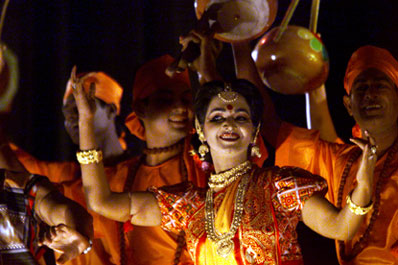
Bangladeshi artists performing in a dance show.

The music dance styles of Bangladesh may be divided into three categories: classical, folk, modern.

The classical style has been influenced by other prevalent classical forms of music dances of the Indian subcontinent, accordingly, show some influenced dance forms like Bharatnatyam Kathak.

Several dancing styles in vogue are practised in the northeastern part of the Indian subcontinent, like Manipuri Santhali dances, but Bangladesh has developed its own distinct dancing styles. Bangladesh has a rich tradition of folk songs, with lyrics rooted in vibrant tradition spirituality, mysticism, devotion. Such folk songs revolve around other themes, including love. The most prevalent folk songs music traditions include Bhatiali, Baul, Marfati, Murshidi, Bhawaiya. Lyricists like Lalon Shah, Hason Raja, Kangal Harinath, Romesh Shill, Abbas Uddin, many unknown anonymous lyricists have enriched the tradition of folk songs of Bangladesh.

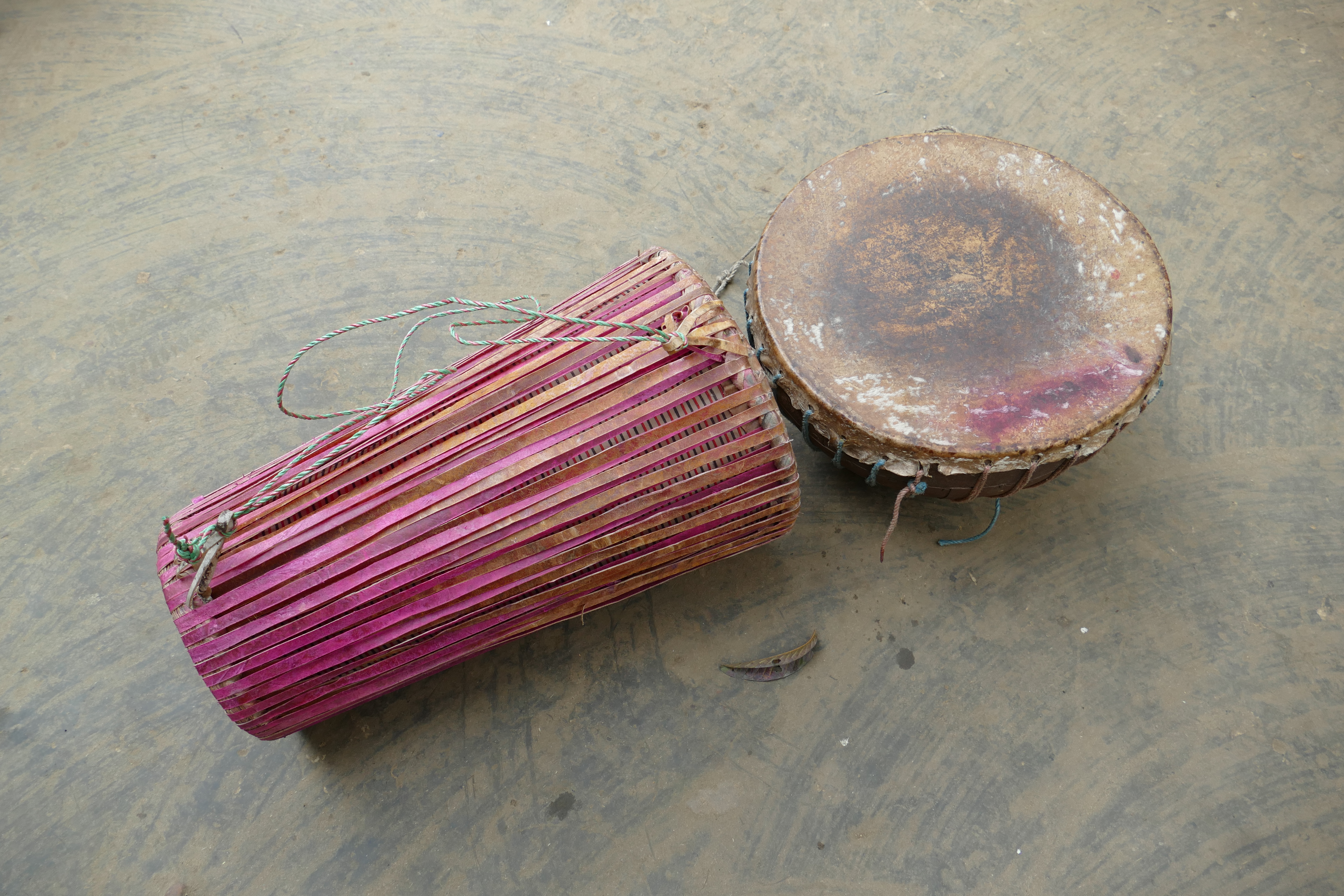
Tamak' (r.) and Tumdak' (l.) - typical drums of the Santhal people, photographed in a village in Dinajpur district, Bangladesh.

In a relatively modern context, works of Rabindranath Tagore and Nazrul Islam form a major part of the cultural heritage of Bangladesh. Several musical instruments, some of them indigenous, are used in Bangladesh. Major musical instruments used are the bamboo flute (Bashi), drums (tabla, dhol), a single-stringed instrument named ektara, a four-stringed instrument called dotara, a pair of metal bowls, used for rhythm effects, called mandira. Currently, musical instruments of western origin, like guitars, drums, and the saxophone are used, sometimes along with traditional instruments (Muajj). From the 90's, It gave rise to quality rock bands, not only the urban place from Dhaka but also the port city Chittagong.

== Media and cinema ==
The Bangladeshi press is diverse, outspoken and privately owned. Over 200 newspapers are published in the country. Bangladesh Betar is the state-run radio service. The British Broadcasting Corporation operates the popular BBC Bangla news and current affairs service. Bengali broadcasts from Voice of America are also very popular. Bangladesh Television (BTV) is the state-owned television network. There are more than 20 privately owned television networks, including several news channels. Freedom of the media remains a major concern, due to government attempts at censorship and harassment of journalists.

The cinema of Bangladesh dates back to 1898 when films began screening at the Crown Theatre in Dhaka. The first bioscope in the subcontinent was established in Dhaka that year. The Dhaka Nawab Family patronized the production of several silent films in the 1920s and 30s. In 1931, the East Bengal Cinematograph Society released the first full-length feature film in Bangladesh, titled the Last Kiss. The first feature film in East Pakistan, Mukh O Mukhosh, was released in 1956. During the 1960s, 25–30 films were produced annually in Dhaka. By the 2000s, Bangladesh produced 80–100 films a year. While the Bangladeshi film industry has achieved limited commercial success; the country has produced notable independent film makers. Zahir Raihan was a prominent documentary-maker who was assassinated in 1971. The late Tareque Masud is regarded as one of Bangladesh's outstanding directors due to his numerous productions on historical and social issues. Masud was honored by FIPRESCI at the Cannes Film Festival in 2002 for his film The Clay Bird. Tanvir Mokammel, Mostofa Sarwar Farooki, Humayun Ahmed, Alamgir Kabir, Subhash Dutta and Chashi Nazrul Islam are other prominent directors of Bangladesh cinema.

== Festivals and celebrations ==
Festivals and celebrations are an integral part of the culture of Bangladesh. Pohela Falgun, Pohela Boishakh for Bengali and Boishabi for hill tracks tribal, Matribhasha dibosh, victory day, Nobanno, Pitha Utshob in winter, Poush Songkranti and chaitro sankranti in the last day of Bangla month chaitro, Shakhrain are celebrated by everyone despite their religion. Muslim festivals of Eid ul-Fitr, Eid ul-Adha, Milad un Nabi, Muharram, Chand raat, Shab-e-Barat, Bishwa Ijtema; Hindu festivals of Durga Puja, Kali Puja, Basant Panchami, Rath Yatra, Holi and Janmashtami; Buddhist festival of Buddha Purnima and Maghi Purnima; Christian festival of Christmas and Easter and secular festivals like Pohela Boishakh, Pohela Falgun, Shakrain, Borsha Mongol, Nabanna, Language Movement Day, Independence Day, Rabindra Jayanti, Nazrul Jayanti witness widespread celebrations and usually are national holidays in Bangladesh.

=== Eid ul-Fitr ===
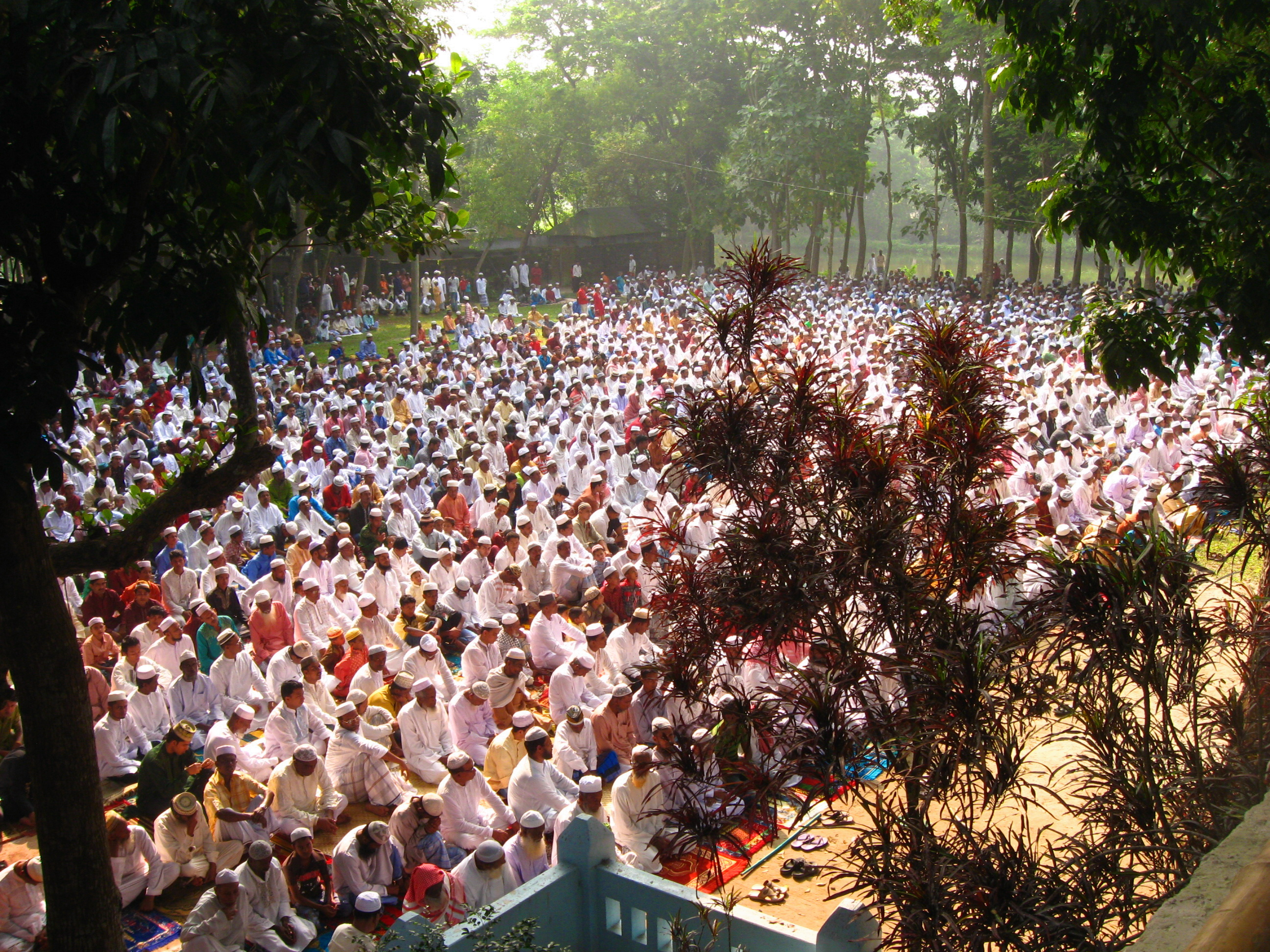
A rural congregation for Eid-al-Fitr prayers

As the most important religious festival for the majority of Muslims, the celebration of Eid ul-Fitr has become a part of the culture of Bangladesh. The government of Bangladesh declares the holiday for three days on Eid-ul Fitr. But practically, all schools, colleges, and offices remain closed for a week. This is the happiest time of the year for most of the people in Bangladesh. All outgoing public transport from the major cities become highly crowded and in many cases the fares tend to rise in spite of government restrictions. Bengali newspapers regularly publish special issues called "Eid Shongkhha" (Bengali: ঈদ সংখ্যা) (Eid edition). Stories, novels, poems, history, essays and other elements are made interesting in the Eid Shongkhha Magazine. There are also many advertisements. Like many other aspects of the Eid festival, publishing Eid Shonkhya has also become a big Bengali tradition. On Eid day, the Eid prayers are held all over the country, in open areas like fields, Eidgahs or inside mosques. After the Eid prayers, people return home, visit each other's home and eat sweet dishes called shirini, shemai and other delicacies like biryani, korma, haleem, kebab etc. Throughout the day people embrace each other and exchange greetings. It is also customary for junior members of the society to touch the feet of the seniors, and seniors returning blessings (sometimes with a small sum of money as a gift). Money and food are donated to the poor. In rural areas, the Eid festival is observed with great fanfare. Quiet remote villages become crowded. In some areas, Eid fairs are arranged. Different types of games including boat racing, kabaddi, and other traditional Bangladeshi games, as well as modern games like cricket and football, are played on this occasion. In urban areas, people play music, visit each other's houses, arrange picnics and eat special food. The homes, streets, markets, and parks are illuminated with lighting decorations in the evening. Watching movies and television programs have also become an integral part of the Eid celebration in urban areas. All local TV channels air special program for several days for this occasion. various cultural products, traditional handicrafts, toys, cosmetics, as well as various kinds of food and sweets are sold usually in front of eidgahs and mosques. Small cultural processions are arranged in Old Dhaka, a tradition which was started by Naib Nazim of Dhaka

=== Eid ul-Azha ===
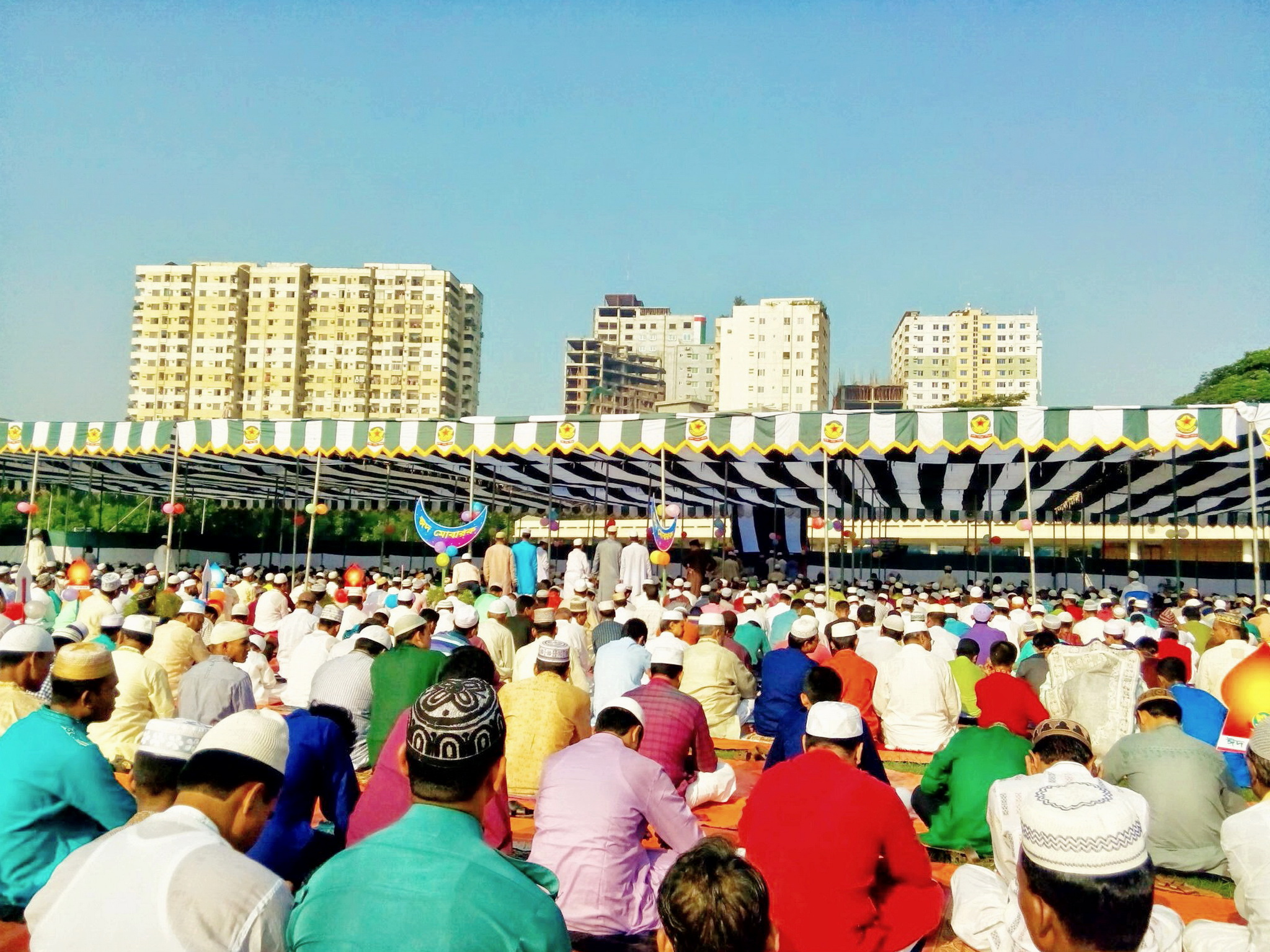
An urban congregation for Eid-ul-Azha prayers in Dhaka.

Eid ul-Azha or Bakri Eid is the second most important religious festival. The celebration of this festival is similar to Eid ul-Fitr in many ways. The only big difference is the kurbani or sacrifice of domestic animals. Numerous temporary marketplaces of different sizes called hat operate in the big cities for sale of Qurbani animals (usually cows, goats, and sheep). In the morning on the Eid day, immediately after the prayer, affluent people thank God for the animal and then sacrifice it. Less affluent people also take part in the festivity by visiting houses of the affluent who are taking part in kurbani. After the kurbani, a large portion of the meat is given to the poor people and to the relatives and neighbors. Although the religious doctrine allows the sacrifice anytime over a period of three days starting from the Eid day, most people prefer to perform the ritual on the first day of Eid. However, the public holiday spans over three to four days. Many people from the big cities go to their ancestral houses and homes in the villages to share the joy of the festival with friends and relatives. Various agricultural products, traditional handicrafts, toys, cosmetics, as well as various kinds of food and sweets are sold in front of mosques and other public places.

=== Pohela Boishakh ===
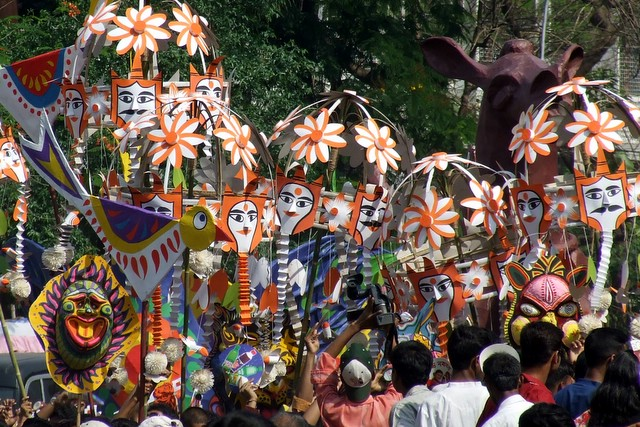
Pohela Boishakh celebration in Dhaka, Bangladesh

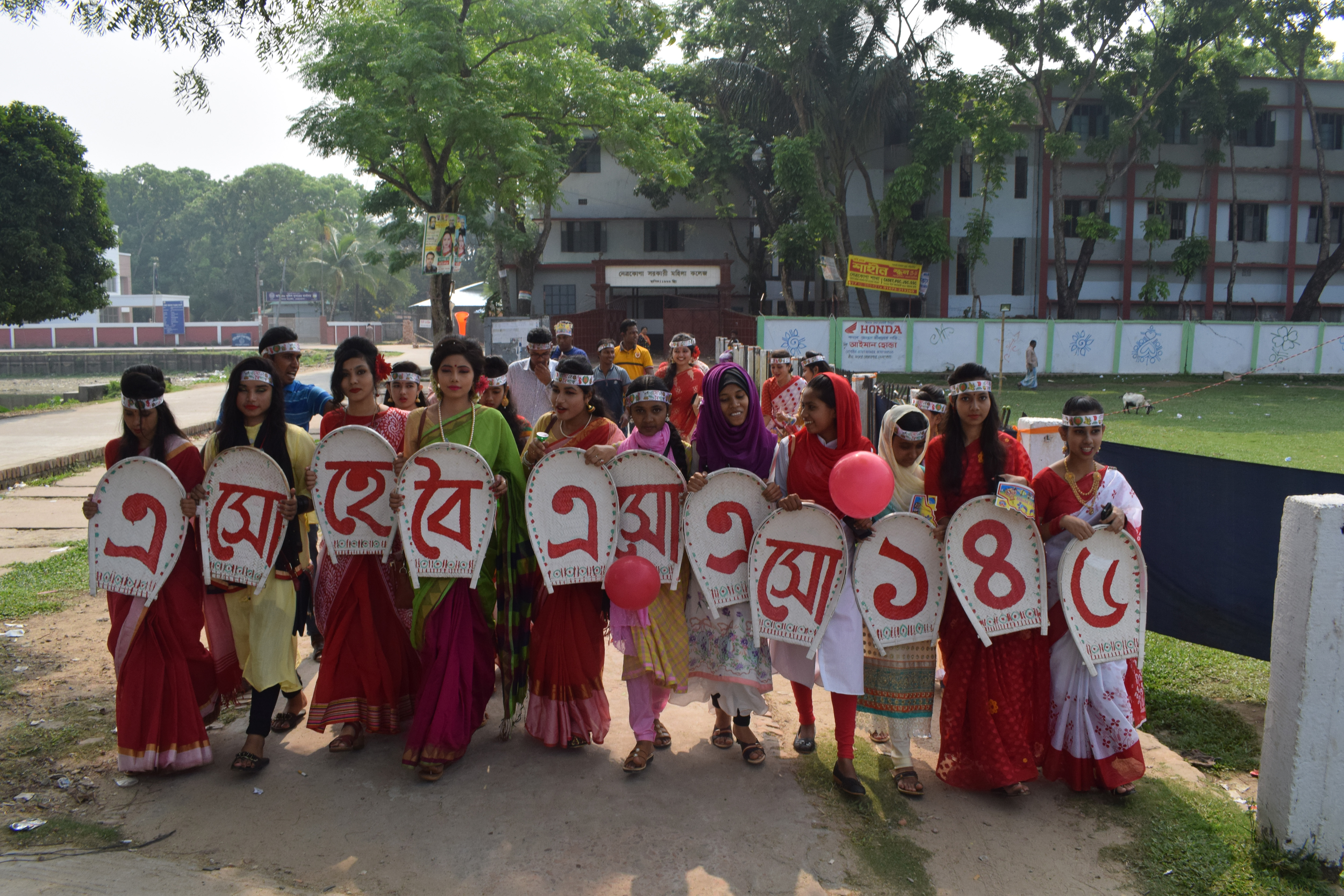

Pahela Baishakh, which is also pronounced as Pohela Boishakh, is the first day of the Bengali calendar. It is usually celebrated on 14 April. Pohela Boishakh marks the start day of the crop season. Just like Eid, usually, on Pohela Boishakh, the home is thoroughly scrubbed and cleaned; people bathe early in the morning and dress in fine clothes. They spend much of the day visiting relatives, friends, and neighbors and going to the fair. Fairs are arranged in many parts of the country where various agricultural products, traditional handicrafts, toys, cosmetics, as well as various kinds of food and sweets are sold. The fairs also provide entertainment, with singers, dancers, and traditional plays and songs. Horse races, bull races, bull-fights, cock-fights, flying pigeons, and boat racing were once popular. All gatherings and fairs consist of a wide spread of Bengali food and sweets. The most colorful New Year's Day festival takes place in Dhaka. Large numbers of people gather early in the morning under the banyan tree at Ramna Park where Chhayanaut artists open the day with Rabindranath Tagore's famous song, Esho, hey Boishakh, esho esho (Come, Boishakh, come, come). A similar ceremony welcoming the new year is also held at the Faculty of Fine Arts, University of Dhaka. Students and teachers of the institute take out a colorful procession and parade called Mangal Shobhajatra to round the campus and the surroundings of the campus through Shahabag Avenue. Social and cultural organizations celebrate the day with cultural programs in various field in the University of Dhaka as well as across the country. In this special day girls used to wear white Sharee with red line, in opposition boys wear fotua with pant. Newspapers bring out special supplements. There are also special programs on radio and television. Prior to this day, special discounts on clothes, furniture, electronics, and various deals and shopping discounts are available. A special line of shari, usually cotton, white sharis with red print and embroidery is sold before this day as everyone dresses up for this day. Jasmine and marigold flowers are also a huge sale for this event which adorns the women's hair.

=== Nobanno ===
The harvest festival is called the Nobanno. It is usually celebrated on the first day of Awgrohayon (Bengali Month) the first day of harvesting. The main festival is organizing by Jatio Nobanno Utshob Udjapan Porishod at Charukola (Fine Arts) in University of Dhaka with songs, dance, cakes, sweets, colorful procession and many traditional presentations. Once upon a time (from the very beginning), the first day of Awgrohayon was the first day of Bengali calendar.

=== Language day ===
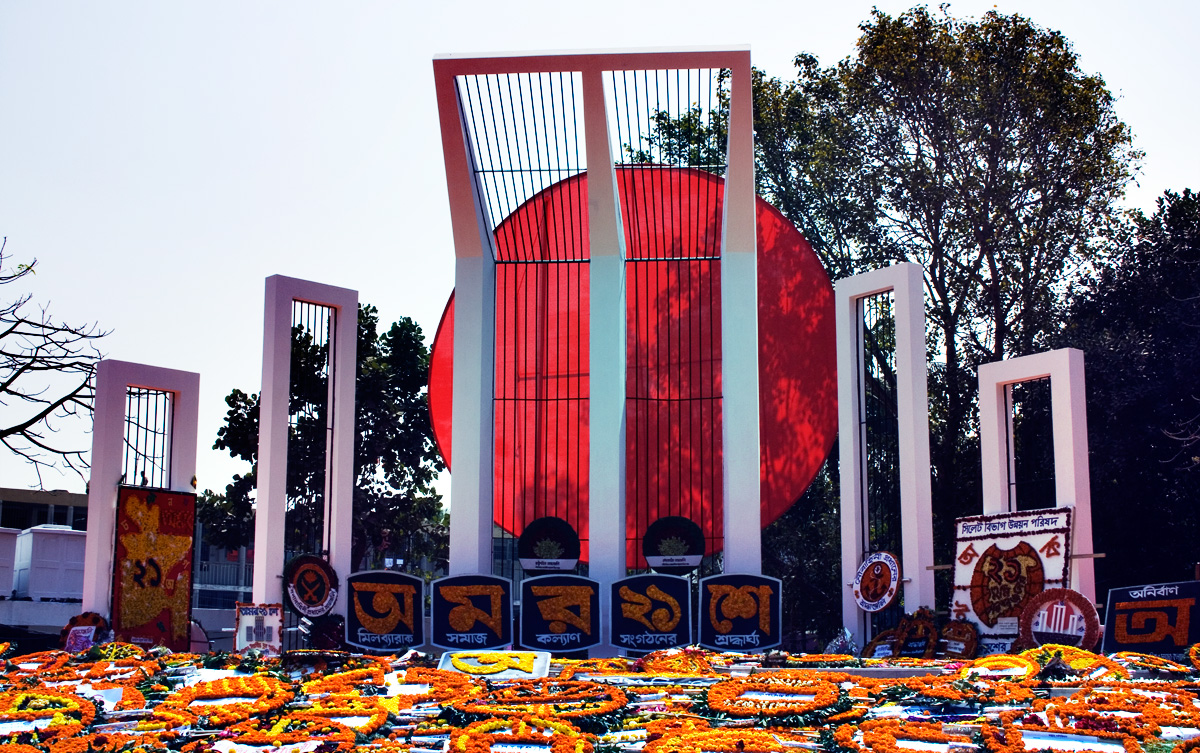
Shaheed Minar (Martyr Monument) People commemorates those who were killed in the 21 February 1952 Bengali Language Movement demonstration

In 1952, the emerging middle classes of East Bengal underwent an uprising known later as the Bangla Language Movement. Bangladeshis (then East Pakistanis) were initially agitated by a decision by the Central Pakistan Government to establish Urdu, a minority language spoken only by the supposed elite class of West Pakistan, as the sole national language for all of Pakistan. The situation was worsened by an open declaration that "Urdu and only Urdu will be the national language of Pakistan" by the governor, Khawaja Nazimuddin. Police declared Section 144 which banned any sort of meeting. Defying this, the students of the University of Dhaka and Dhaka Medical College and other political activists started a procession on 21 February 1952. Near the current Dhaka Medical College Hospital, police fired on the protesters and numerous people, including Abdus Salam, Rafiq Uddin Ahmed, Sofiur Rahman, Abul Barkat, and Abdul Jabbar died. The movement spread to the whole of East Pakistan and the whole province came to a standstill. Afterward, the Government of Pakistan relented and gave Bengali equal status as a national language. This movement is thought to have sown the seeds for the independence movement which resulted in the liberation of Bangladesh in 1971. To commemorate this movement, Shaheed Minar, a solemn and symbolic sculpture, was erected in the place of the massacre. The day is revered in Bangladesh and, to a somewhat lesser extent, in West Bengal as the Martyrs' Day. This day is the public holiday in Bangladesh. UNESCO decided to observe 21 February as International Mother Language Day. The UNESCO General Conference took a decision that took effect on 17 November 1999 when it unanimously adopted a draft resolution submitted by Bangladesh and co-sponsored and supported by 28 other countries.

=== Durga Puja ===
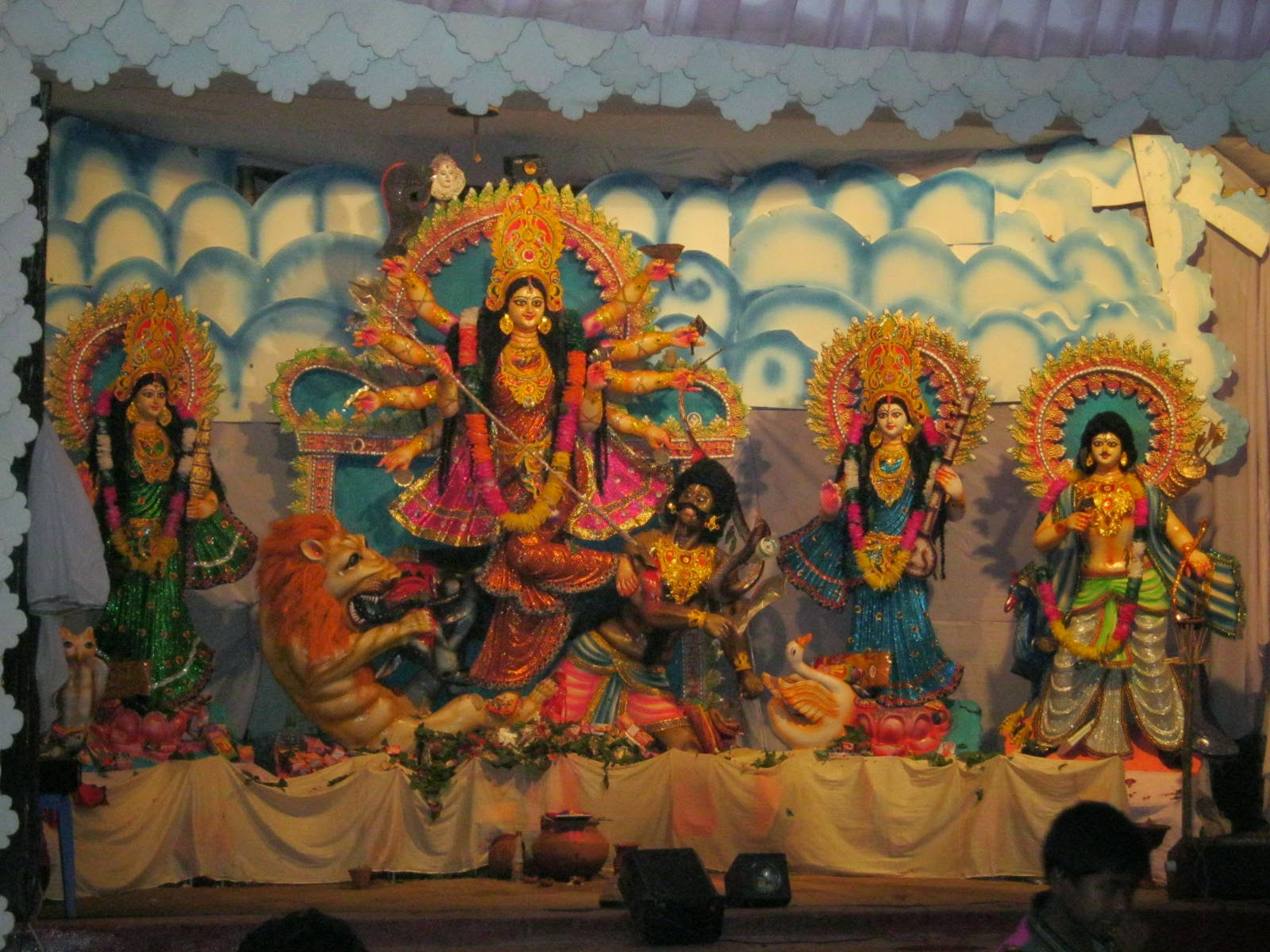
Durga Puja in Bangladesh

Durga Puja, the largest religious festival for Bengali Hindus, is celebrated widely across Bangladesh. Thousands of pandals (mandaps) are set up in various villages, towns, and cities. Durga Puja is a grand cultural celebration in the capital city of Dhaka. Major pujas of Dhaka are held in numerous pandals, but the biggest celebration takes place at Dhakeshwari Temple where several thousand devotees and onlookers stream through the premises for four days. Special boat race on Buriganga river is arranged and it attracts a large crowd. A five-day holiday is observed by all educational institutions, while Bijoya Dashami is a public holiday. Just like East India and West India on Vijayadashami, effigies are paraded through the streets of Shankhari Bazaar in Old Dhaka in loud, colorful processions before being immersed into the rivers.

=== Boro din (Christmas) ===
Christians in Bangladesh give gifts to each other and visit others on Christmas. Christmas is national holiday in Bangladesh. Kids receive money or toys from adults. People greet each other with Shubho Boro Din ('Greetings of the Great Day'). In rural areas, banana trees and leaves are used for decoration. In cities, common Christmas decorations include Christmas trees, banners and balloons. Special events are held in hotels and Christmas specials are shown on TV. Traditional foods include Christmas cake, pitha, and biscuits. Churches are decorated with Christmas lights and a Christmas tree. Church choirs perform Bengali Christmas carols. Church-held Christmas Eve feasts are called Preeti Bhoj and hymns are called Kirtan.

=== Weddings ===
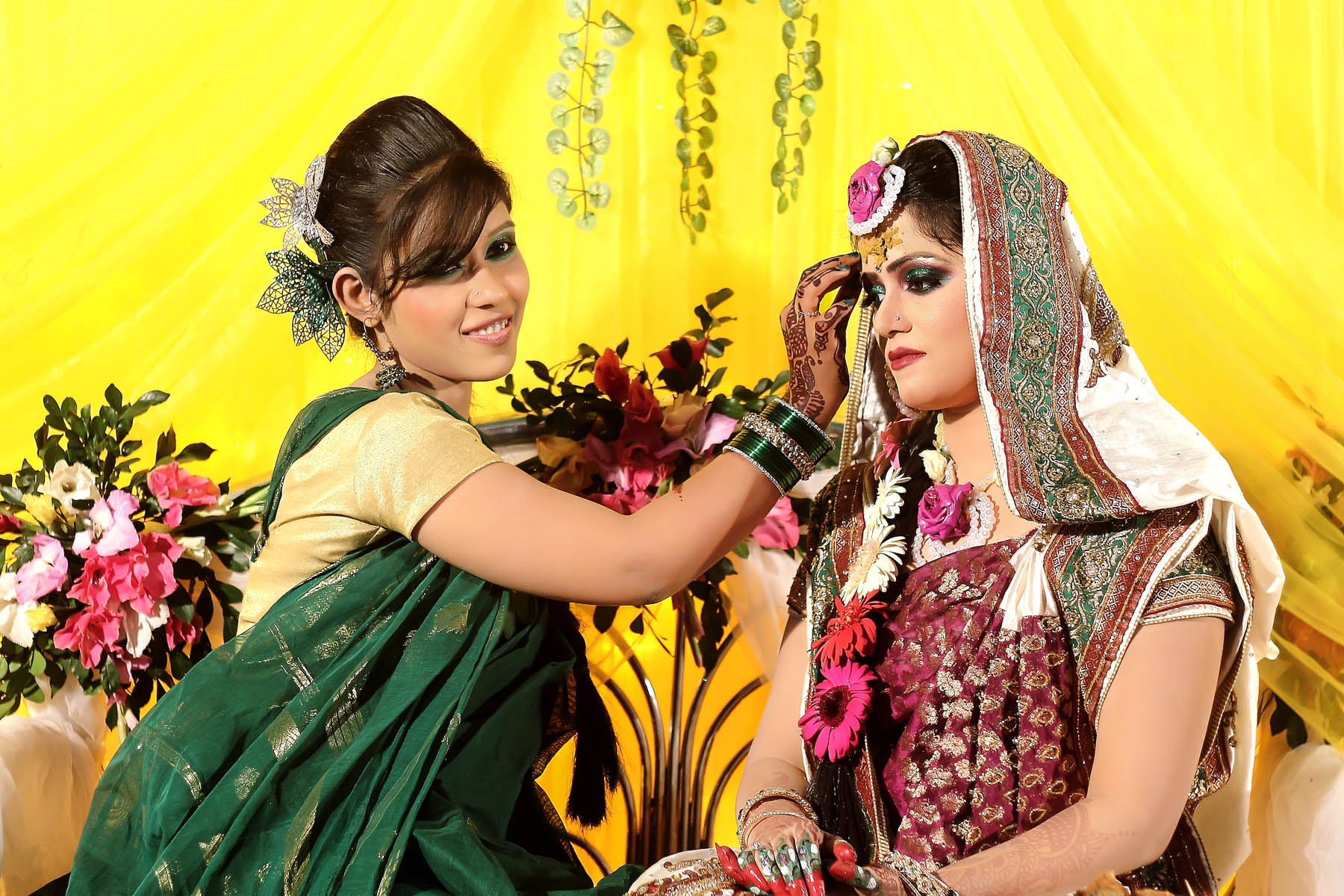
Relatives decorating the bride with traditional wedding turmeric in a Bangladeshi Gaye holud ceremony in Dhaka.

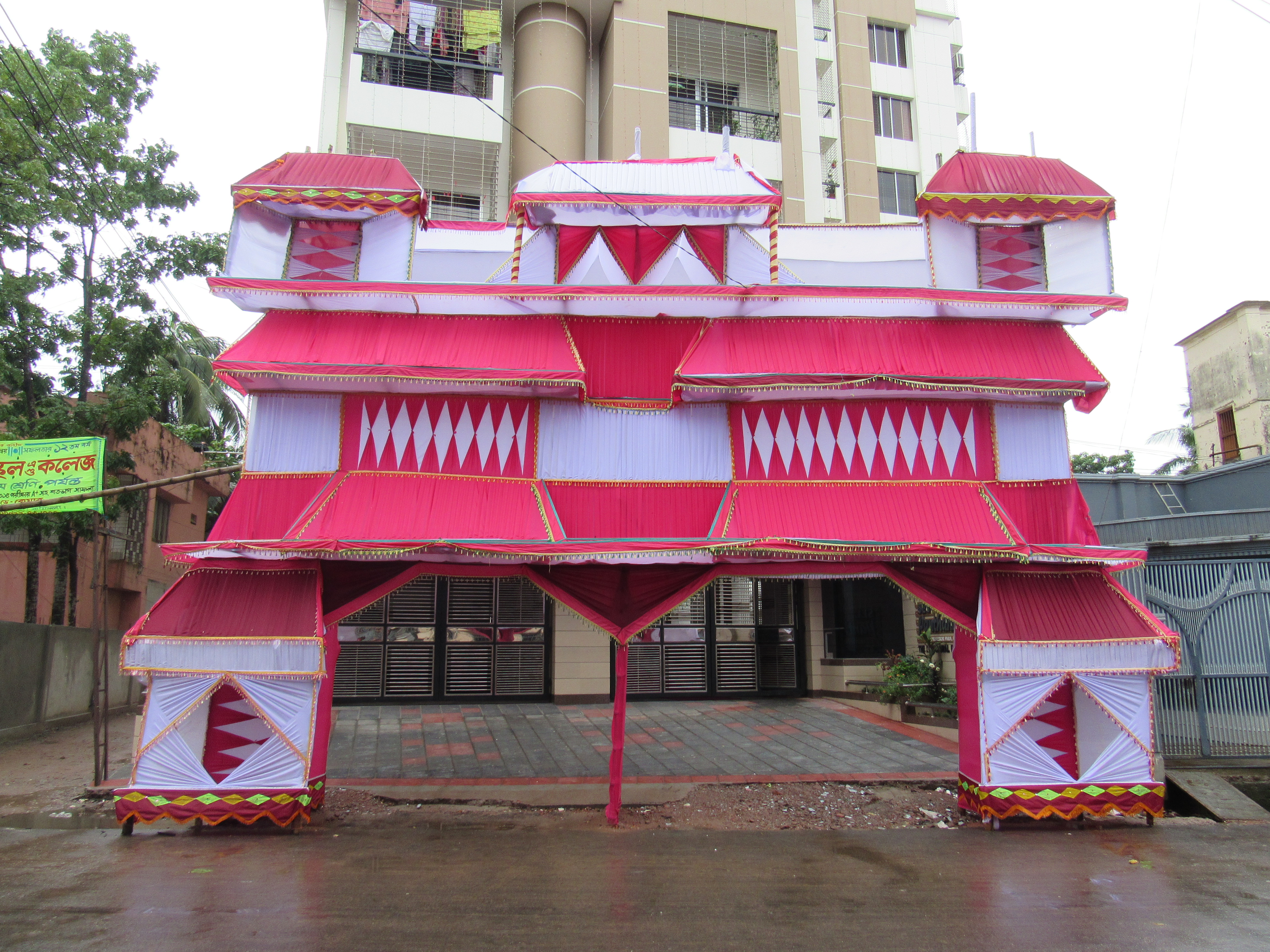
Traditional Bangladeshi wedding ceremony gate in Comilla.

Bengali weddings are traditionally in five parts: first, it is the bride and groom's Mehendi Shondha (also called Pan Chini), the bride's Gaye Holud, the groom's Gaye Holud, the Biye, and the Bou Bhaat. These often take place on separate days. The first event in a wedding is an informal one: the groom presents the bride with a ring marking the "engagement" which is gaining popularity. For the mehendi shondha the bride's side apply henna to each other as well as the bride, for the bride's Gaye Holud, the groom's family – except the groom himself – go in procession to the bride's home. Bride's friends and family apply turmeric paste to her body as a part of bride's Gaye Holud, and they are traditionally all in matching clothes, mostly orange. The bride is seated on a dais, and the henna is used to decorate the bride's hands and feet with elaborate abstract designs. The sweets are then fed to the bride by all involved, piece by piece. The actual wedding ceremony "Biye" follows the Gaye Holud ceremonies. The wedding ceremony is arranged by the bride's family. On the day, the younger members of the bride's family barricade the entrance to the venue and demand a sort of admission charge from the groom in return for allowing him to enter. The bride and groom are seated separately, and a Kazi (authorized person by the government to perform the wedding), accompanied by the parents and a Wakil (witness) from each side formally asks the bride for her consent to the union, and then the groom for his. The bride's side of the family tries to play some kind of practical joke on the groom such as stealing the groom's shoe. The reception, also known as Bou-Bhaat (reception), is a party given by the groom's family in return for the wedding party. It is typically a much more relaxed affair, with only the second-best wedding outfit being worn. This is more or less the Muslim wedding procession. The Hindu weddings also follow the same parts of the wedding but the wedding part is somewhat different. The wedding is done along with a feast and according to the Hindu religion's wedding steps, e.g. Shat-pake-badha; Shidur Daan etc. the wedding most likely lasts the whole night starting at the evening. The Christian and Buddhist Wedding follow a totally different Process. They more or less follow Western Culture and Methods. Sometimes they too follow the Bengali wedding procession.

== Architecture and heritage ==
Bangladesh has appealing architecture from historic treasures to contemporary landmarks. It has evolved over centuries and assimilated influences from social, religious and exotic communities. Bangladesh has many architectural relics and monuments dating back thousands of years.

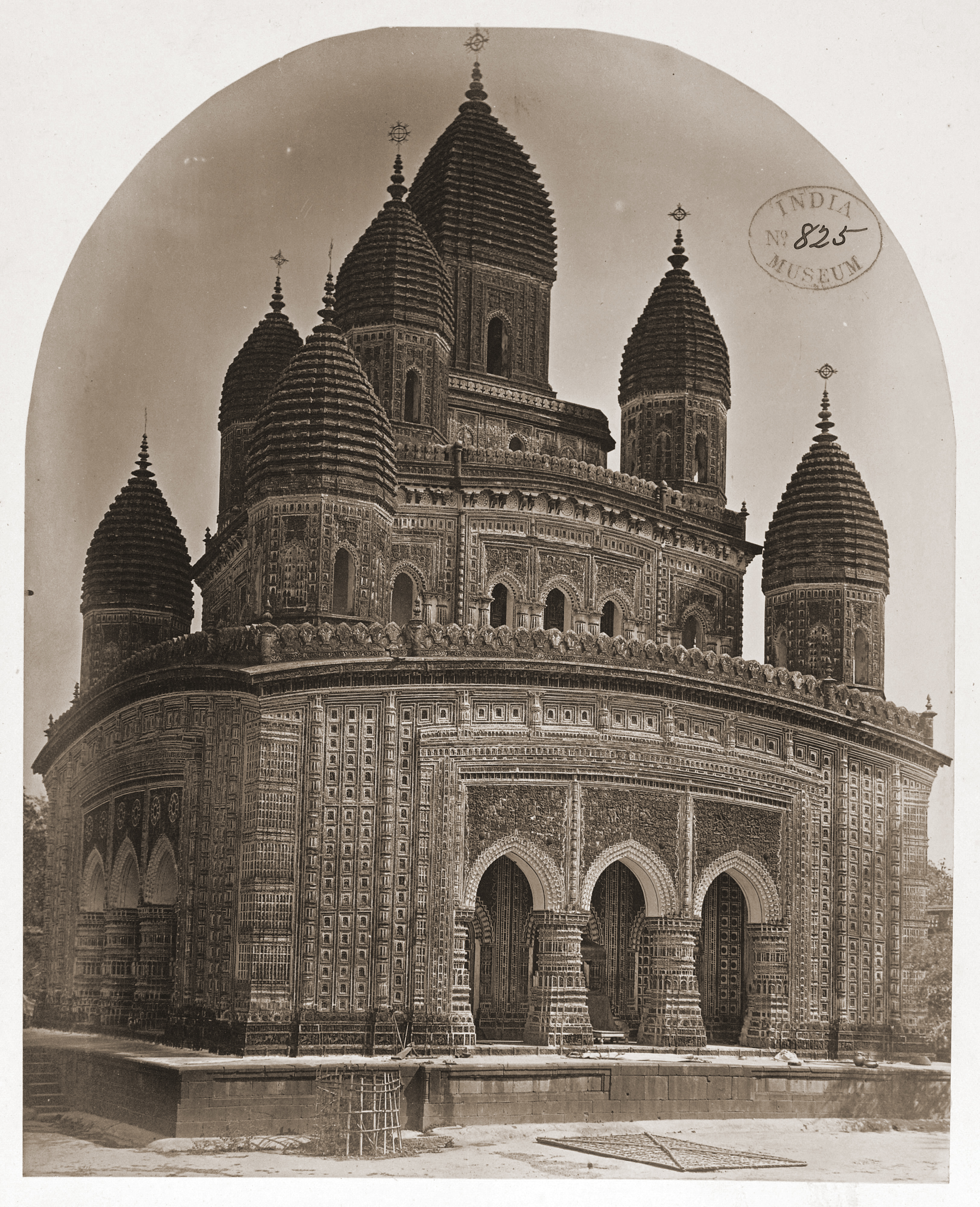
1752 Kantajew Temple, prominent Hindu architecture of Bangladesh.

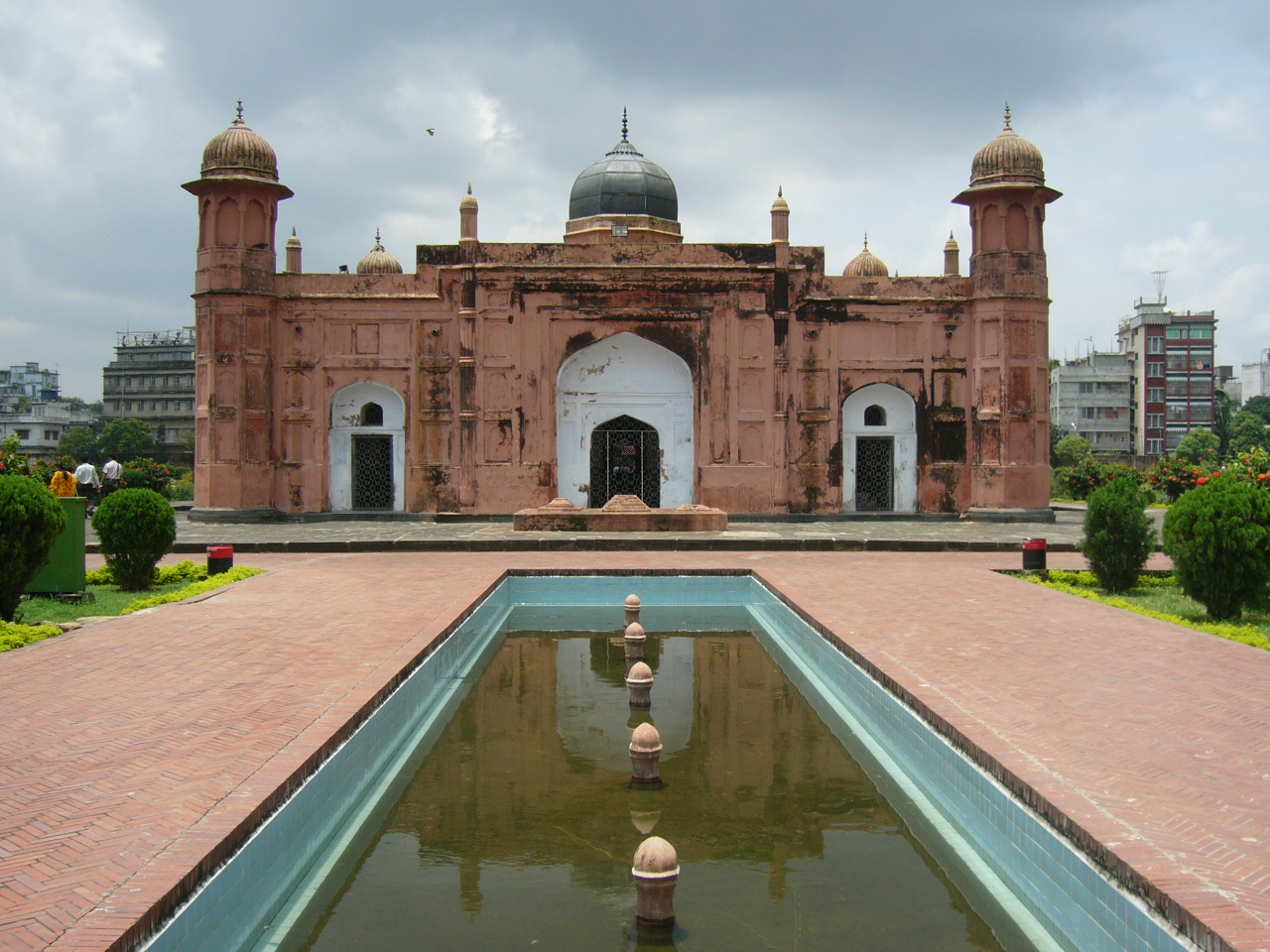
Lalbagh Fort, a Mughal architecture of Bangladesh

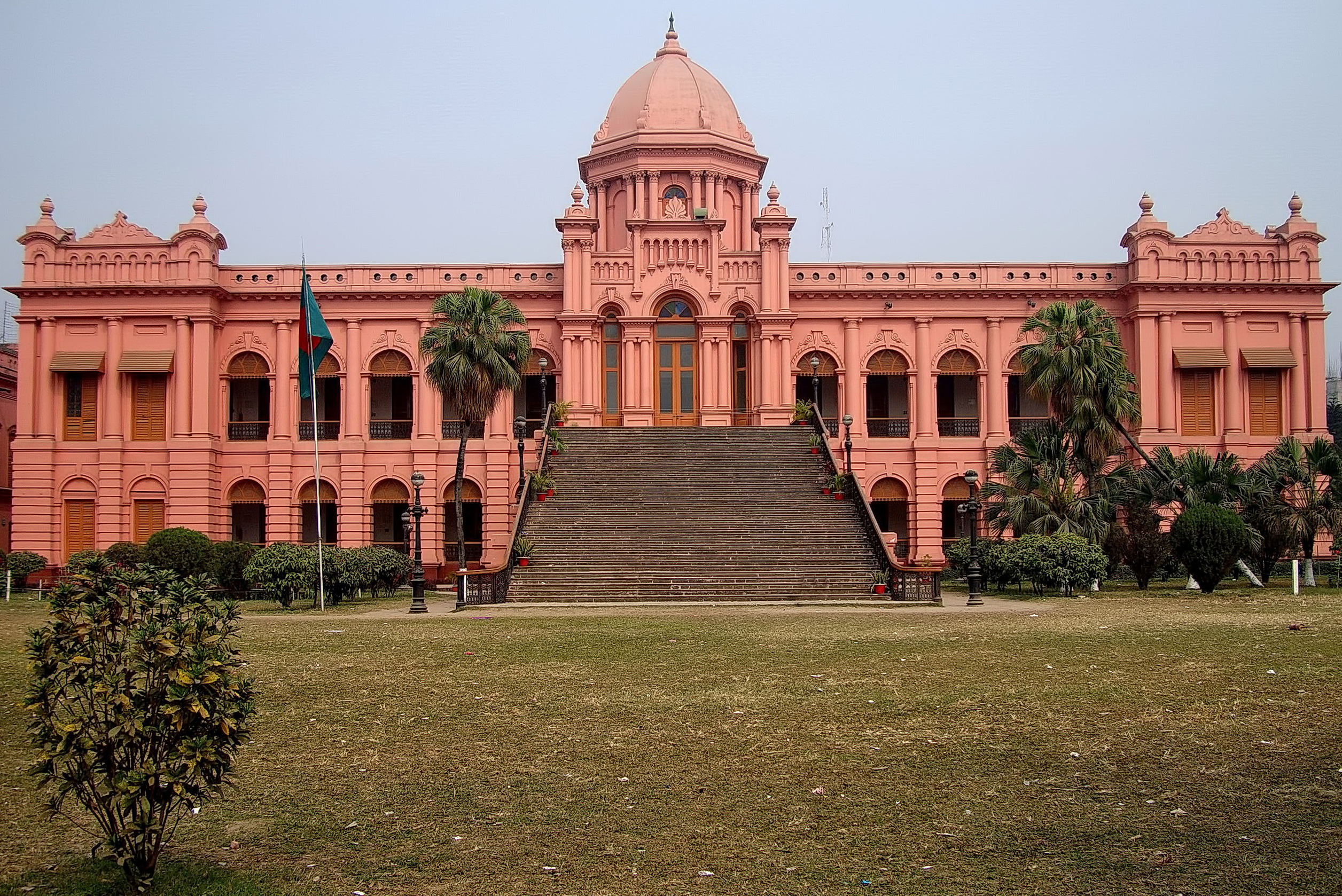
Ahsan Manzil in Dhaka, Indo-Saracenic Revival architecture of Bangladesh

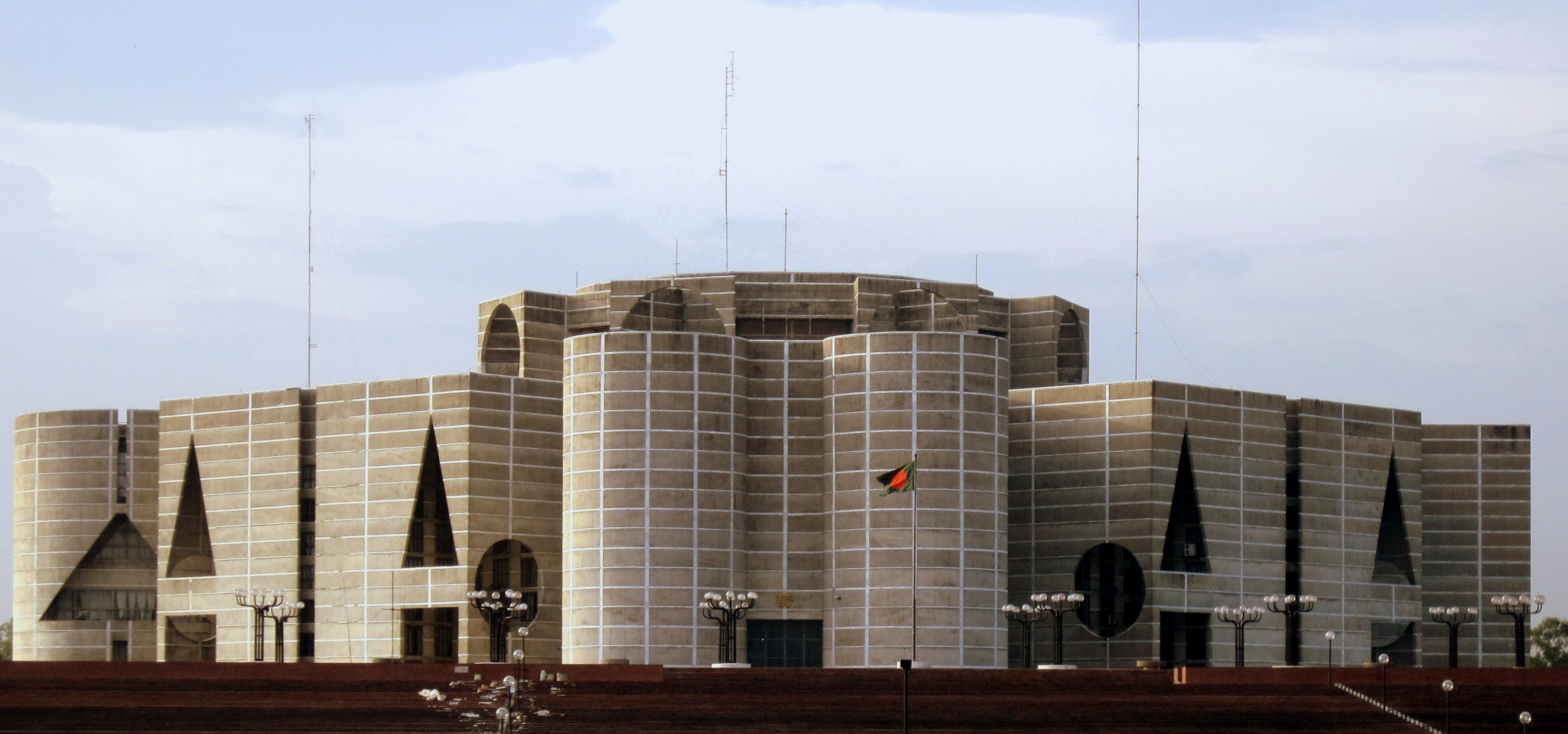
Jatiyo Sangsad Bhaban, the house of the Parliament of Bangladesh.

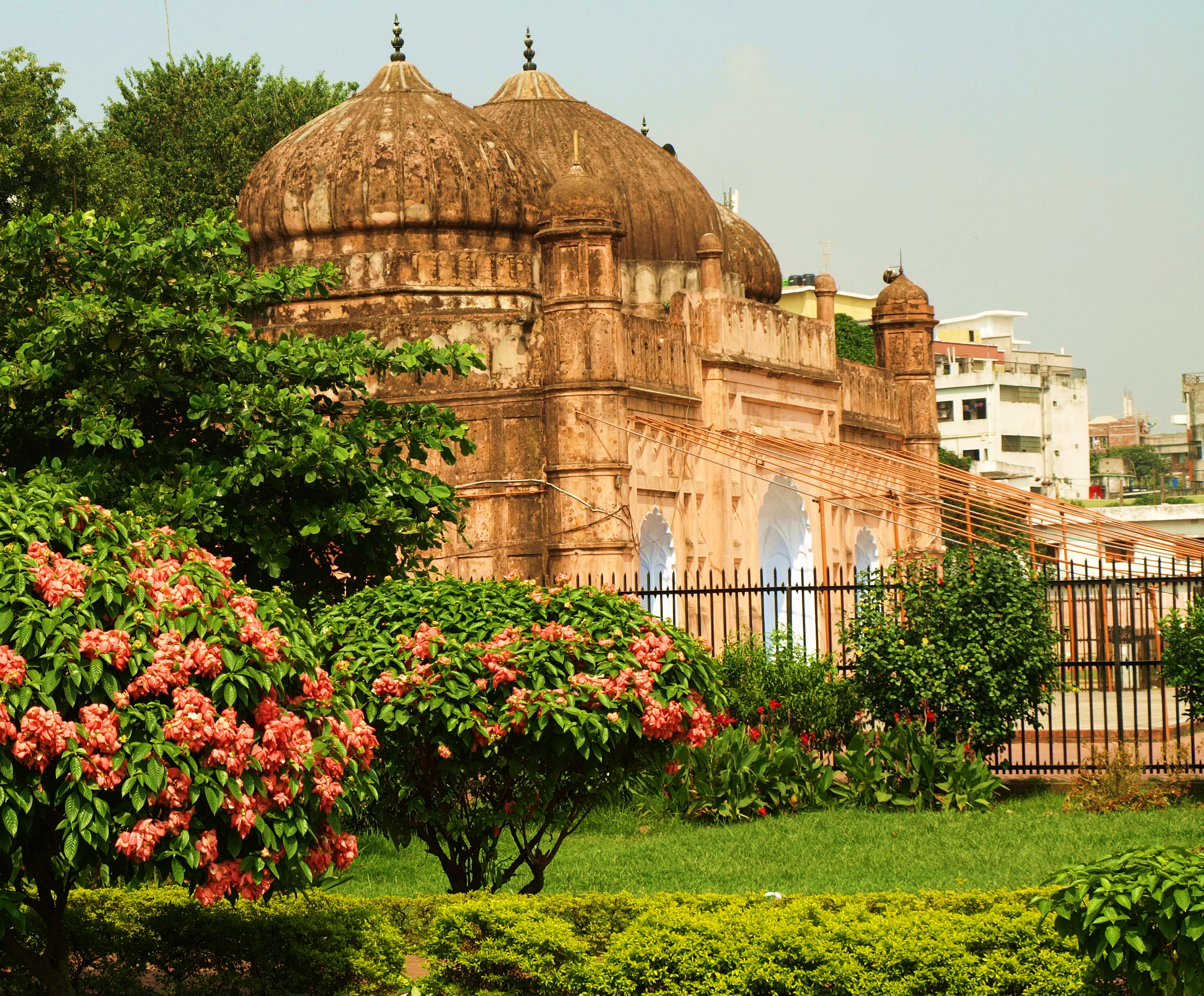
Lalbagh Fort

=== World Heritage Sites ===
Site	Image	Location	Criteria	Year
Historic Mosque City of Bagerhat	Building of red bricks with a roof consisting of many white domes. There are small round towers on the corners of the building each crowned by a white cupola.	Bagerhat District, Khulna Division; 22°40′0″N 89°48′0″E	Cultural: (iv)	1983
Ruins of the Buddhist Vihara at Paharpur	Ruins of a structure of red stone now resembling a small hill or mound.	Naogaon District, Rajshahi Division; 25°2′0″N 88°59′0″E	Cultural: (i, ii, vi)	1985
The Sundarbans	Boat on a river in a densely forested plain.	Khulna Division; 21°57′0″N 89°11′0″E	Natural: (ix, x)	1997

=== UNESCO Intangible Cultural Heritage Lists ===
	Year Proclaimed^{[B]}	Year Inscribed^{[C]}
Baul songs	2005	2008
Traditional art of Jamdani weaving		2013
Mangal Shobhajatra on Pahela Baishakh		2016
Traditional art of Shital Pati weaving of Sylhet		2017

=== Memory of the World Register ===
- 7 March Speech of Bangabandhu

== Sports ==
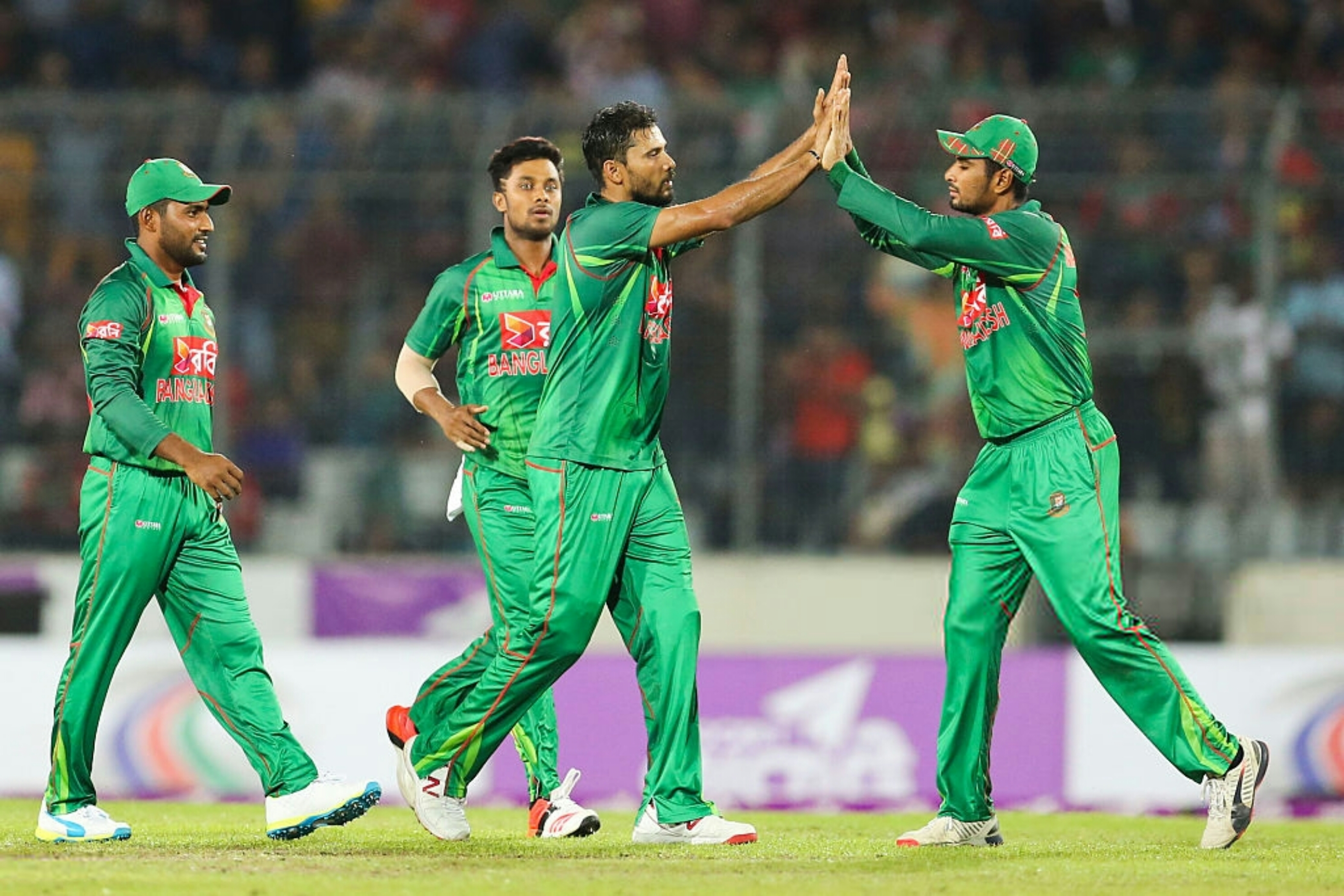
Bangladesh cricket team

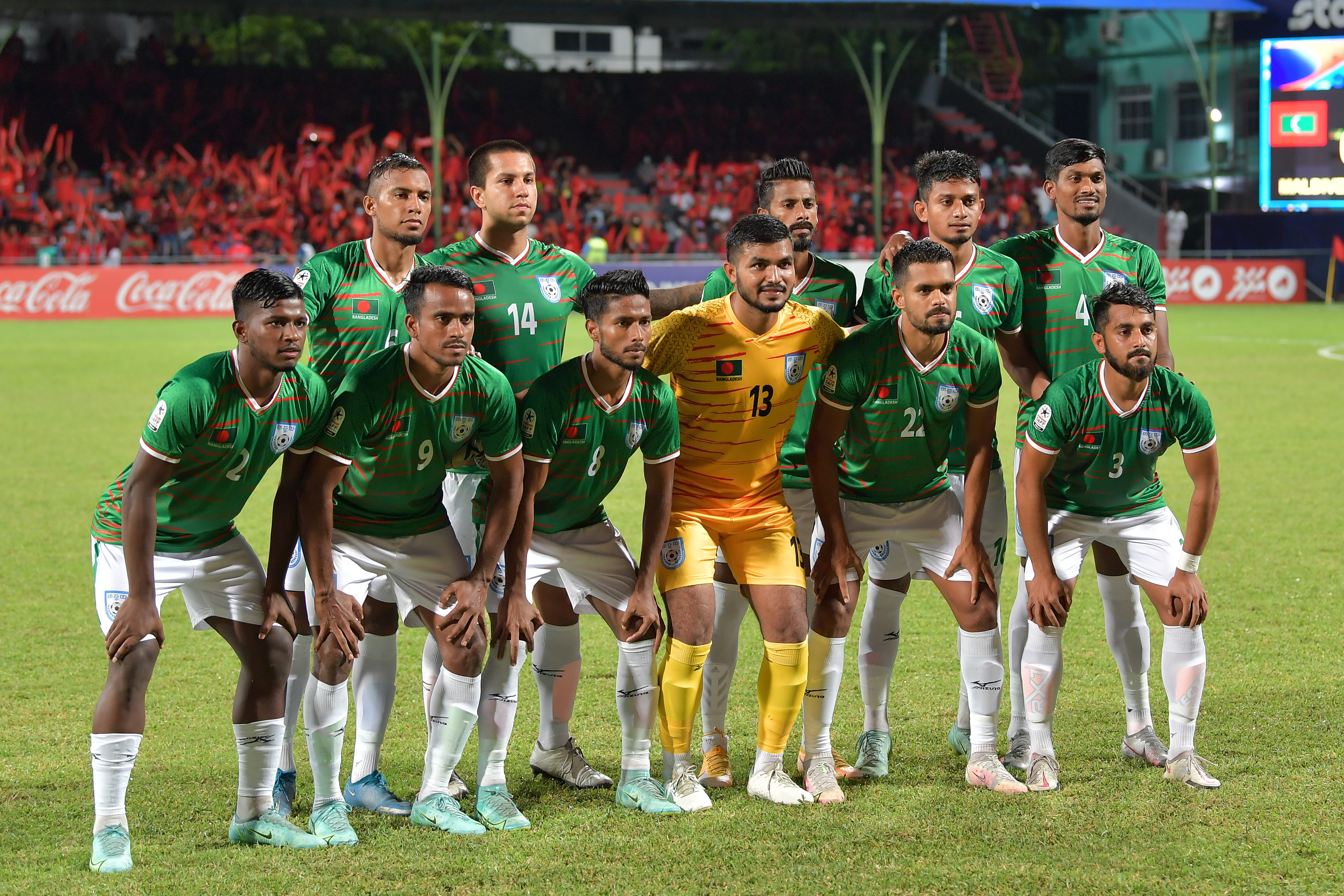
Bangladesh Football Team

Cricket is the most popular sport in Bangladesh, followed by football. Kabaddi is the national sport in Bangladesh. Cricket is a game which has a massive and passionate following in Bangladesh. Bangladesh has joined the elite group of countries eligible to play Test cricket since 2000. The Bangladesh national cricket team goes by the nickname of the Tigers – after the royal Bengal tiger. Football in Bangladesh is one of the most enjoyed sports, although the Bangladesh national football team used to be a lot stronger in the past, people still gather in masses when the national team have a game. The people of Bangladesh enjoy watching live sports. Whenever there is a cricket or football match between popular local teams or international teams in any local stadium significant number of spectators gather to watch the match live. The people also celebrate major victories of the national teams with great enthusiasm for the live game. Victory processions are the most common element in such celebrations. A former prime minister even made an appearance after an International one day cricket match in which Bangladesh beat Australia, she came to congratulate the victory. Also in late 2006 and 2007, football legend Zinedine Zidane paid a visit to local teams and various events thanks to the invitation of Nobel Peace Prize winner Dr. Muhammad Yunus. Some traditional sports of Bangladesh include Nouka Baich, Kho Kho, Boli Khela, Lathi Khela etc.

== Religion ==
Religion in Bangladesh

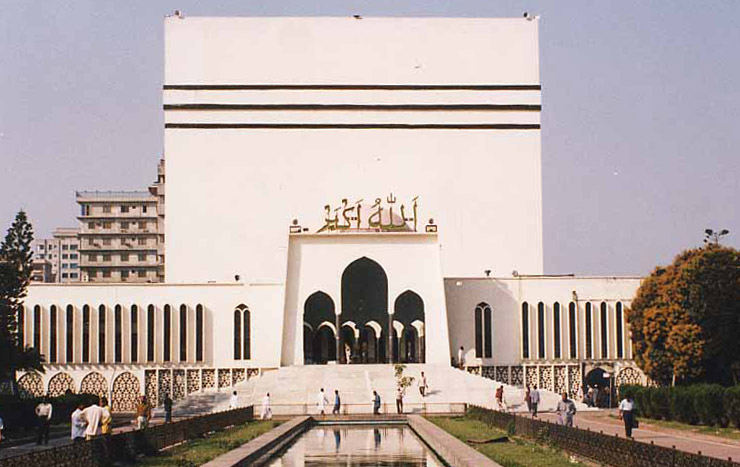
Baitul Mukarram National Mosque

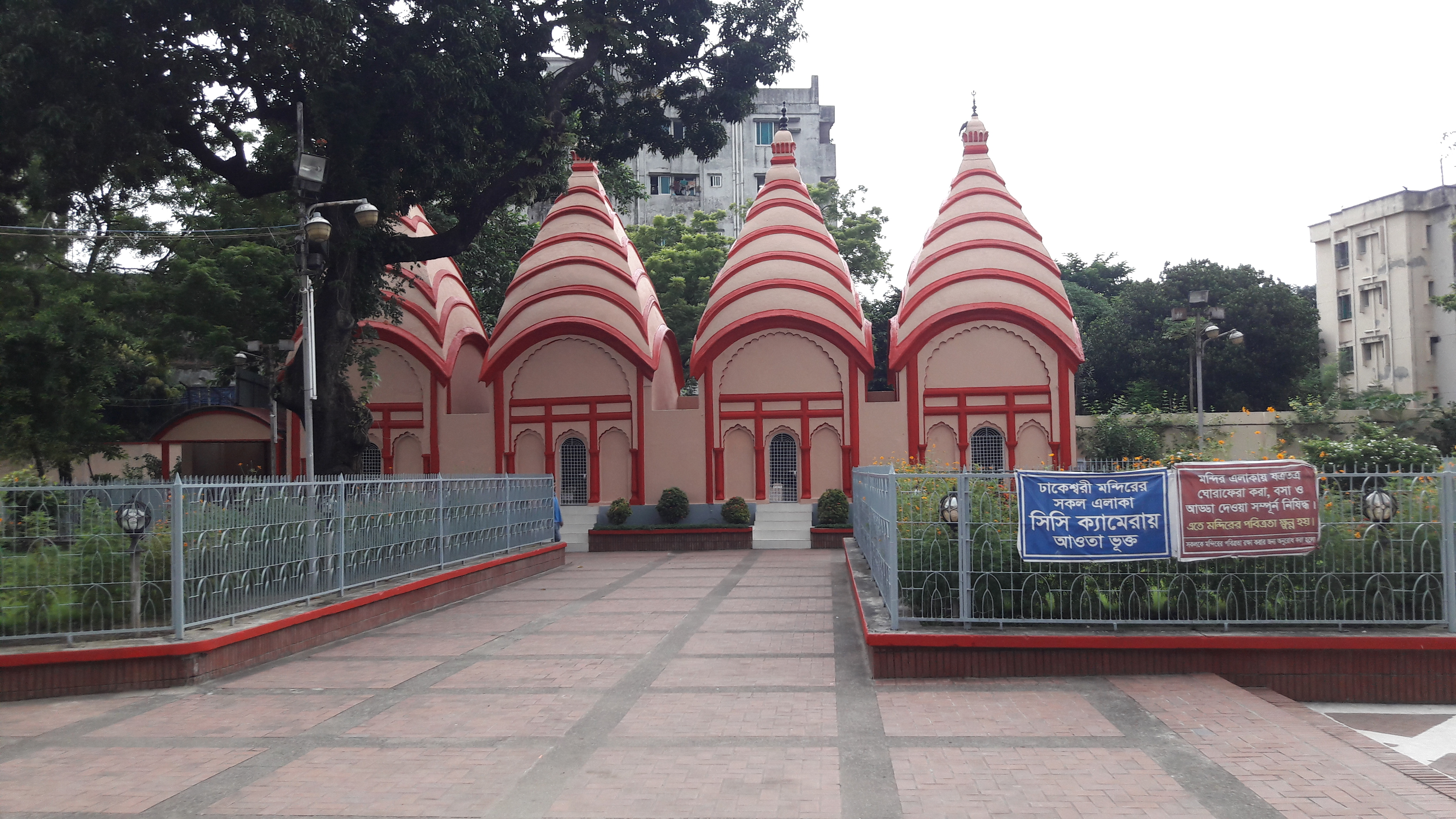
Dhakeshwari National Temple

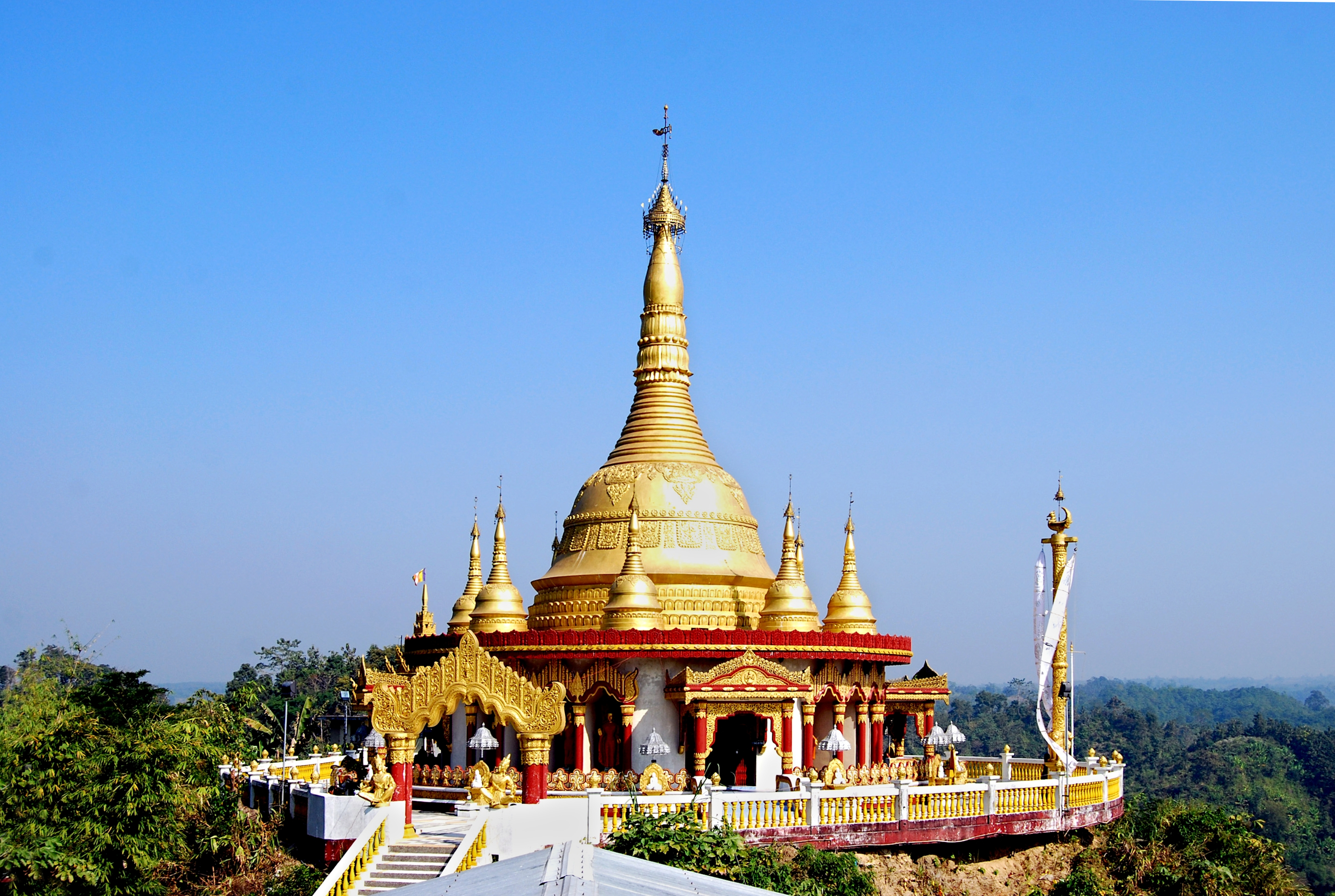
Buddha Dhatu Jadi

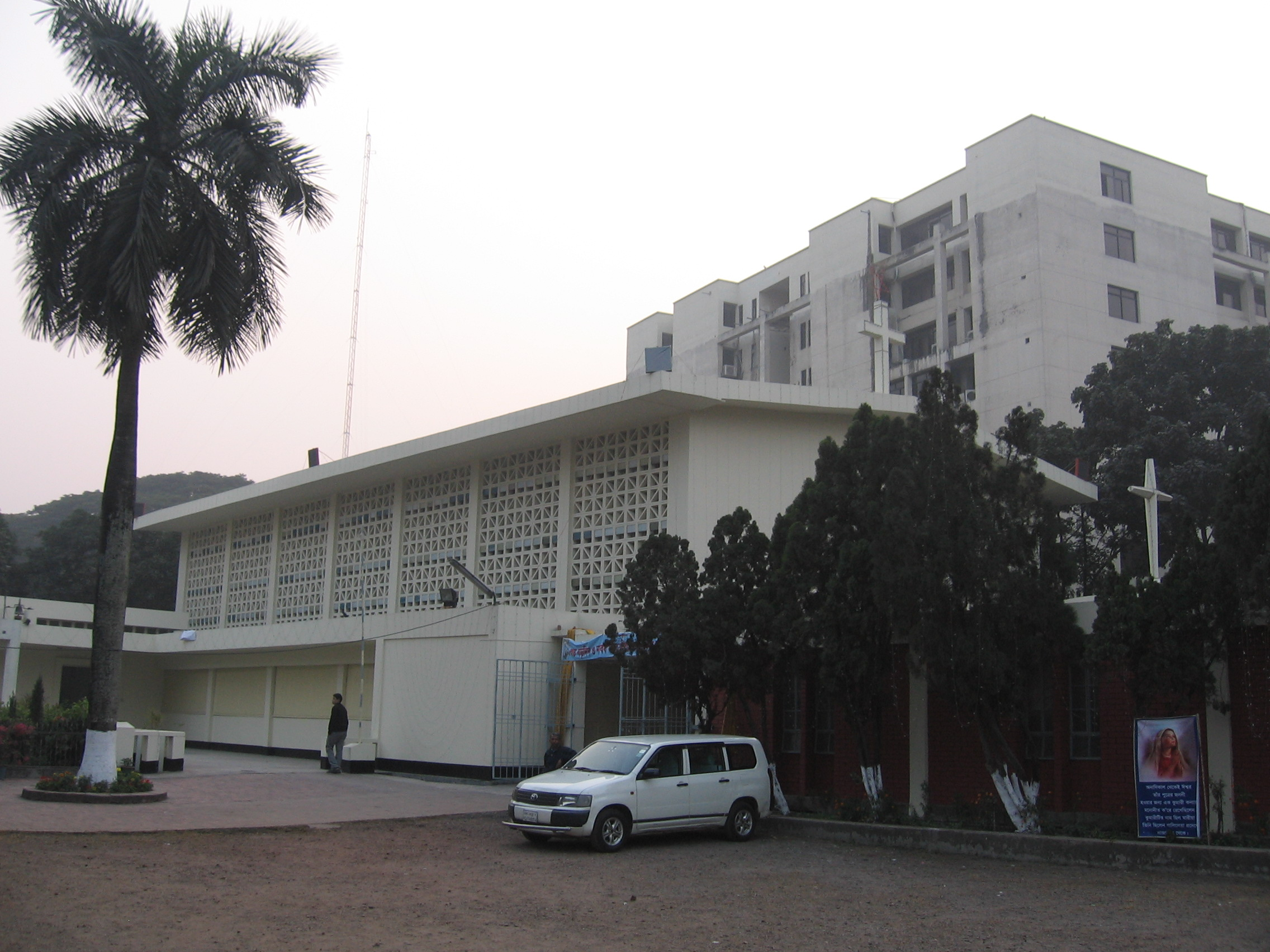
Archdiocese of Dhaka

Bangladesh is ethnically homogeneous, with Bengalis comprising 99% of the population. Bangladesh is a Muslim-majority country. Muslims constitute around 90% of the population in Bangladesh while Hindus and Buddhists are the most significant minorities of the country. Christians, Sikhs, and atheists form a very minuscule part of the population. But due to immense cultural diversity, multiple dialects, hybridization of social traits and norms as well as cultural upbringing, People of different religions perform their religious rituals with festivity in Bangladesh. The Government has declared National Holidays on all important religious festivals of the four major religions. Eid al-Fitr, Durga Puja, Christmas, and Buddha Purnima are celebrated with enthusiasm in Bangladesh. All of these form an integral part of the cultural heritage of Bangladesh. People from several tribal communities like Chakma, Garo, Khasi, Jaintia, Marma, Santhal, Manipuri, Tripuri, Tanchangya, Mru, Mandi, Kuki, Bawm, Oraon, Khiang, Chak, Dhanuk, Munda, Rohingya also have their own respective festivals.

== Lifestyle ==
=== Cuisine ===
Sandesh, a traditional Bangladeshi confectionery made with milk and sugar

Bangladesh is famous for its distinctive culinary tradition, delicious food, snacks, and savories. Rice is the staple food, and is served with a variety of vegetables, fried as well with curry, thick lentil soups, egg, fish and meat preparations of chicken, mutton, beef, duck. Bangladeshis have a sweet tooth. Sweetmeats of Bangladesh are mostly milk based, and consist of several delights including roshogolla, shondesh, roshmalai, gulab jam, kalo jam, and chom-chom, jilapi and more . Several other sweet preparations are also available. Bangladeshi cuisine is rich and varied with the use of many specialised spices and flavours.

Bhortas (lit-"mashed") are a really common type of food used as an additive to rice. There are several types of bhortas, such as ilish bhorta, shutki bhorta, begoon bhorta and more

Fish is the dominant source of protein, cultivated in ponds and fished with nets in the fresh-water rivers of the Ganges delta. More than 40 types of mostly freshwater fish are common, including carp, varieties like rui (rohu), katla, magur (catfish), chingŗi (prawn or shrimp), as well as shuţki machh (dried fish) are popular. Salt water fish ilish (hilsha) is very popular among Bangladeshis can be called an icon of Bangladeshi cuisine. Unlike neighboring West Bengal, serving dishes with beef is not a taboo in Bangladesh as Muslims are the majority. Beef curry is a very common and essential part of Bangladeshi Muslim cuisine.

Pithas are a categories of food which most like crapes and fritters though there exceptions to that such as bibikhana pitha which is like a steamed cake. Pithas are most common in seasons of Shoroth, Hemanto, and Sheet. Popular pitas include teler pitha, patishapta pitha, bhapa pitha and more.

=== Fashion ===
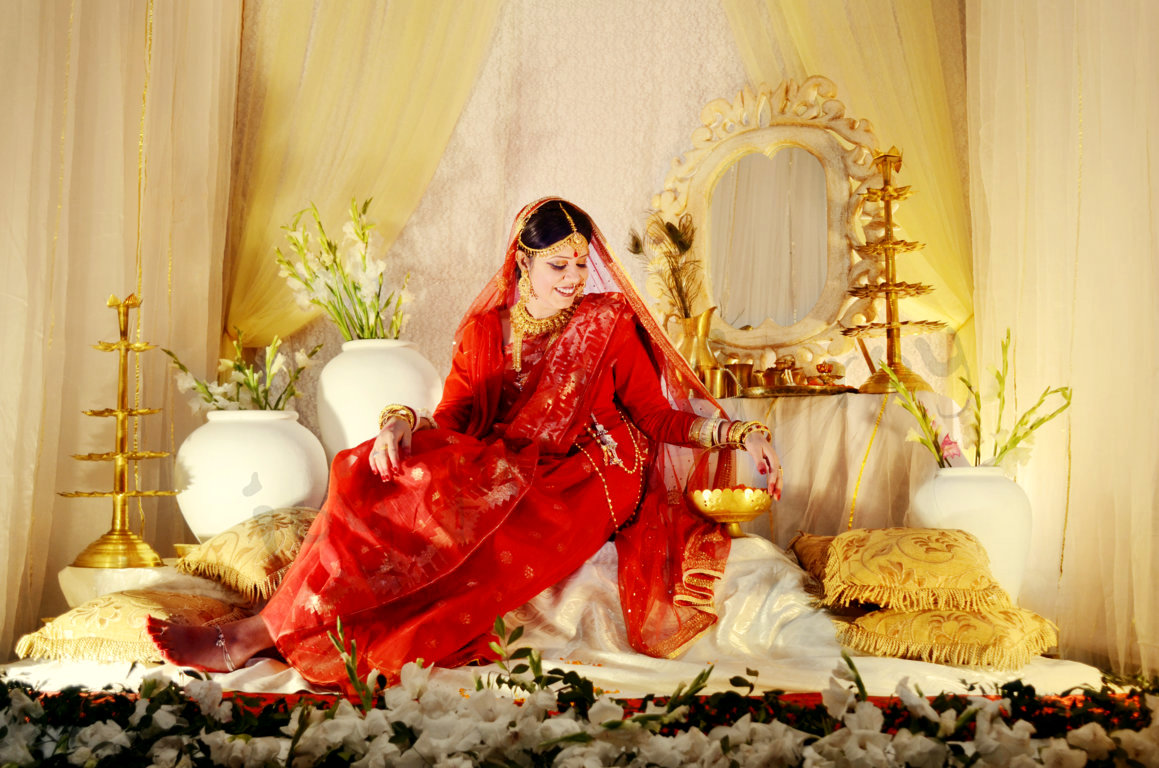
A Bangladeshi woman in Jamdani saree

Bangladesh is home to a diverse range of traditional clothing which is worn by people in their everyday lives. Bangladeshi people have unique clothing preferences. Bangladeshi men traditionally wear a kurta, often called a panjabi, on religious and cultural occasions. They may also be seen wearing a shirt unique to Bangladesh called fotua. Fotua is also available in various styles for women. Bangladeshi men wear lungi as casual wear (in rural areas). Due to the British influence during colonization, shirt-pant and suits are also very common. Bangladeshi women traditionally wear shari and young females are also often seen in shalwar kameez. It is worn during festive occasions, celebrations and weddings. It is also worn as a formal attire by women in the workplaces while shalwar kameez is worn by women doing more practical jobs. In urban areas, women can also be seen wearing western clothes. Sharis come in many different materials: silk sharis, georgette sharis, or designer sharis, each particular fabric contributes to representing the culture overall. Weaving these unique fabric for these Sharis is a traditional art in Bangladesh. Bangladeshi women also wear lehengas especially events like weddings and festive occasions.

== See also ==
- Culture of Dhaka
- Bengali culture
- Indo-Persian culture
- Islamic culture
- Culture of South Asia
- Bengali Muslims
- Bengalis
- Ethnic minorities in Bangladesh
- Bangladeshi society
- Religion in Bangladesh
- Secularism in Bangladesh
- Islam in Bangladesh
- Mangal Shobhajatra
- Pohela Baishakh
- Bishwa Ijtema
- Eid Al Fitr
- Durga Puja in Bangladesh
- Valentine's Day in Bangladesh
- Ghosts in Bengali culture
- Bengali literature
- Culture of Asia
- List of museums in Bangladesh
- Textile arts of Bangladesh
- Pottery of Bangladesh
- List of Intangible Cultural Heritage of Bangladesh
- List of World Heritage Sites in Bangladesh
