= Pottery of Bangladesh =

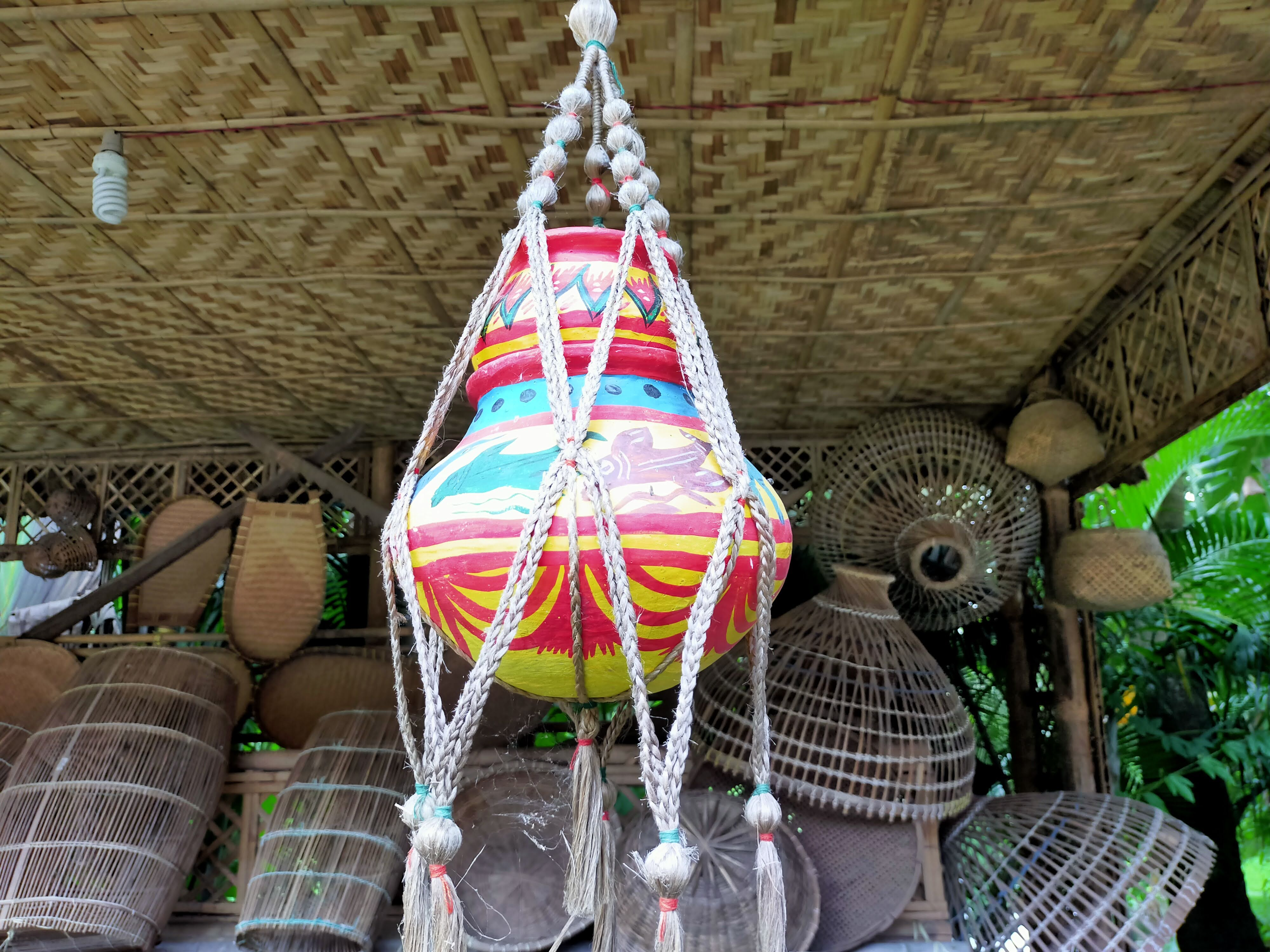
Bangladeshi Handicrafts in a stall in museum

Pottery has been one of the most significant forms of art in Bangladeshi art. It is the traditional craft of shaping clay into functional or decorative objects, such as pots, vessels, sculptures, and terracotta items. It is a long-standing art form in the region, deeply tied to Bangladesh’s culture and rural life.

== Origin ==
The origins of the erliest forms of pottery in the region dates back to the Mohenjo-daro and Harappa civilizations. The Bengal gangetic delta was abundant in alluvial clay deposits which became the foundation of the early earthware. Archaeological excavations at Mahasthangarh in Bogra have revealed a substantial collection of earthenware objects dating back to around 300 BC. These include utilitarian pots, storage jars, bowls, and fragments of Black-and-Red Ware, which served as an established ceramic industry during the early historic period. Pottery was particularly practiced amongst the hereditary Kumar and Pal Hindu caste groups.The findings from Mahasthangarh, along with discoveries from sites such as Paharpur and Mainamati showcased the earliest forms of the craft used within everyday needs and decorative purposes.

During the medieval period, the Bengal Sultanate significantly expanded its maritime trade, connecting Bengal with China, Southeast Asia, and the Islamic world which brought various cultural and artistic influences in the region. Chinese porcelain and other ceramic goods were imported in large quantities, exposing local potters to new styles, glazes, and techniques. This also influenced other craft industries such as metalwork and textiles, flourished under this exchange, adopting motifs, geometric patterns, and manufacturing processes from Persian and Chinese art.

During the Mughal period, Rayerbazaar emerged and flourished as one of the major pottery hubs Bengal region. Due to its close proximity to Buriganga and Turag rivers, Red clay was found in abundance. The area was reported as having a high concentration of potter families, with approximately 750 potter families in the mid-20th century. The artisans of Rayerbazaar crafted a wide variety of earthenware, including flower tubs, jars, “sara” (plates), jugs, cauldrons, and decorative clay figurines. They operated within a traditional economic system, organized through local guilds: wholesalers would bring boats to purchase products directly, while brokers managed transactions, inventory, and shipments. However, with the advent of colonization and the introduction of plastic and aluminum alternatives, the traditional red clay pottery industry sharply declined with few families still maintaining its heritage.

Potters were popularised during the zamindars. They used to be patronised for making statues of goddesses, plates and other aesthetical items. Sometimes they were made to sculpt statues of the zamindar themselves. But after the end of the zamindar, they started making everyday household items for sale in the local markets to earn a living. They also made the wheels of the popular transportation system Gorur Gari (a lightweight cart pulled by male cows).

== Pottery villages ==
The Dhamrai pottery industry is the most renowned village for pottery in Bangladesh. There are several pottery villages in Dhamrai, such as Kagojipara, Shimulia Pal para, Notun bondor, etc. These villages are well known for their pottery expertise and the Pal family residence for generations. Most of the artisans work here as freelancers. They make the product and sell it in the local market.

== Terracotta ==
Terracotta indicates the clay after pottery has been burned by fire and heated. It is a popular form of making sculptures via pottery. It demanded very little, as the products made of clay could be baked cake under the sun for one year or burned to give them an orange-clay color and greatly improve the durability. Most of the artisans opted for terracotta as it was easier and the cheaper option. This tradition could also be traced back to the Mahenjodarro and Harappa civilisations.
