= Punjabi clothing =

Clothing style associated with people of the Punjab region

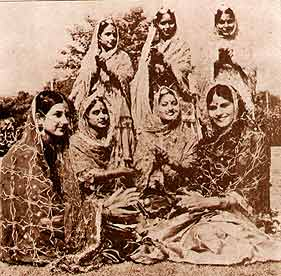
Punjabi women in traditional wedding clothes performing boliyan

In the Punjab region, people wore cotton clothing. Both men and women wore knee-length tops. A scarf was worn over the tops which would be draped over the left shoulder and under the right. A large sheet would be further draped over one shoulder which would hang loose towards the knees. Both male and female wore a dhoti or lungi around the waist. Modern Indian Punjabi dress has retained the dhoti, but over its long history has added other forms of dress.

The Punjab region had a flourishing industry in cotton during the 19th and early 20th centuries, when various kinds of coarse cotton clothes. This cotton industry added to the richness of Punjabi clothing which exhibits Punjab's rich and vibrant culture in its dresses. Various types of dresses are worn based on different Punjabi festivals, local events and ceremonies.

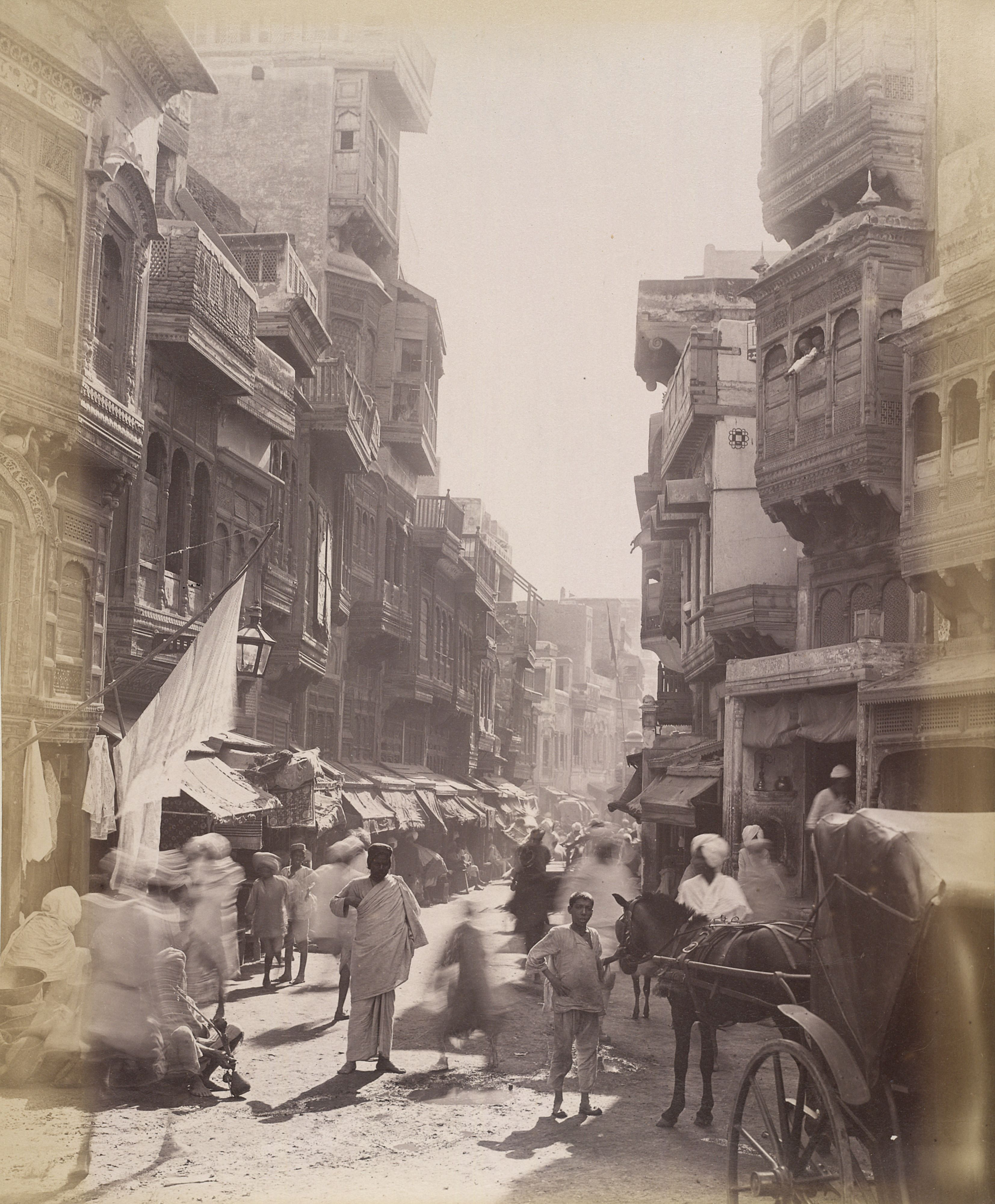
Punjabi clothing of Lahore, 1890s

Along with different traditional dresses special types of ornaments are also very common.

== Suthan ==
The use of the Suthan in the Punjab region also called Suthana in Punjabi is a survival of the ancient Svasthana. Svasthana referred to a lower garment which can be described as a type of trousers. The Svasthana was in use amongst the rulers in the Mauryan era (322–185 BCE), amongst the ruling classes in North India during the Kushan Empire between the 1st and 3rd centuries C.E, during the Gupta Empire between 4th and 6th centuries C.E. and during Emperor Harsha's rule during the 7th century C.E.

The Punjabi suthan is a direct variation of the svasthana which can either be loose to above the ankles and tight around the ankles, or loose to the knees and tight to the ankles. The suthan is a male and female garment but its use is particularly important in the Punjabi suthan suit whereby it is worn by women with a kurti or kurta. It is also a part of the Punjabi ghagra outfit. Other variations include the choga (robe) and suthan combination.

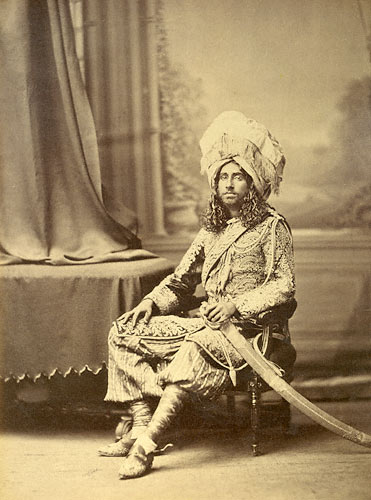
The Nawab Muhammad Bahawal Khan Abbasi V Bahadur (1883–1907) of Bahawalpur State in suthan

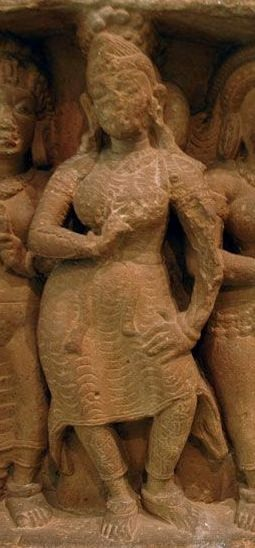
Ancient svasthana and varbana outfit worn during Gupta Empire, the basis of the Punjabi suthan suit

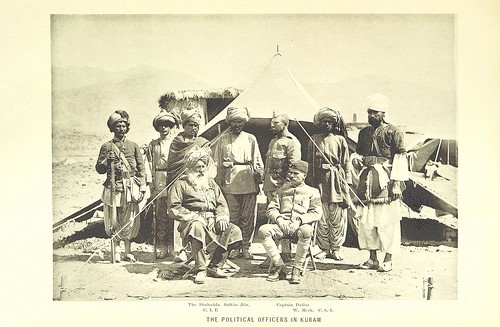
Men in British Punjab army in tight and loose Punjabi suthans 1895

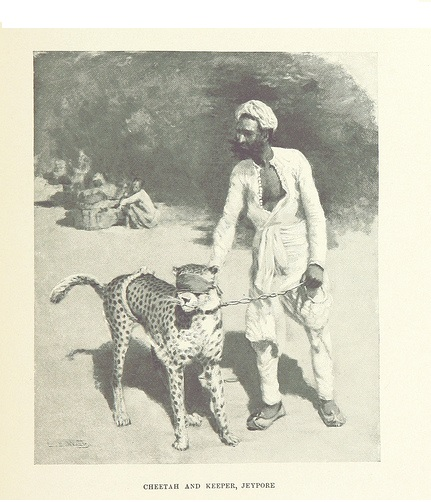
Man in tight Punjabi suthan. 1896

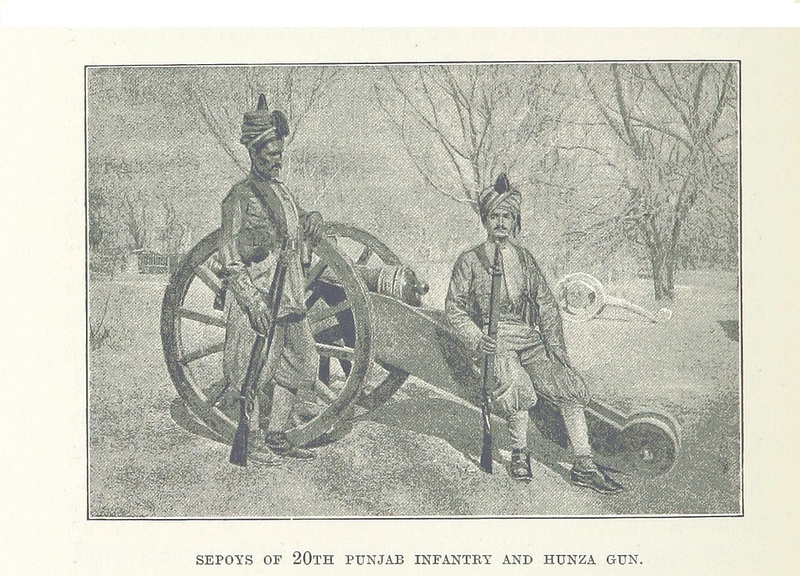
1893. Men in Punjabi tight from knees suthan

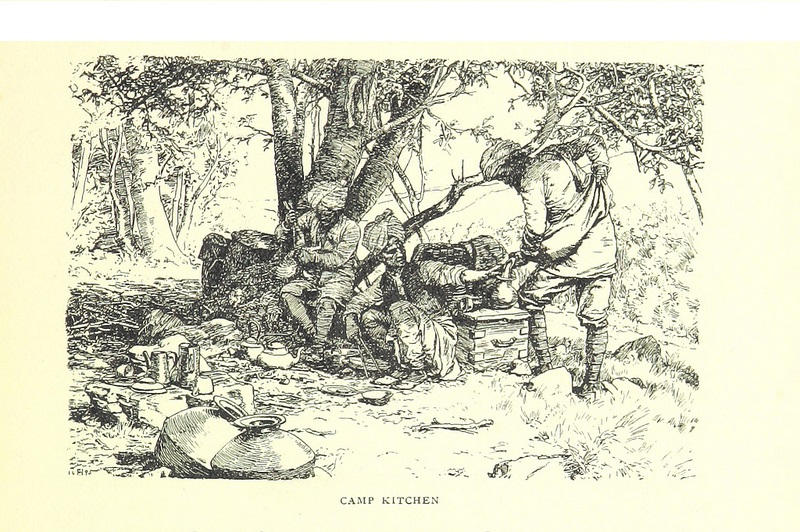
Men of the British Punjab army in Punjabi churidar suthans 1895 Punjab Hills

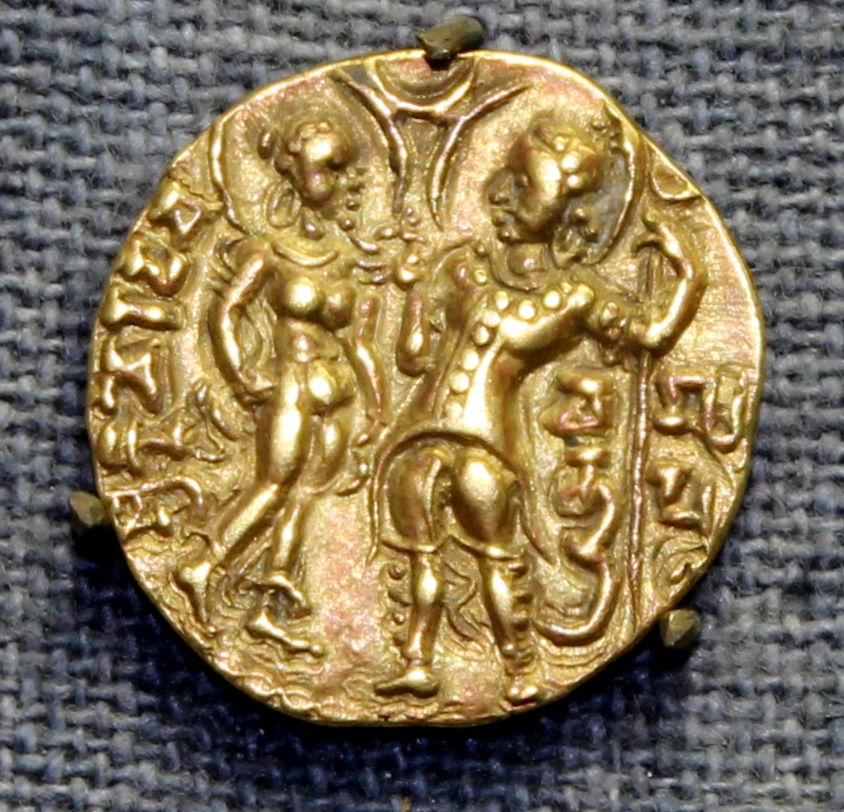
Gupta coin depicting svasthana and angrakshaka with long jutas.
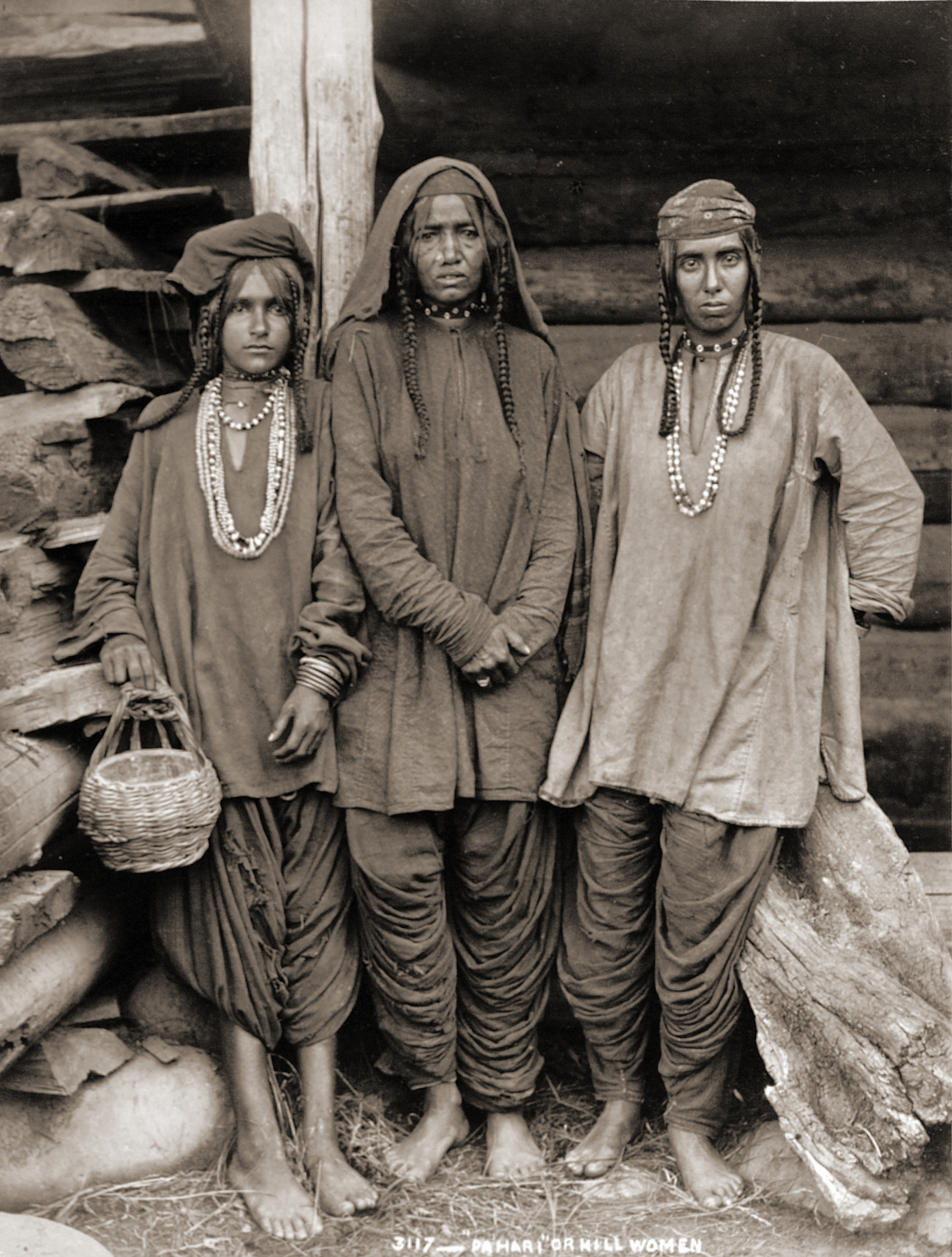
Women in Punjabi suthan 1890

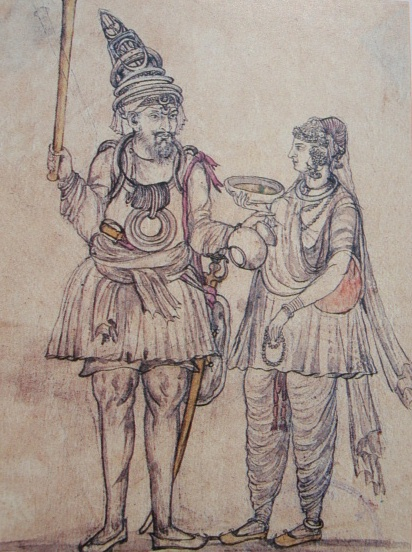
19th Century Punjabi suthan suit worn by the lady on the right

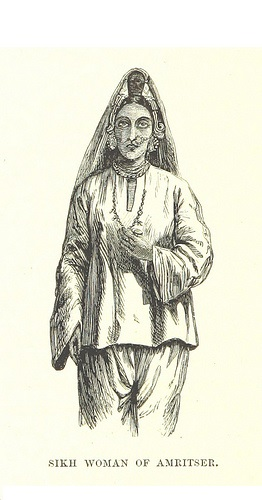
Punjabi woman in Punjabi suthan and short kurta 1874

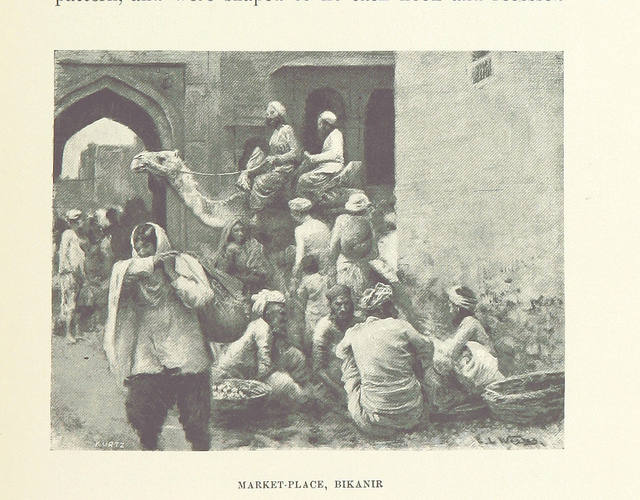
Woman on right in loose Punjabi suthan suit

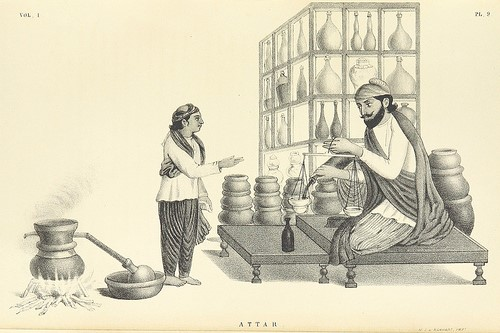
A Punjabi woman in Kurti and suthan visiting the Attar, the pharmacist. 1852

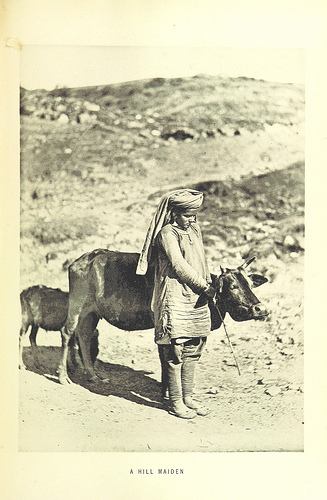
Punjab Hills 1895. Kulu woman in Punjabi churidar suthan. Himachal Pradesh.

== Kurta ==
The kurta with its side slits in the Punjabi kurta can be traced to the 11th century C.E.

The straight-cut traditional kurta is known as a panjabi in Bangladesh, West Bengal and Assam. The traditional Punjabi kurta of the Punjab region is wide and falls to the knees and is cut straight. The modern version of the regional kurta is the Mukatsari kurta which originates from Muktsar in Indian Punjab. This modern Punjabi kurta is famous for its slim-fitting cuts and smart fit designs. It is very popular among young politicians.

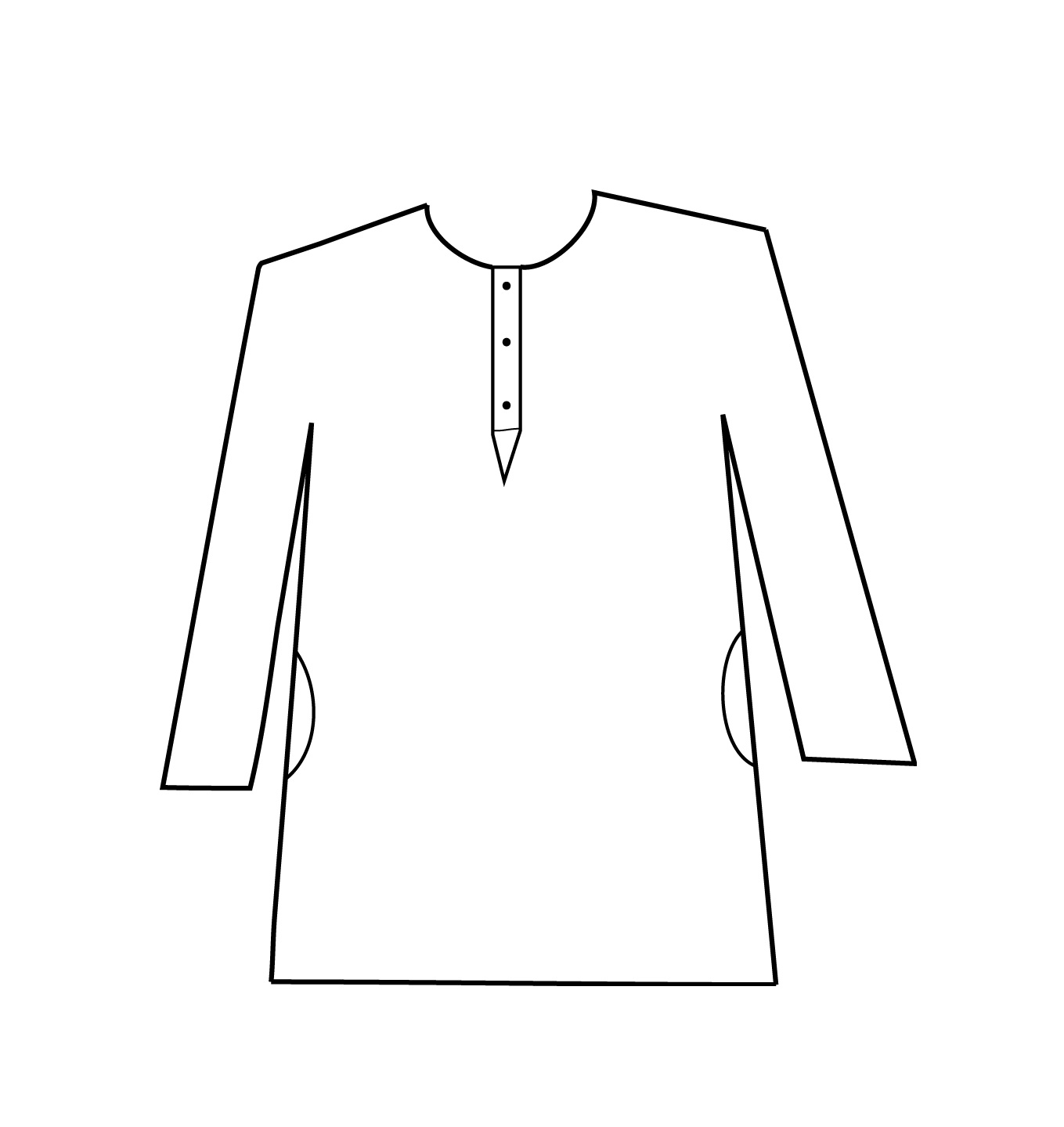
Kurta - Men's

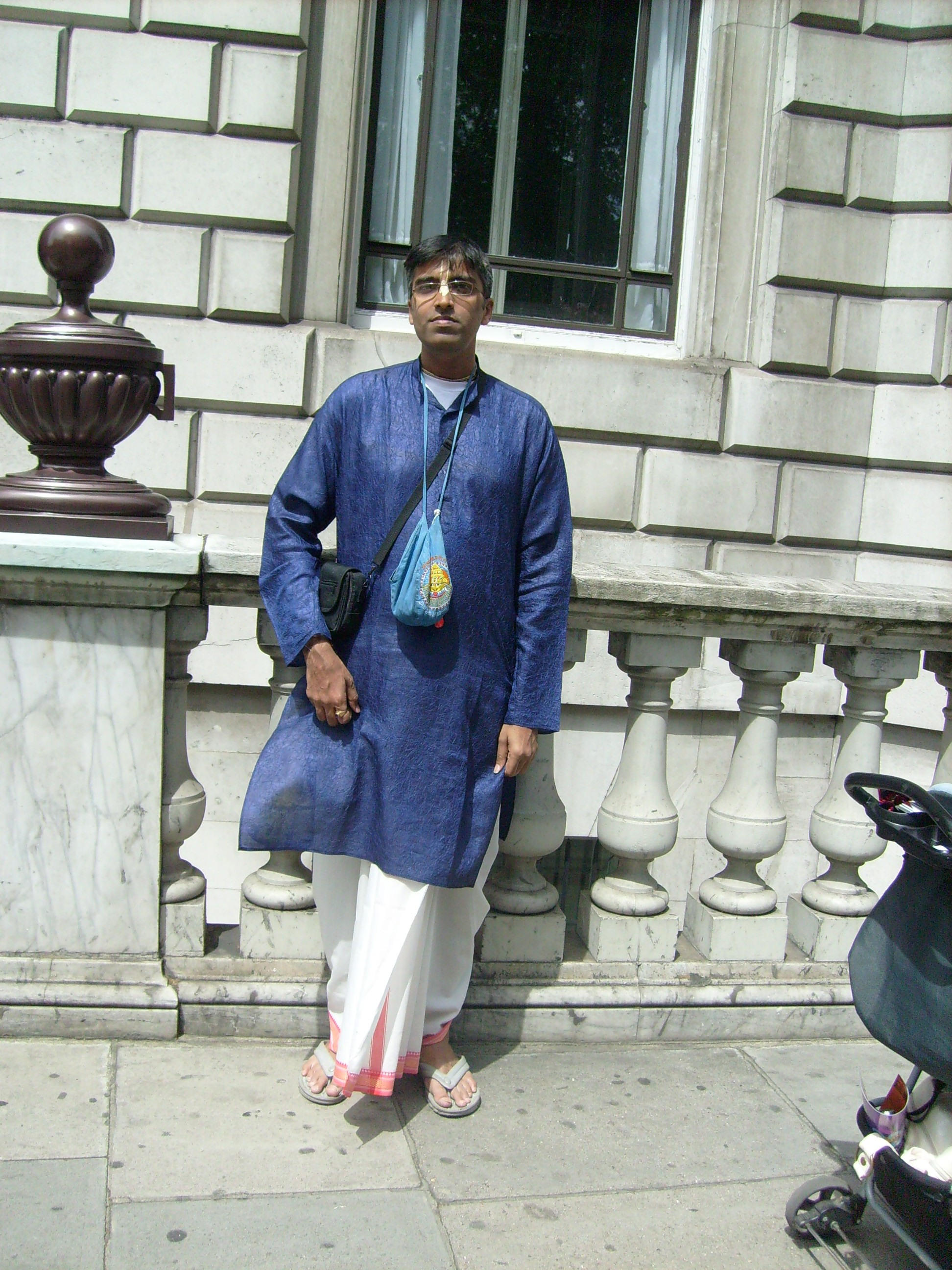
Man in Dhoti Kurta

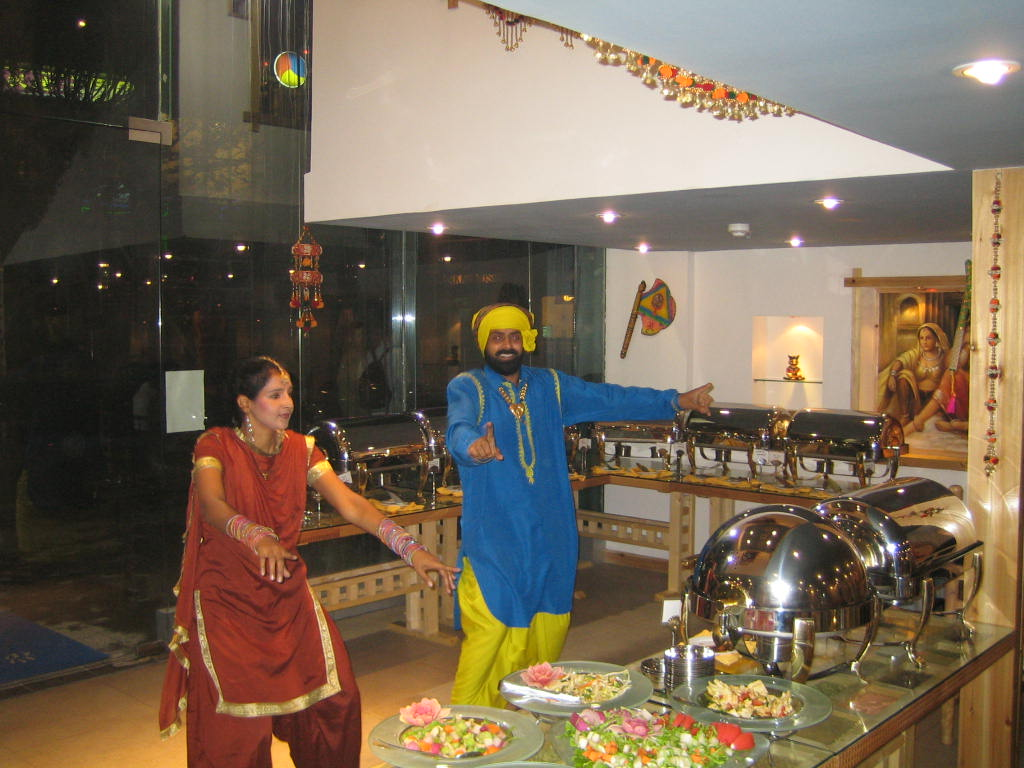
Man in blue kurta

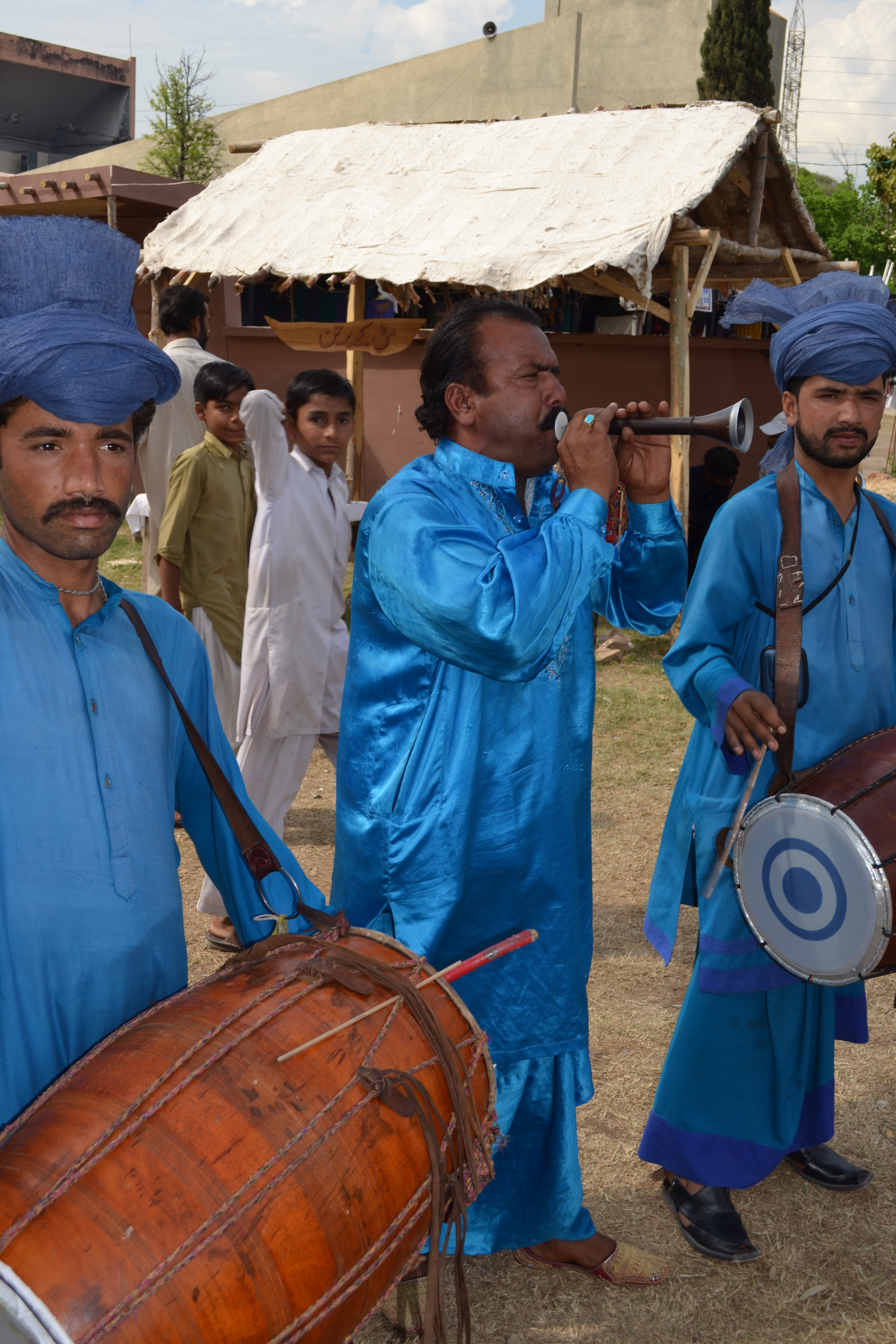
Kurta

=== Multani kurta ===
The Multani kurta is crocheted using Sajarak prints of Multan.

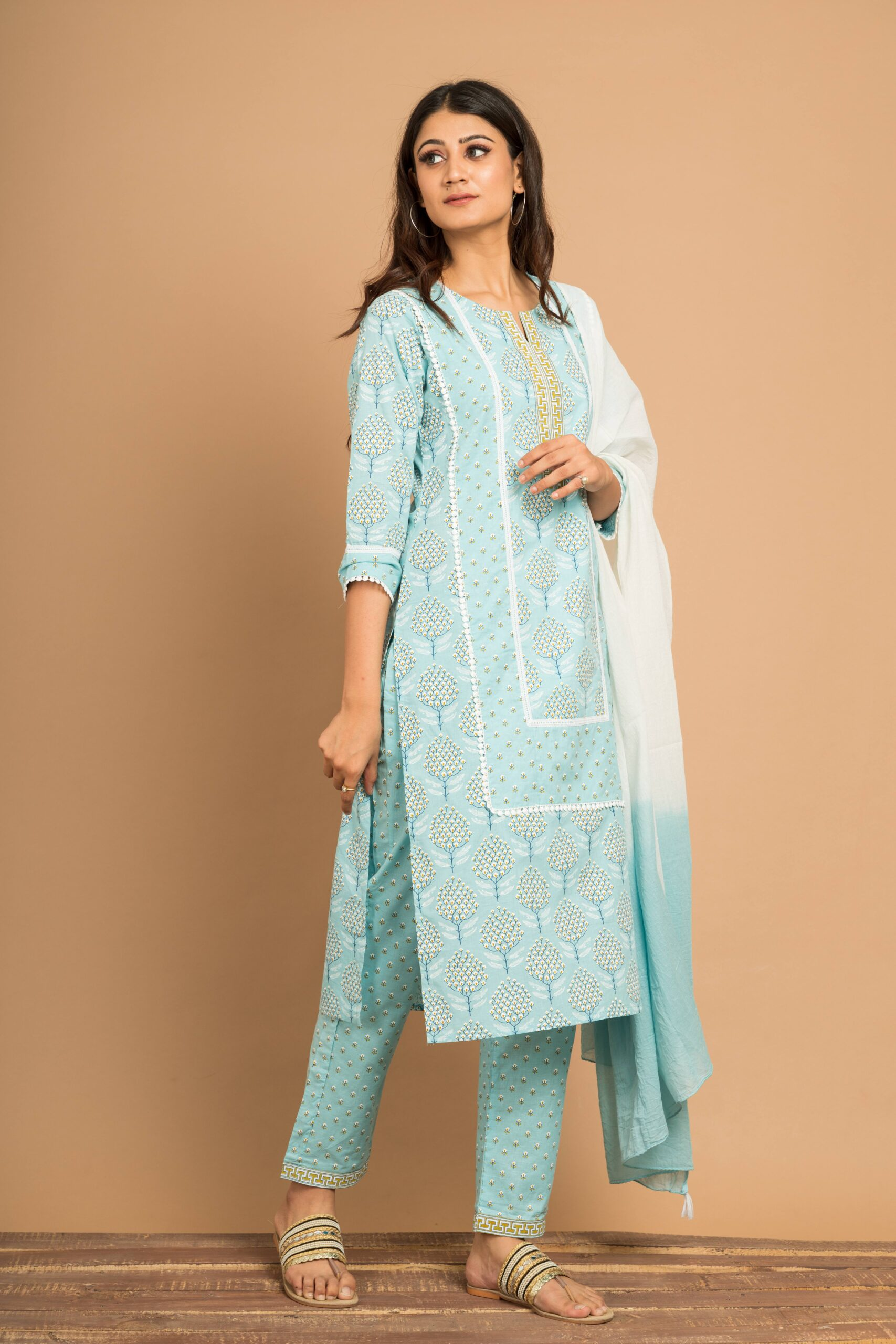

=== Phulkari kurta ===
A Phulkari kurta is embroidered using the Phulkari embroidery of the Punjab region.

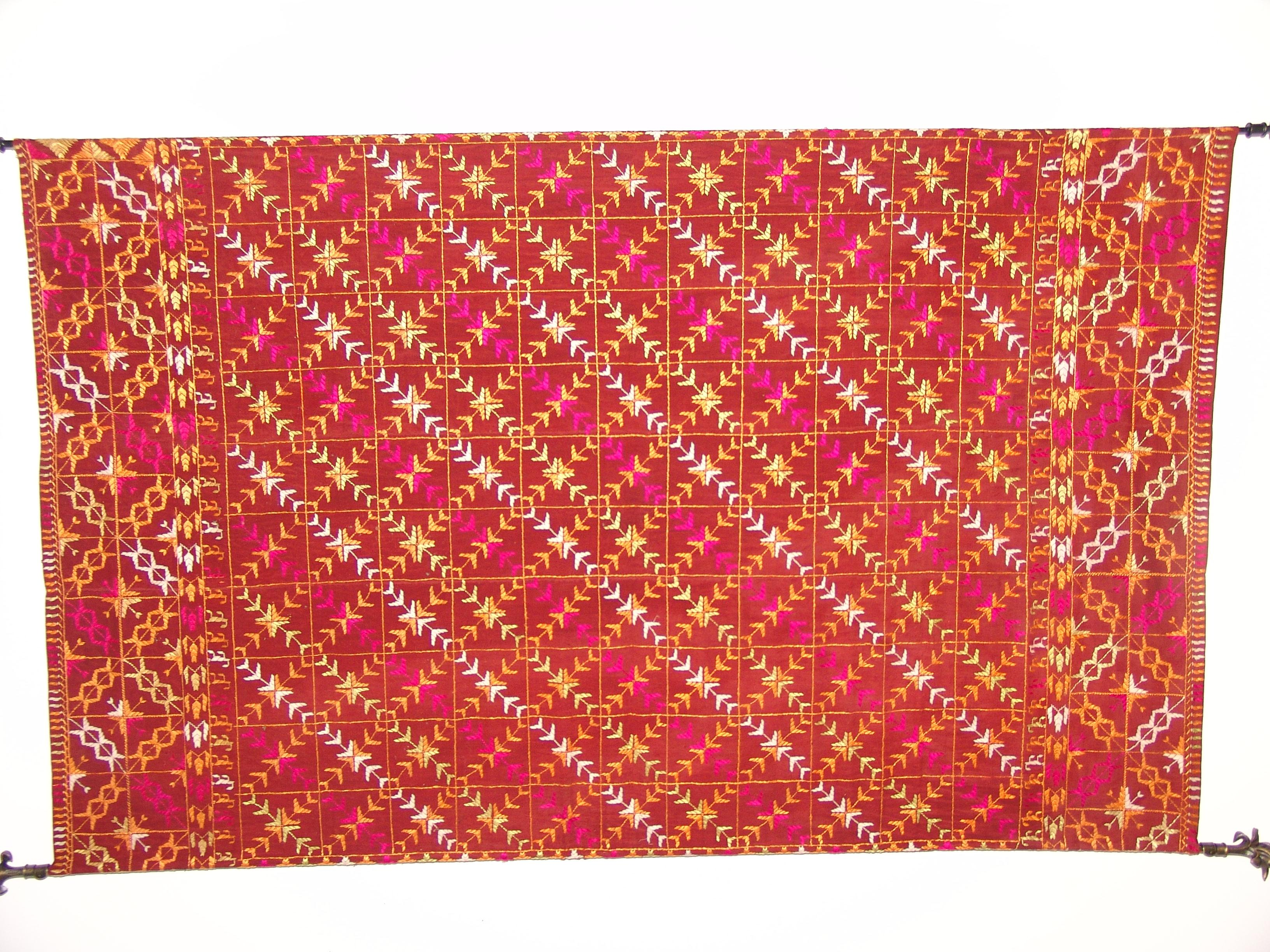
Patiala Phulkari

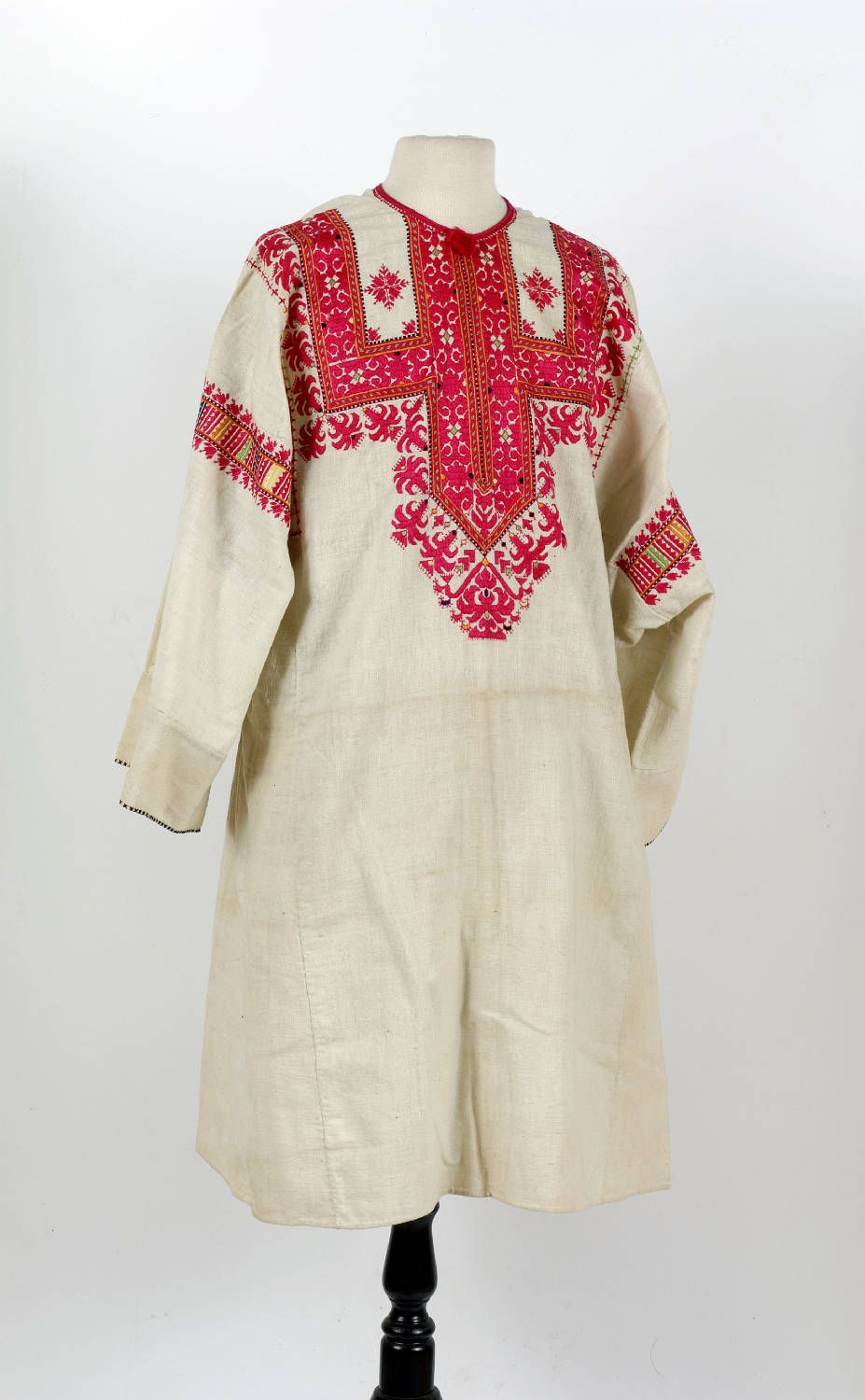
Josephine Powell Collection, voor 1965: Phulkari kurta

=== Bandhani kurta ===
Bandhani tye-dyeing is popular in the Cholistan Desert area of Punjab, Pakistan. Bandhani patterns are used on kurtas.

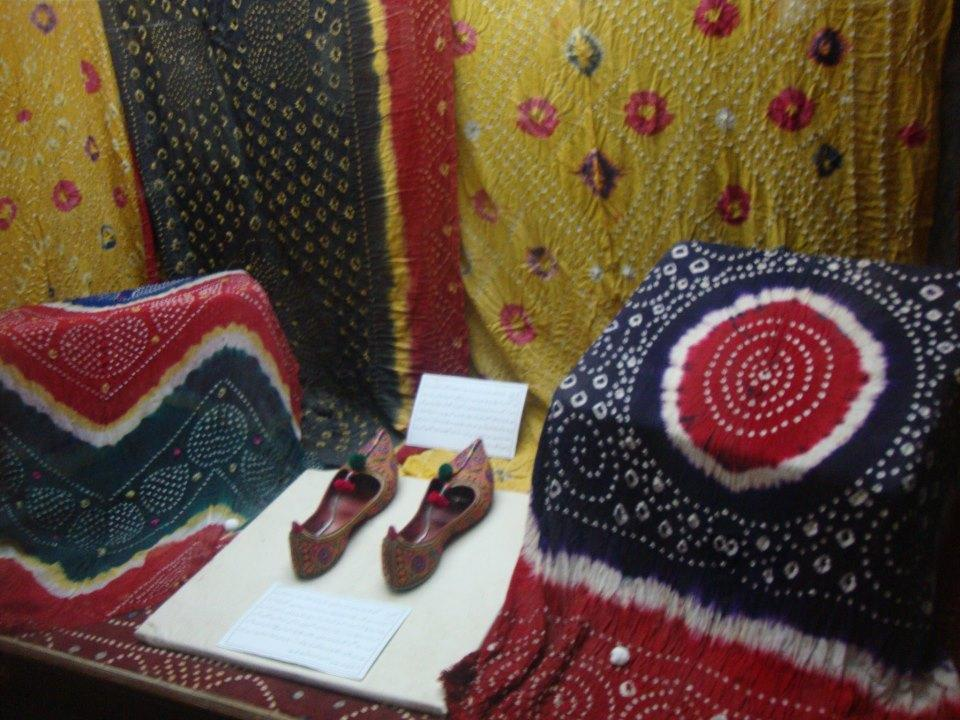
Rohi (Cholistan) woman's bandhani dress Punjab, Pakistan

== Shalwar Kameez ==
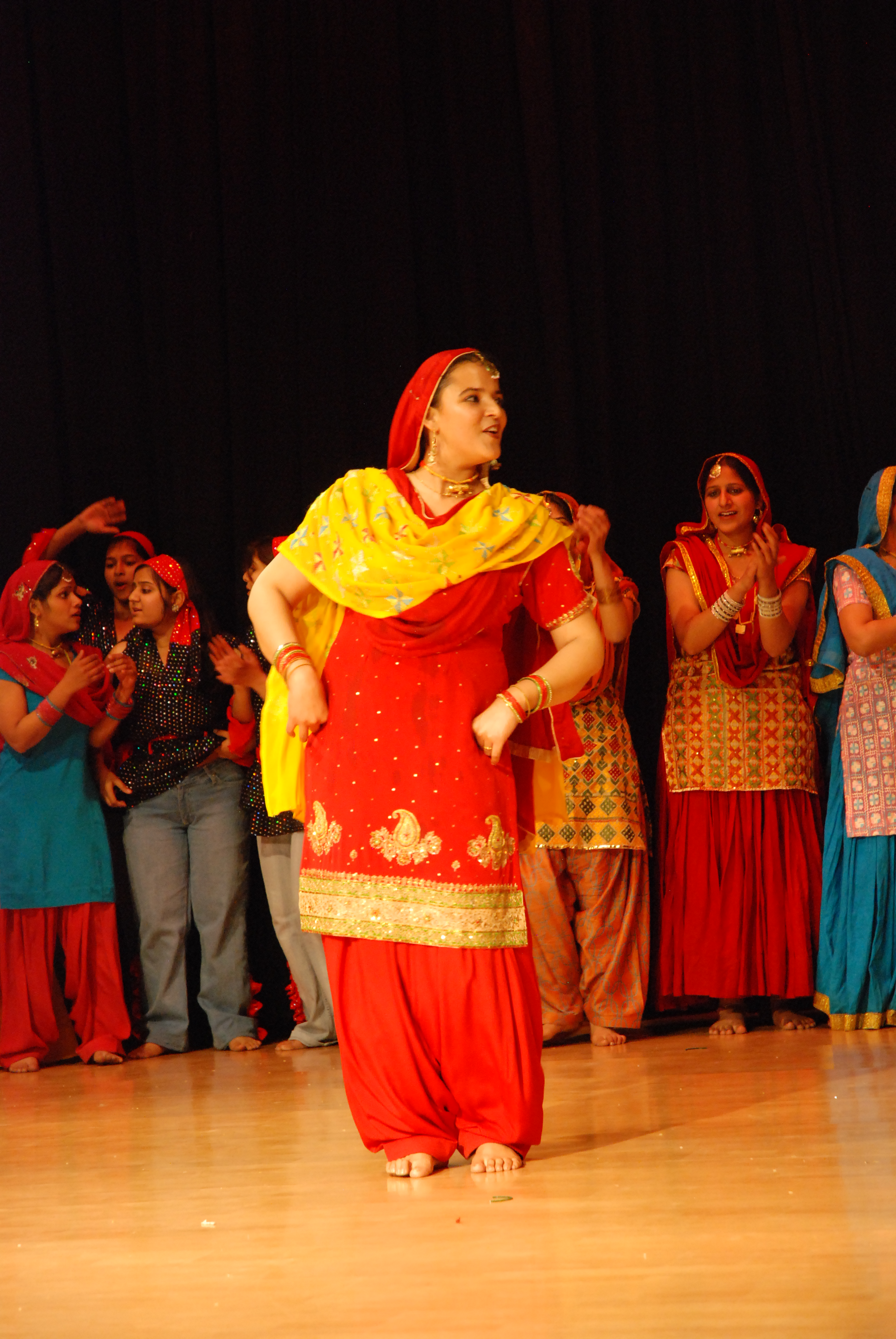
Punjabi traditional Shalwar in India

A Punjabi suit that features two items - a qameez (top), salwar (bottom) is the traditional attire of the Punjabi people. Shalwars are trousers which are atypically wide at the waist but which narrow to a cuffed bottom. They are held up by a drawstring or elastic belt, which causes them to become pleated around the waist. The trousers can be wide and baggy, or they can be cut quite narrow, on the bias. The kameez is a long shirt or tunic. The side seams are left open below the waist-line (the opening known as the chaak (Note: A Dictionary of Urdu, Classical Hindi, and English: chāk derives from the Persian "چاك ćāk, Fissure, cleft, rent, slit, a narrow opening (intentionally left in clothes).")), which gives the wearer greater freedom of movement. The kameez is usually cut straight and flat; older kameez use traditional cuts; modern kameez are more likely to have European-inspired set-in sleeves. The combination garment is sometimes called salwar kurta, salwar suit, or Punjabi suit. The shalwar-kameez is a widely-worn, and national dress, of Pakistan. When women wear the shalwar-kameez in some regions, they usually wear a long scarf or shawl called a dupatta around the head or neck. The dupatta is also employed as a form of modesty—although it is made of delicate material, it obscures the upper body's contours by passing over the shoulders. For Muslim women, the dupatta is a less stringent alternative to the chador or burqa (see hijab and purdah); for Sikh and Hindu women, the dupatta is useful when the head must be covered, as in a temple or the presence of elders. Everywhere in South Asia, modern versions of the attire have evolved; the shalwars are worn lower down on the waist, the kameez have shorter length, with higher splits, lower necklines and backlines, and with cropped sleeves or without sleeves.

The Punjabi suit is popular in other regions of the subcontinent, such as Mumbai and Sindh. It is also popular in Afghanistan, where it is called the Punjabi.

== Punjabi tamba and kurta ==
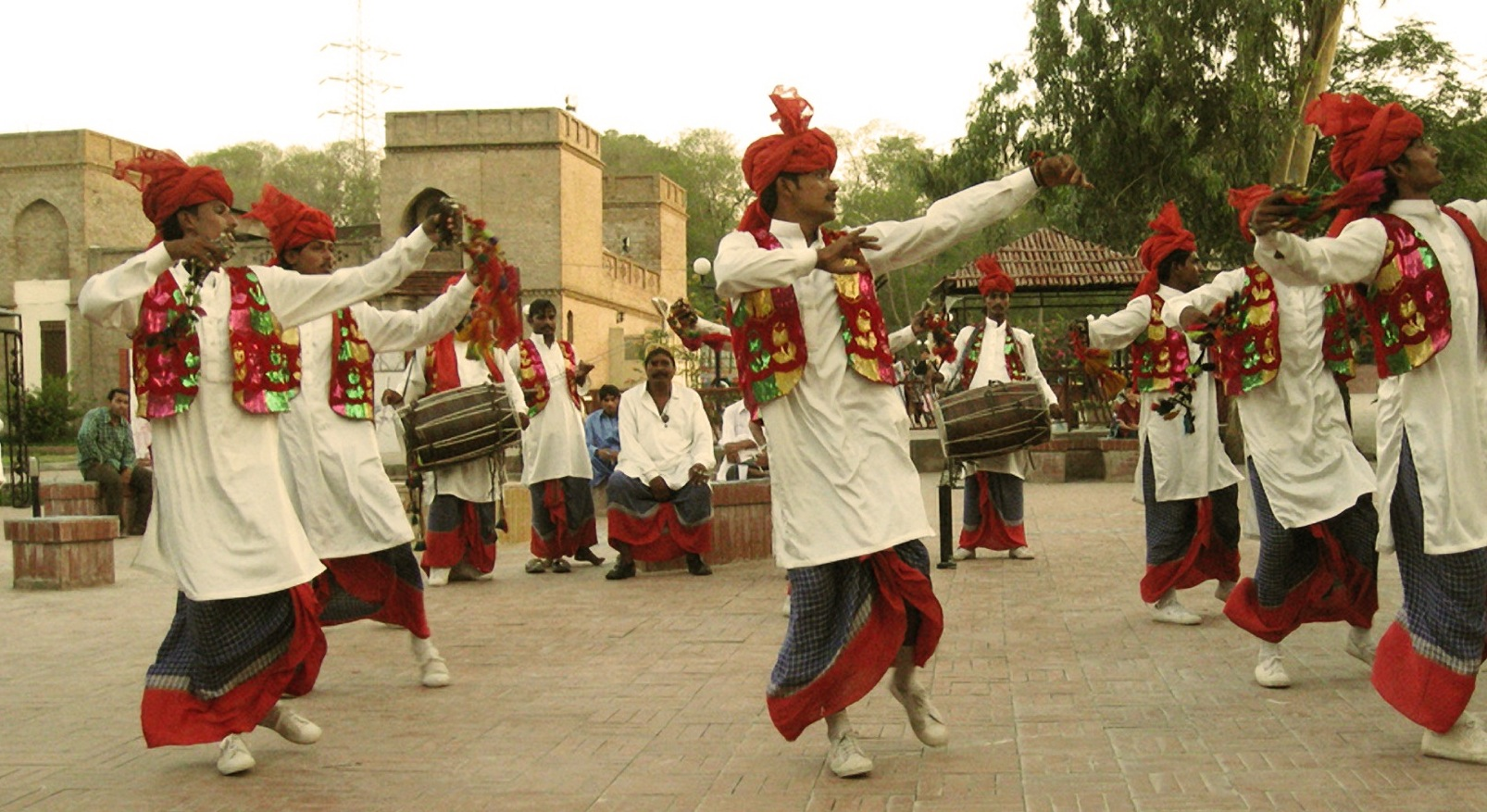
Bhangra Dance performers in Punjab wearing Kurta and Tehmat.

The Punjabi version of the Dhoti is known as tehmat/tamba or laccha. Whereas the tehmat is of one colour and has no border, the laacha has a border and is variegated so that it has more than one colour.

== Kurti ==
In modern usage, a short kurta is referred as the kurti. However, traditionally, the kurti refers to upper garments which sit above the waist without side slits, and are believed to have descended from the tunic of the Shunga period (2nd century B.C.).

In the Punjab region, the kurti is a short cotton coat. Another style of Punjabi kurti is a short version of the anga (robe). The kurti can be worn by men but women wear it along with the Punjabi ghagra or suthan.

== Pothohari suit ==
Another style of the Punjabi suit is the use of the shalwar which hails from the Pothohar region of Punjab, Pakistan and is known as the Pothohari shalwar. The Pothohari shalwar retains the wideness of the older Punjabi suthan and also has some folds. The kameez is also wide. The head scarf is traditionally large, similar to the chador or Phulkari that was used throughout the plains of the Punjab region.

== Chola ==
The Sikh Chola is traditional dress worn by Sikhs. It is a martial attire which gives freedom of movement to a Sikh warrior. There are preserved chola relics and artefacts that were worn by the Sikh Gurus. A particular Khilka-type Chola believed to have belonged to Guru Nanak has garnered considerable attention and study. A preserved chola of Guru Hargobind linked to the tale of his release from Gwalior Fort with fifty-two fellow prisoners is believed to be preserved at Ghudani Kalan village in Amritsar district of Punjab, India.

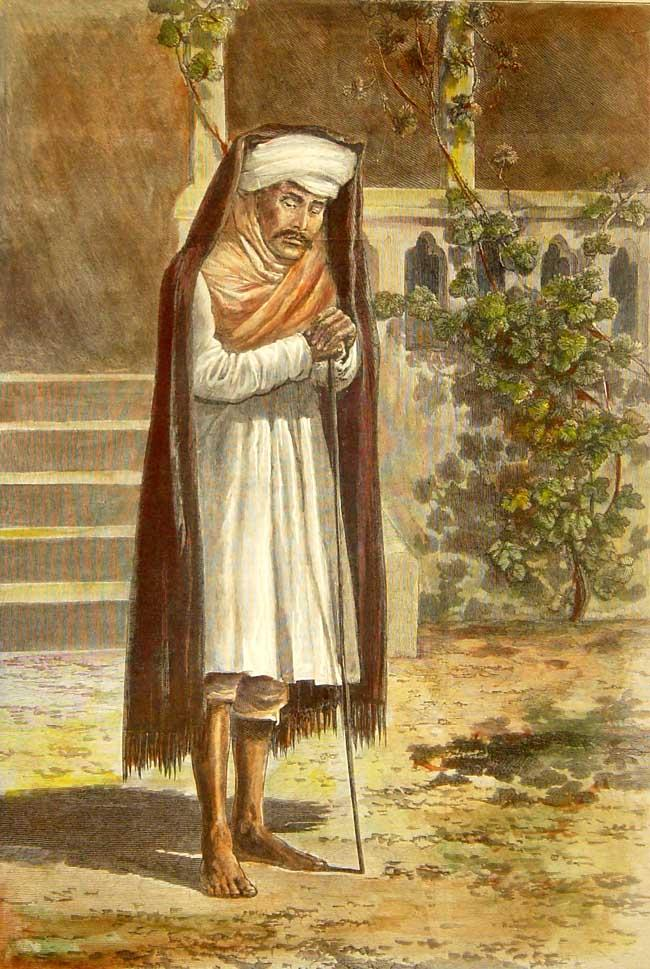
Nightwatchman 1878. man in Punjabi chola and Punjabi ghutanna pajama

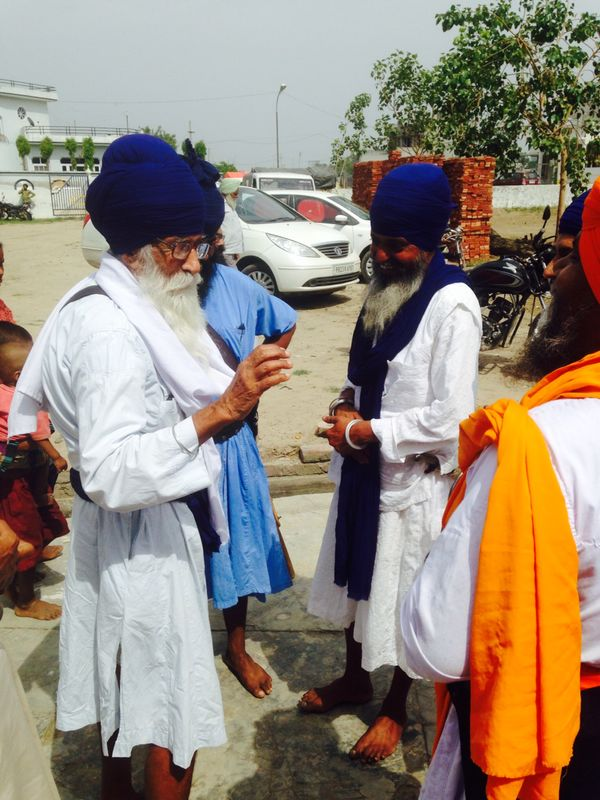
Men wearing modern chola

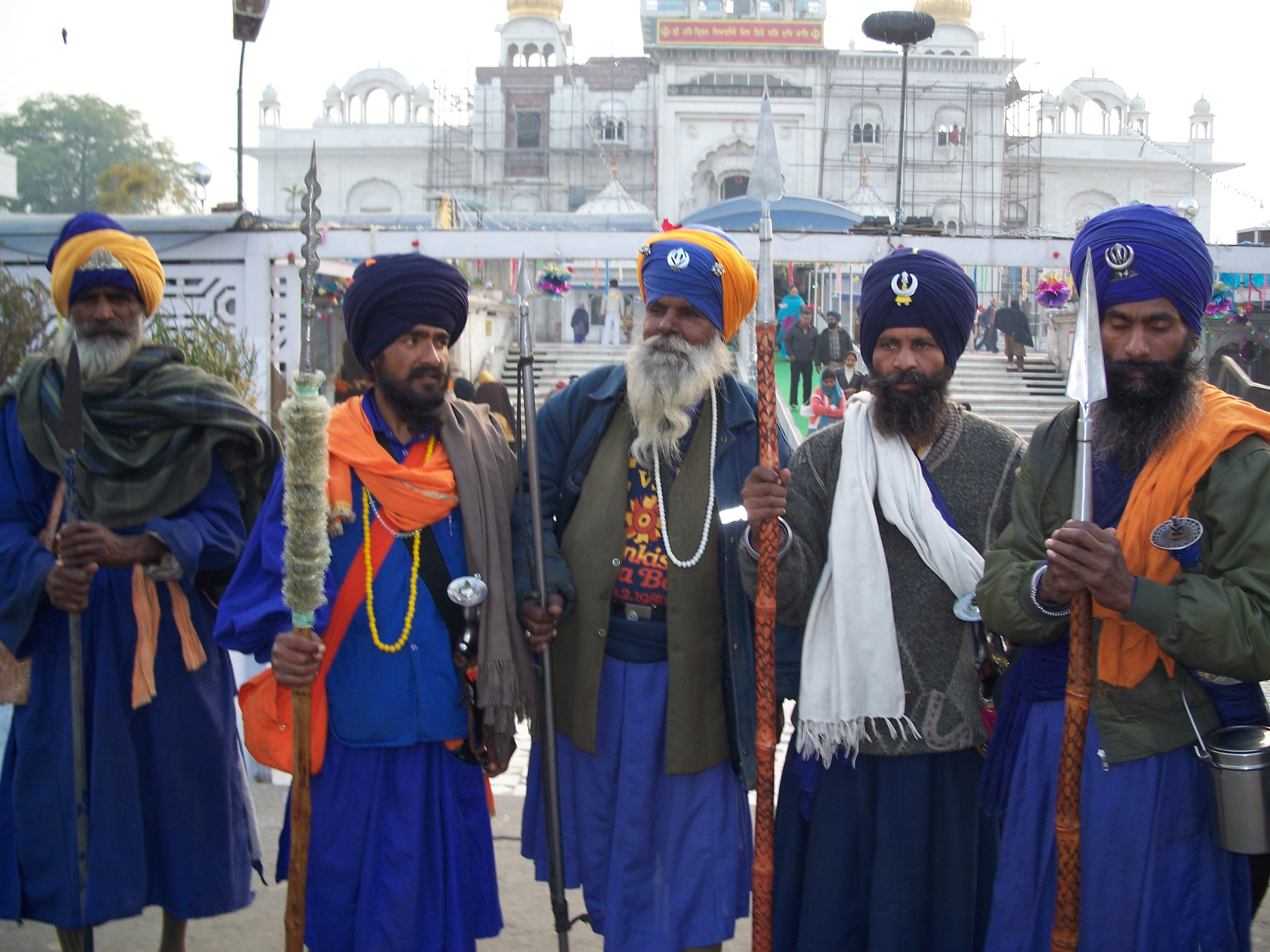
Group of nihangs in cholas

== Punjabi ghagra ==
The Punjabi ghagra was the traditional apparel for women before the advent of the Punjabi suit. In modern times, the ghagra is worn by women in parts of Haryana, rural parts of southwestern part of Punjab, parts of Himachal Pradesh and during performances of Giddha in East Punjab.

The ghagra has its origin in the candataka, which had become a popular garment in the Gupta period. The candataka was a men's half trousers which eventually developed into the ghagra. The intermediate formation has been described as a shirt like dress for men and women from the neck to the thighs. Candataka continued as a popular female dress in the seventh century.

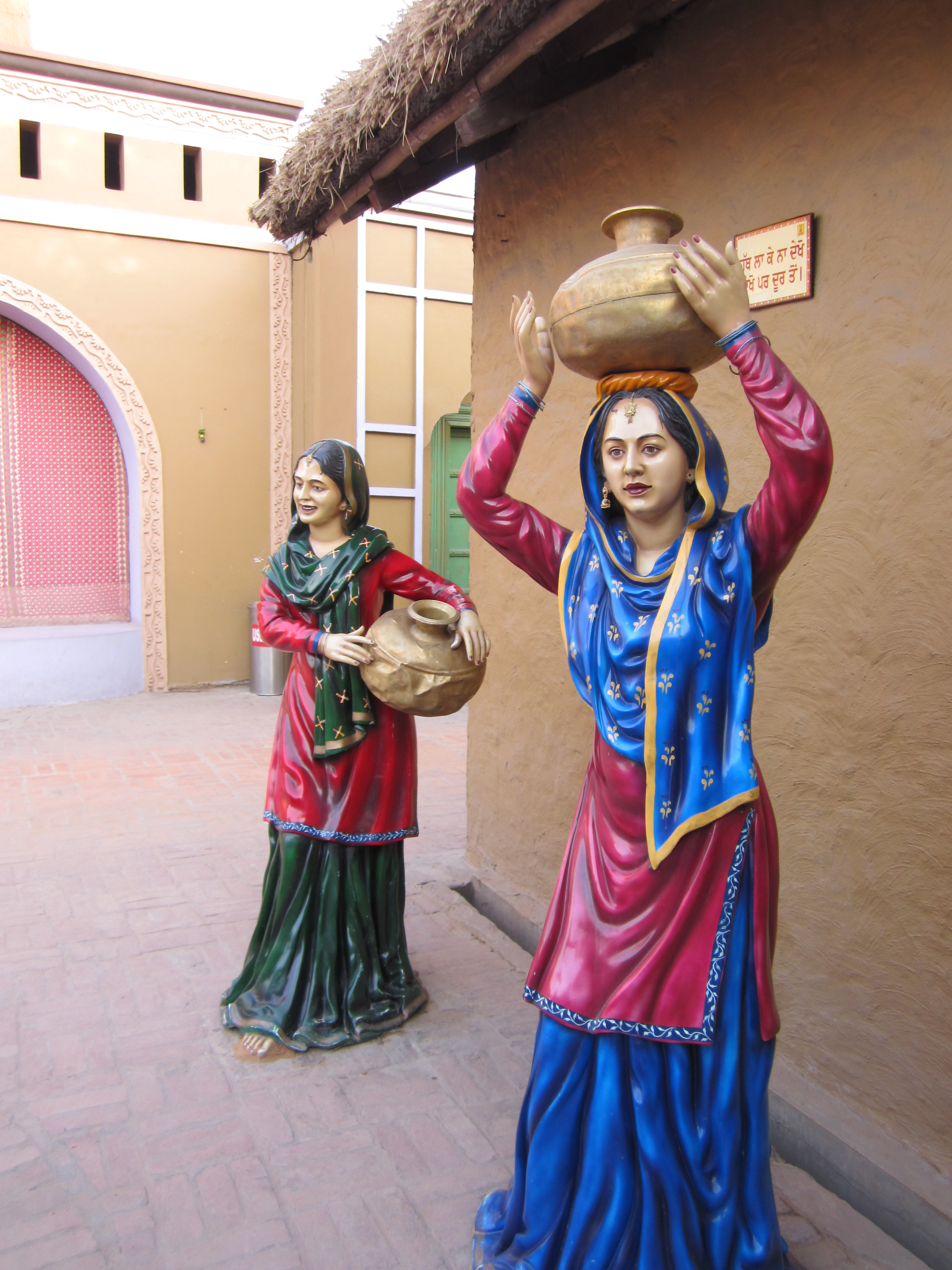
Statutes of women in kurta

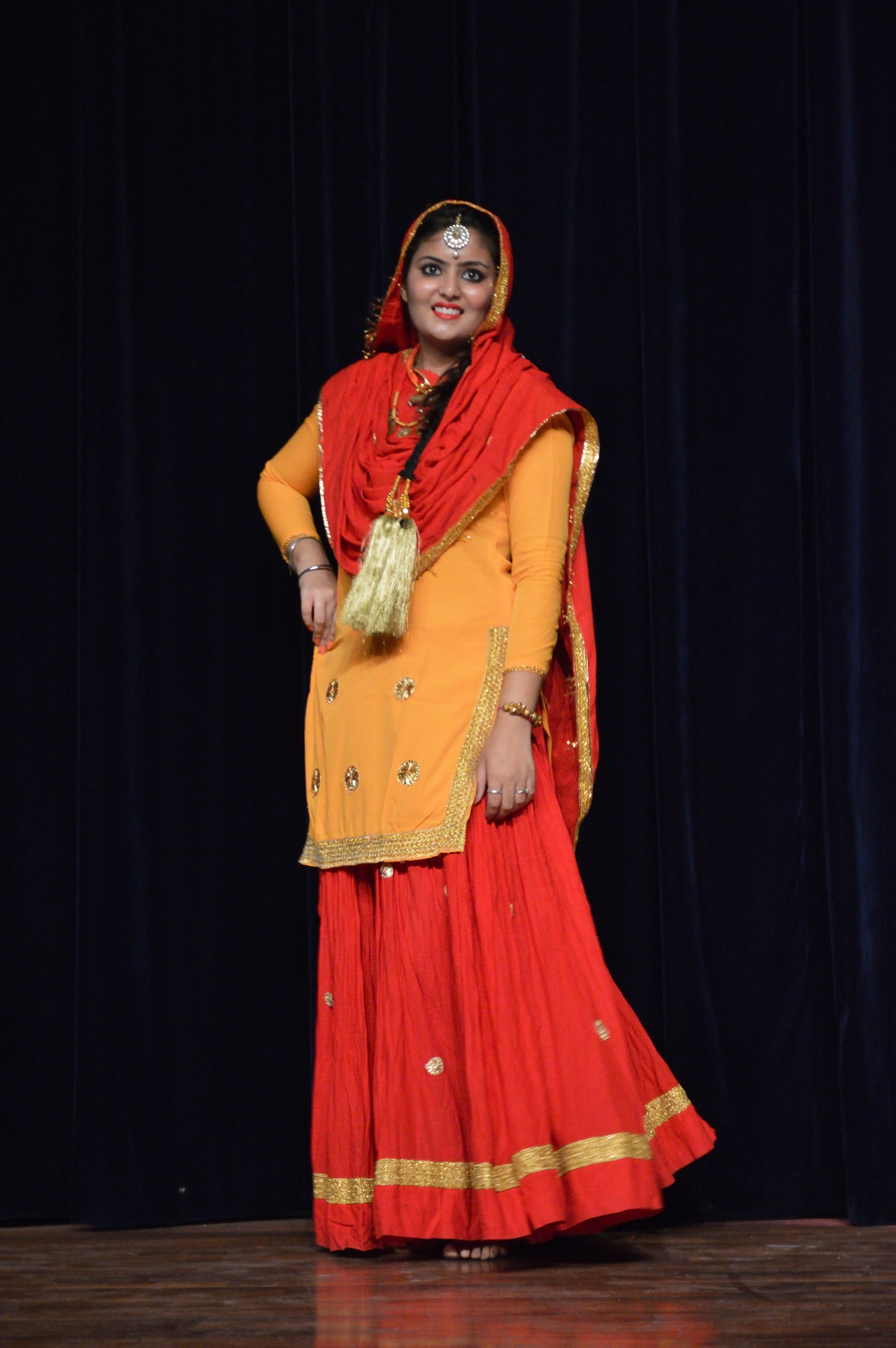
Punjabi ghagra

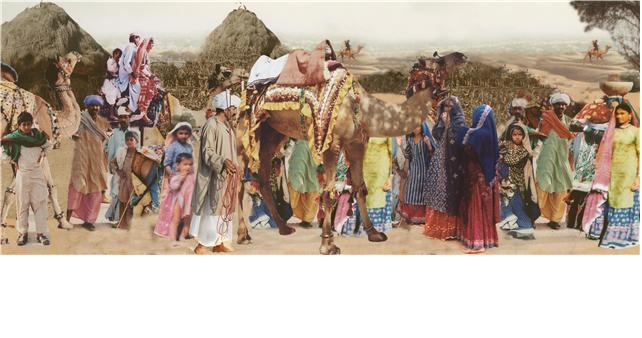
Cholistan desert tradition women wearing ghagra

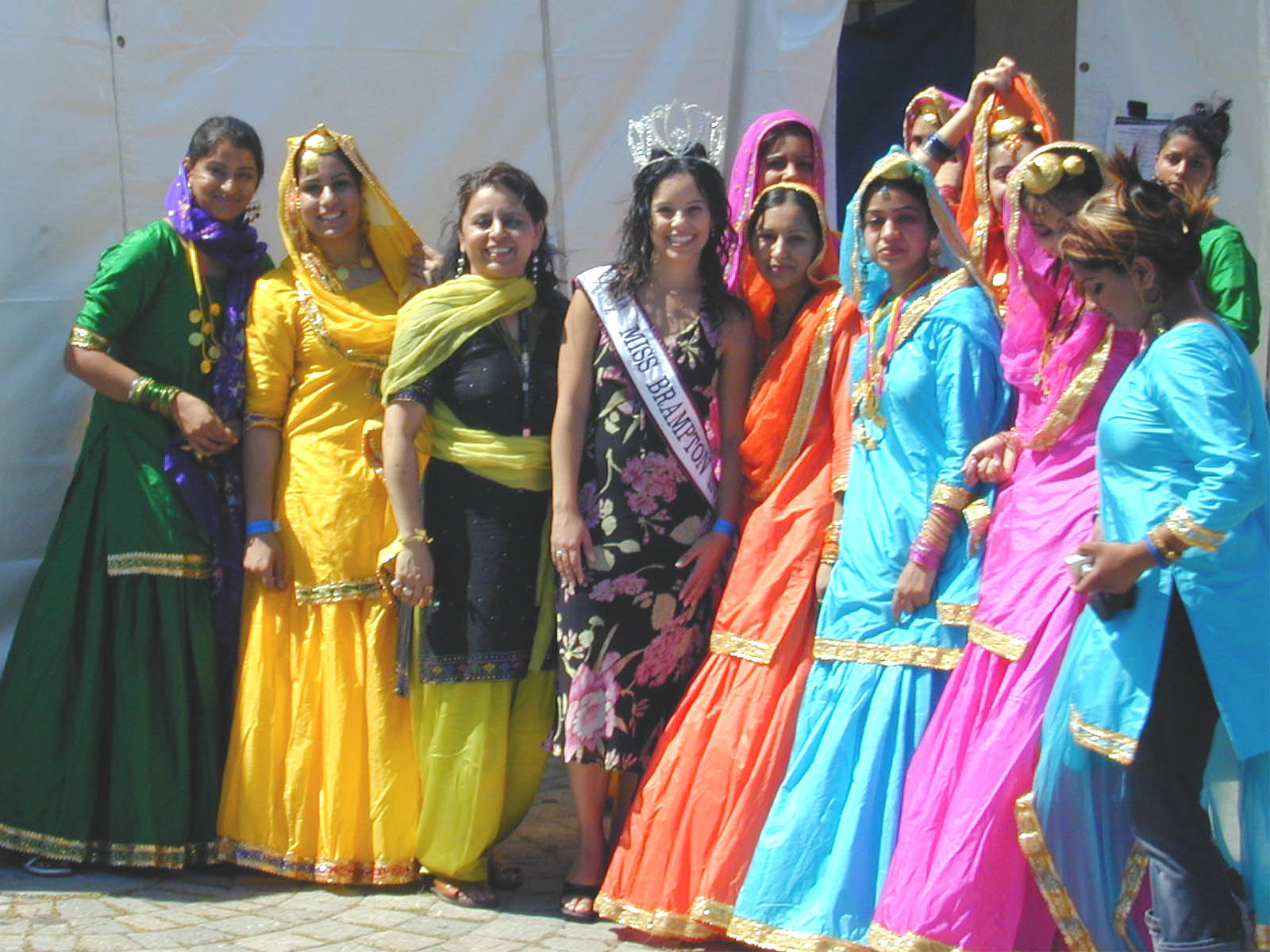
Punjabi kurta and lehenga

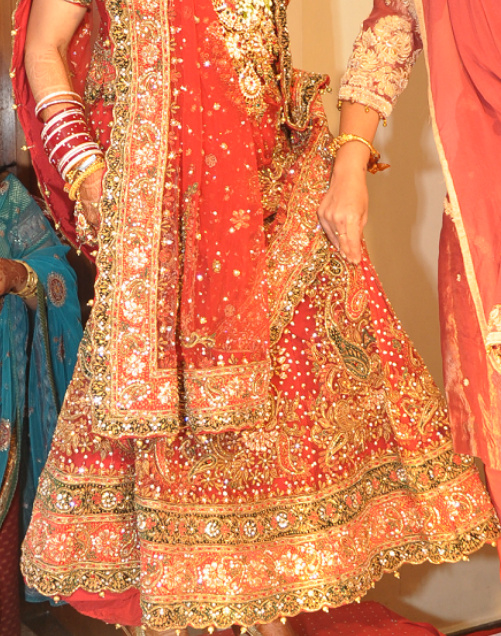
Bridal lehenga with Gota Embroidery

== Punjabi Juti ==
The Punjabi Jutti is the Punjabi version of the shoe. Local styles include designs from Patiala, the Pothohari shoe with sharp pointed toes, and the Derawali shoe with silk embroidery and round tipped.

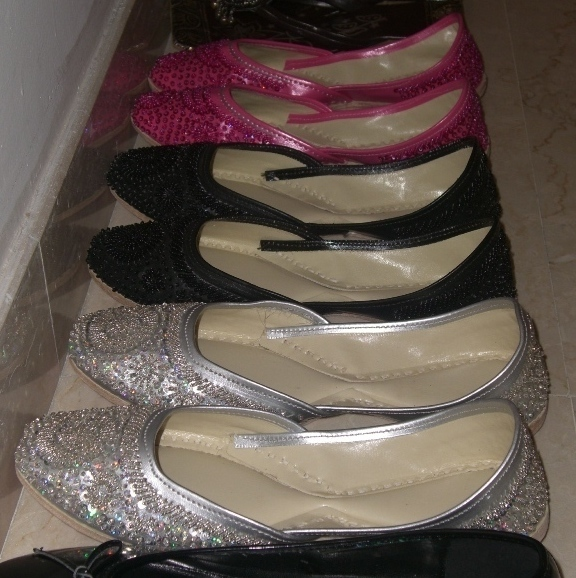
Jutti shoes

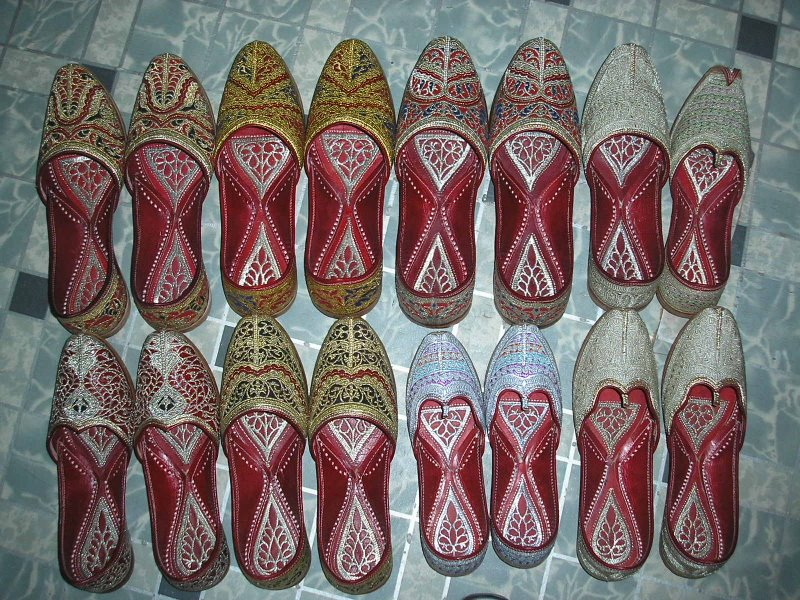
Fazilka jutti

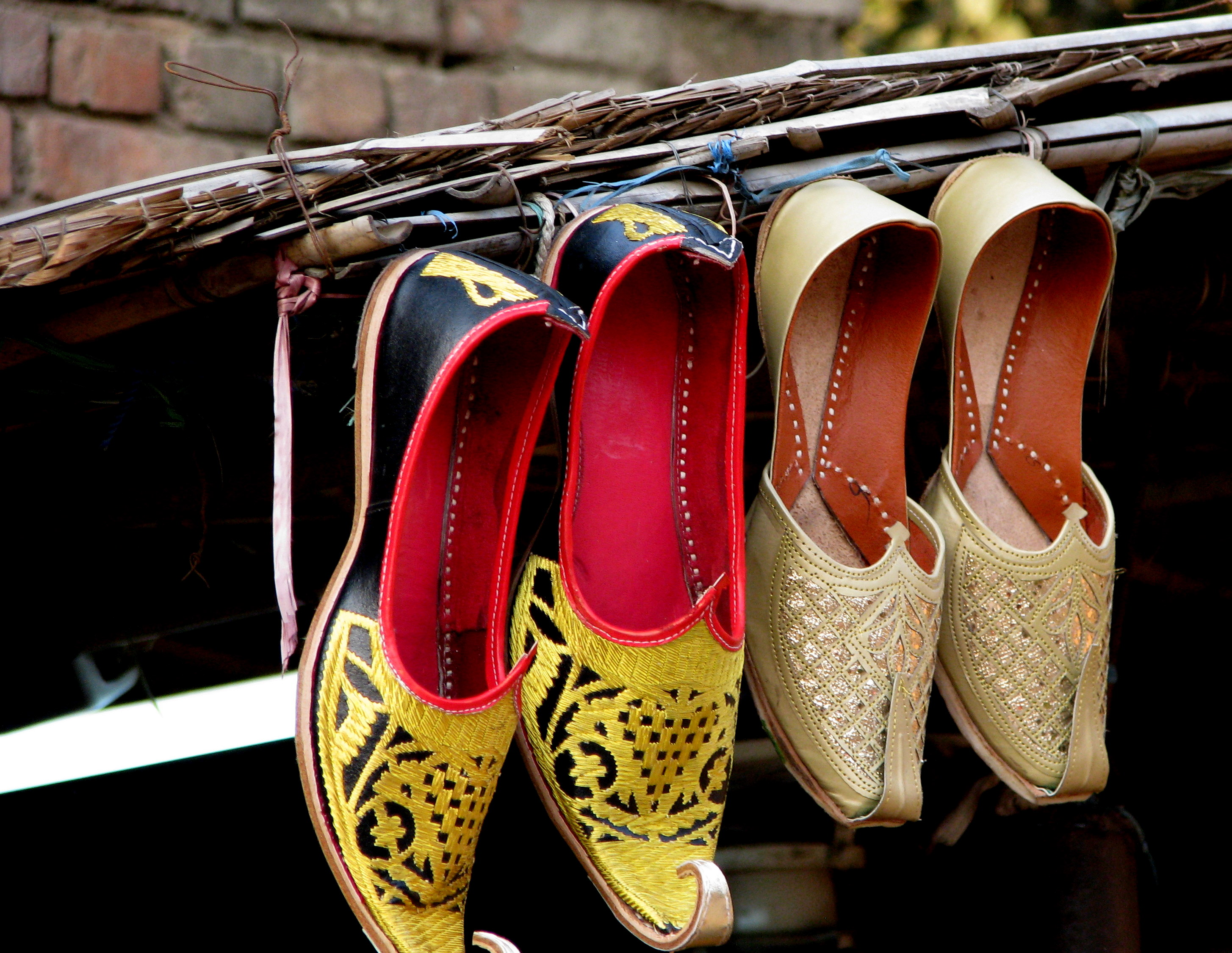
Punjabi jutti for men with extended curved tip, or nokh

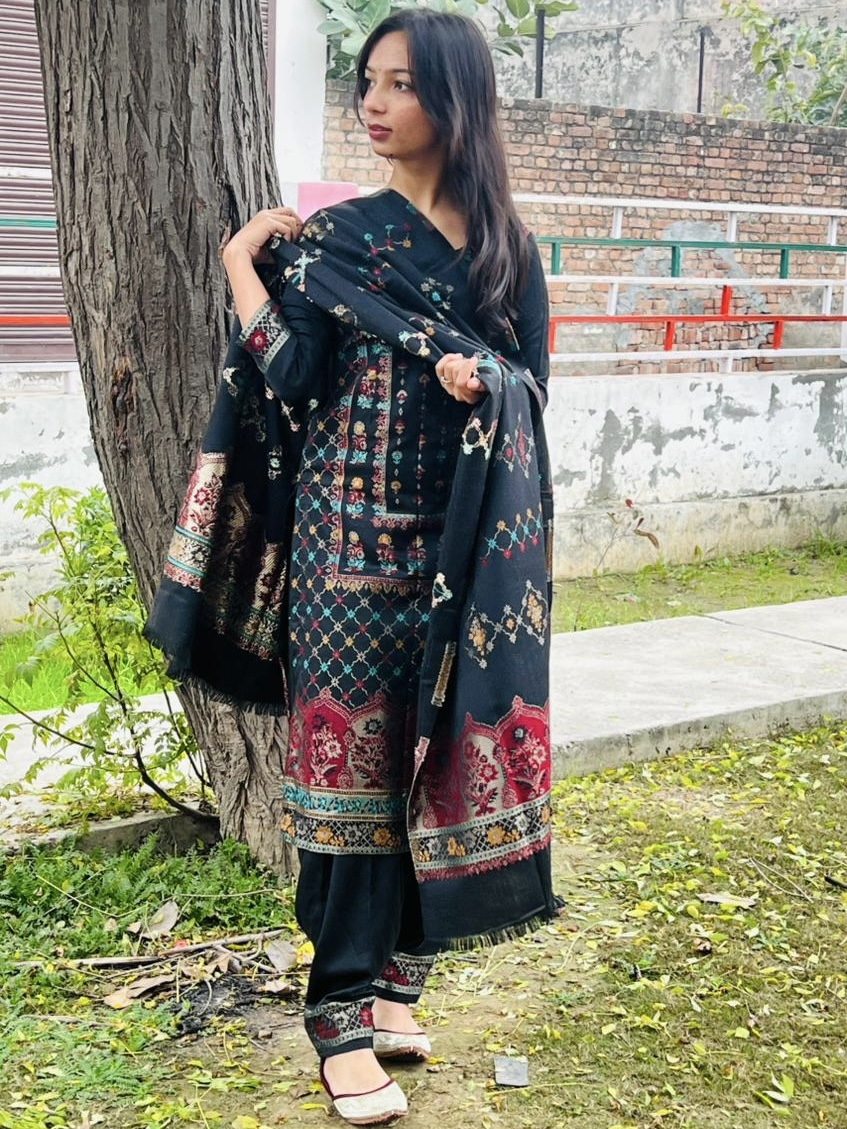
Punjabi girl wearing traditional suit and Punjabi jutti

== Patiala salwar ==
The Patiala salwar was developed in Patiala and is very popular with women.

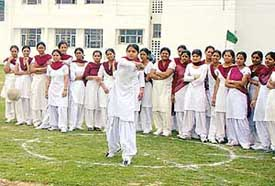
School girls wearing Patiala Salwar

=== Bahawalpuri shalwar suit ===
The Bahawalpuri shalwar originates from the Bahawalpur region of Punjab, Pakistan. The Bahawalpuri shalwar is very wide and baggy with many voluminous folds. The material traditionally used for the Bahawalpuri shalwar and suthan is known as Sufi which is a mixture of cotton warp mixed with silk weft and gold threads running down the material. The other name for these types of mixed cloth is shuja khani. The Bahawalpuri shalwar is worn with the Bahawalpur style kameez, the Punjabi kurta or chola.

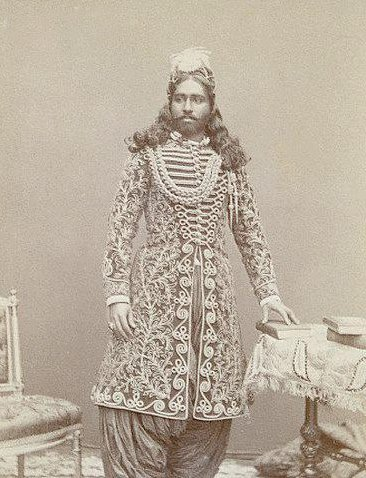
Nawab Muhammad of Bahawalpur (1868-1900) wearing a loose Bahawalpuri shalwar.

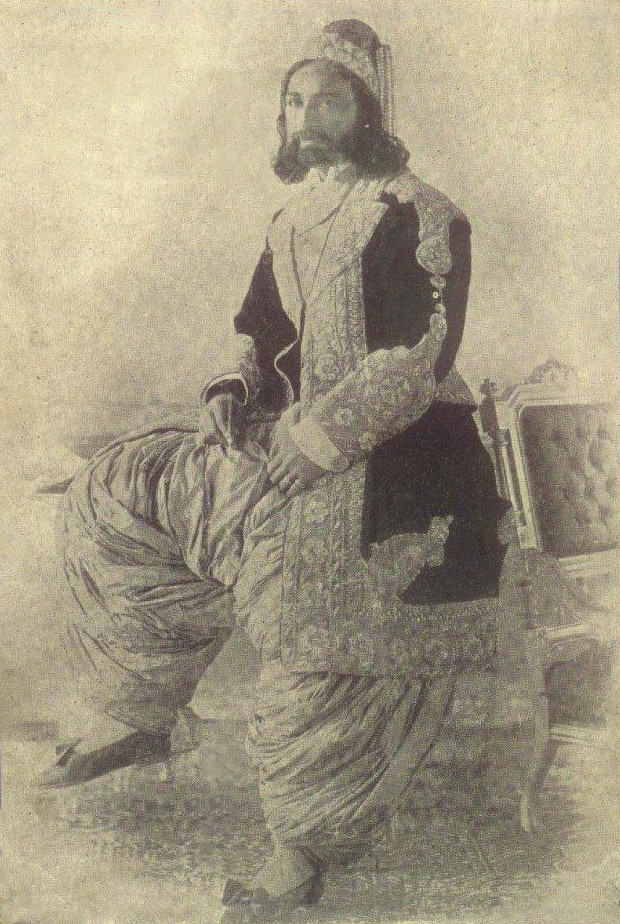
Prince Suba Sadiq Abbasi, Bahawalpur

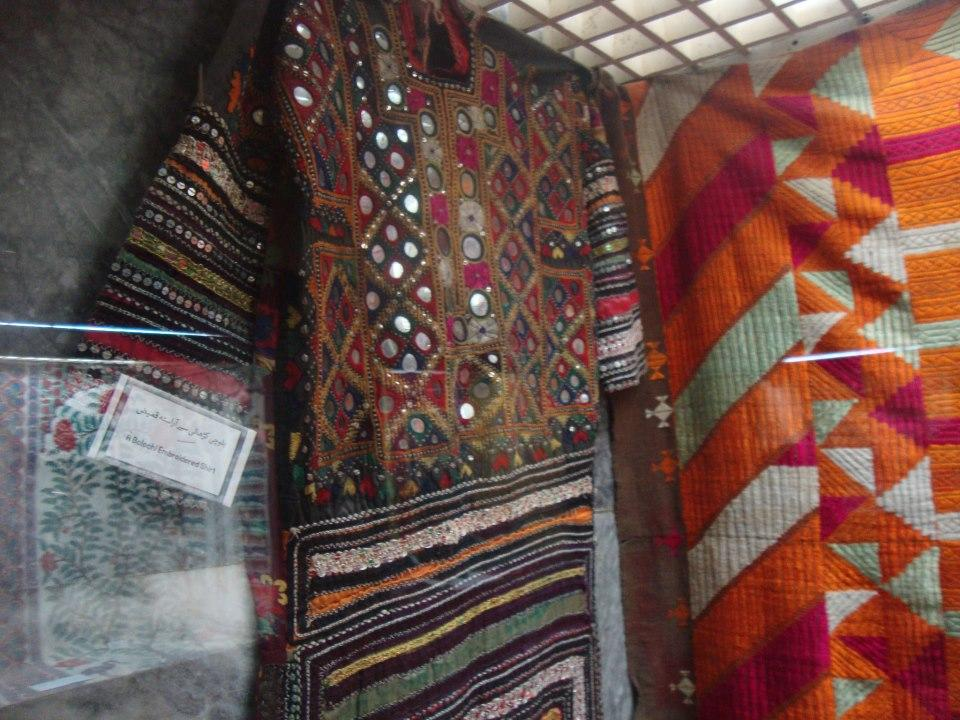
Bahawalpur kameez

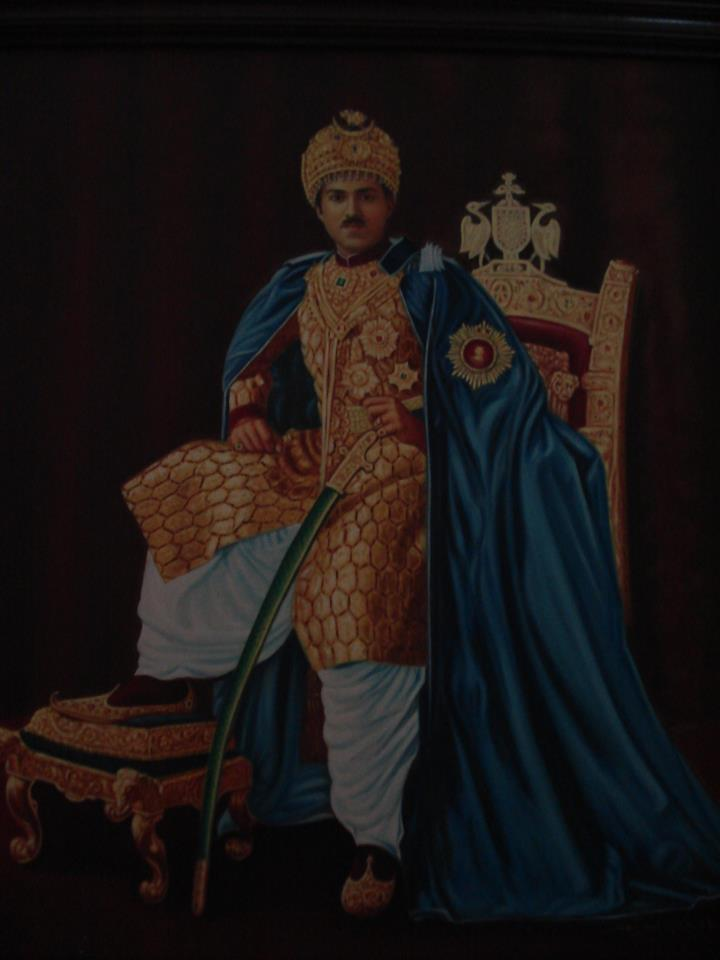
Nawab Sadiq Khan Fifth (died 1966) in the Bahawalpuri shalwar

=== Multani shalwar suit ===
The Multani shalwar, also known as the 'ghaire wali' (round shape) shalwar as it is very wide around the waist, originates from the Multan area of the Punjab, Pakistan. The style is similar to the Sindhi kancha shalwar as both are derivatives of the pantaloon shalwar worn in Iraq and adopted in these locations during the 7th century A.D. The Multani shalwar is very wide, baggy, full and has folds like the Punjabi suthan. The upper garments include the Punjabi kameez and the chola of the Punjab region.

== Fabric prints and embroidery ==
Block printing on cotton and other materials is popular in Multan which utilises local Sajarak prints. Cholistan, Bahawalpur and Multan are known for its tie-dyeing material which is popular in this region.

The embroidery styles of the Punjab region include the styles of Multani embroidery which features kalabatun patterns using thin wires. This type of embroidery is also common in the rest of the Punjab region. Kalabatan surkh involves using gold wires on orange coloured and red silk. Kalabatan safed involves using silver wires on white material. There are two kinds of gold embroidery, one of a solid and rich kind called kar-chob and the other called tila-kar or kar-chikan utilising gold thread. The former is used for carpets and saddle cloths whereas the latter is used for dresses. The Punjab region also uses mukesh embroidery: mukesh bati-hui, twisted tinsel, gokru, flattened gold wire for embroidery of a heavy kind, and waved mukesh, made by crimping mukesh batihui with iron tongs.

Ludhiana and Amritsar are known for embroidery using white, silver and gold threads on clothes such as chogas and waistcoats (phatuhi). Kangra is known for the patterns embroidered on its handkerchiefs known as Kangra rumal. The designs include representations of religious stories. These rumals are also embroidered in Chamba.

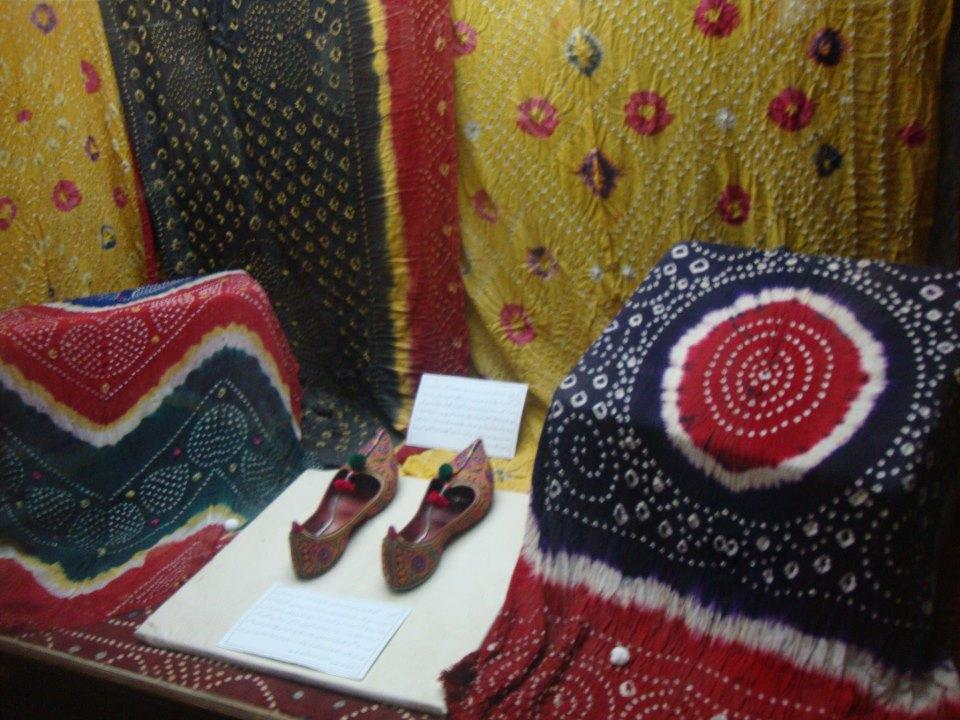
Cholistan tye-dying

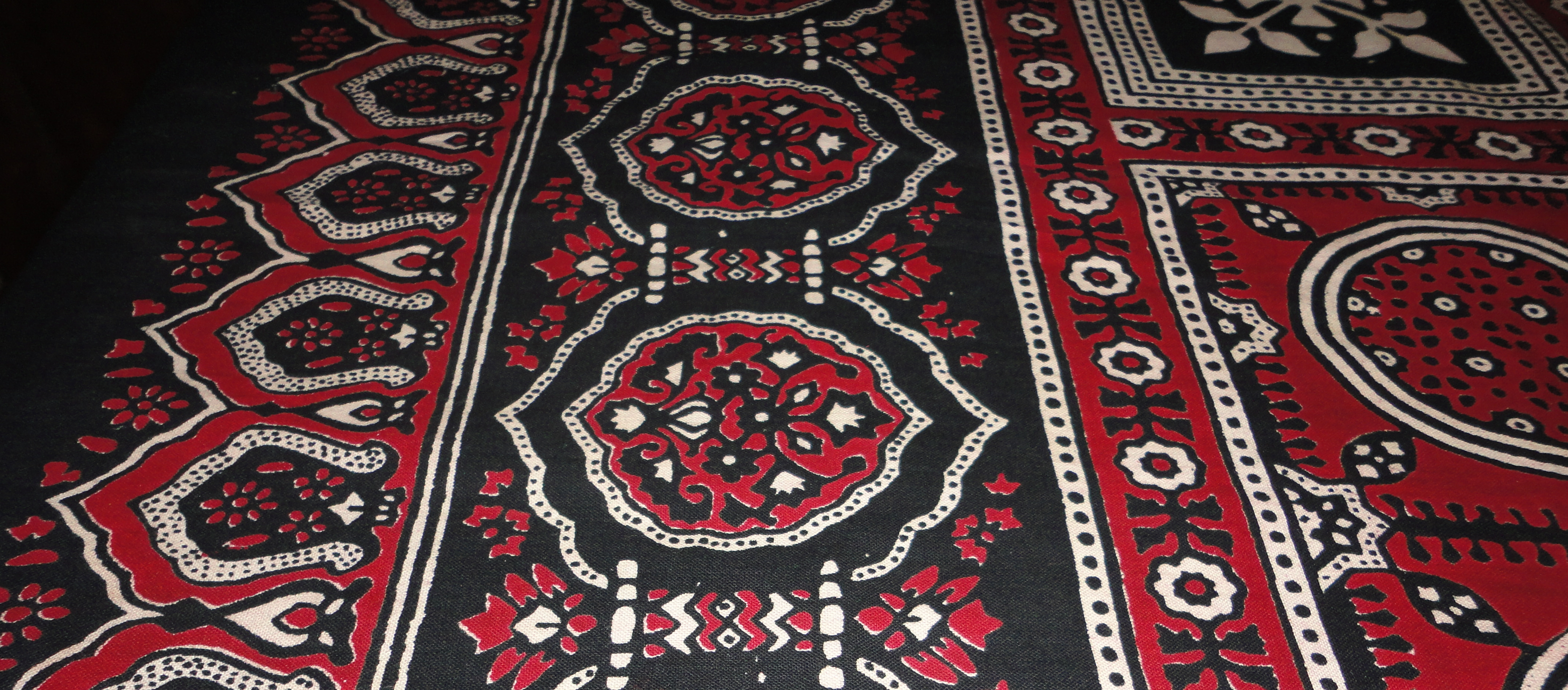
Maroon ajrak shawl

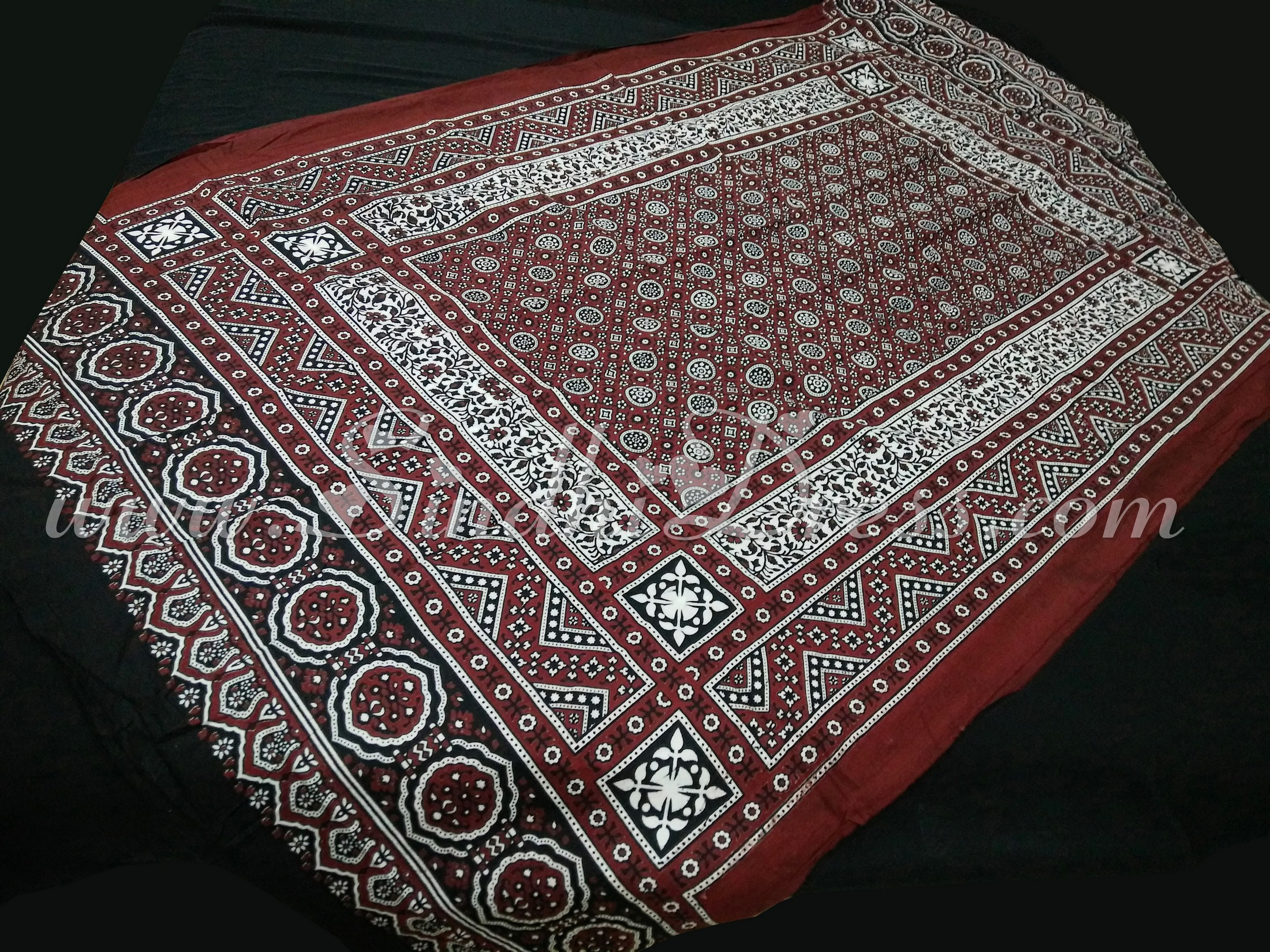
Maroon ajrak shawl

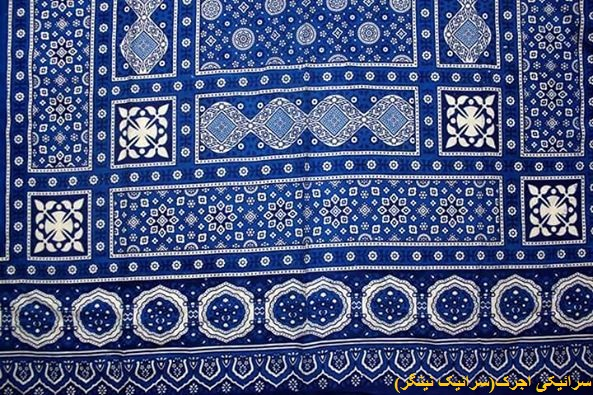
Blue ajrak shawl

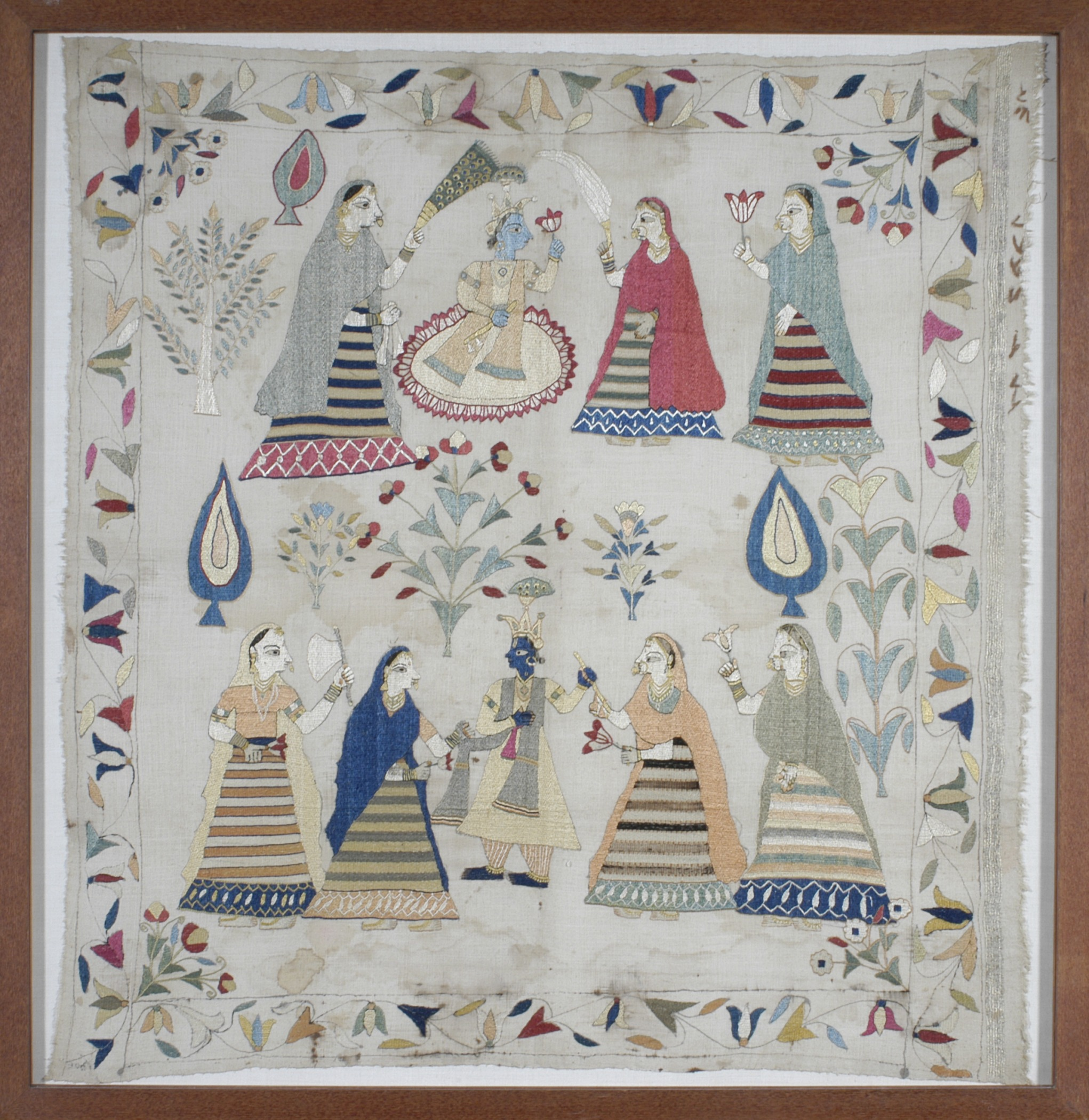
Chamba Rumal with Scenes of Gopis Adoring Krishna

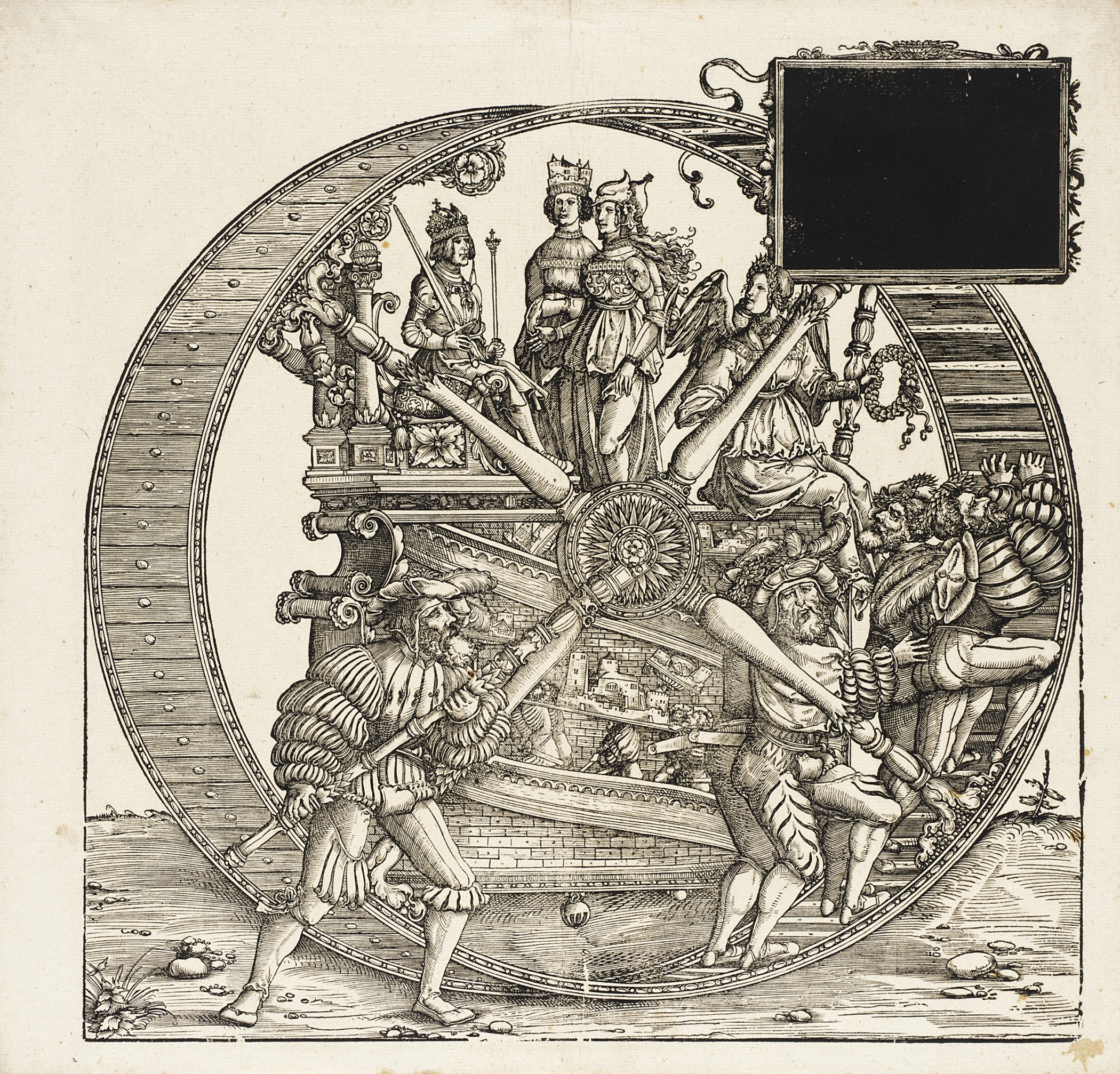
Head Cloth (Phulkari)

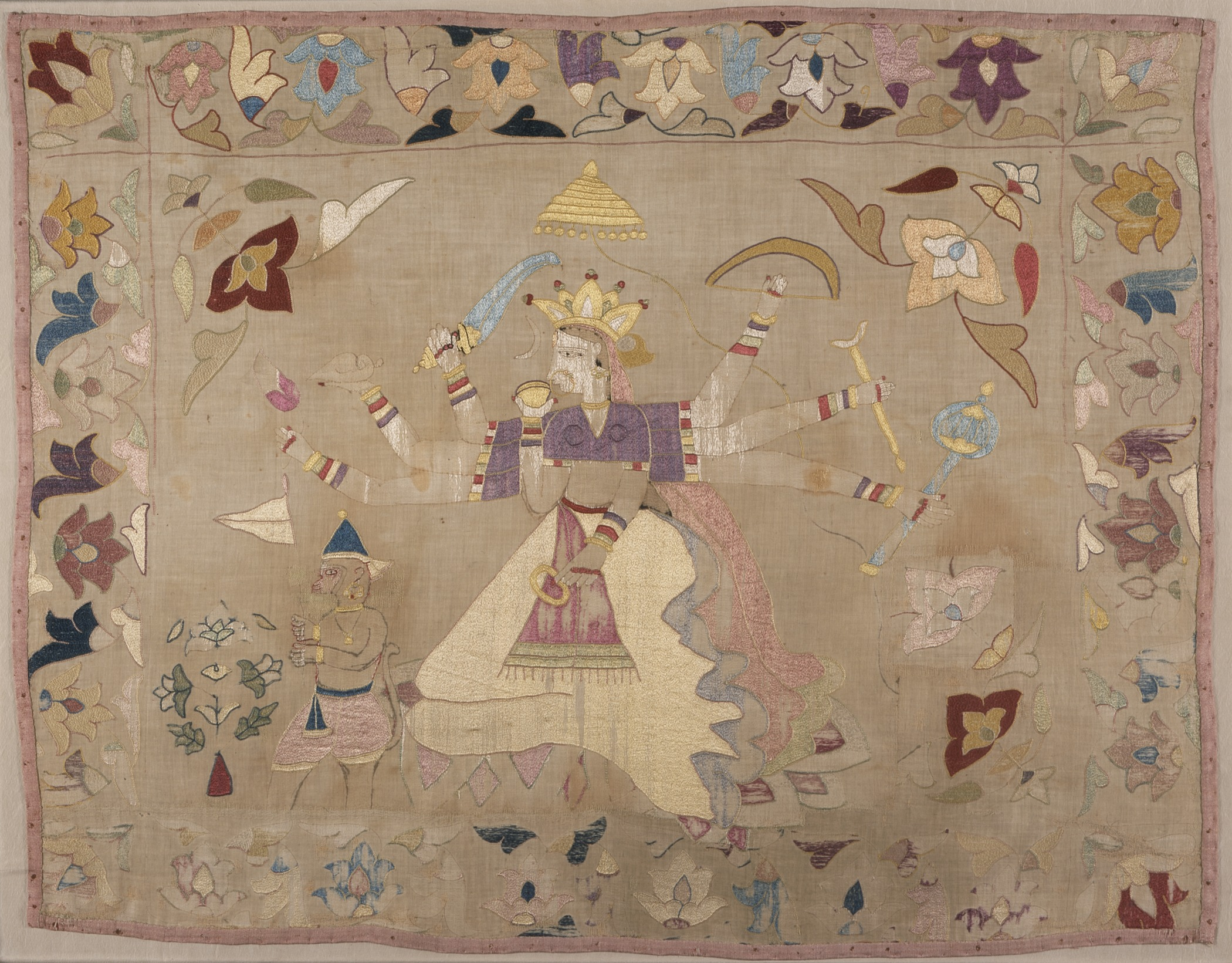
Chamba Rumal with Scenes of Sita and Hanuman

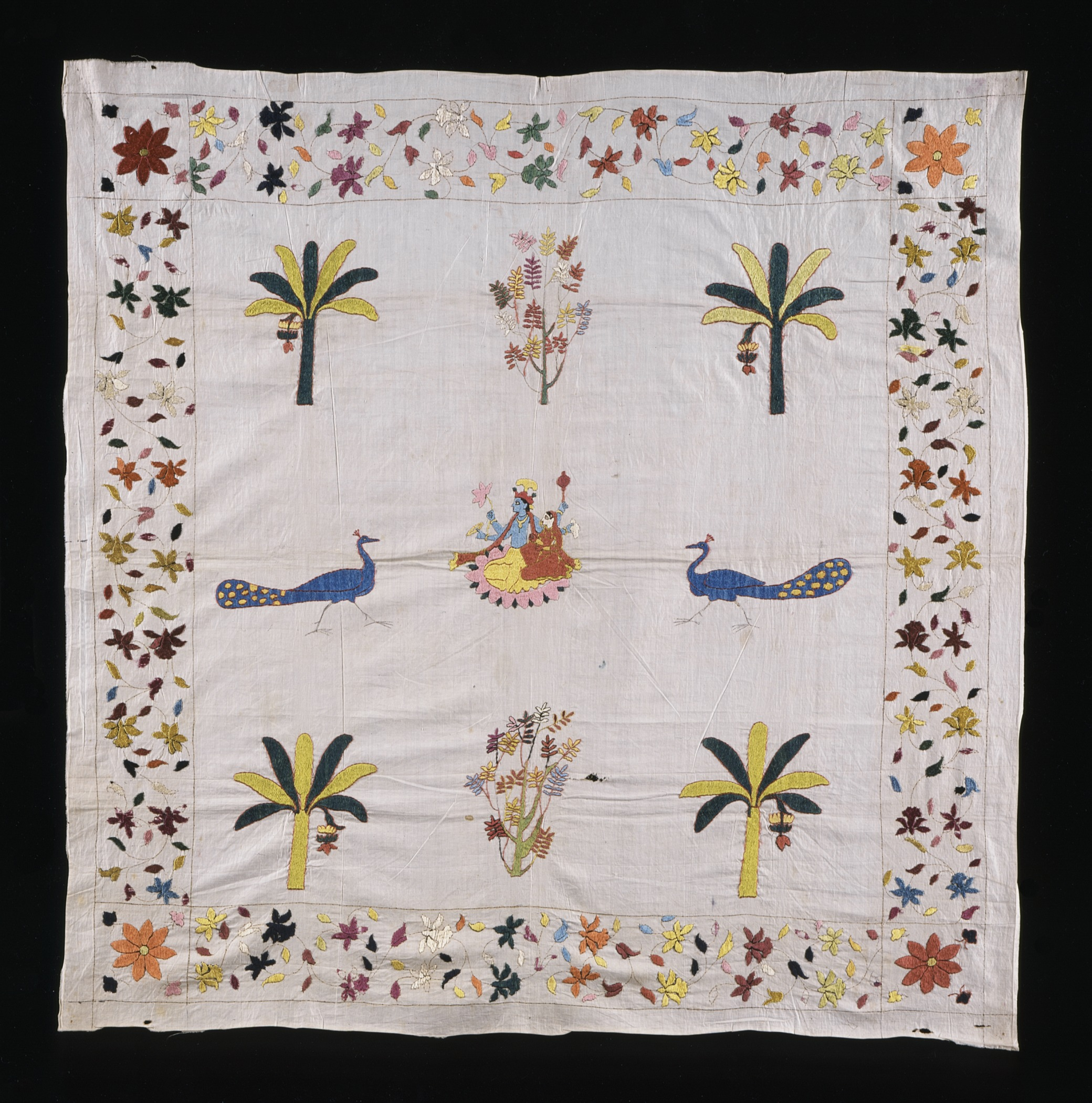
Chamba Rumal with Krishna and Radha

== Phulkari ==
The Phulkari is the traditional Punjabi embroidery used to embroider shawls and head scarfs in the Punjab region. Although Phulkari means floral work, the designs include not only flowers but also cover motifs and geometrical shapes.

There is reference to Phulkari in ancient texts, folk legends, and literature of Punjab. In Harishcharitra, the biography of the Emperor Harshavardhana (590-647 CE), the last ruler of great ancient Indian Vardhana empire, the seventh-century chronicler Bana wrote, "Some people were embroidering flowers and leaves on the cloth from the reverse side," which is a technical description of Phulkari embroidery. However, the earliest reference to the word Phulkari is in Punjabi literature in the 18th century Waris Shah's version of Heer Ranjha (a legendary Punjabi tragic romance) which describes the wedding trousseau of the female protagonist Heer and lists various clothing items with Phulkari embroidery. The first extensive English publication on Phulkari was by Flora Annie Steel in 1880 where she describes the various styles and exhibited the varieties in picture form. In its present form, Phulkari embroidery has been popular since the 15th century. Pal (1960) believes that no matter its origin, Phulkari work is distinctive and uniquely Punjabi.

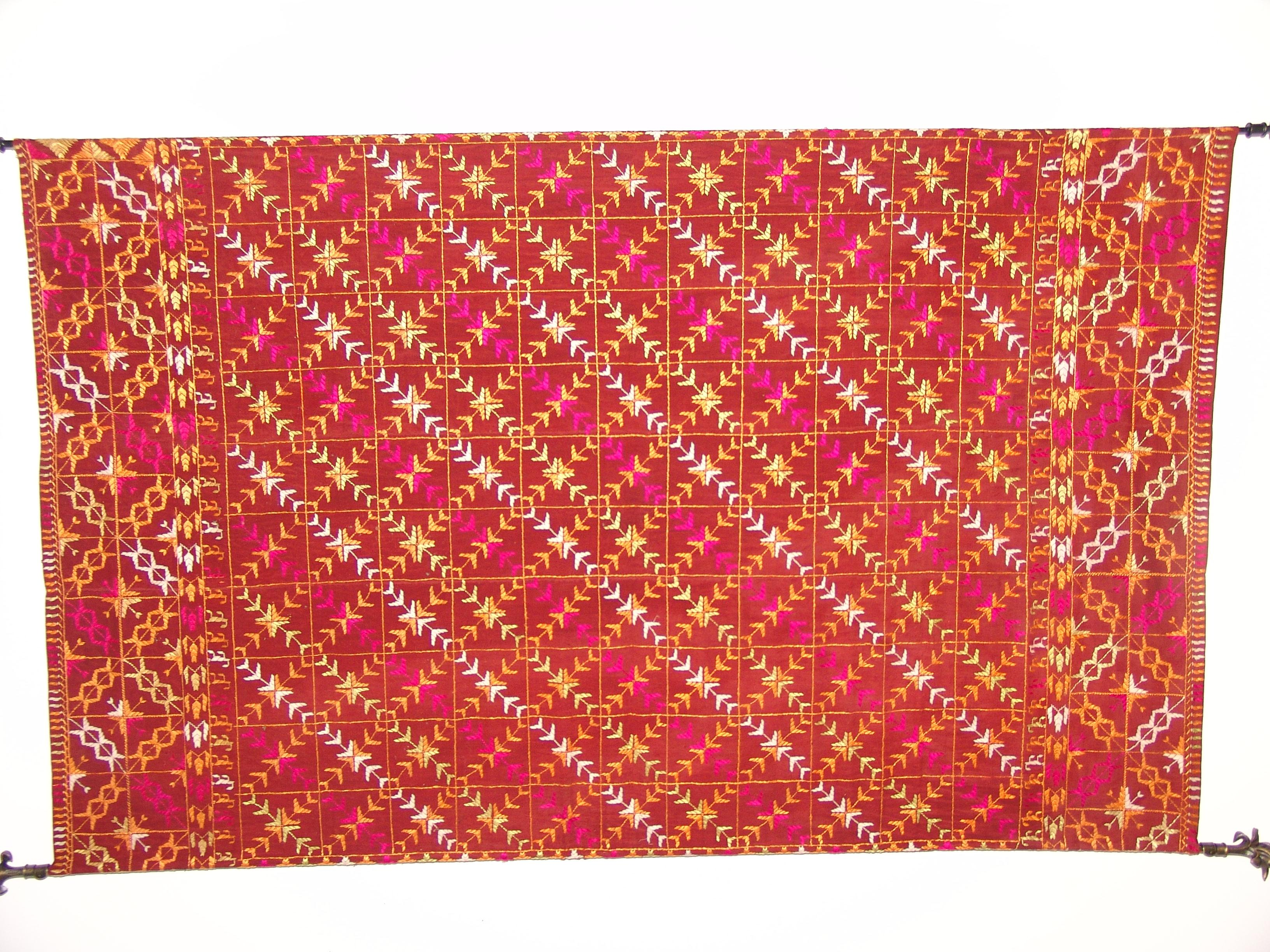
Phulkari from Patiala

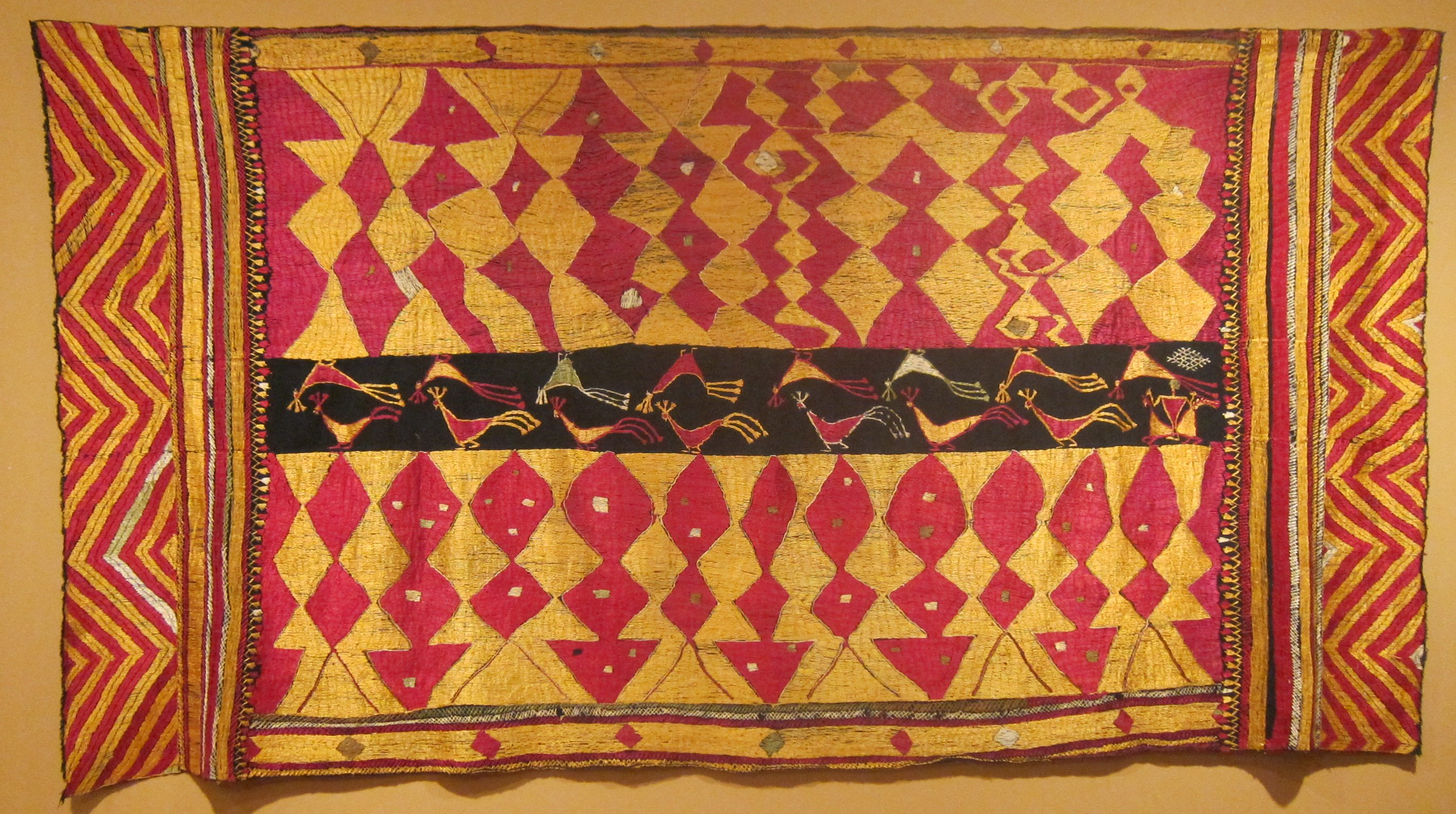
'Phulkari' (bridal shawl), Punjab, early 20th century, cotton, silk and embroidery, Honolulu Academy of Arts

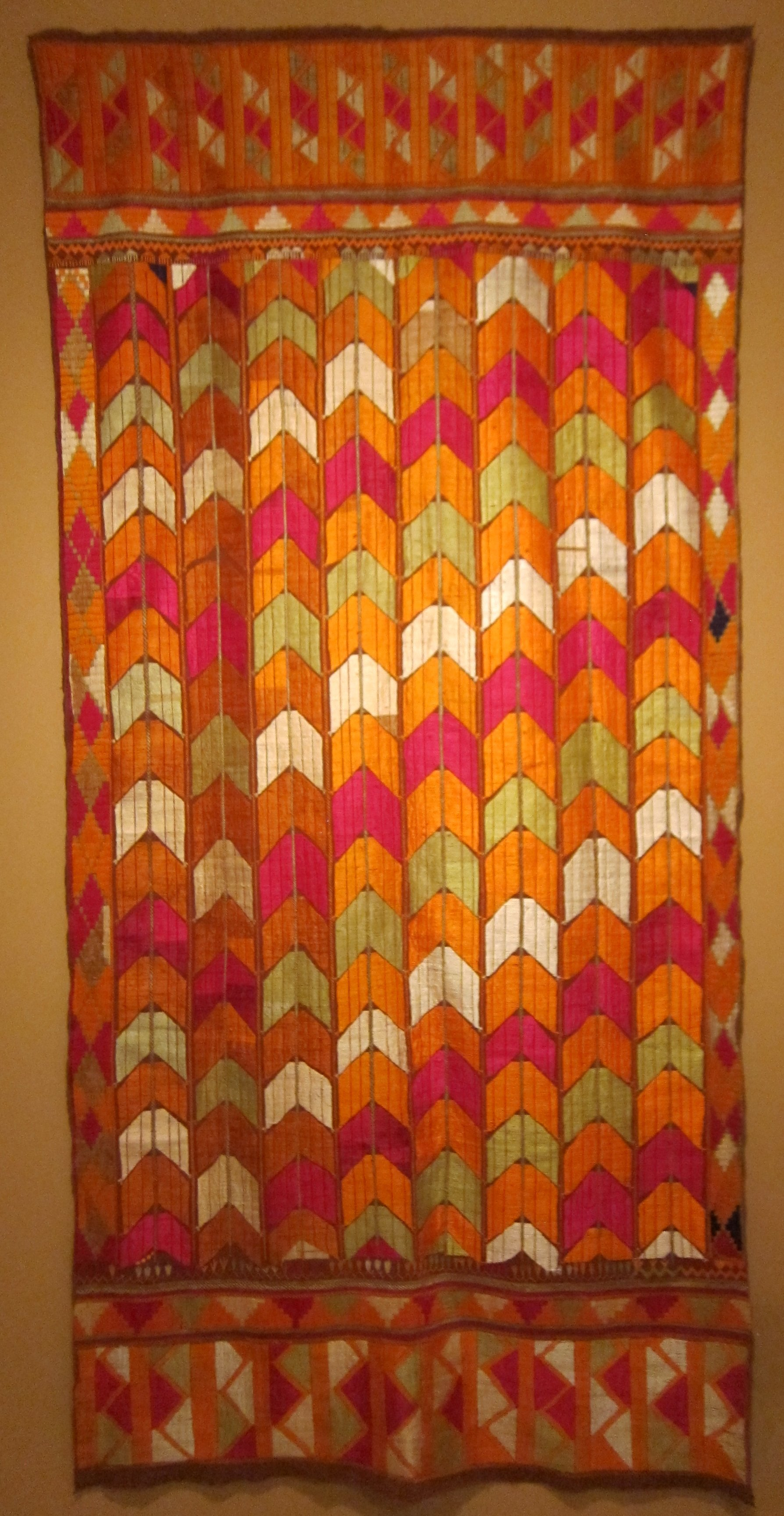
Phulkari from Punjab, India, 20th century, khadi, silk, plain weave, embroidery, Honolulu Museum of Art

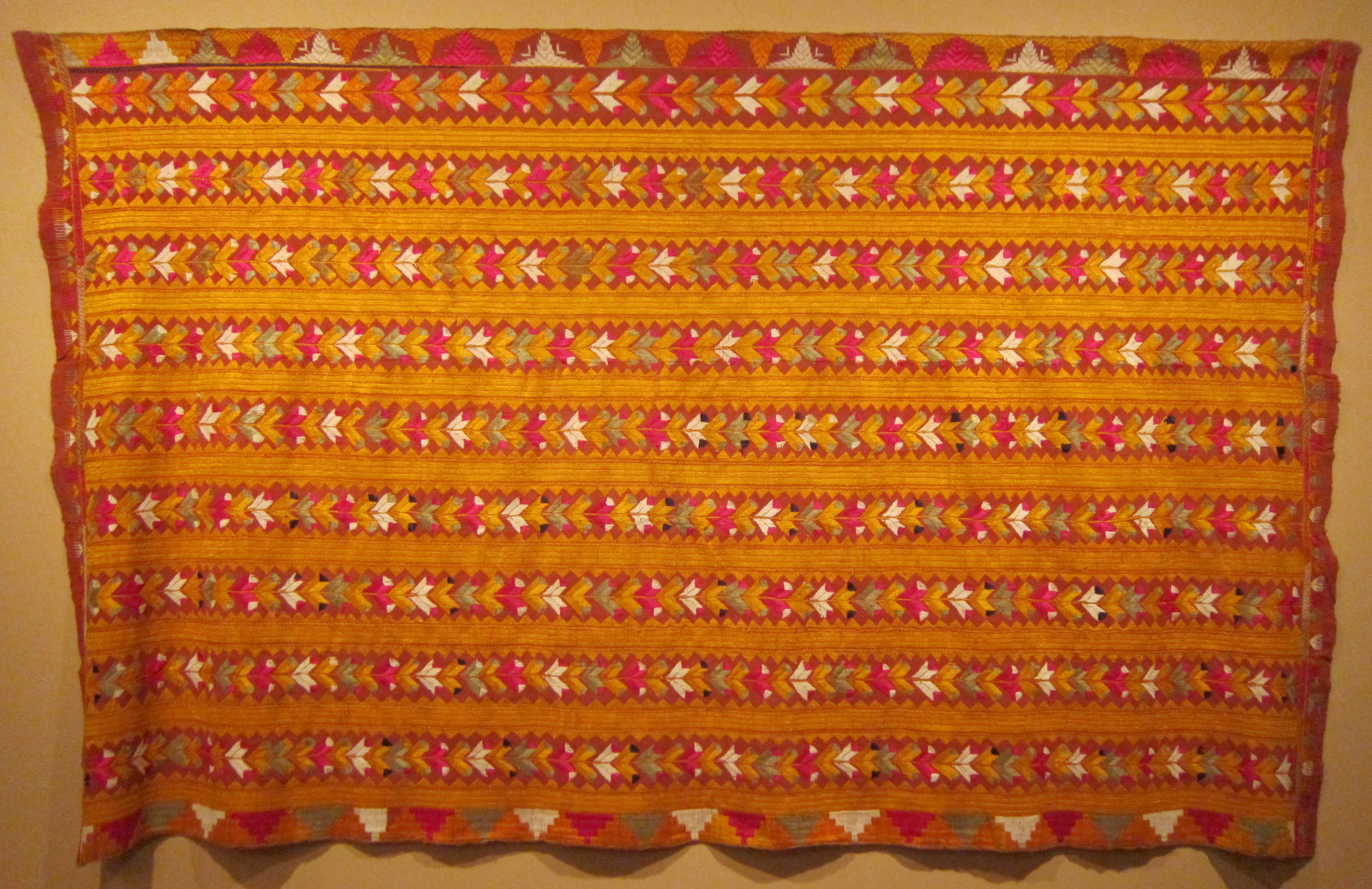
Bridal shawl (phulkari) from Punjab, khadi (hand-spun, hand-woven cotton), silk, plain weave, embroidery, Honolulu Museum of Art

== Luanchari ==
Luanchari is a full-dress made of two parts stitched together: the upper part is the choli and the lower is the lehanga. It is traditional garment worn by Gaddis of Himachal Pradesh.

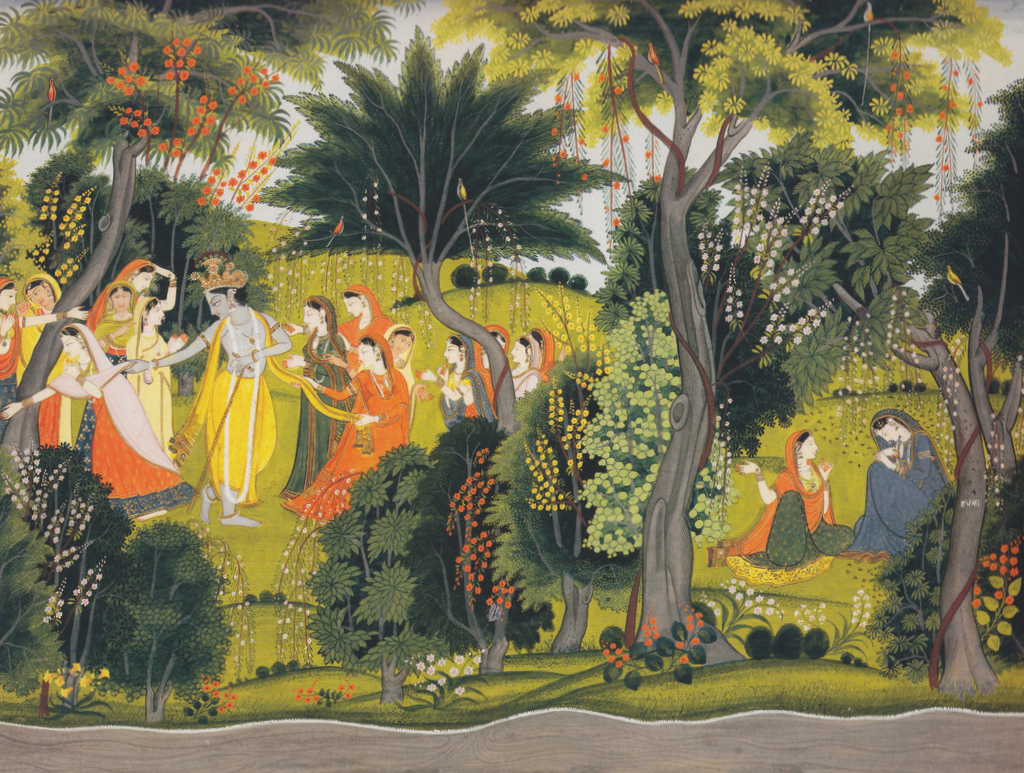
Pahari painting depicting women in Luanchari. ca.1760

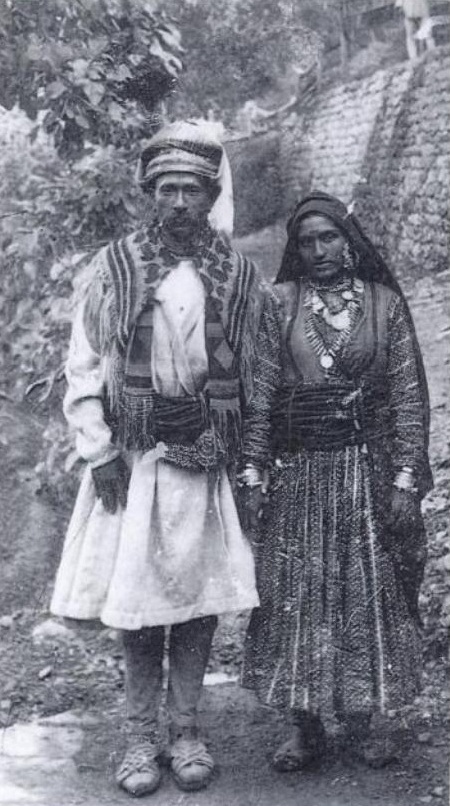
Himachal woman in Luanchari

== Punjabi ghuttana ==
The Punjabi ghuttana was popular with women and men in the Punjab region, a type of pajama which is shorter than the full length pajama, and is tight and ends at the calf. Its variation is still worn in Jammu.

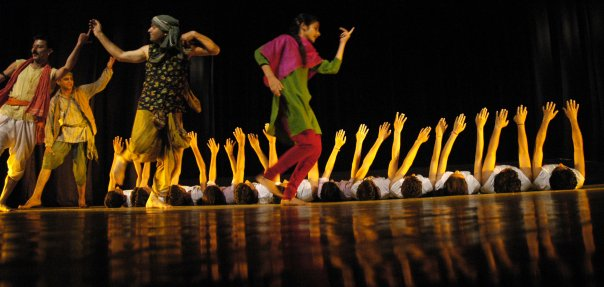
Men and boys wearing a knee length variation of the Punjabi ghuttana and Dogri kurta. The full suthan is tight from the knees to the ankles

== Churidar pajama ==
The use of the Churidar is traditionally associated with the northern regions of the sub-continent. Although there is no consensus as to its origins, the churidar pajama was adopted by the former princely families. In the Punjab region however, its use was amongst the general population.

The Churidar is popular all over the sub-continent and was developed in the Punjab region, and is associated with the Punjab. The churidar pajama can be of any colour but traditionally is of sussi (cotton) material, in blue with vertical stripes.

The churidar pajama is also known as the (full length) ghuttana. When soldiers from Lucknow travelled to the British Punjab province, they saw the long ghuttana pajama and adopted its use in Lucknow during the 19th century.

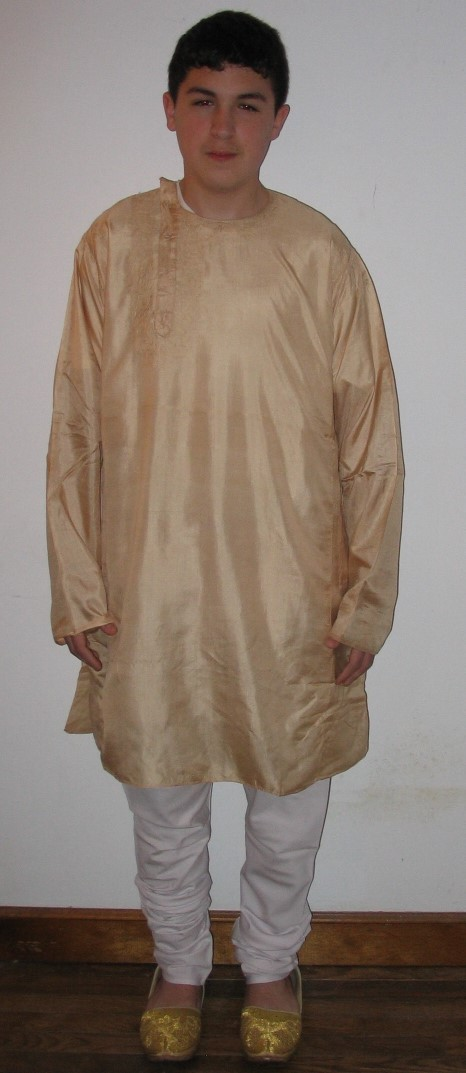
Cotton churidar worn with silk side-opening kurta and mojari shoes

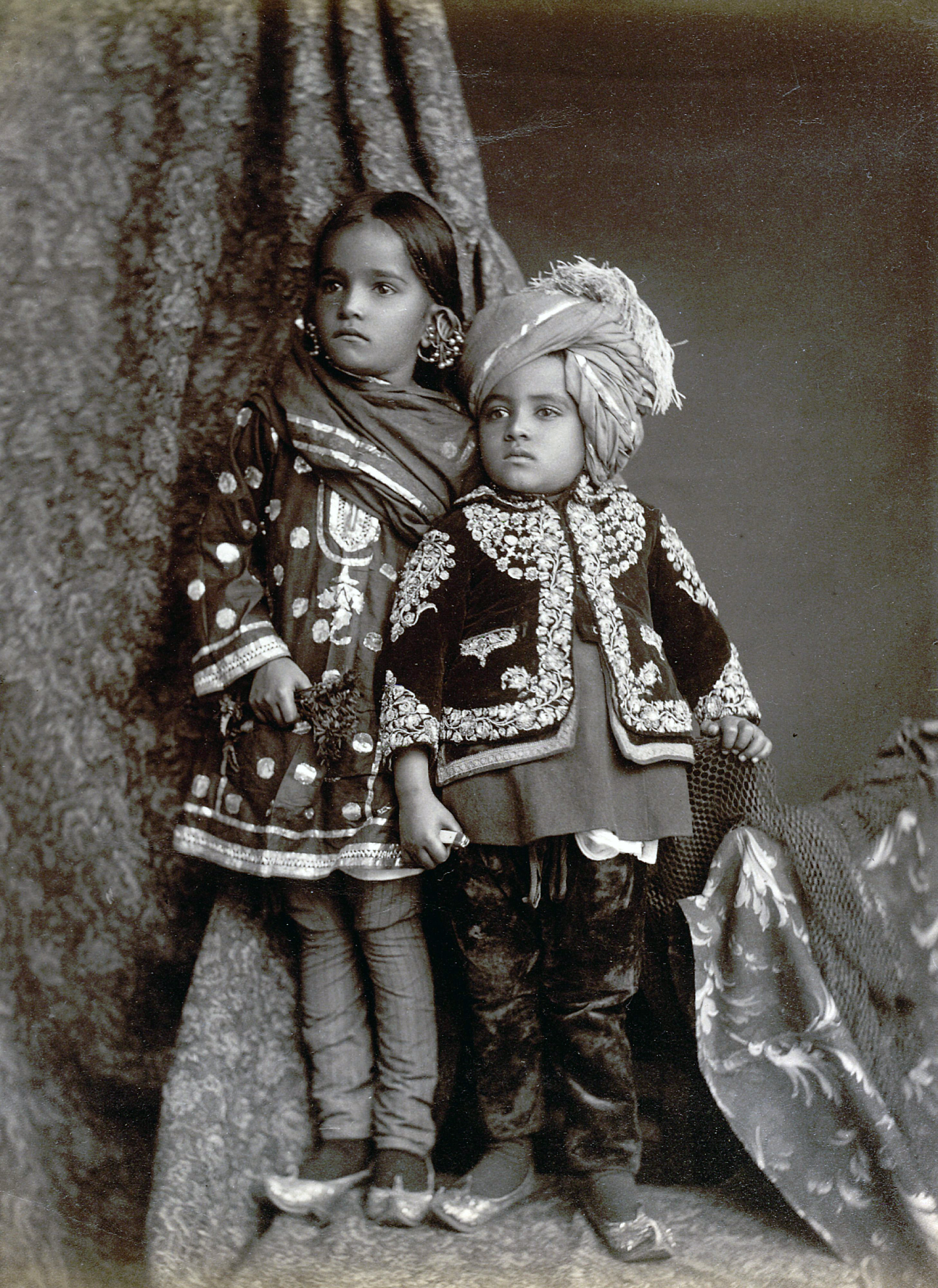
Portrait of Kashmiri children wearing churidar pyjamas circa 1890

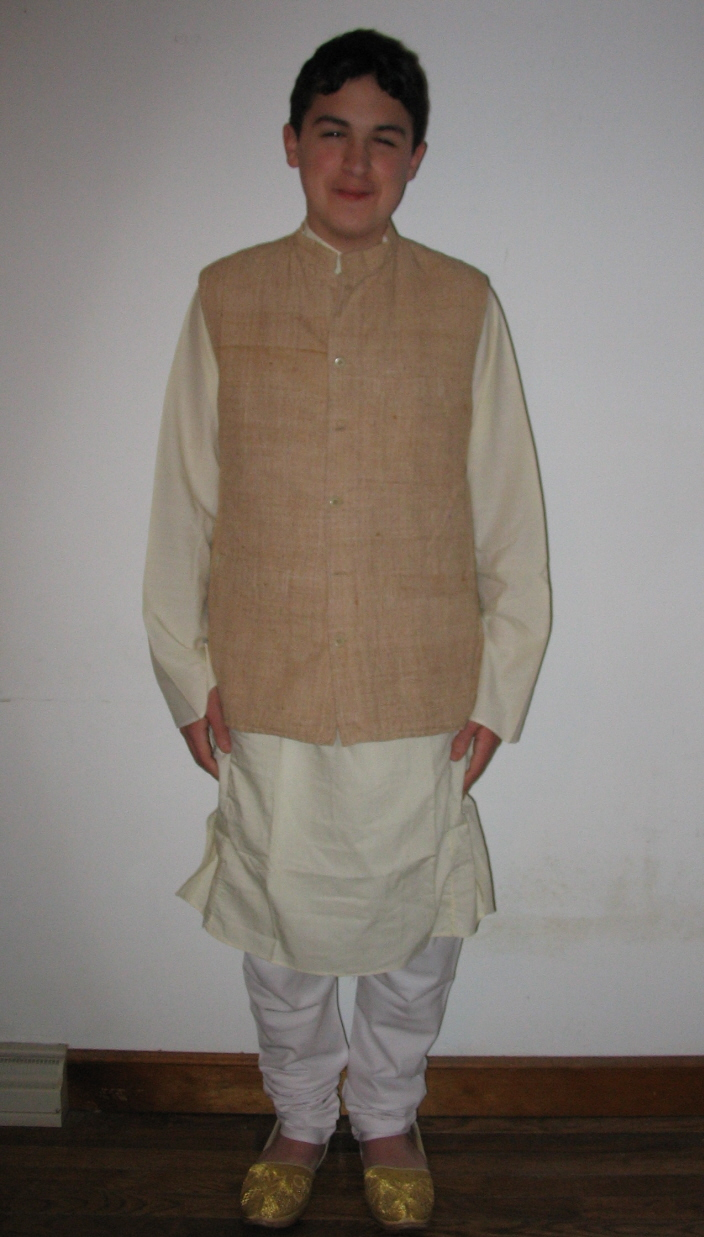
Cotton churidar with cotton kurta and Khadi Nehru jacket

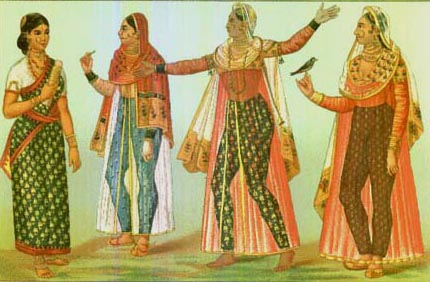
19th century Indian women wearing transparent skirts over churidar pants

== Jama ==
The jama was worn by men in the Punjab region during the Mughal period. The phrase "jora jama" refers to the clothes given by the maternal uncle to the groom, which points to the jama being part of Punjabi clothing (although grooms do not wear the jama now). A local style of shawl called the jamawar which was striped was used as a gown.

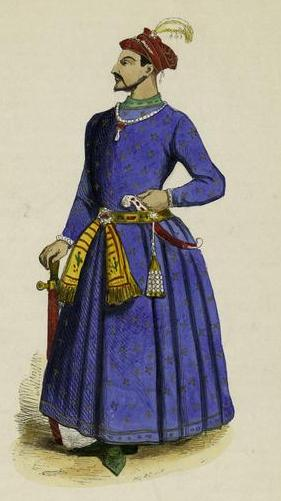
The commander of the Imperial Guard of Delhi

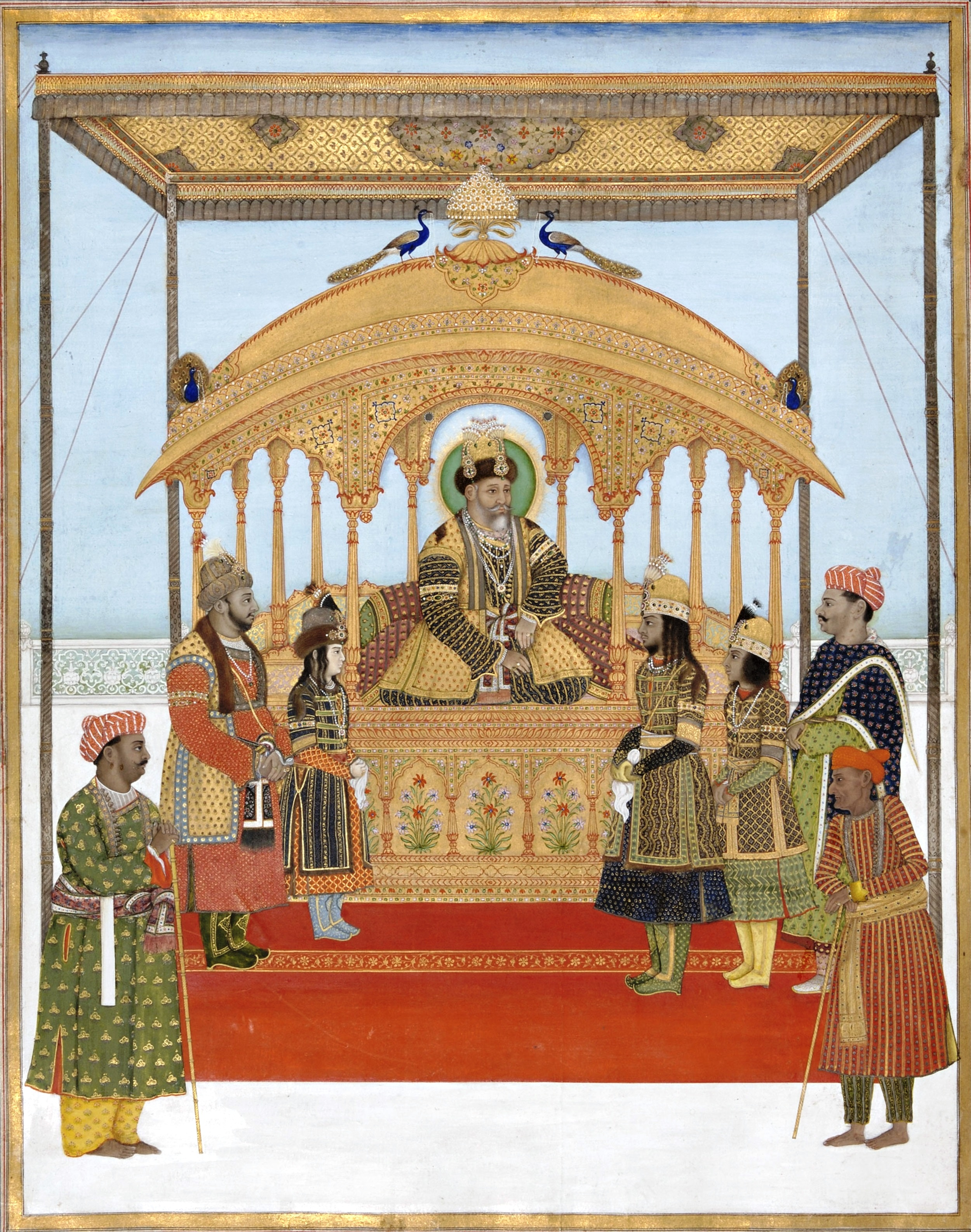
Ghulam Murtaza Khan The Delhi Darbar of Akbar II

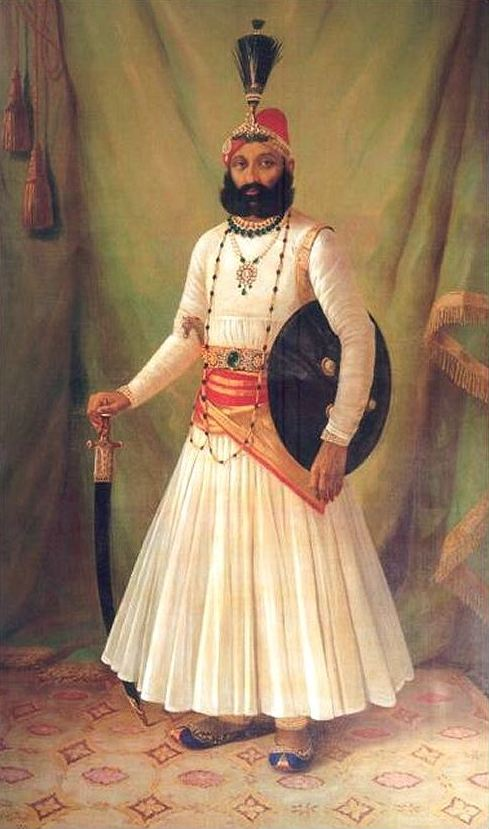
Raja Ravi Varma, Maharaja Fateh Singh

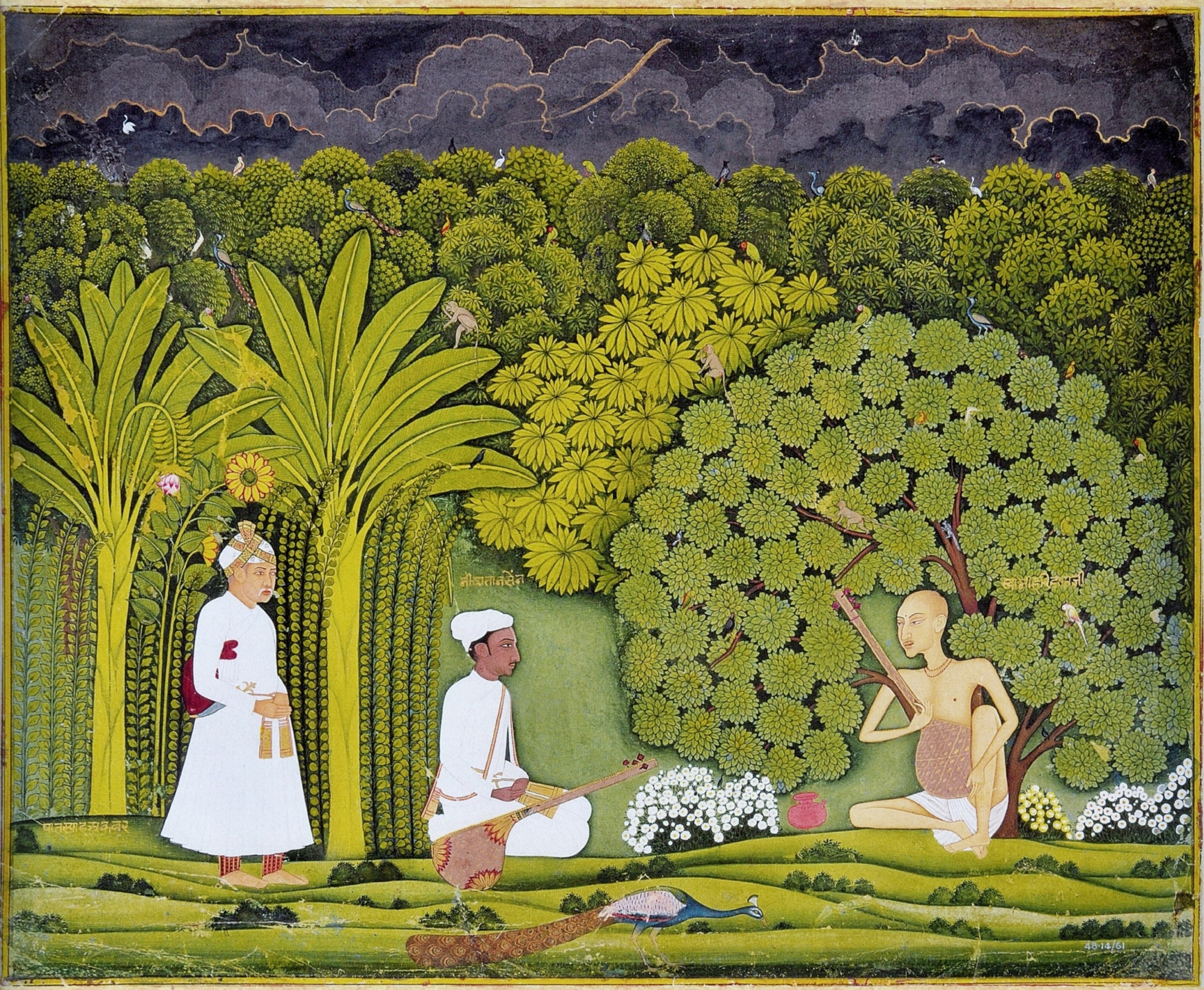
Akbar and Tansen visit Haridas

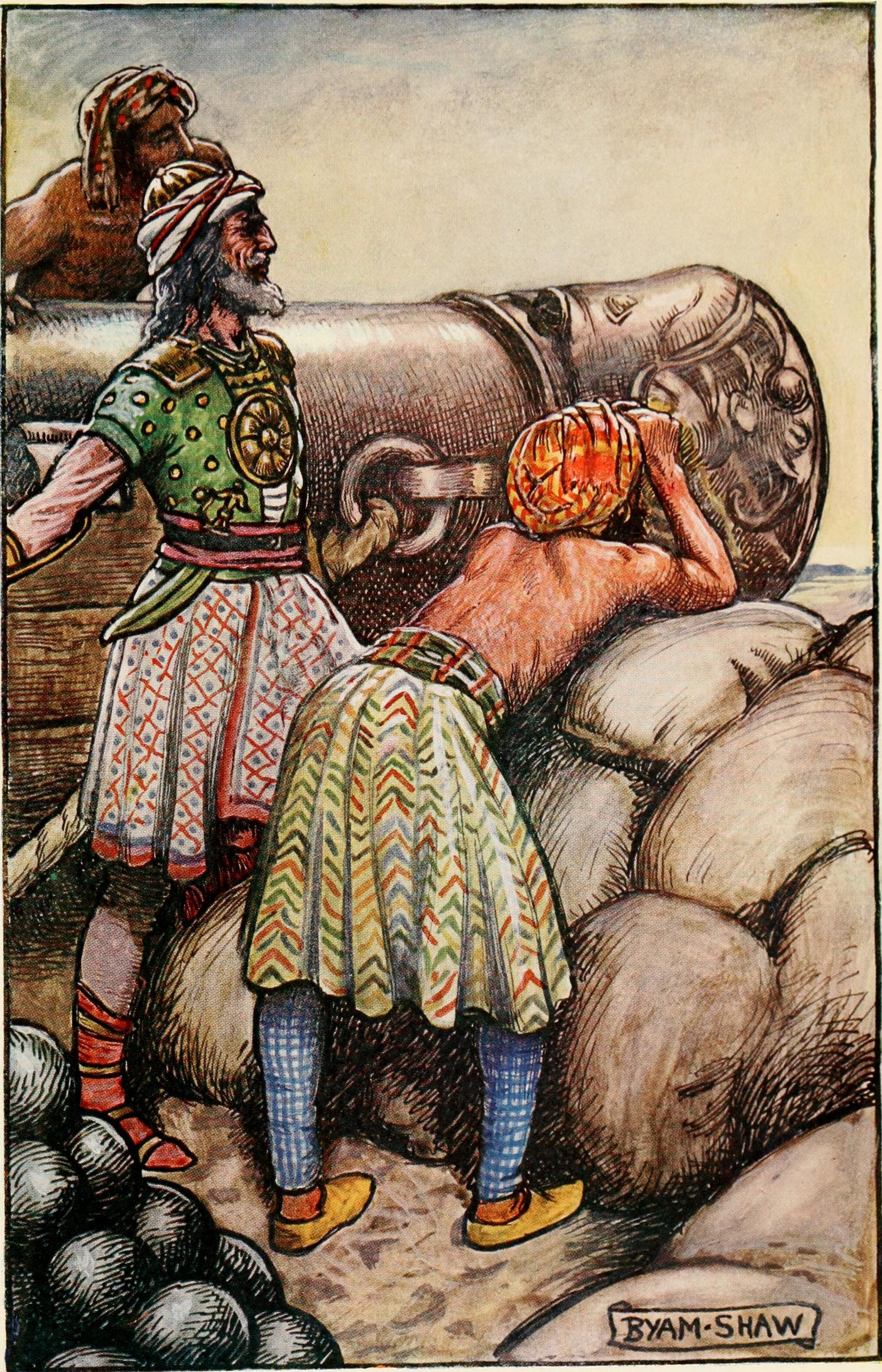
Mughal Army artillerymen during the reign of Akbar.

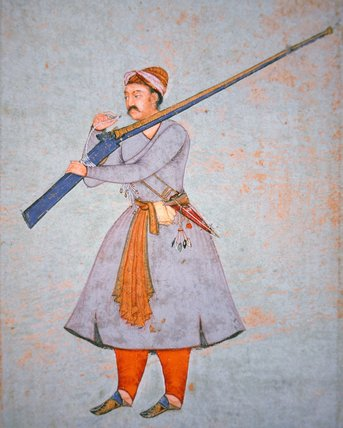
Officer of the Mughal Army, c.1585 (colour litho)

== Anga/Angarkha ==
The anga (robe) also known as an angarkha and peshwaj) is similar to a loose coat and wadded with cotton. The anga can be worn by men and women. When worn by men, it falls to below the knees, is a loose tunic and is fastened either to the right of the left. An angarkha typically does not have front buttons. Grooms traditionally wore the angarkha which has now been superseded by the achkan. The anga worn by women is a long robe.

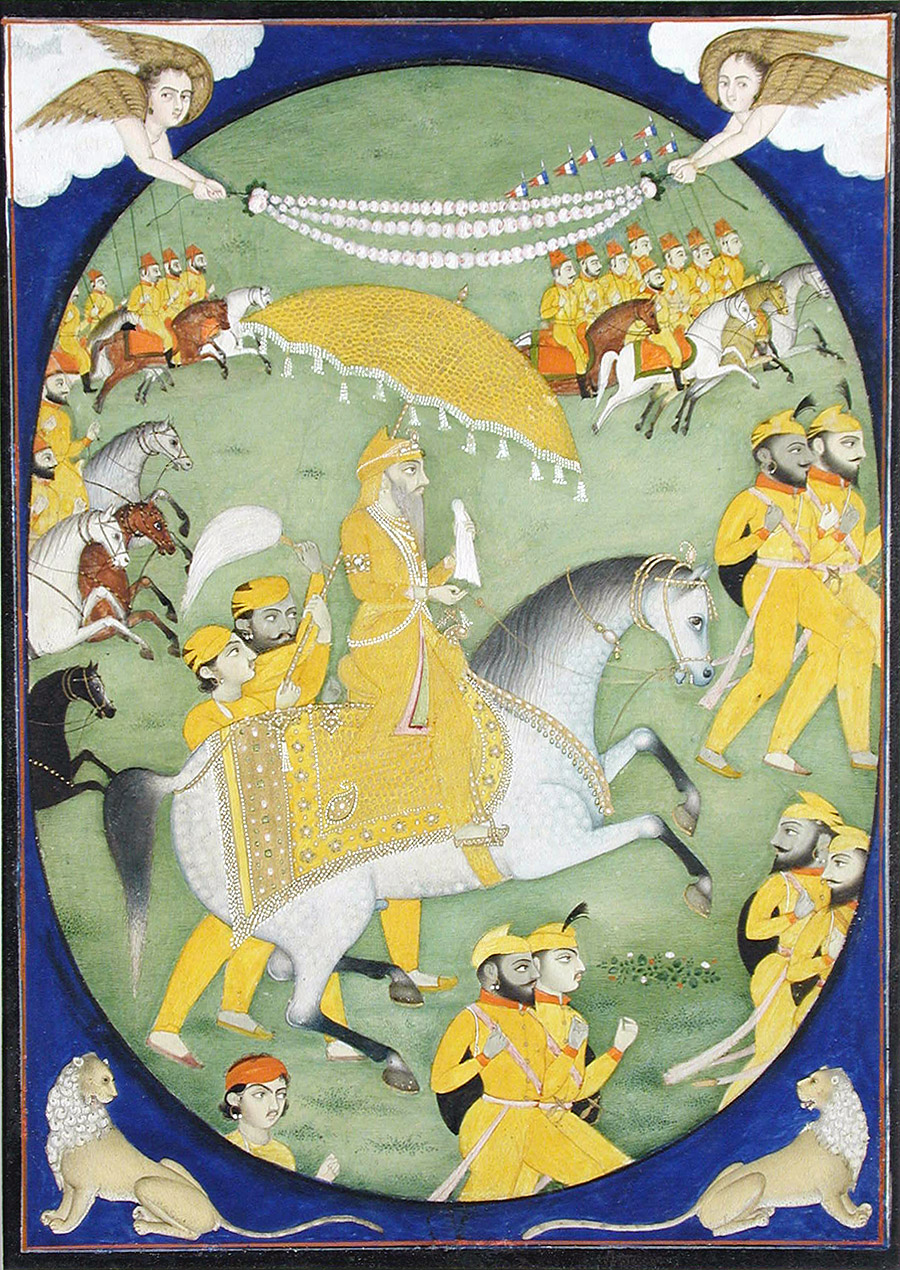
Ranjit Singh Equestrian in Saffron Robe

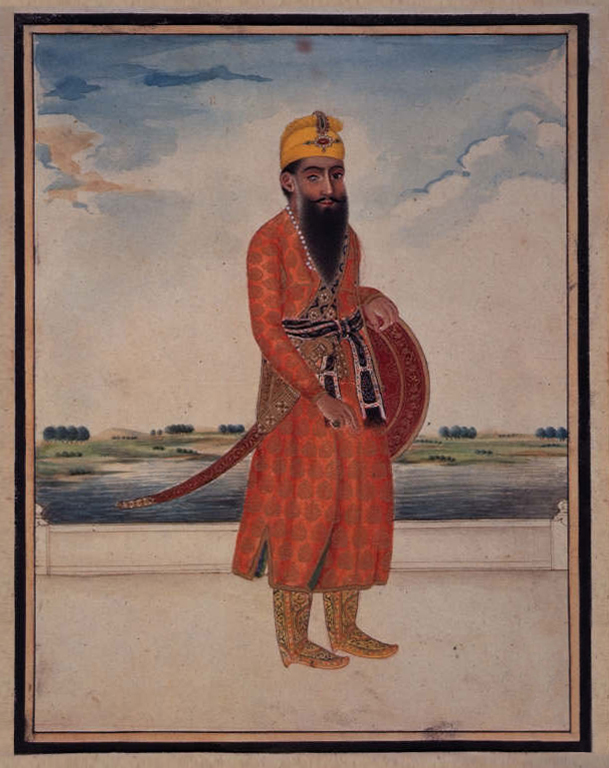
A watercolor portrait of Ranjit Singh who wore the angarkha during his reign.

=== Chamba angarkhi ===
The Chamba angarkhi of Himachal Pradesh is sewen tight at the torso, but below the waist it has an open fall like the modern skirt. The angarkhi is tied at the waist with a sash.

== Turban ==
Men traditionally wear the turban. In the past, large turbans were worn such as the type in Cholistan which could be up to 40 feet long. Now the turbans are shorter of various designs.

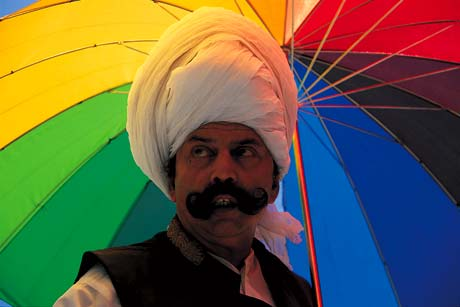
Malik Ata Muhammad Khan, Nawab of Kot Fateh Khan in Attock District, Punjab, Pakistan wearing a turban made from 6.4 metres (7.0 yards) of cloth

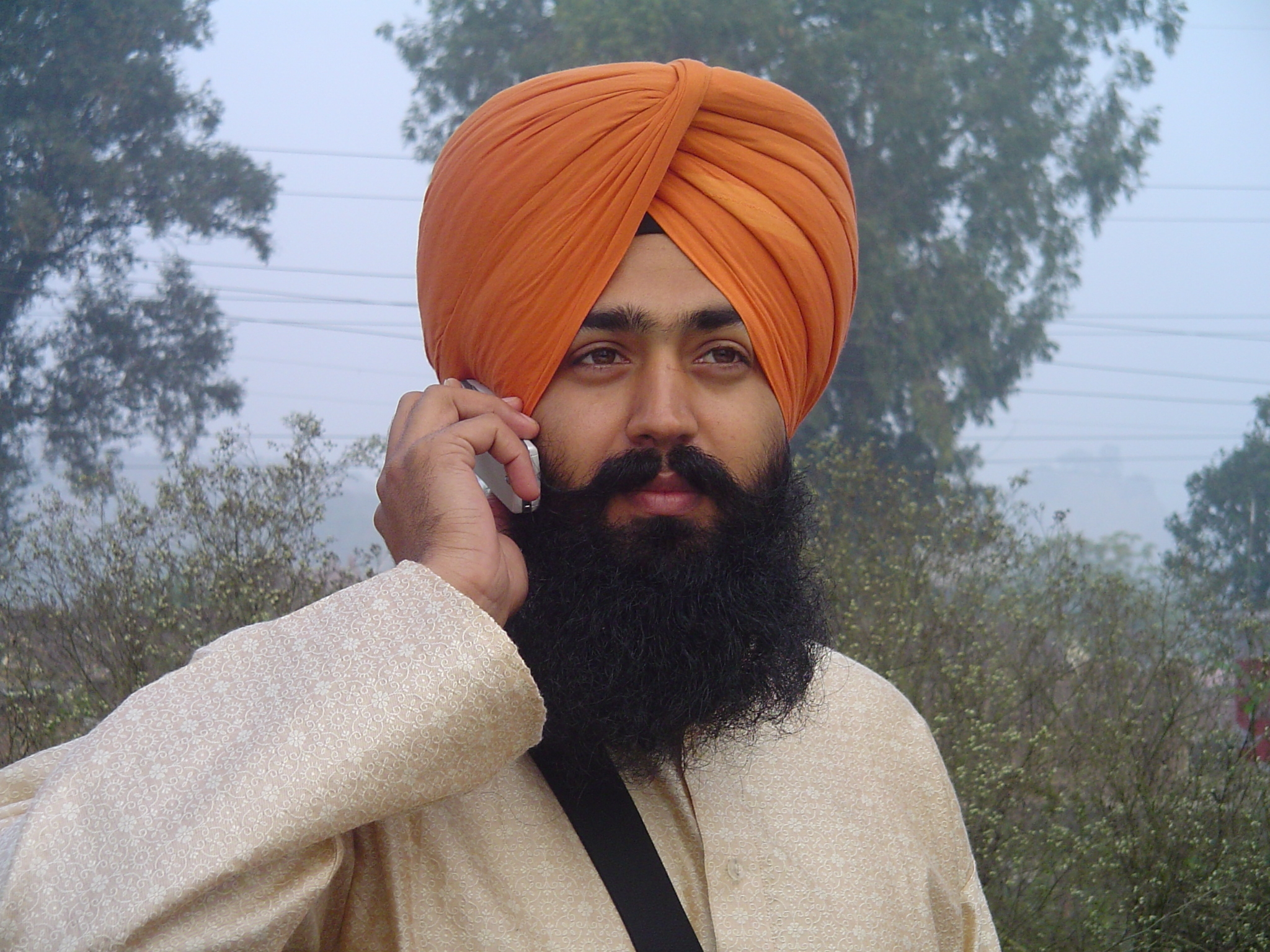
A sikh dastar

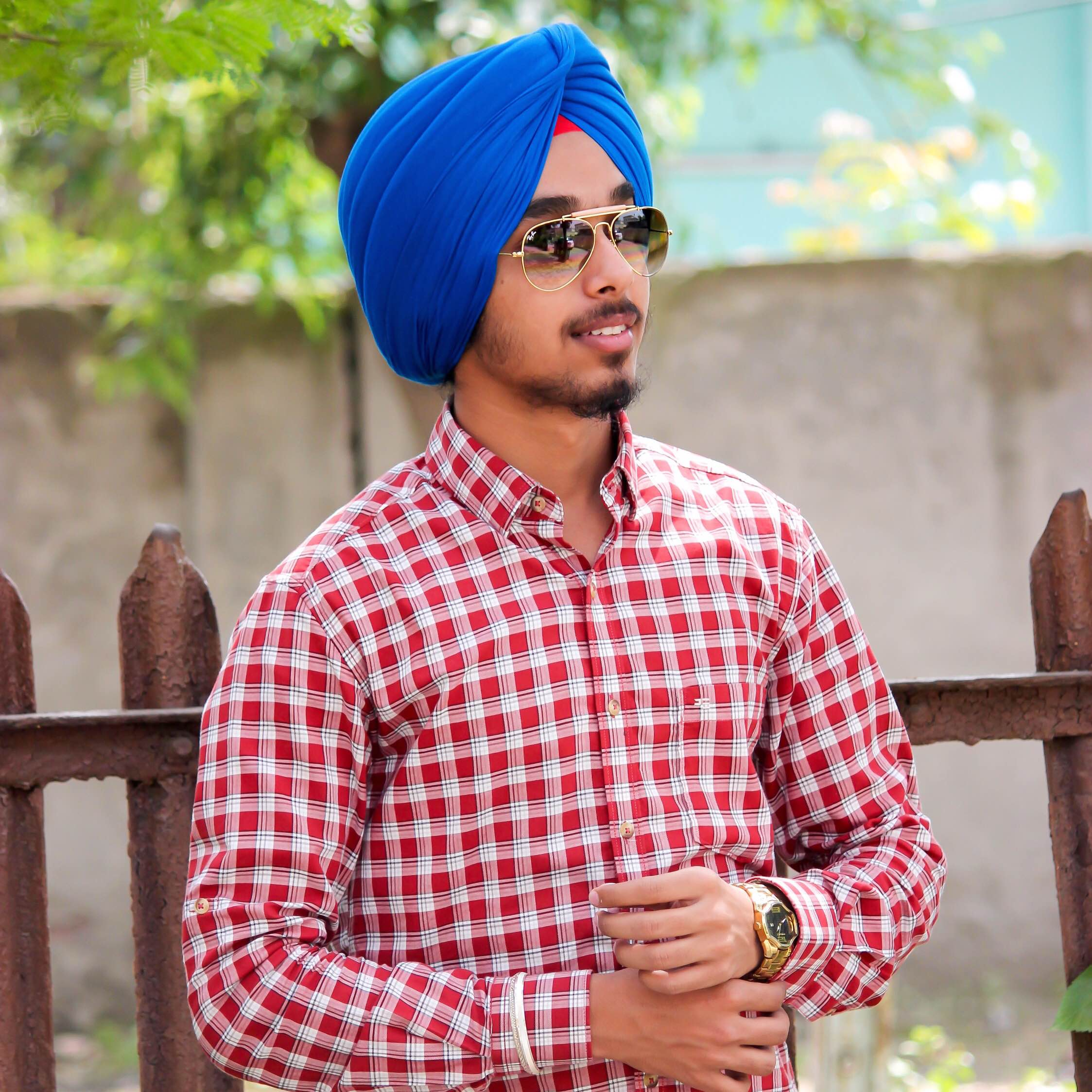
Patiala Shahi Turban

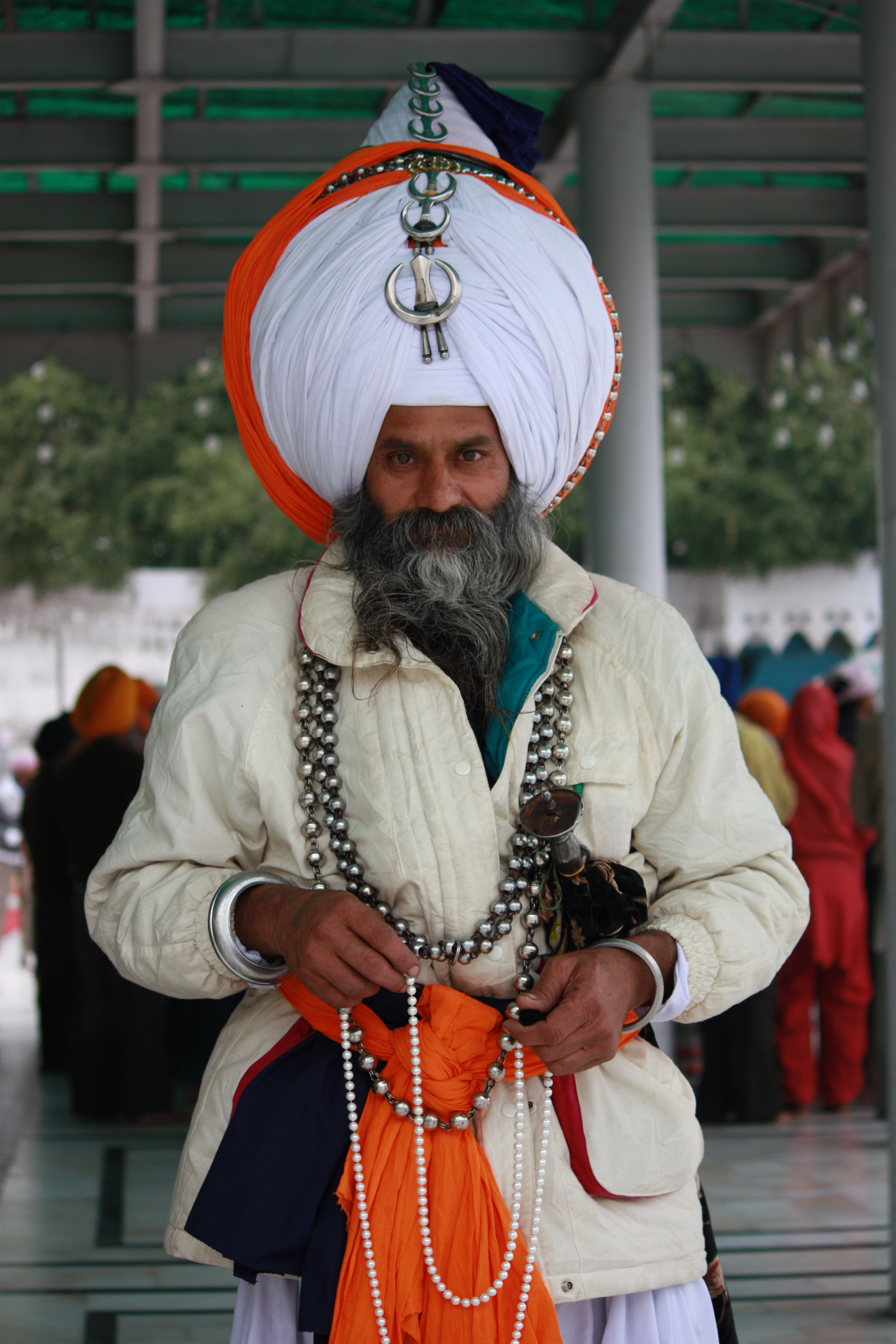
An Akali Singh wearing many Aad Chands in Amritsar and holding prayer beads

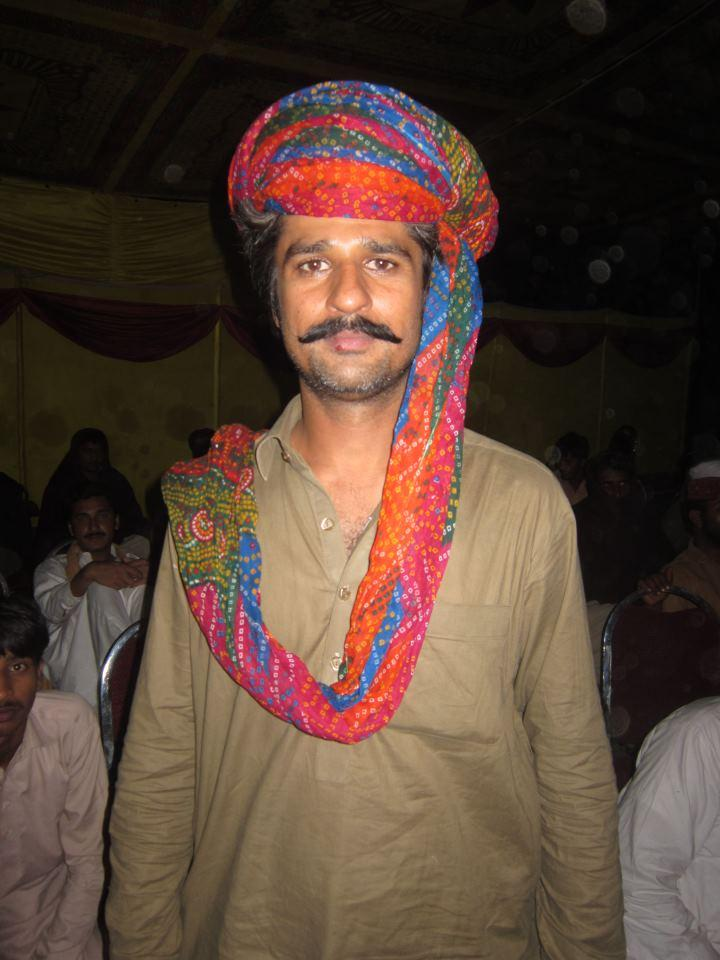
Chunri Turban in Punjab, Pakistan

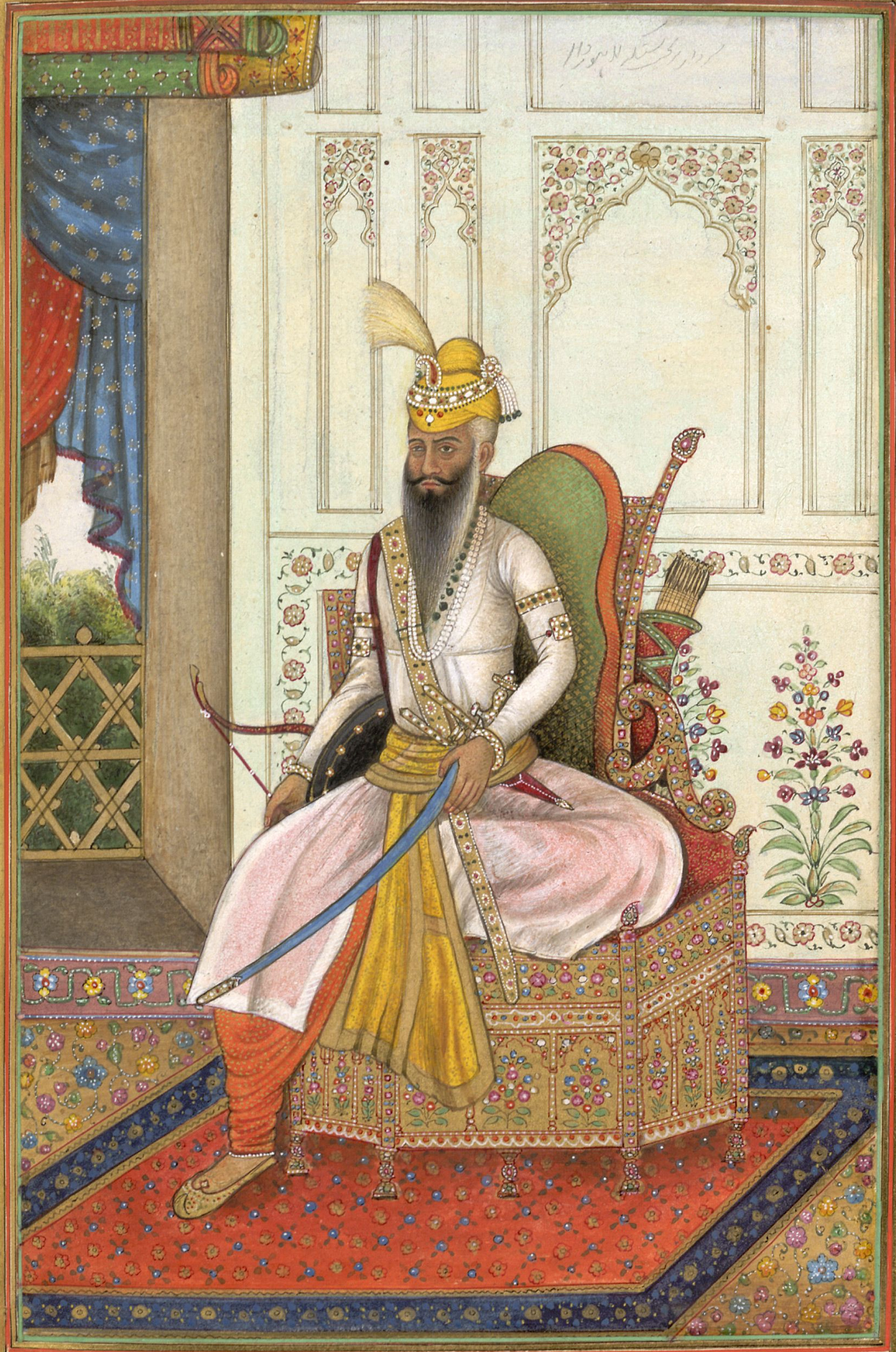
Maharaja Ranjit Singh's Turban

== Kalgi ==
Kalgi is a sign of royalty that is placed on the turban, in place of a jeweled crown.

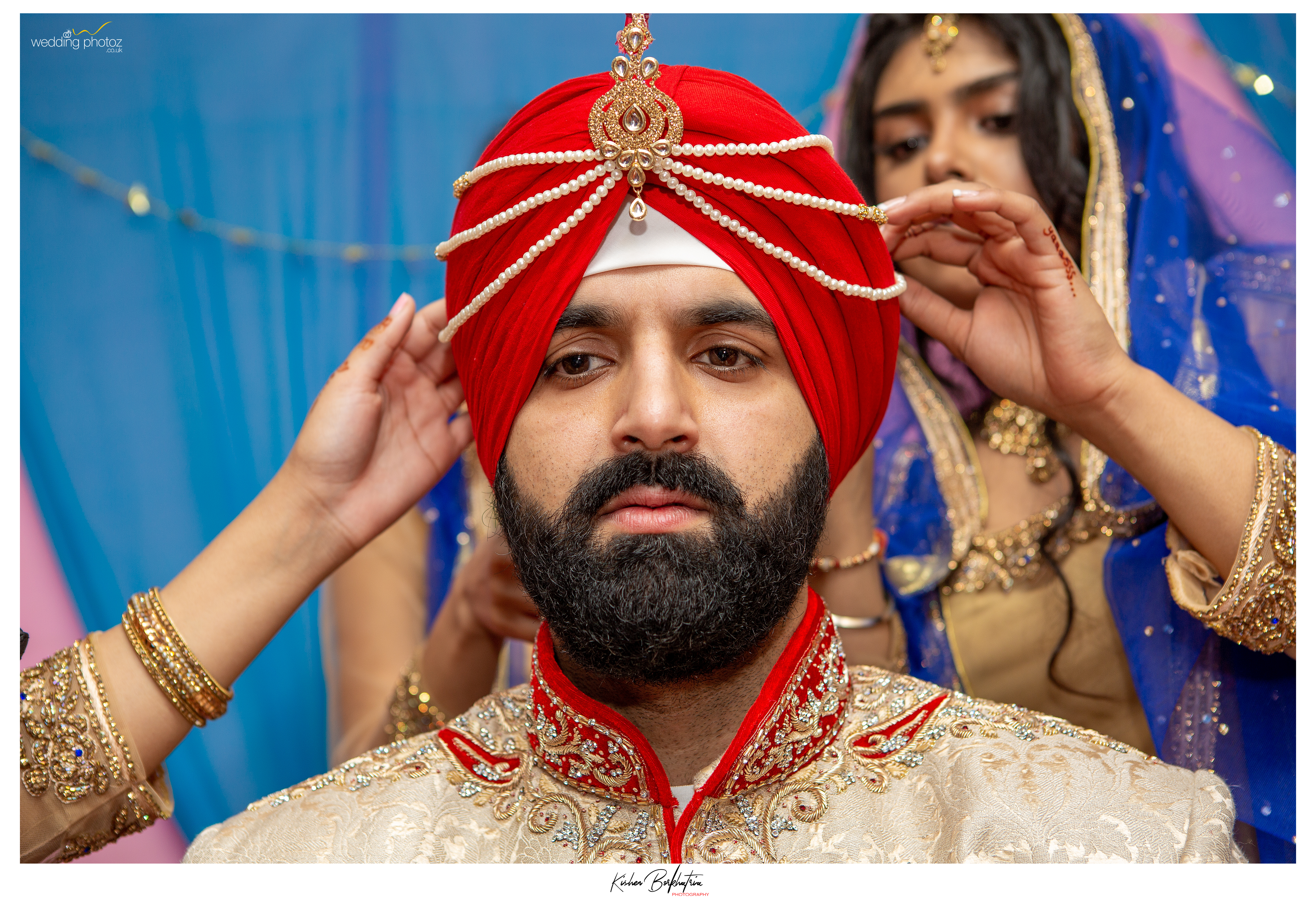
Kalgi placed on groom's turban

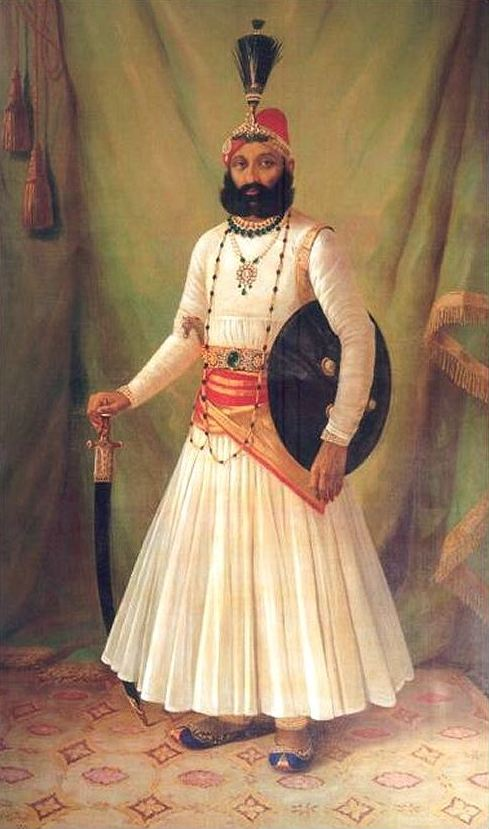
Kalgi on Maharaja Fateh Singh's turban

== Khes ==
Khes is a stout damask cloth used for winter wraps, generally weaved with coarse yarns made of cotton. It is a simple clothing item to wear loosely. Khes is a comfort object used in bedding and also as like a shawl- wrap by men in Punjab, India, and Pakistan to cover upper body parts. Khes was an important cloth of Punjab province.

== Loyi ==
The Loyi is a lightweight fabric draped by men and women to preserve heat in cool/chilly environments. It is often worn with other Punjabi wear.

== Paranda ==
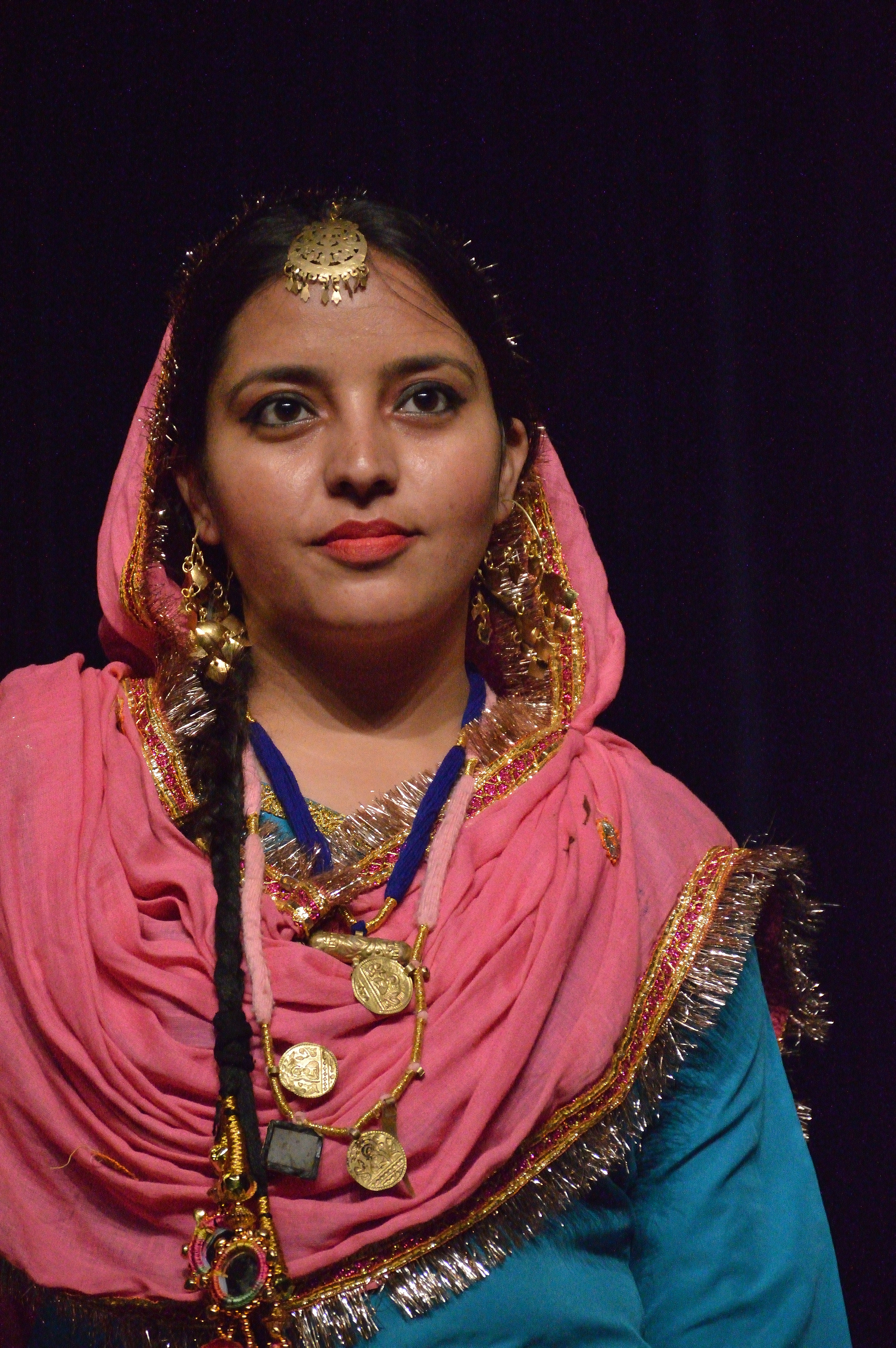
Punjabi girl wearing Paranda in her hairs

Paranda or parandi is hair accessory worn by women in Punjab.

== Saluka ==
The saluka is a tight fitting waistcoat which was worn in Sindh and the Punjab region. It is also worn in Uttar Pradesh.

== See also ==
- Áo dài
- Kurta
- Shalwar
- Jammu dress
- Afghan clothing
- Balochi clothing
- Khyber Pakhtunkhwa clothing
- Pakistani clothing
- Sindhi clothing
- Clothing in India
