= Khyber Pakhtunkhwa clothing =

Traditional clothing worn in Khyber Pakhtunkhwa, Pakistan

The traditional clothing and accessories worn in the Pakistani province of Khyber Pakhtunkhwa varies with the region.

== Khat partug ==
The traditional clothing for the lower region is the khat partug which is a shalwar kameez combination and is worn by men and women. The khat (also called khattaki or in Marwat Pashtu, kamis) is the shirt which fits closely to the body to the waist and then flares out, either to the knees, or in the case of women, to the ankles. The khat worn by women can be elaborately embroidered at the neck with needle work.

The partug (also called pardig) is a loose shalwar which has many folds and is loosely brought together at the ankles. Men also wear a turban and a scarf (called patkai), while women wear a head scarf.

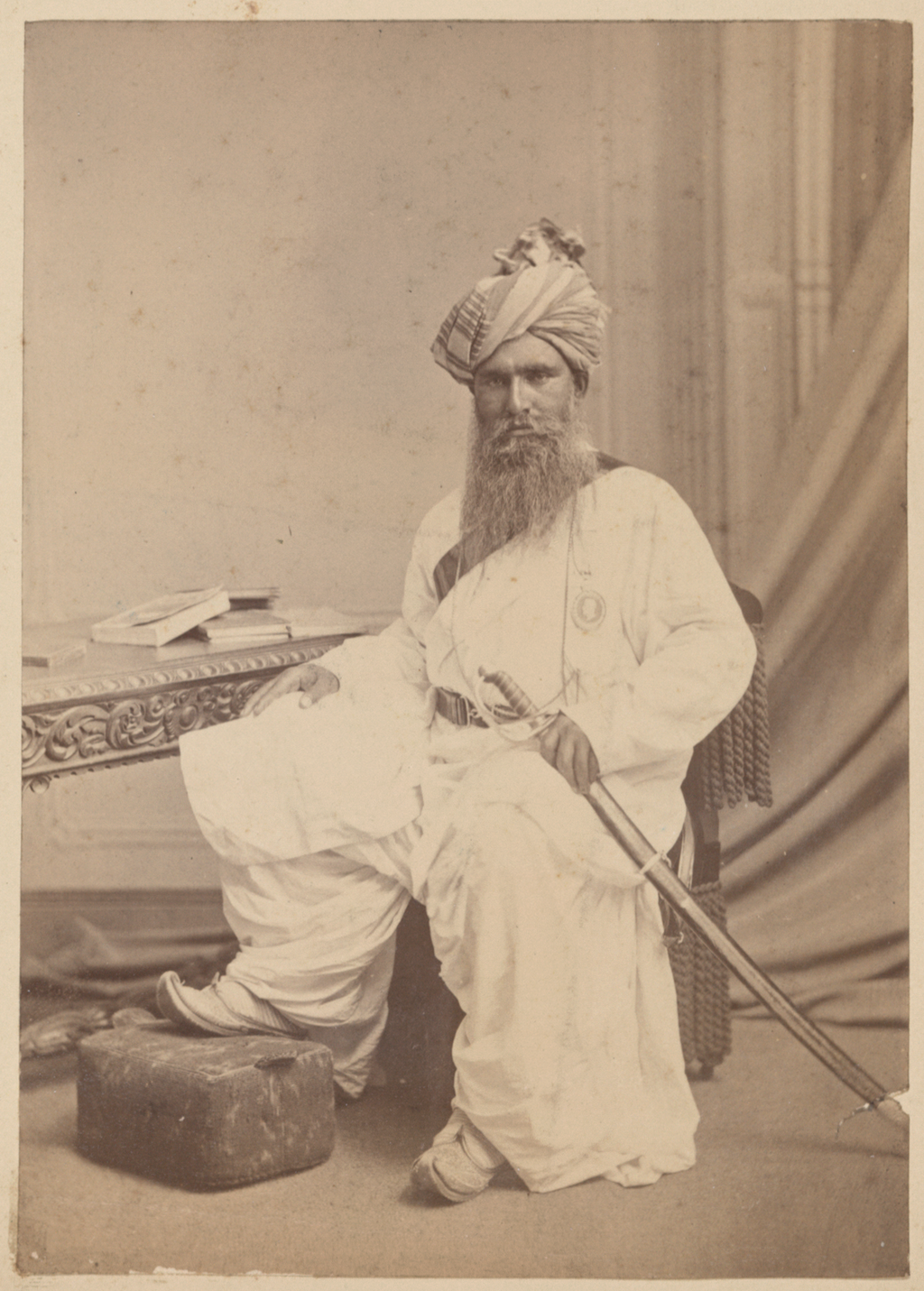
Traditional Khet partug. (Traditional loose shalwar worn in Khyber Pakhtunkhwa) (1842)

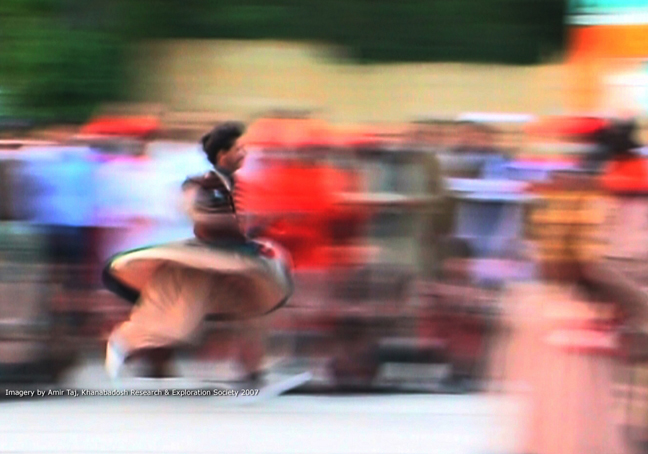
Khattak dancer wearing khat partug

== Firaq partug ==
The female khat is also known as the firaq which forms the firaq partug outfit. The female khat is of two types: the jalana khat and the giradana khat. The jalana khat is worn by unmarried women which is loose and traditionally of print design. The giradana khat is worn by married women and is of dark colours, especially red. The female khat has many pleats. The styles are of the type also worn in Afghanistan.

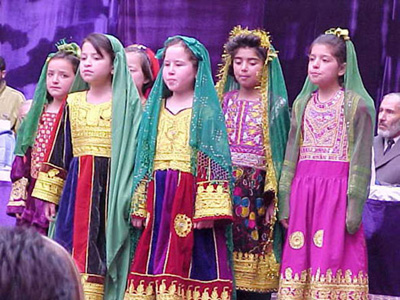
Afghan girls in traditional clothes

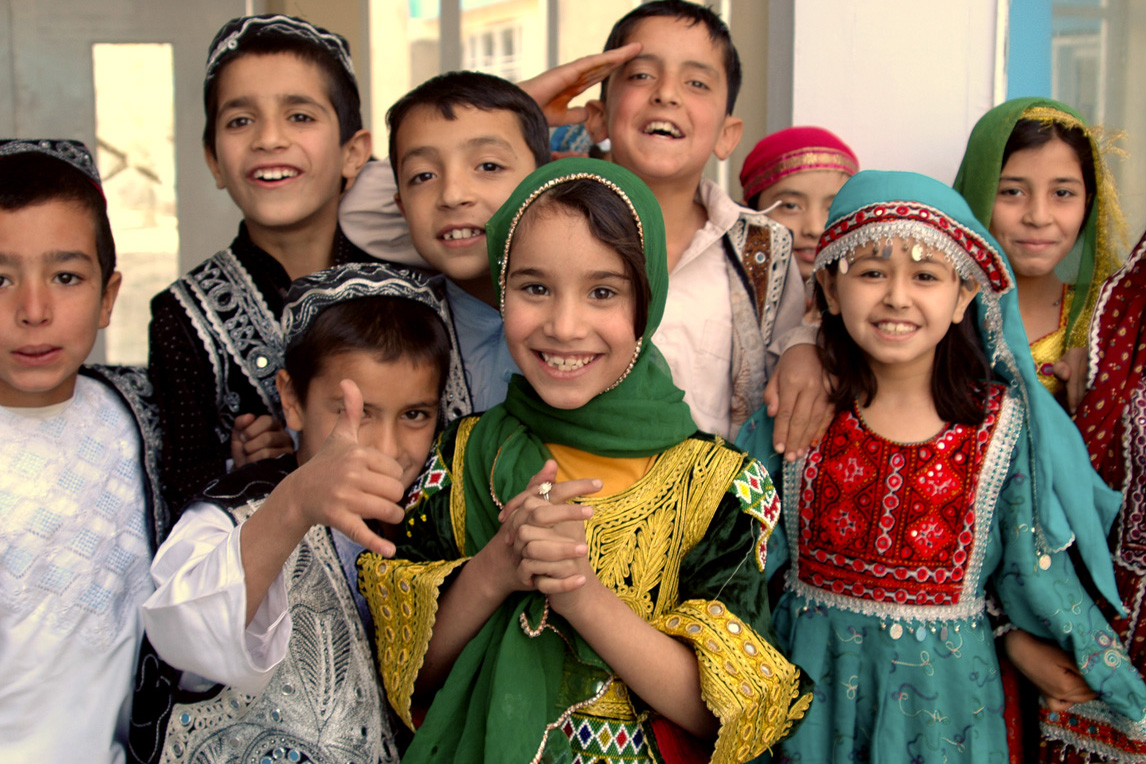
Afghan School children in Kabul

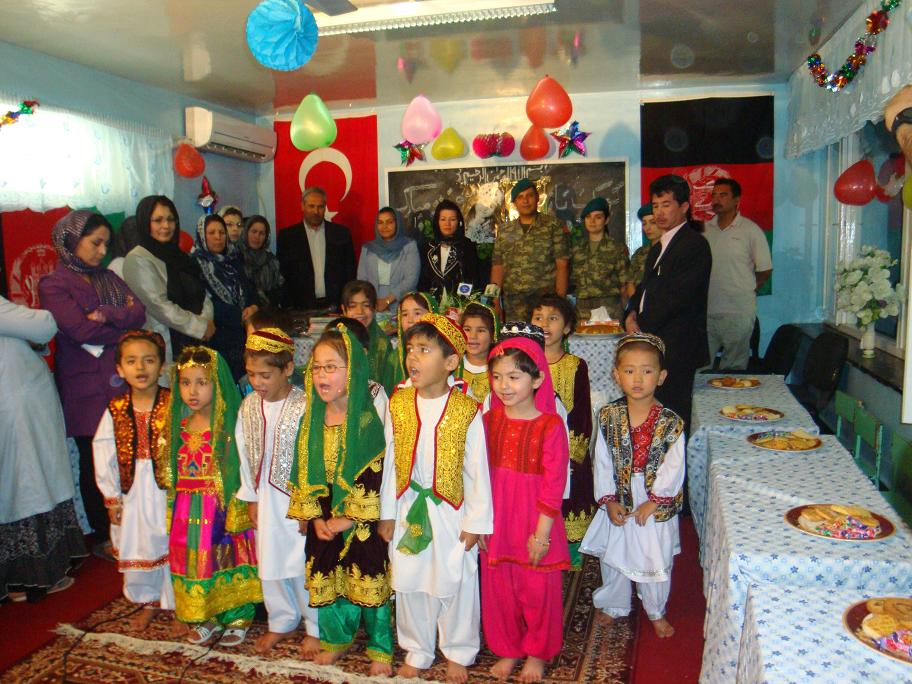
2010 Children's Day in Afghanistan

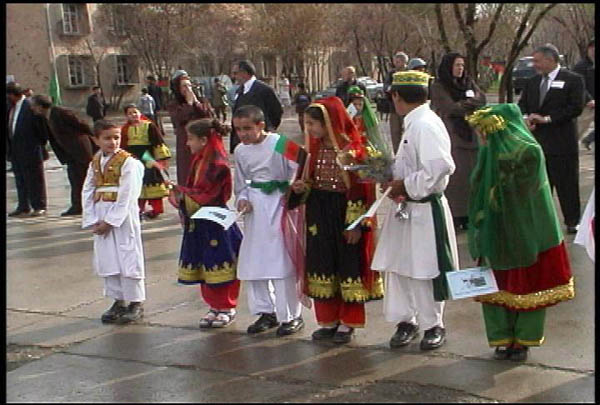
Afghan kids wearing traditional clothes in Kabul

Child of Khyber Pakhtunkhwa. 1920 approx.

== Perahan tunban/Partoog Kameez ==
Perahan tunban or Partoog Kameez is male dress worn in Khyber Pakhtunkhwa and eastern Afghanistan. The perahan tunban/Kameez Partoog version of the shalwar kameez is made up of the perahan/Kameez (the top) which is wide and loose with the sleeves also worn loose and pendent from the arms. The perahan/kameez worn in Khyber Pakhtunkhwa generally falls to the knees. The traditional perahan buttons on either shoulder, is collarless and is meant to be loose. Further, the traditional perahan/kameez is wide but fits closer to the body down to the waist and then is loose and full down to the knees (thereby flaring out). However, modern versions open to the front.

The tunban/partoog (lower garment) is worn loose and hanging. Some versions of the tunban/partoog have the ample folds gathered into plaits at the lower part of the legs, below the knees to the ankles and the loose part above overhangs in loops. The tunban/partoog therefore uses a lot of material so that it gathers around the waist and folds around the legs. Modern versions are less voluminous.

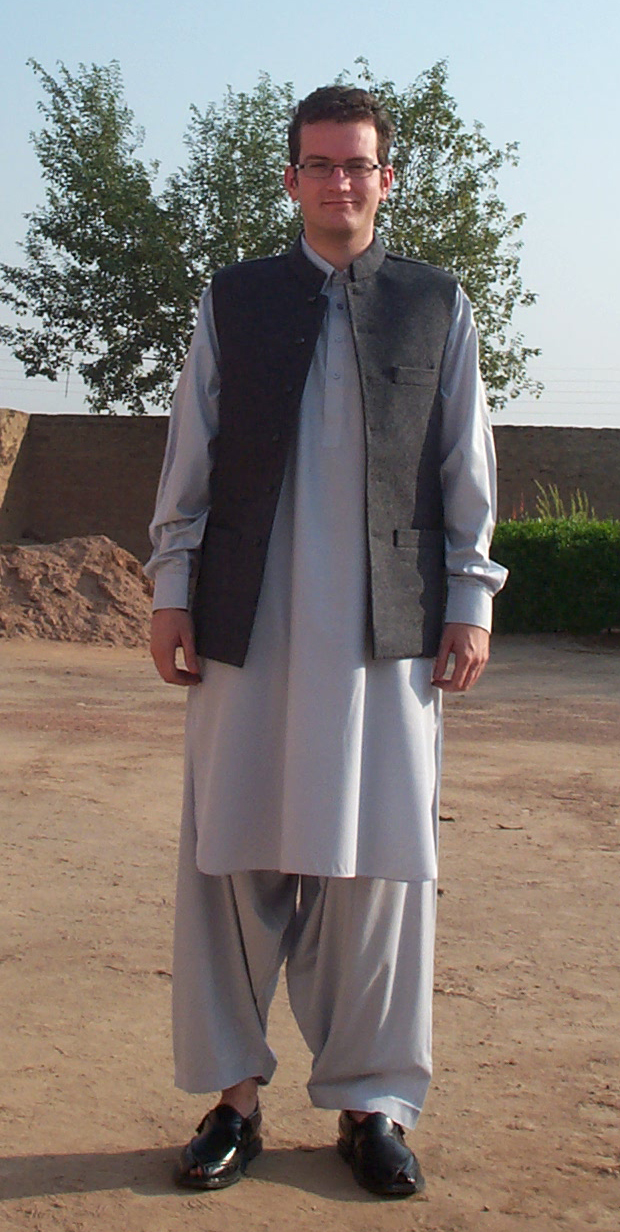
Clothing worn by most Pashtun males in Afghanistan and Pakistan

== Sindhi cap ==
Although the Sindhi cap originates from Sindh, the cap is popular in Khyber Pakhtunkhwa.

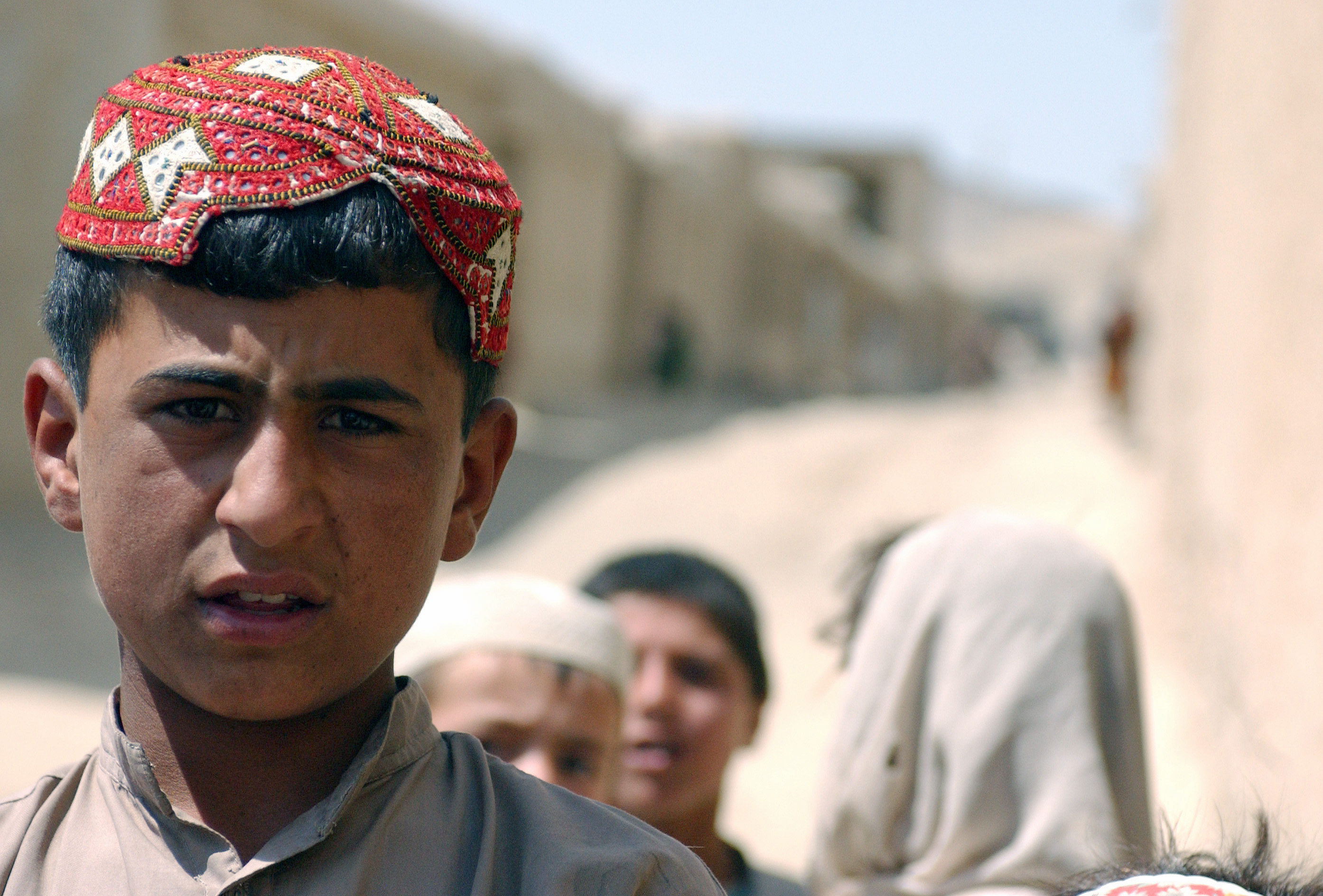
The Sindhi cap

== Peshawari kullah cap ==
The Peshawari cap, called kullah, is a skull cap which is quilted in cotton or silk and embroidered in local designs.

== Peshawar shalwar ==
The traditional dress of Peshawar and other parts of Khyber Pakhtunkhwa, Pakistan is the khalqa (gown) which opens at the front or shirt which does not open at the front, and the Peshawari shalwar which is very loose down to the ankles.

== Choga ==
The choga is an outer robe with sleeves. It is generally made of soft woollen material. The choga is traditionally worn in Afghanistan and Khyber Pakhtunkhwa.

The shaturi choga is made of camel's hair. The baruki choga is made with wool of rufus-woolled sheep and the kurki choga is made with highland goat's wool. Other expensive chogas are made with coarse materials.

The Kabuli pashum is the choga made with the fleece of dumba, fat-tailed sheep of Peshawar and Kabul. The fleece produces fine quality material.

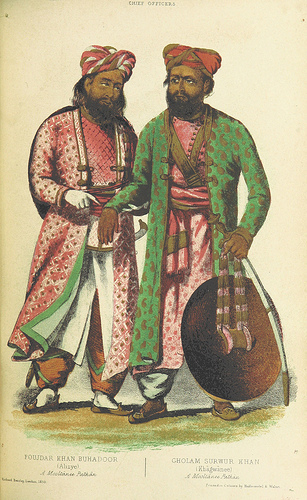
Pashtun dress 1851

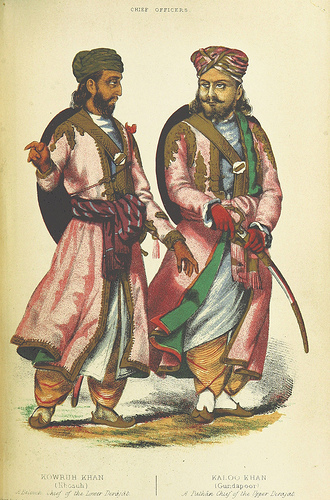
Derajat Pashtuns 1851

== Sharai ==
The sharai is a woollen sheet which has a slit in it for the head. The sheet is long and is tied around the waist with a belt. The sharai can also be short and worn with a kammarband (waist band) made of coarse material or leather.

== Turban ==
The turban is known as the dastar which can be voluminous and long.

== Chitral ==
The dress in Kalash, Chitral District is the long robe. The robe can either be of wool or cotton, and is referred to as the chugha or shoqa. This type of robe is also traditionally worn in the neighbouring Hunza Valley of Gilgit-Baltistan where the garment is referred to as the choga.

In Chitral, the men traditionally wear mid-calf-length straight-legged loose woollen trousers which are supplemented by woollen leggings in winter. This links the region to the Nuristani region in adjoining Afghanistan to its west where men traditionally wore white woollen trousers reaching to just below the knees, supplemented by black tight leggings, covered by a long tunic tied at the waist. Men of Chitral also wear loose shirts and woollen waistcoats or coats and the Chitrali cap with a sprig of juniper tucked into its brim.

The women wear very loose shalwars. Women's dresses are made with eight to ten yards of black cotton cloth, which is heavily embroidered around the neck, sleeves and bottom with skeins of yarn. A thick woollen or yarn belt is tied three or four times around the waist. Women wear beads around the neck. The headdress consists of two parts, the smaller susutr (woven woollen circle) which rest at the back of the head and has a long run down the back. The larger item is the kapas which rests above the susutr. Where the susutr is worn at all times, the kapas, which is highly decorated is worn on special occasions, or when visiting other valleys.

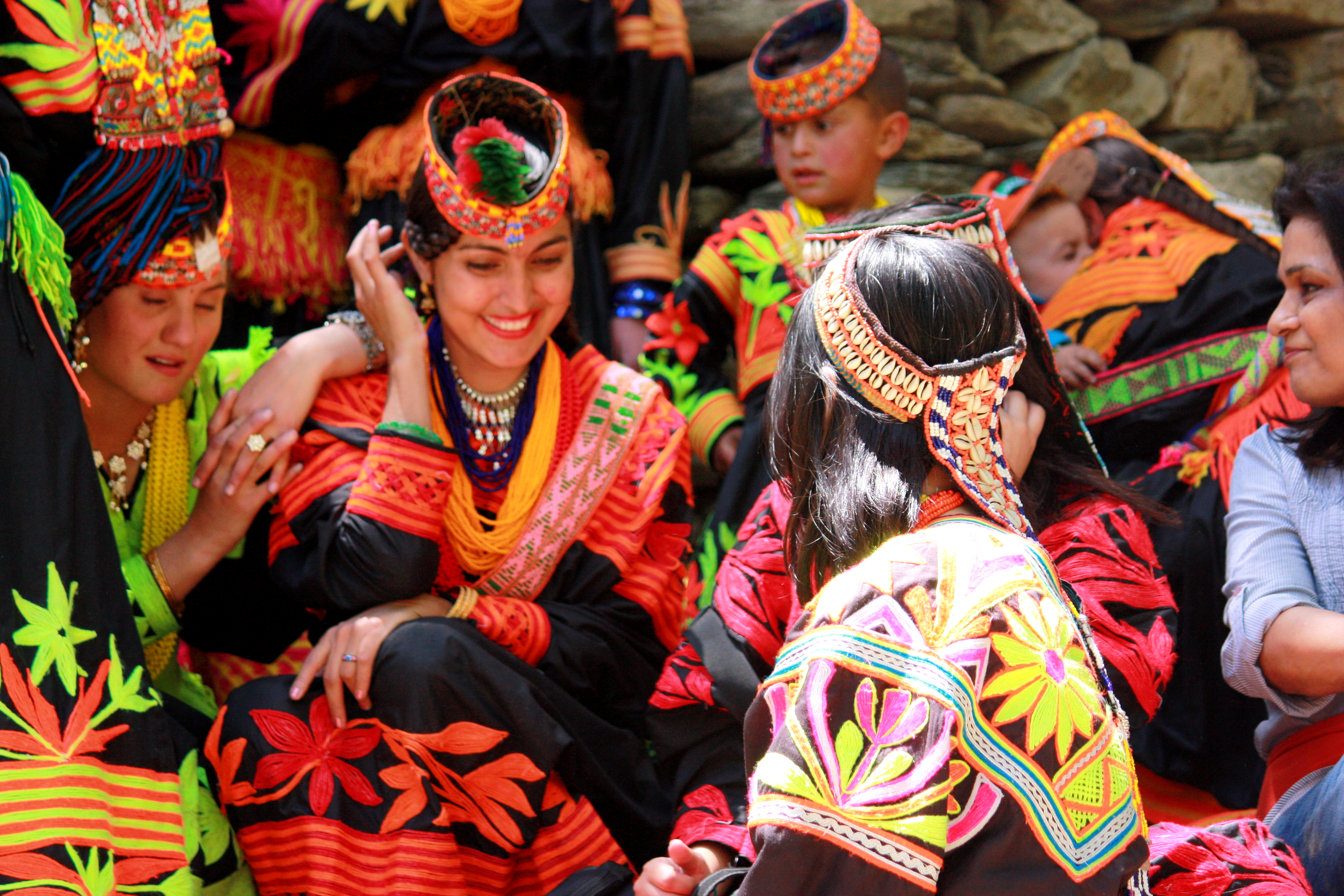
Kalash women traditional clothing

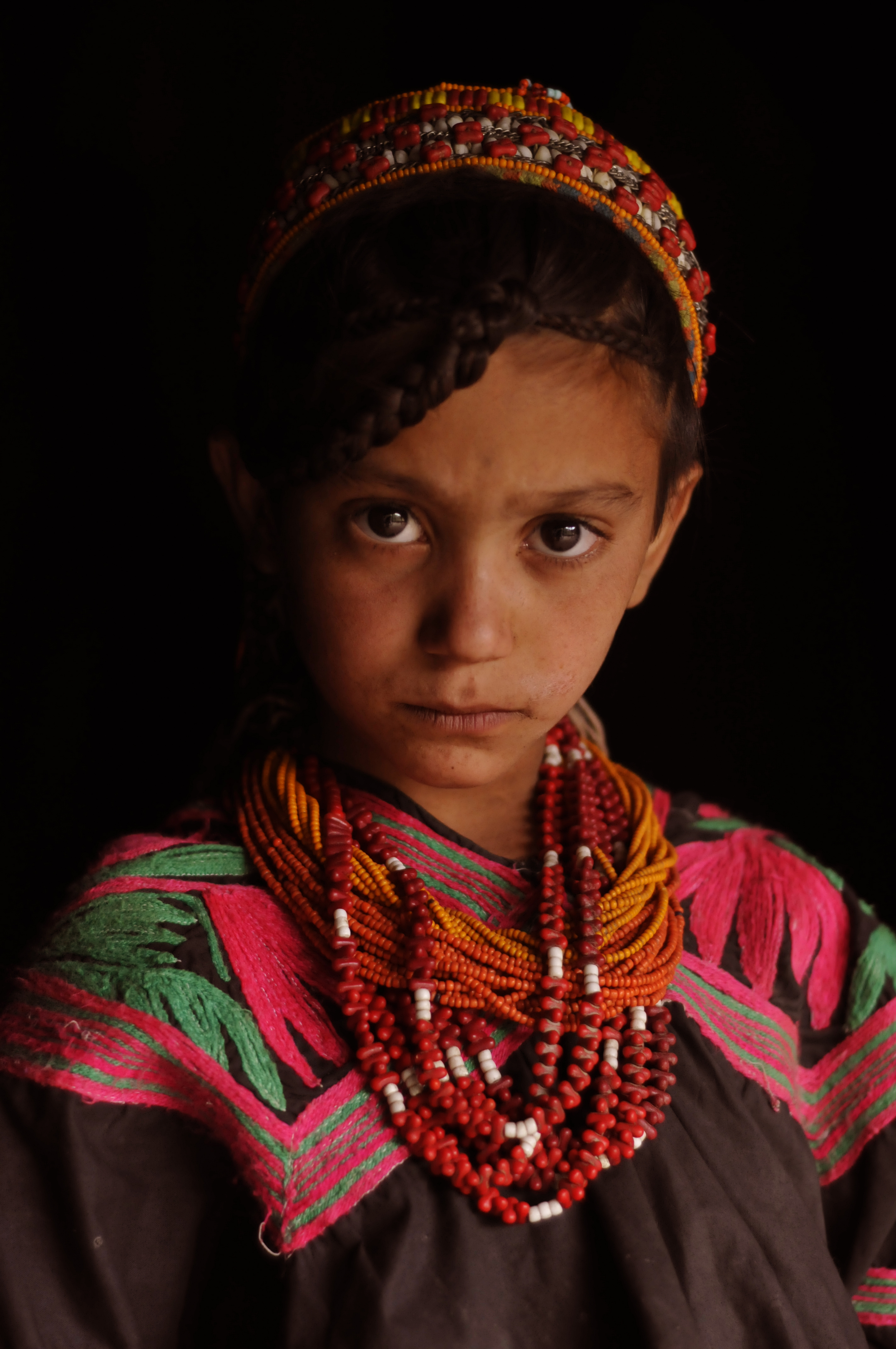
Kalash girl

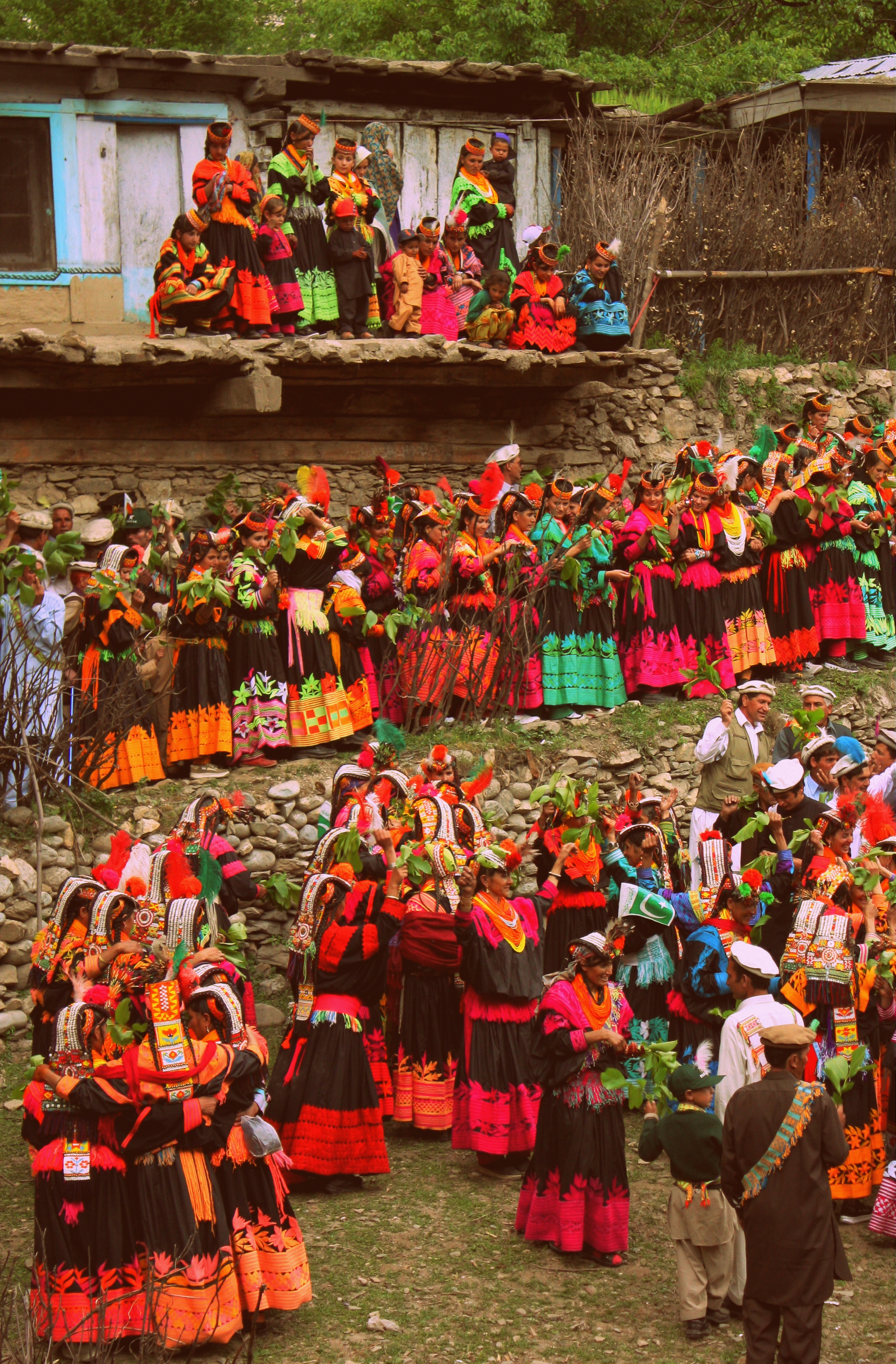
Celebrating Joshi, Kalash women and men dance and sing their way from the dancing ground to the village arena, the Charso, for the end of the day's festivities.

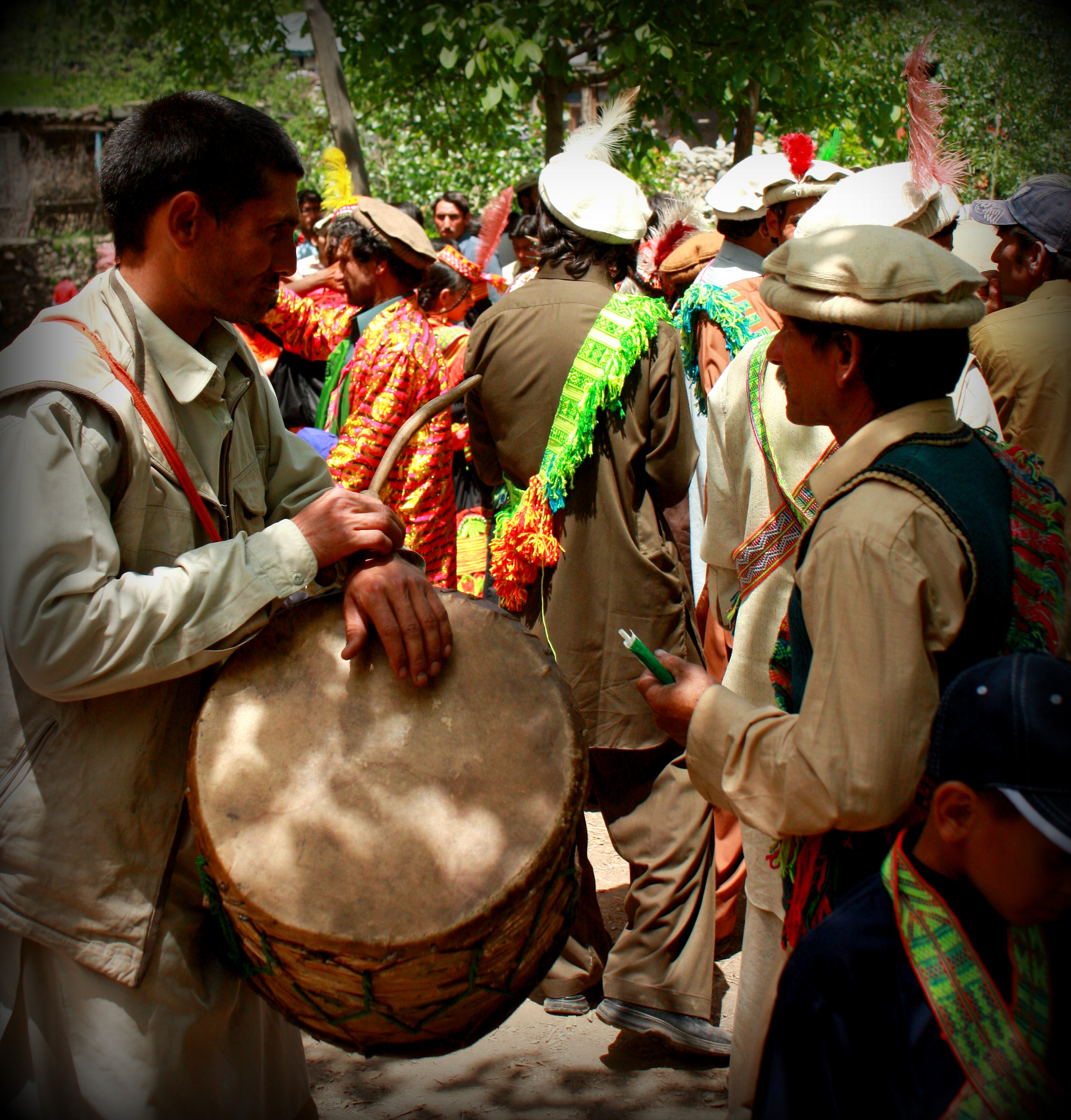
A drummer during the Joshi festival in Bumberet, Pakistan. Drumming is a male occupation among the Kalash people.

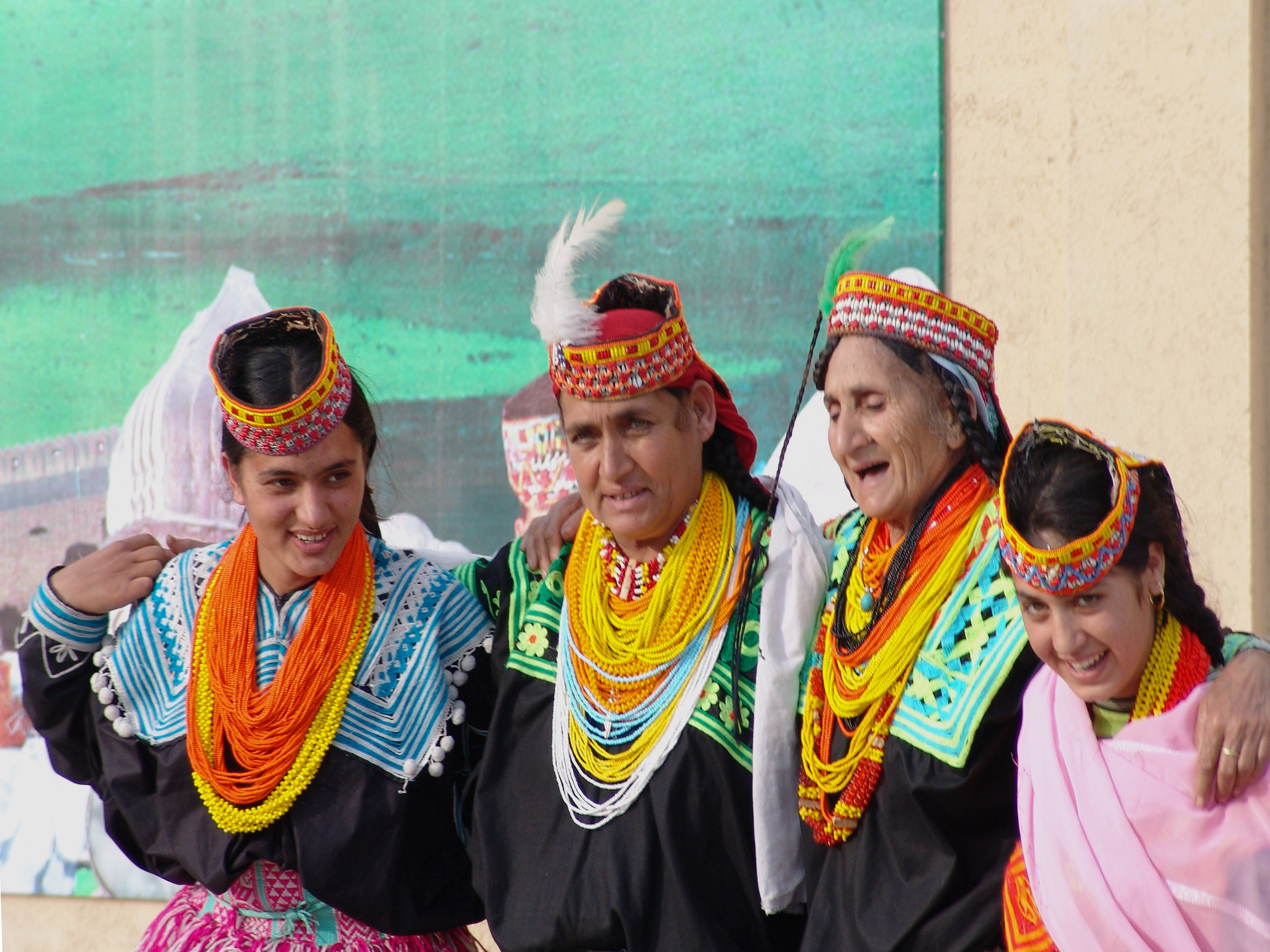
Kalasha women

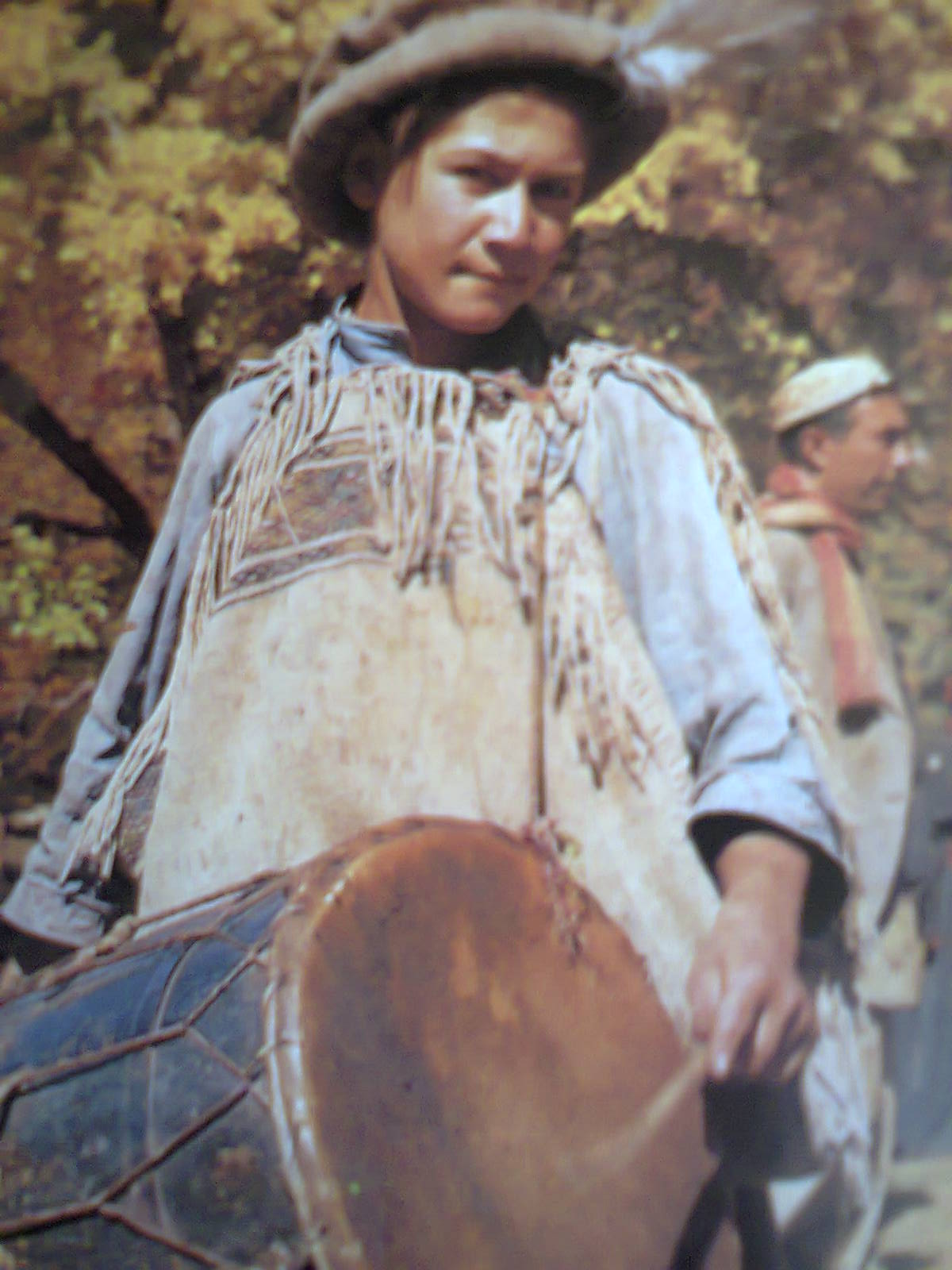
Drummer boy Chitral

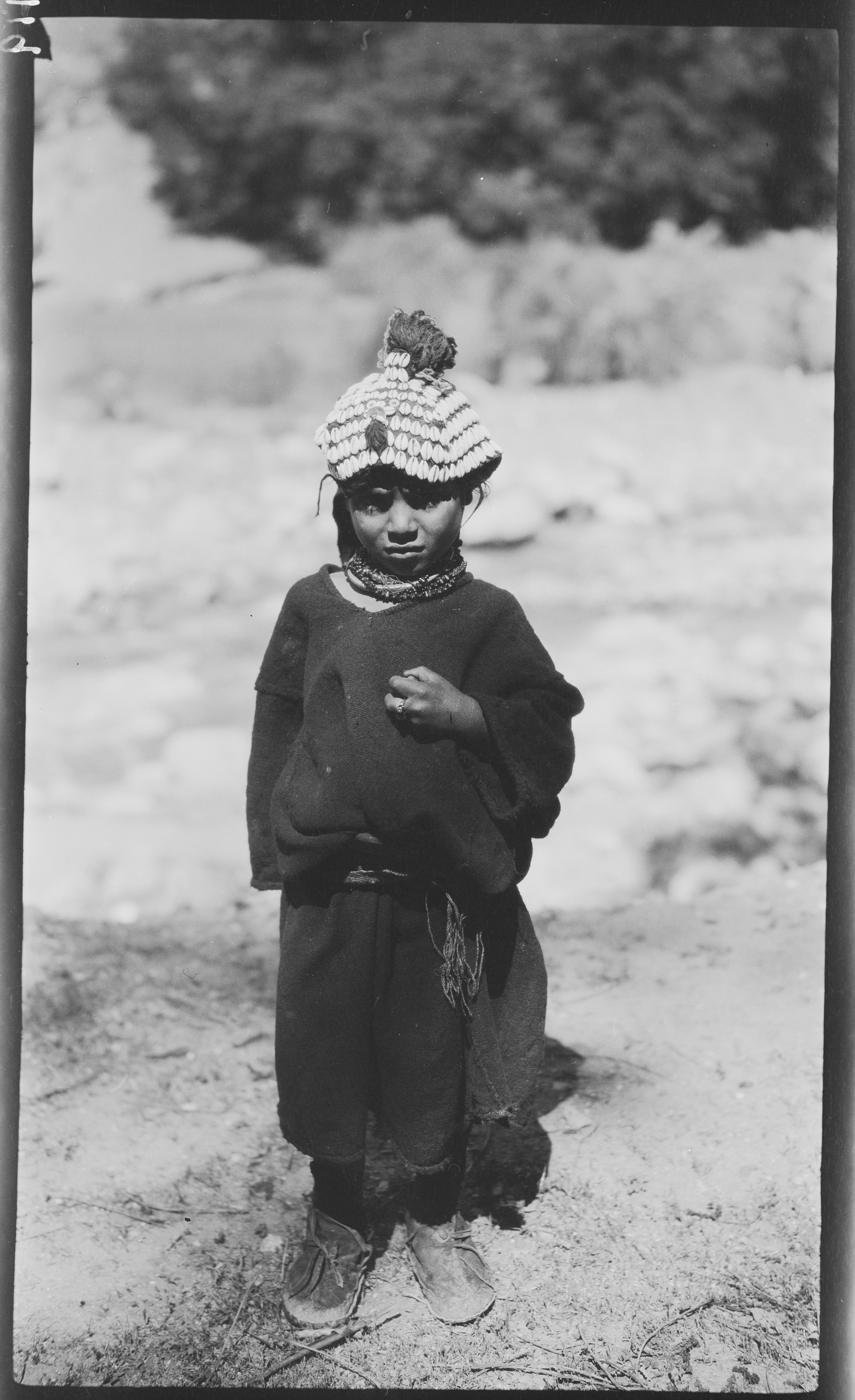
Rumbur Valley, Chitral, NWFP, Pakistan Kalash girl in Rumbur. The girl is dressed in a dark gown and carries jewellery: a ring, a necklace and a headdress (kupa) covered with shells (kauri or cowri). On top of the headdress there is a tassle (probably red) and a second one, smaller, is visible above her forehead. Her shoes are also clearly visible. 1929 approx.

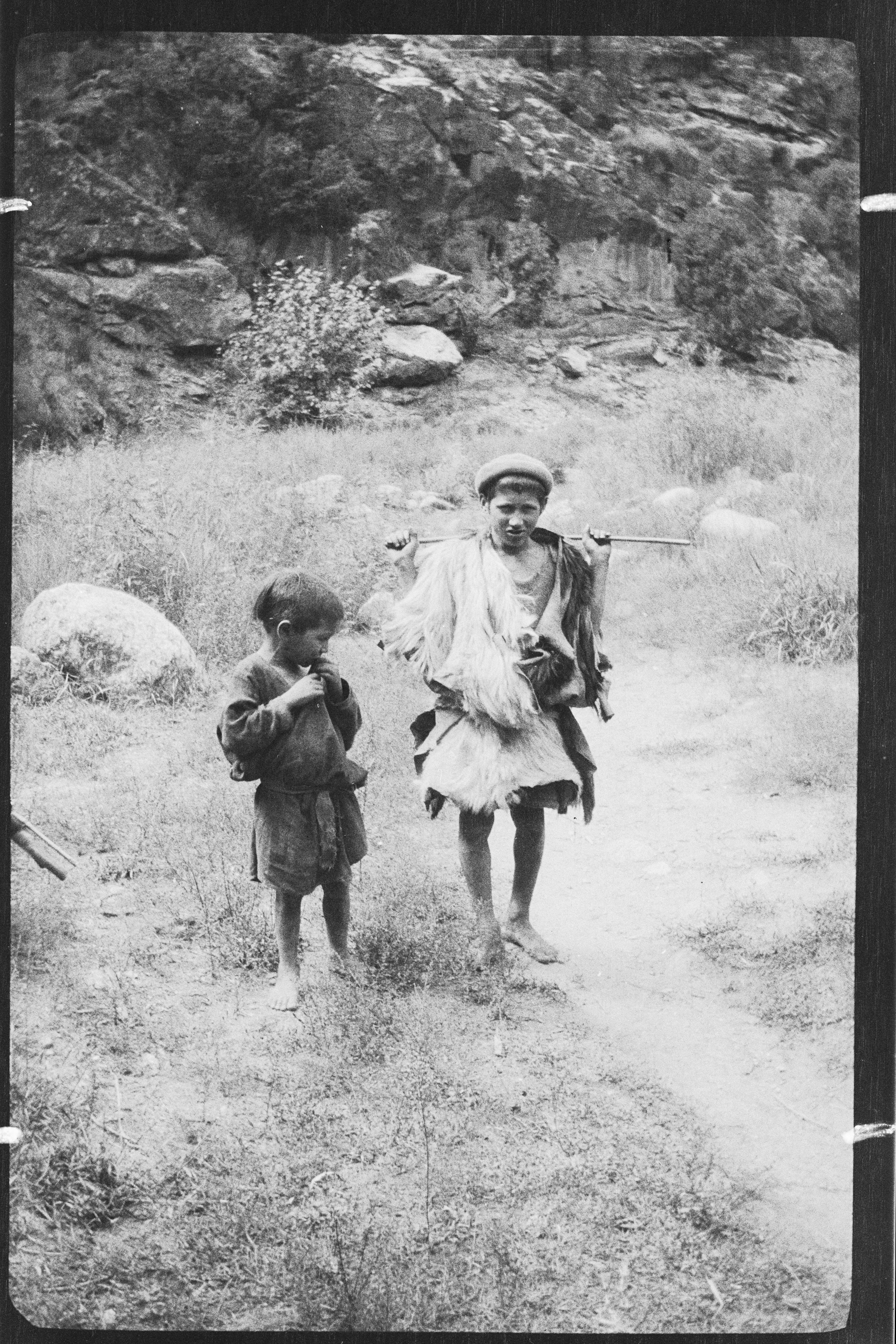
Urtsun (Utsun), Chitral, NWFP, Pakistan Kati boys, one dressed in a goat's skin with the typical Chitrali cap (pakol).

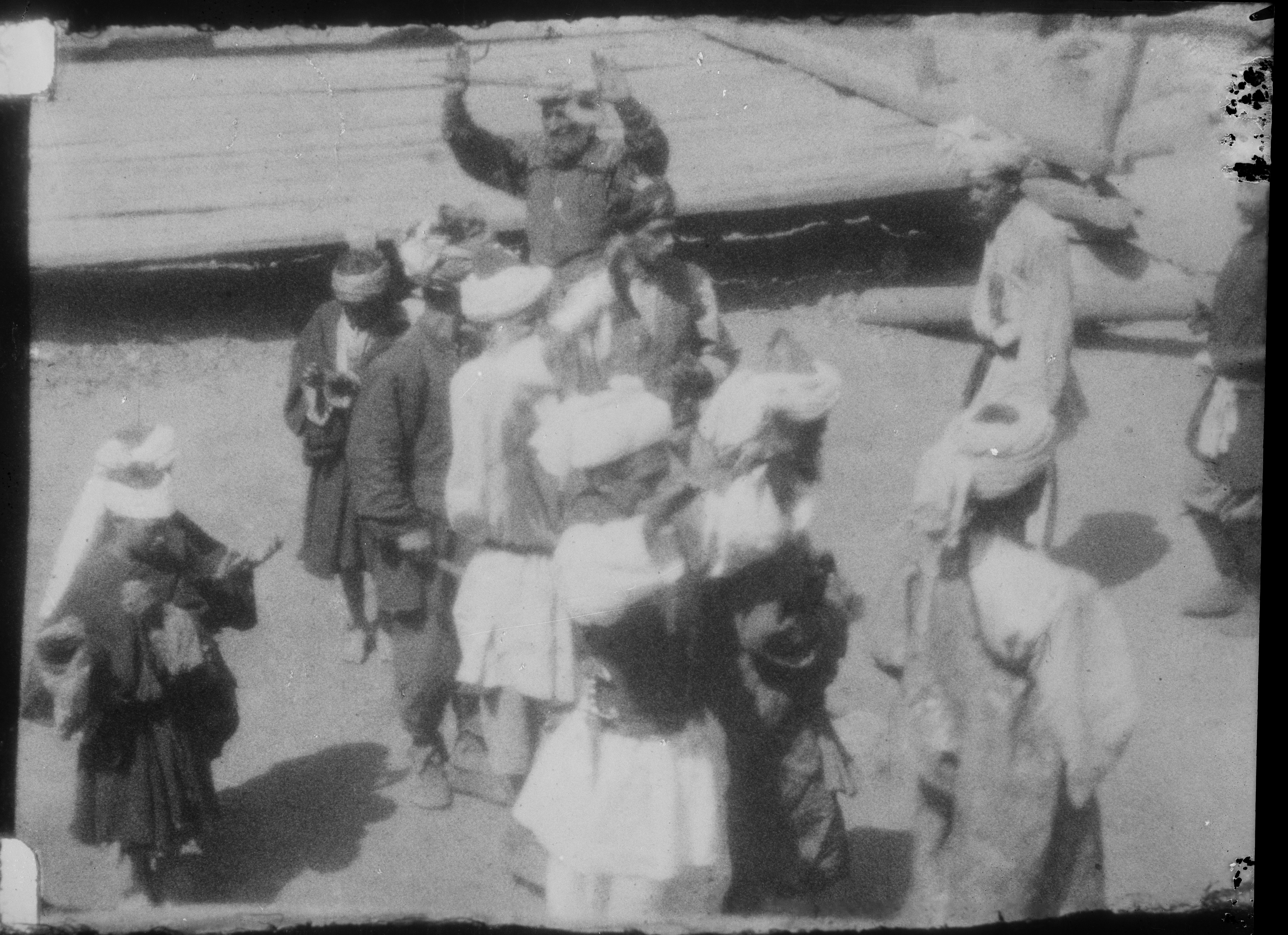
1929 approx. Kunisht (Rumbur Sheikhandeh), Rumbur Valley, Chitral, NWFP, Pakistan Photograph (nr. 1 of 3) reproduced from Georg Morgenstierne's unique film documentary from Chitral. Overview picture from the Kati dance. The male Kati dancers are dressed as usual for this occasion in their best clothes, silk costumes (talar) and turbans. The dance on the ground beside the dancing floor is called Zhige.

== Chitrali cap ==
The Chitrali cap is made of fulled woollen cloth, and consists of a flat crown with a rolled brim. The cap is also popular in Afghanistan where it forms part of Nuristani dress.

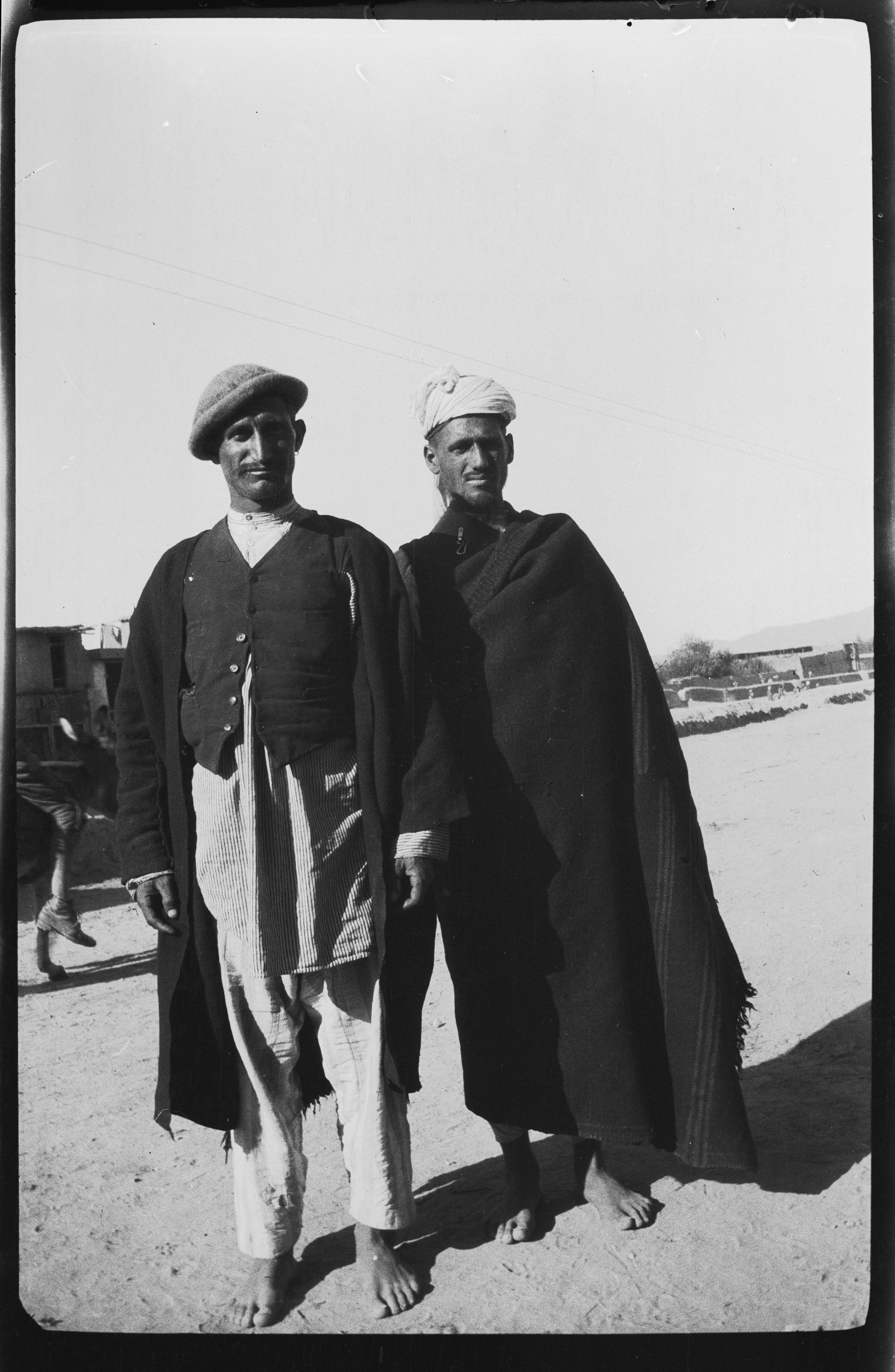
Nuristani people in Kabul, 1924

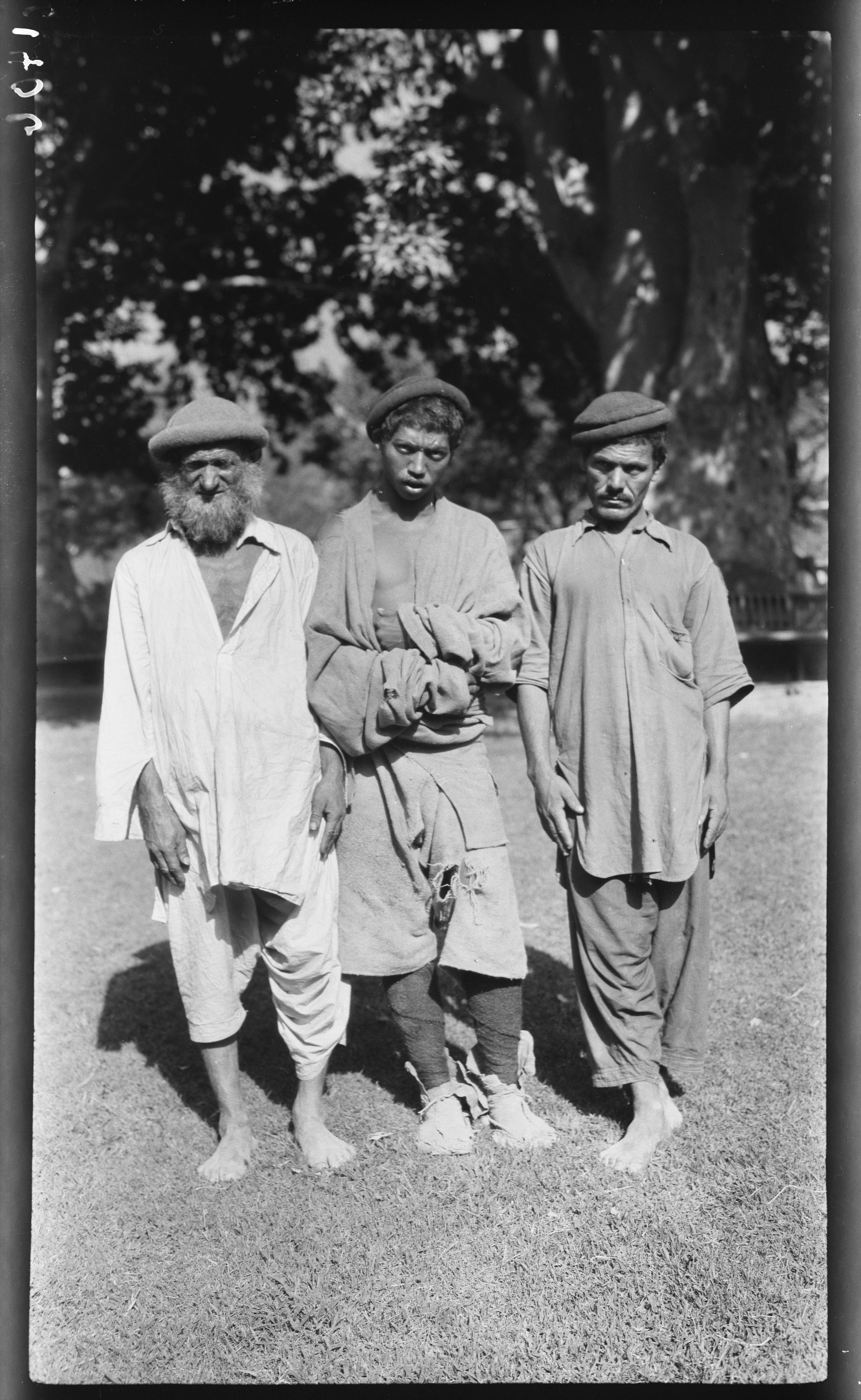
Kalash in Chitrali caps (early shapes of), 1929

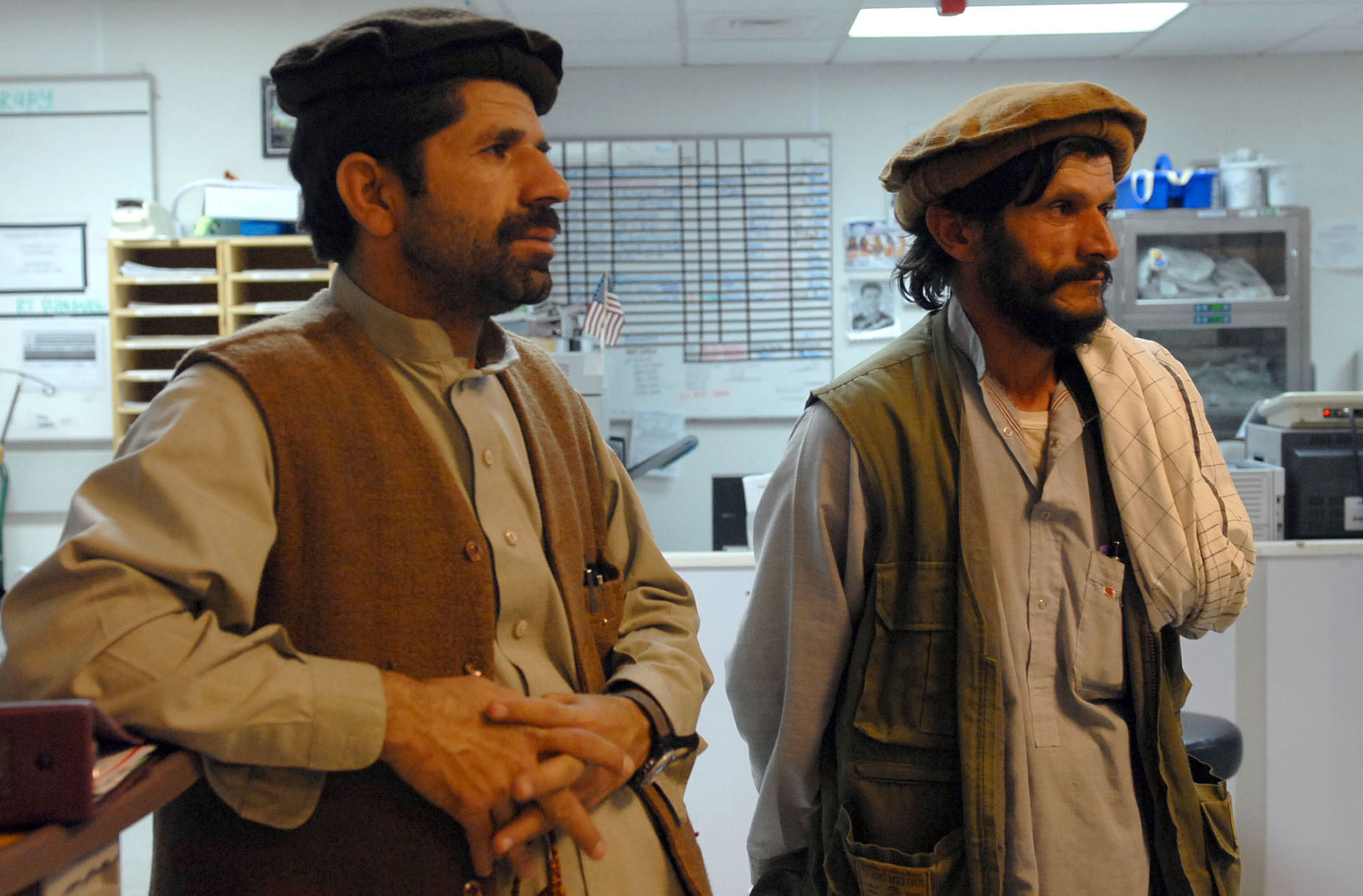
Tajiks of Kapisa at Bagram (Afghanistan), 2006

== Suthan ==
In Bannu and the Hazara area which includes, Mansehra, Abbottabad and Haripur District, the older traditional lower garment is the suthan as worn in the Punjab region. The suthan can either be loose to the knees and tight to the ankles, or loose to the lower legs and tight at the ankles. In Bannu, the suthan is traditionally worn with a khilka, a long tunic which does not have side slits. The choga is also worn, which can be knee length or lower and is the traditional dress in Afghanistan, Khyber Pakhtunkhwa and is also worn in the Punjab region.

In the plains of the Hazara region, the dress is of the type worn in the Punjab region: the long Punjabi kurta which has side slits is traditionally worn. The kurta is called khilka or perni. However, a knee length version is also worn in the lower area. The khilka/perni is worn with a loose Punjabi suthan which is tight at the ankles.

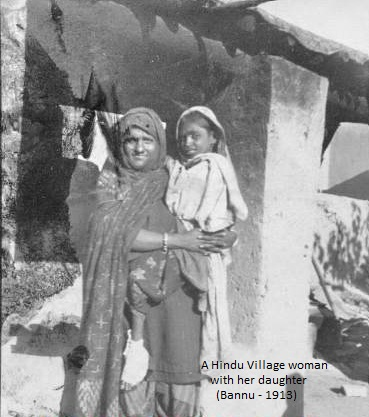
Bannu Woman and daughter 1913

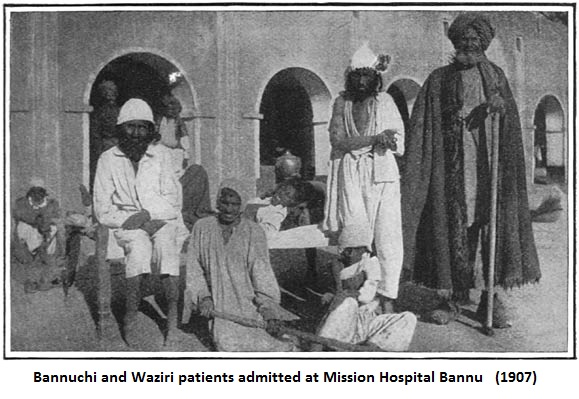
1907 Bannu

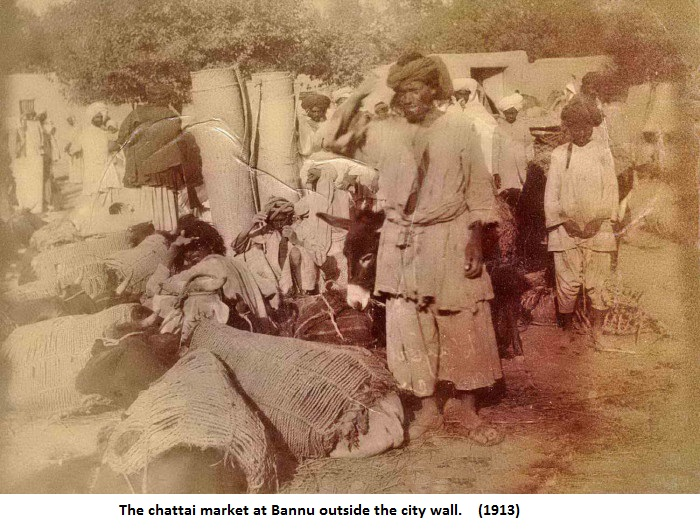
Mazeri-madi 1913

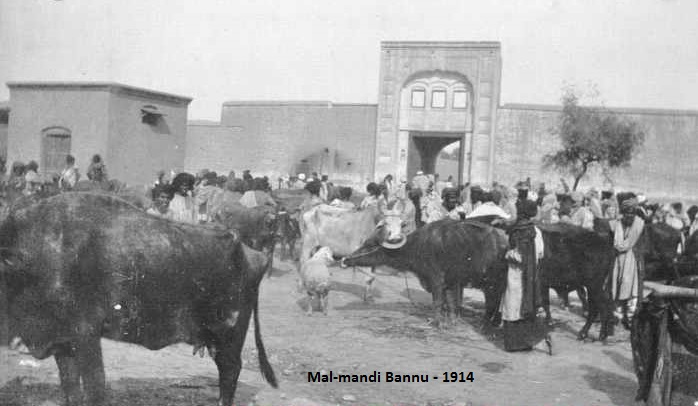
Mal Mandi Bannu -1914

== See also ==
- Khet partug
- Pashtun dress
- Perahan tunban
