= Khetpartug =

Traditional Afghan clothing worn by men in Afghanistan

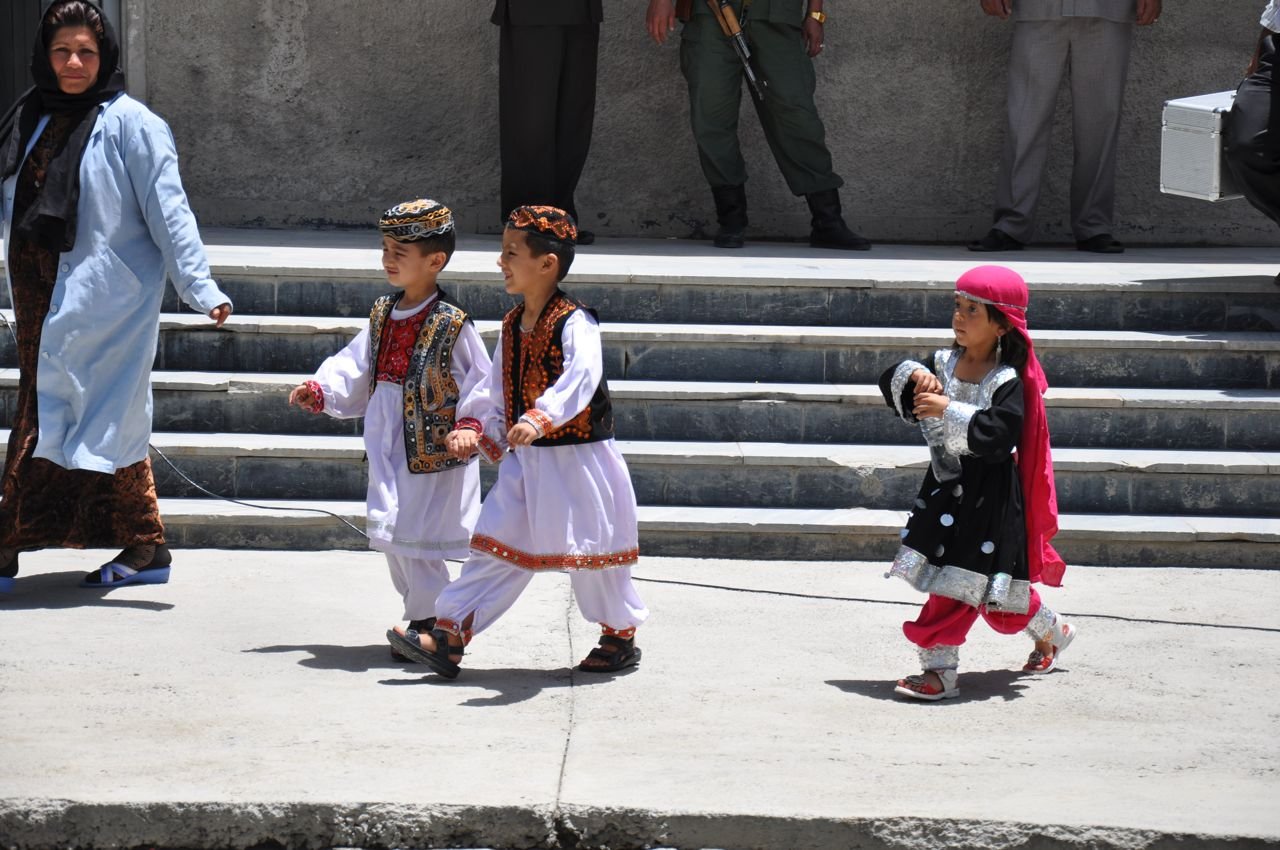
- Boys wearing khet partug
- Type: Dress
- Introduced: Historical

Khetpartug (Pashto: خت پړتوګ, khət paṛtūg) khat partoog, is a type of Pashtun clothing worn in Afghanistan.

== Origin ==
Khet partug traces its history back to the Kushan and The Parthian nobility, It is said that clans of the Parthians named Karl and Serb, likely The Pashtun Confederacies of Karlani and Sarbani wore this type of tunic and baggy pants. Kushans also wore similar clothing. It is likely that Pashtuns have always worn the khet partug in one design or another. Khet partug is the ancestor of the men's shalwar kameez ( Perahan Tunban or Kamees Partug ) worn in Afghanistan and Pakistan and is likely also the ancestor of the indic sherwani wedding dresses worn in Punjab and Sindh Parts of Pakistan, since the name sherwani derives from sarwani, which is itself mispronounced from sarbani.

== Design ==
=== Khet ===
The khet is the upper garment which is loose and slightly tightened at the waist and is more like a tunic or a robe, similar to a smock with wide sleeves and reaching below the knees. The khet does not traditionally have side slits, and is worn with a belt at the waist.

=== Partug ===
The partug is the lower garment which is very loose and full of pleats, with folds all around the waist and made of yards of material. Khet partug is also similar to the costume worn by men dancing the attan.

== Photo gallery ==
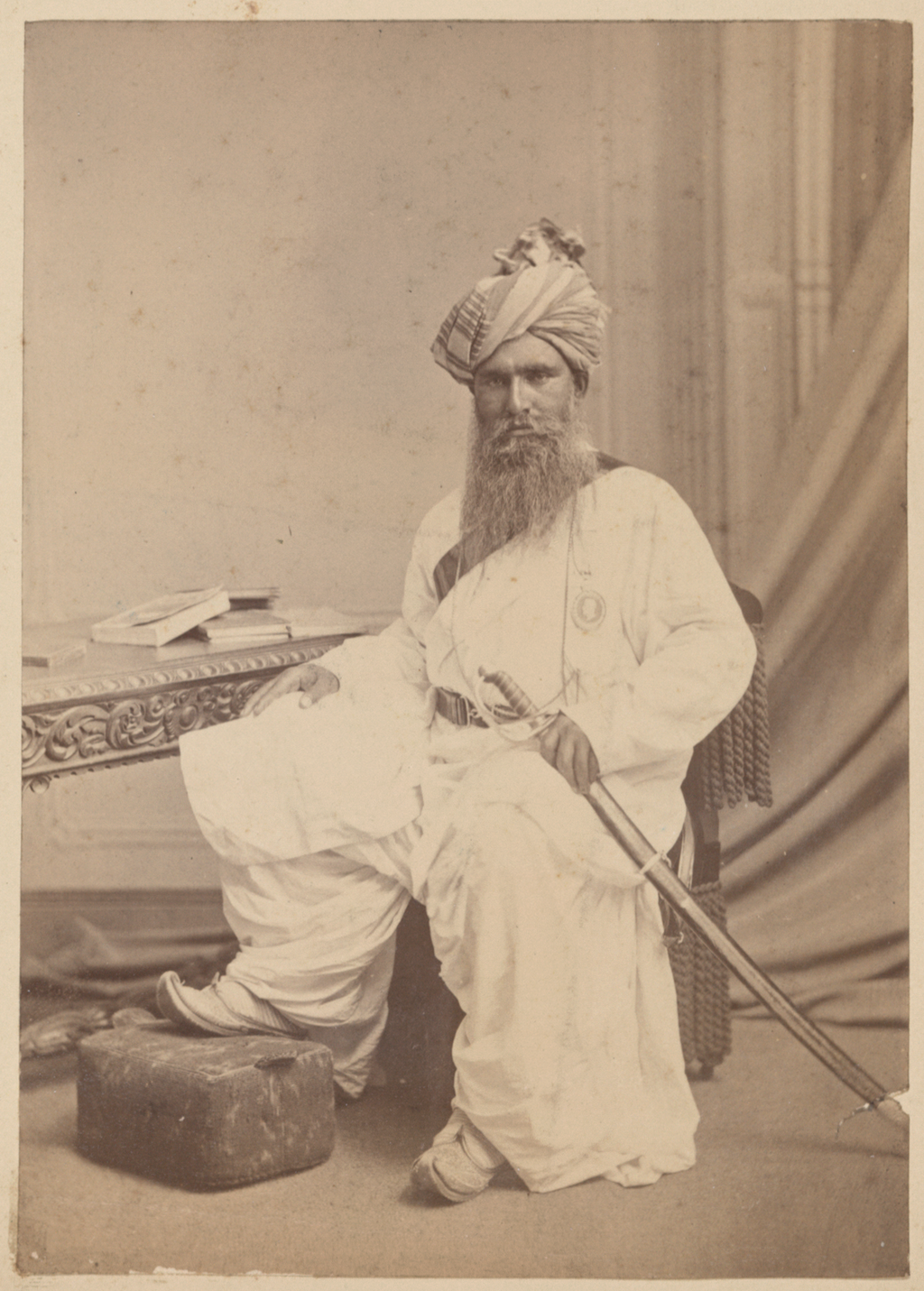
Traditional khet partug (traditional loose Peshawari shalwar) (1842)

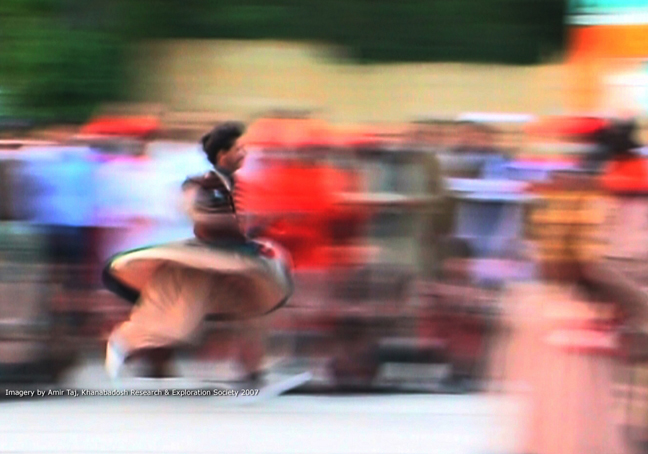
Khattak dancer wearing khet partug

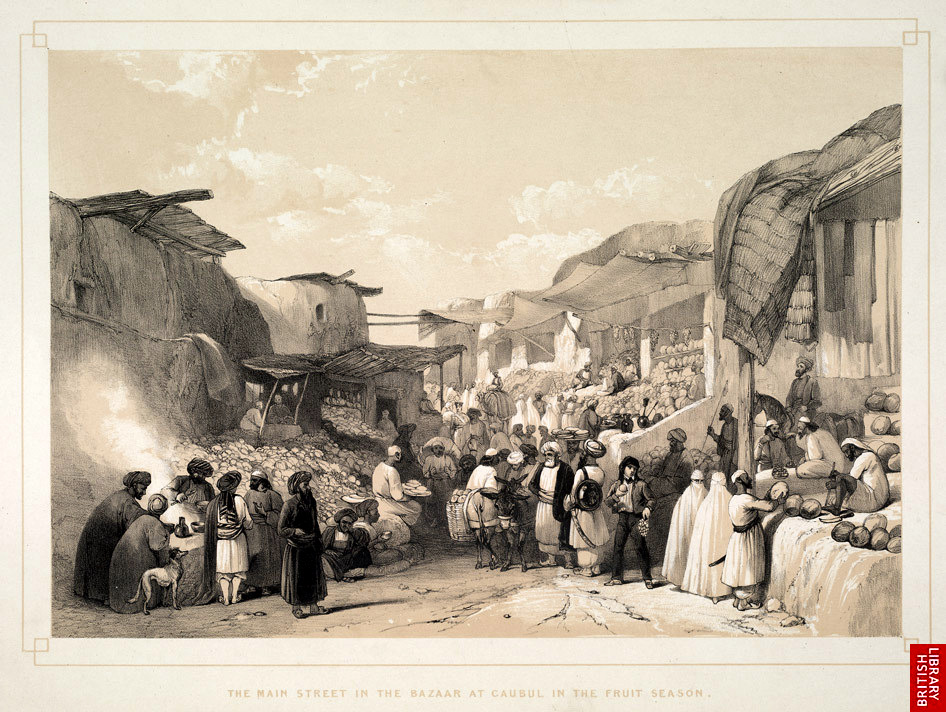
The main street in the bazaar at Caubul; men wearing khet partug (1842)

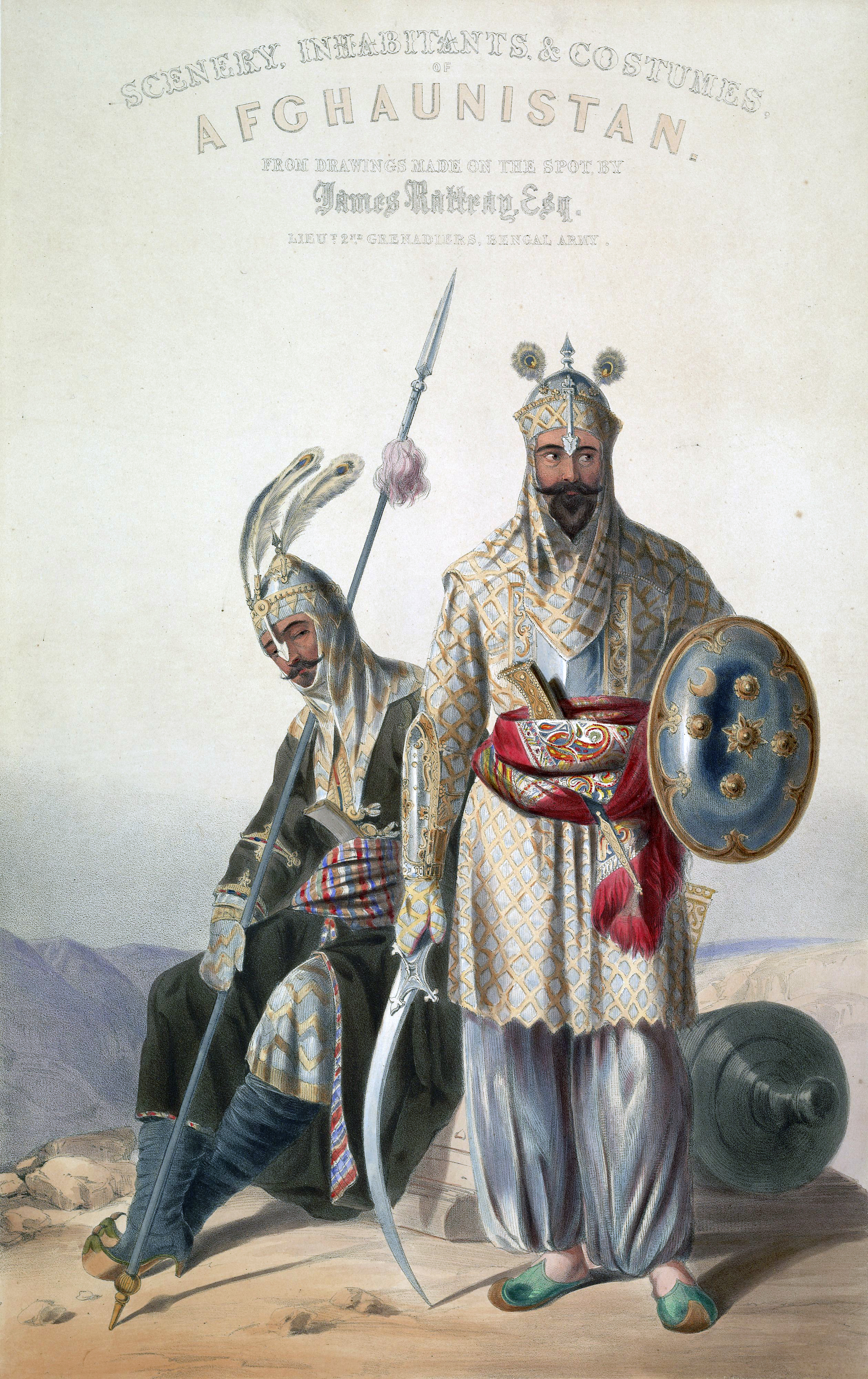
Durrani chieftains wearing khet partug

== See also ==
- Firaq partug
- Shalwar kameez
- Afghan clothing
- Pashtun clothing
