= Attan =

Dance native to the Pashtuns

Attan (Pashto: اتڼ [aˈt̪aɳ]) is a Pashtun dance. It is performed during formal and informal gatherings such as weddings, picnics, cultural events, and tribal meetings. Historically, the Attan has been conducted by Pashtuns during times of war to instill confidence and energy among warriors readying to battle. It is the national dance of Afghanistan, popularly performed by other ethnic groups within Afghanistan as well, and by the Pashtuns of Pakistan.

Attan is usually performed with a Dohol, which is a double-headed barrel drum. The dance can be anywhere from 5 to 30 minutes in duration and can change in its pace of speed, usually starting with slow movements and then finishing off fast. It revolves around the clapping of the hands that are in snyc with the beat of the drums. The hands are typically free of objects but can involve the use of handkerchiefs for visual enhancements and has historically involved the use of swords and weapons.

Depending on the region and tribe, there are different methods and styles of the Attan, for example the Paktia style. Some of the most popular variations of the dance are Kabuli, Wardaki, Logari, Paktiayi, Khosti, Kandahari, Herati, Waziri, Peshawari, and Mehsudi. Traditionally, the Attan has been performed segregated although in modern times, Pashtuns and others have performed the dance with both men and women together.

== Origin ==
Most scholars believe the Attan has Zoroastrian roots, identifying the dance as a religious ceremony of early Zoroastrianism. The dance dates back nearly 3,000 years and was performed during Zoroastrian religious ceremonies. According to Zoroastrian folklore, King Yama, a figure in Iranic mythology, celebrated Nawroz by performing an Attan with his warriors. During King Yama's time, Attan was performed before going to war because it used to give the army the confidence that they could win the battle. As well as being the national dance of Afghanistan, the Attan is also a very popular part of festivals, weddings, and other forms of celebrations.

Some believe the dance is connected to Ancient Greece and the time of Alexander, connecting the Attan to the ancient Pyrrhic war dance.

== Movement ==
To the accompaniment of drums and pipes the dancers form a circle, taking each other by the hand or preparing to revolve in circles of their own. The dance starts with slow steps that gradually get faster and faster until it seems the performers must drop from exhaustion. However, the dance continues, sometimes for two or three hours at a stretch, with no breaks except a lowering of tempo or changes in the tunes and songs.

What the Attan Dance consists of: The dancers gather in a circle, and then is followed by music which starts slow at first, and then gradually speeds up. There is a consistent beat and rhythm, and during that specific beat is when they clap inside the circle, so the movement of the hands is outside prior to the beat. It is then followed by the dancers bringing their hands out and then clapping inside the circle, and it is the same routine and pattern of movement, which then get faster. As the movements and routine get faster, the one clap turns into two claps, and the dancers who are more advanced, at times will add turns into the movements. All in all, they must keep the circular path with the clap on the beat, every other move added is up to the individuals who originate and add their own personal style to the dance. Common dance moves involve the extending of arms into air and the stretch and extension of legs. When extending arms into air, there are times when the hands are free or there is the waving of the regalia and extension of the attire to show the detail and color.

== Attire ==
Performers often wear traditional regalia when participating in the lively dance. Usually during the celebratory occasions, men can also be seen wearing suits and ties for a more formal look. The women can be found wearing bright, colorful dresses. These dresses can be accompanied with tiny mirrors on them which are said to symbolize light. The tiny mirrors add great detail and shine under the lights as the women move and dance.

In some versions of Attan, Pashtun men would flick their jet black hair in a circular motion. Men would also wear traditional turbans referred to as Lungee or Patkya which signifies what tribes they’re from and holds great importance.

== Styles and Types ==
The Attan is performed differently in many of the different parts of Afghanistan and also Pakistan. Some styles of Attan portray themes of war while others portray celebration, especially for events such as marriage, engagements, family gatherings and also as a prelude to the arrival of spring.

All different kinds of Attan are danced with the beats of the drums. However they all differ in style. The beater of the drum known as "Dum", who instantaneously change the rhythm, is circled by the performers. Below is a list of common Attan styles.

- Kochai/ Kochyano - Pashtun nomadic style done in Afghanistan. Kochyano Attan literally means Attan of the Kuchi. Women usually perform this Attan during their own occasions, such as childbirth or new years (nou rooz) and coming of spring. The men usually perform with long hair, almost to shoulder length and cut straight across the back, and some may sport a very wild mustache or beard. It is usually performed with handkerchiefs, and involves many spotting movements, with multiple twists and squatting. This dance can be up to ten steps, and also involve men walking with their knees or standing erect and snapping their head in random directions to the beat of the Dhol. The depth and complexity of their Attan may be because of the wide range of valleys they trek, and many other forms may have influenced it. This dance is performed with the musician tuning the beat to the technique of the performers.
- Logarai - From the Afghan province of Logar Logari dancers have always been known for their shyness and also for their rhythmic interruptions and spins during their local dance. Their Attan also has the trademark spins of the Logari style, using the clapping and the full twists in place, as arms are usually in the air and come together medially during the circular dance with one or two claps in the center. It is not uncommon to see one ore two circles in one. This dance typically performed by men and/or women or even young boys and/or girls. The men occasionally wear Turbans and they are taken off usually during the end of the dance when the beats get faster. The sweat on their heads from wearing the Turban, puts added weight to their hair. This dance is performed either with the beat of the musician or the musician tuning the beat to the technique of the performers.
- Paktiawal / Khostai - Notable Attan style originating from the provinces of Paktia and Khost by the Pashtun tribes there, typically the Zadrans and Mangals tribe in Afghanistan Paktia/Khosti is typically a 5-7 step and can be longer. Because of the head movements the head is snapped left and right as their long jet black hair fling through the air, and eventually ends with the dancers turned medially and squatting with arms to their sides towards the center. This dance is performed with the musician tuning the beat to the technique of the performers.
- Shinwari - Done by the Shinwari tribe of the Pashtuns from the Afghan province of Nangarhar.
- Wardag/Wardaki - Da Wardag Attan, another famous style of Attan. Wardaki consists of body movements no clapping and many turns and twists, and Spotting, as well as handkerchiefs in their hands to accentuate their spins. The men usually boast wild mustaches, including hair that is greased as to accentuate the spotting and give more weight to the hair during turns. This dance is performed either with the beat of the musician or the musician tuning the beat the technique of the performers. In some regions of Wardak within the wardaki (wardagi) attan the leading men followed by the rest will sing a song at the start of the attan, while they are still moving at a slow pace. Later on as the pace is picked up and the attan gets faster, then they stop singing and they focus all of their energy on the (movement) attan.
- Khattak Attan is a traditional type of attan performed by the Khattak Pashtun tribesmen in Pashtun areas of Pakistan. In this dance the tribesmen would skip in a circle with continuous drumbeats. They also commonly use swords with them whilst dancing twisting and twirling them in a motion
- Mehsud Attan. Typically performed by the Mehsud Pashtun tribe of Waziristan. The men would have long black beautiful hair and flick it around. In this version if the attan, the Mehsud would arm themselves with guns and would actually fire upwards in the air whilst kneeling during creating an echo of sounds whilst dancing proudly and fierociusly.
- Kabuli Attan is a modified Attan with modern music typically done by people of kabul and non pashtun groups. In this dance, the dancers perform to the beat of the musician. This dance typically performed by men and women. It involves 2–5 steps, ending with a clap given while facing the center, after which the process is repeated again. The hip and arms are put in a sequential movement including left and right tilts, with the wrists twisting in sequence, with ultimately a hand is projected outward and brought in a 'scoop-like' fashion towards the center where the other hand meets it for a clap. This dance is typically performed with the musician dictating the duration and speed.

== Gender Roles ==
The women, colourfully clad in traditional (Firaq partug) dress, join in the dance. Often, women change into an Attan dress while the men remain in their original clothes at a wedding or gathering. In the past, musicians and singers were mostly men. Dancing by men and women together increasingly gained momentum among the educated and upper- and middle-class urban families in the 1970s and afterward. The Daoud Khan and the Communist regimes encouraged young men and women to defy traditional values and participate in these public activities.

== See Also ==
Closely related circle dances can be found in the Khorasan and Sistan and Baluchestan provinces of Iran, commonly known as Chapi or Torbati there ("رقص خراسانی"or "رقص سیستانی").
