= Firaq partug =

Traditional women's clothing in Afghanistan

Firaq partug is the traditional clothing of Pashtuns who reside in Afghanistan and Pakistan especially parts of Khyber Pakhtunkhwa and Balochistan, and it has evolved with regional variations, reflecting the diverse cultural heritage of the Pashtun people. The styles vary according to region and tribe, Kuchis, Wazirs, Khattaks, Peshawaris, and Kakars all have their own style of Firaq Partug. The outfits consists of three garments: chador, firaq and partug. The word Firaq partug comes from Pashto. Firaq means a flared shirt and partug means pants.

== Chador ==
The chador is the head scarf which can be of varying lengths.

== Firaq ==
Firaq refers to the upper garment which flows out from the waist, like a skirt, with some styles reaching to the ankles and other styles reaching below the knees. The firaq is also called qameez.

== Partug ==
Partug is a type of shalwar and is the lower garment which is baggy, gathered at the ankles and tied around the waist creating folds.

== Photo gallery ==
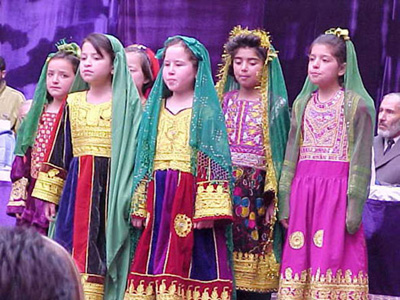
Afghan girls in traditional clothes

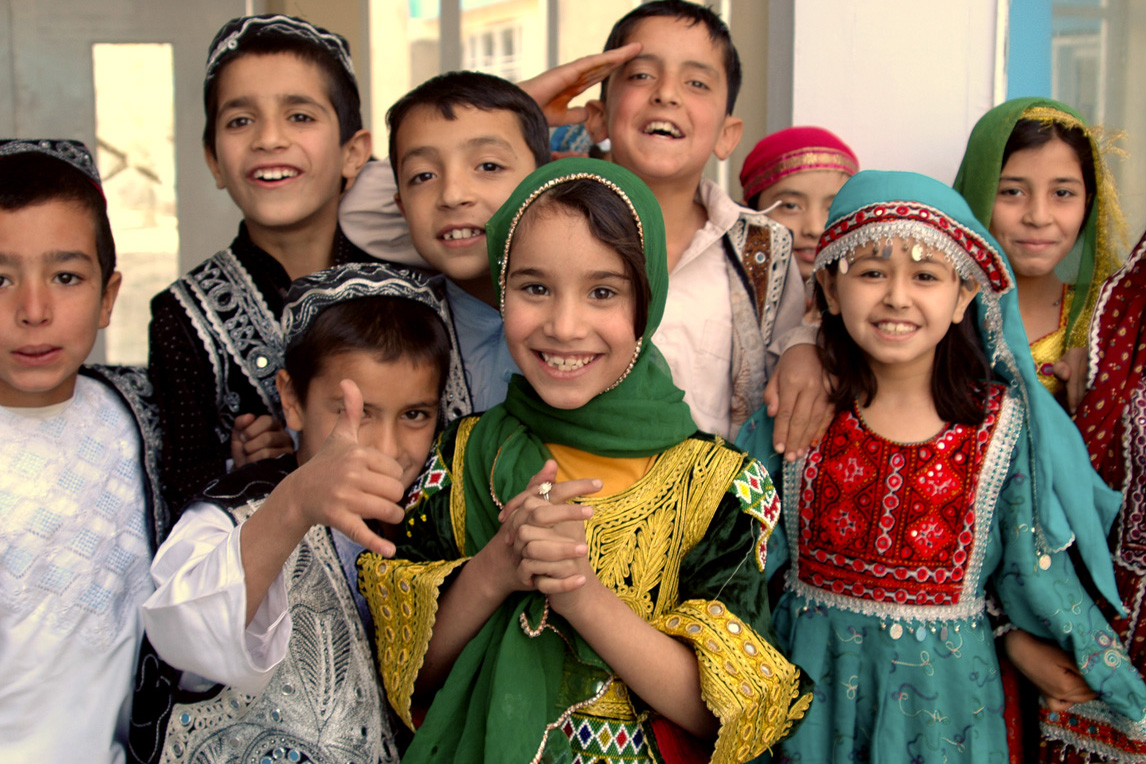
Afghan School children in Kabul

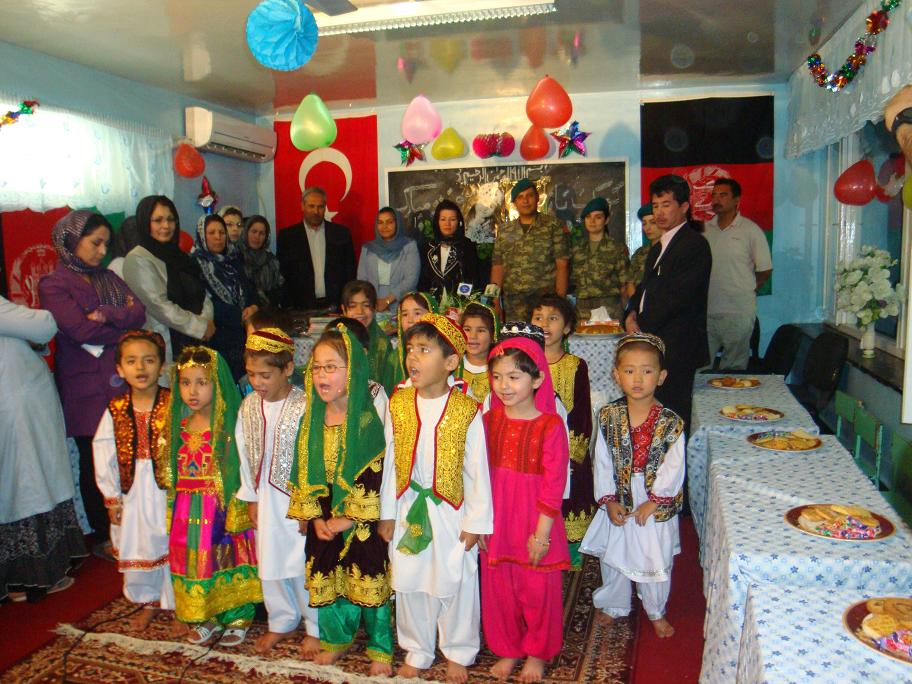
2010 Children's Day in Afghanistan

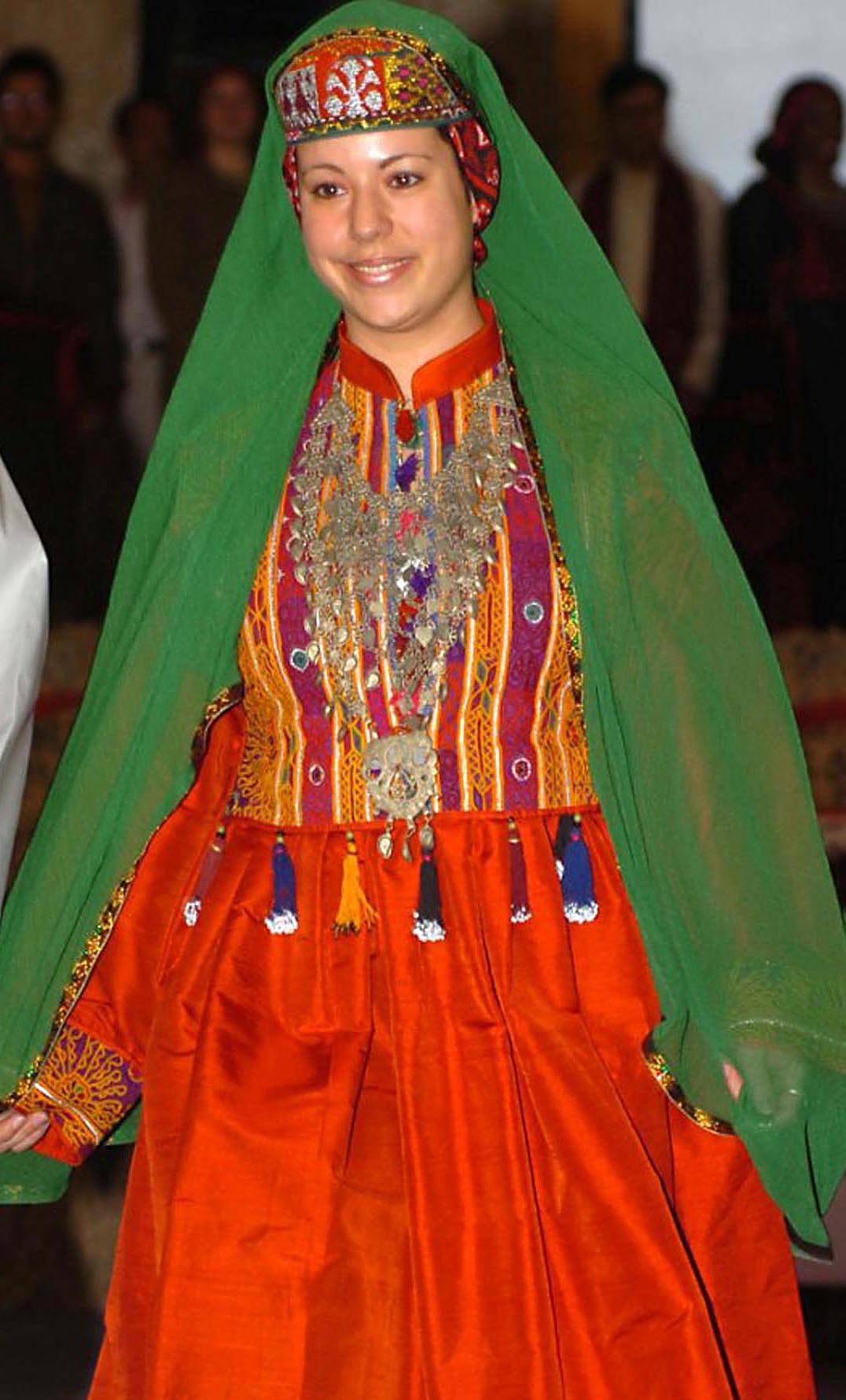
GI walks down the runway during a fashion show dressed in a colorful, traditional Afghan dress. The March 3, 2008

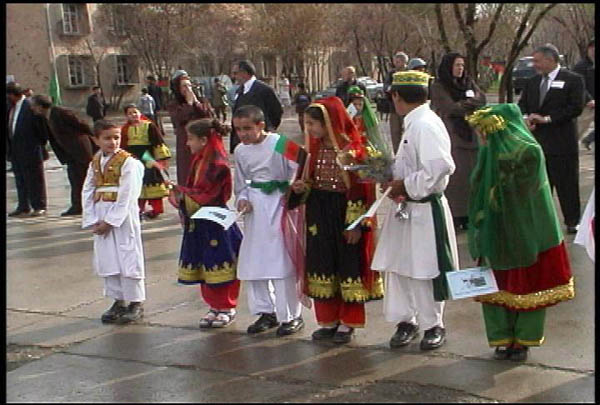
Afghan kids wearing traditional clothes in Kabul

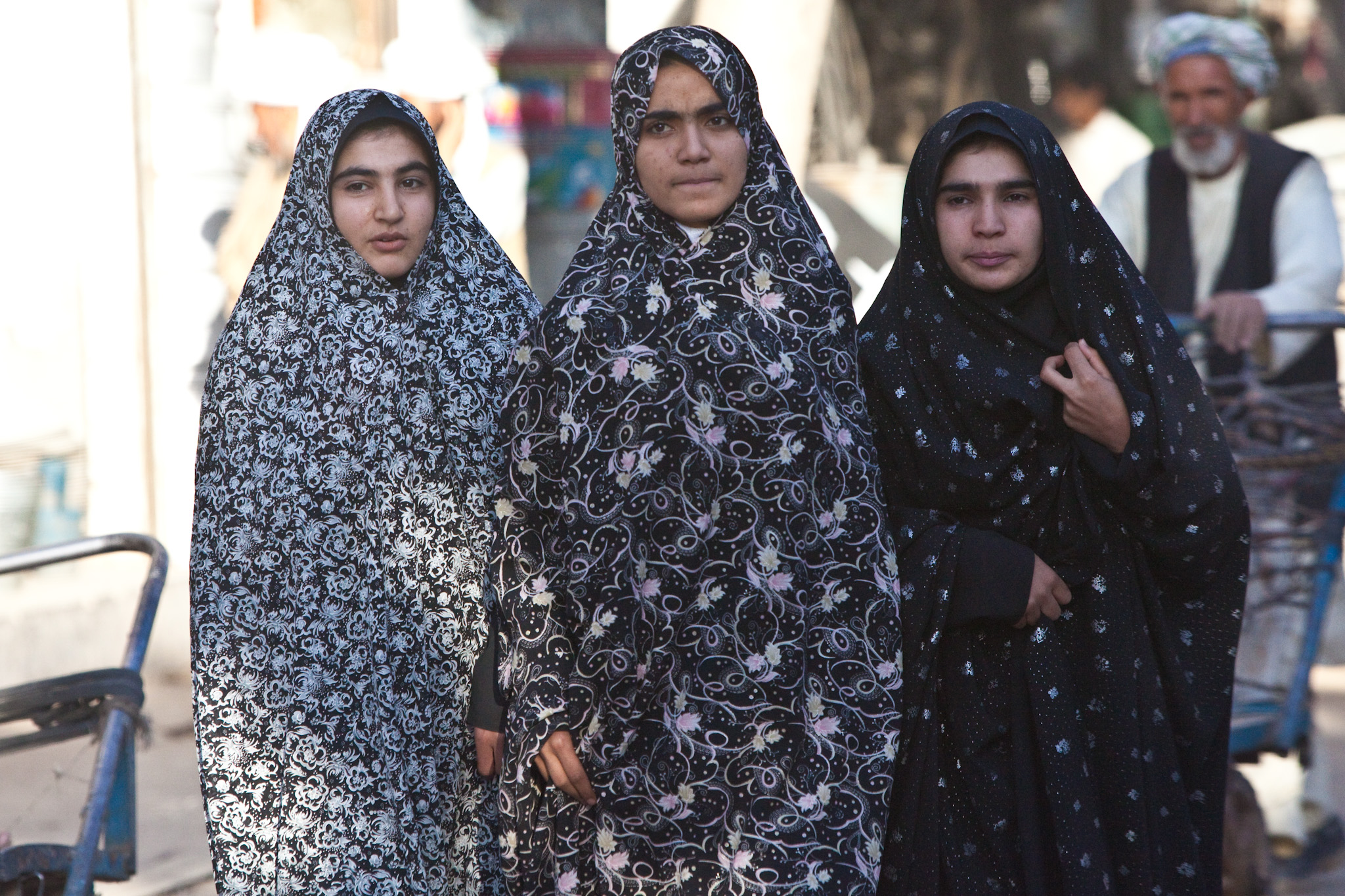
2009 Herat Afghanistan women wearing chador

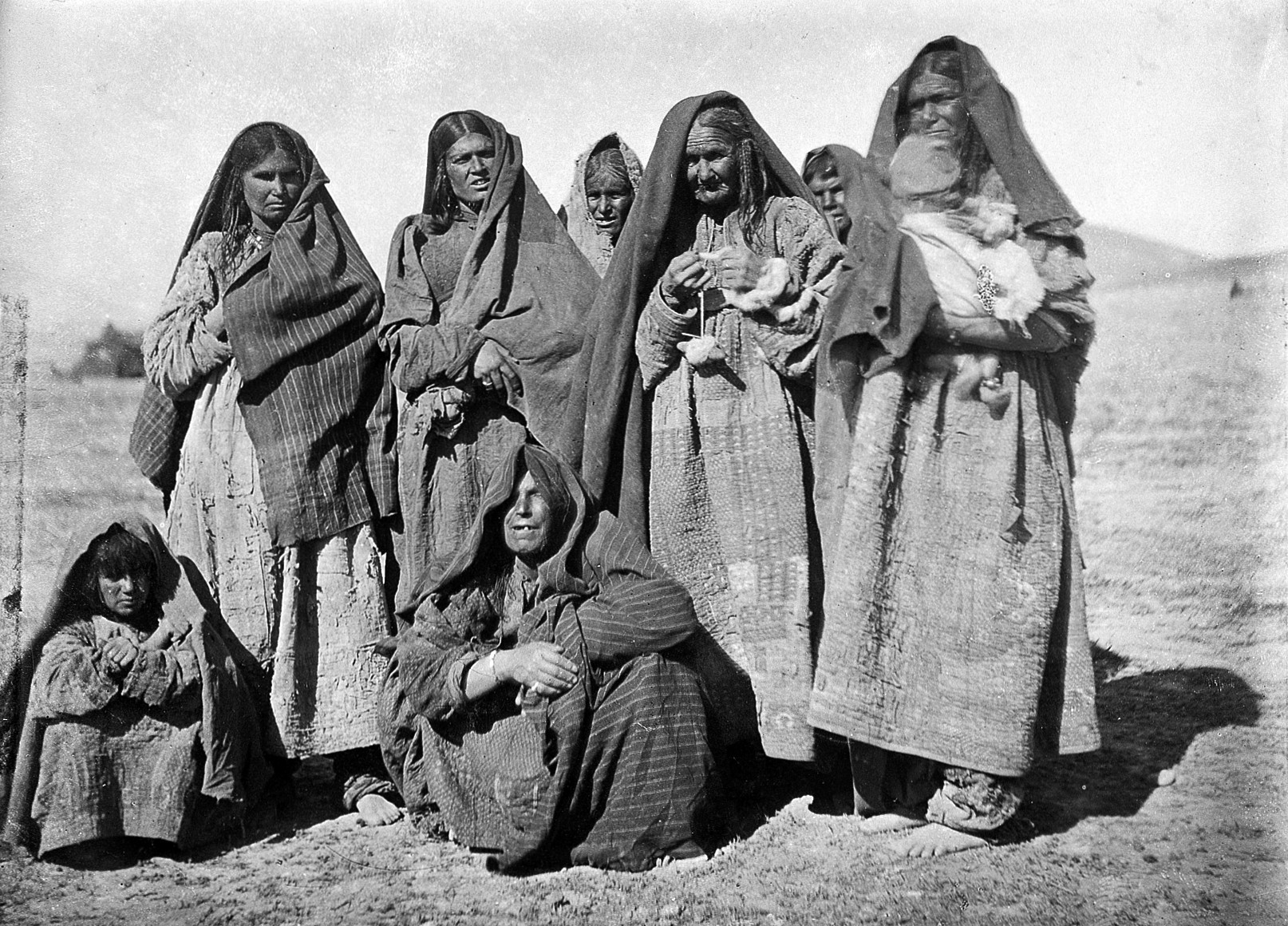
Firaq partug of the Kuchi region

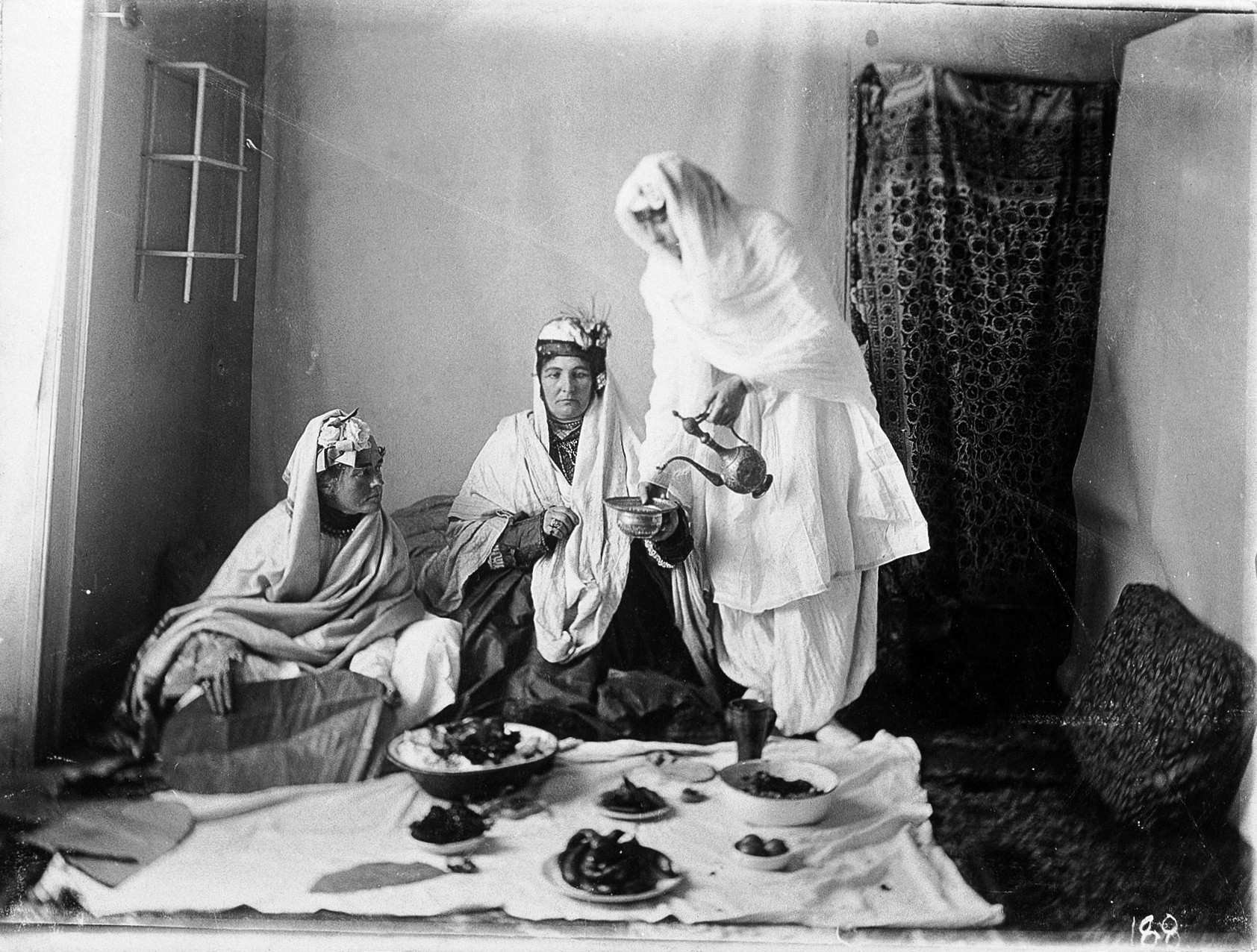
Women wearing firaq partug

== See also ==
- Khetpartug
- Afghan clothing
- Pashtun clothing
