= Khattak dance =

Tribal dance

The Khattak (Pashto: خټک اتڼ [xaˈʈak], Urdu: رقص خٹک Khattak attan) is a swift martial attan dance usually performed while carrying a sword and a handkerchief (while not always are they holding a sword and handkerchief) by the tribesmen from the agile Khattak tribe of Pashtuns. Khattak dance is also a national dance of Pakistan.

It was performed by Khattak warriors before going to wars in the time of Malik Shahbaz Khan Khattak and then Khushal Khan Khattak. It was used as a war-preparation exercise and is known to be the only dance with swordplay. Aside from the Pashtun's classical literature, popular ballads, the Pashtunwali (the common code of social values), the khattak is part of the group's collective identify.

== History ==
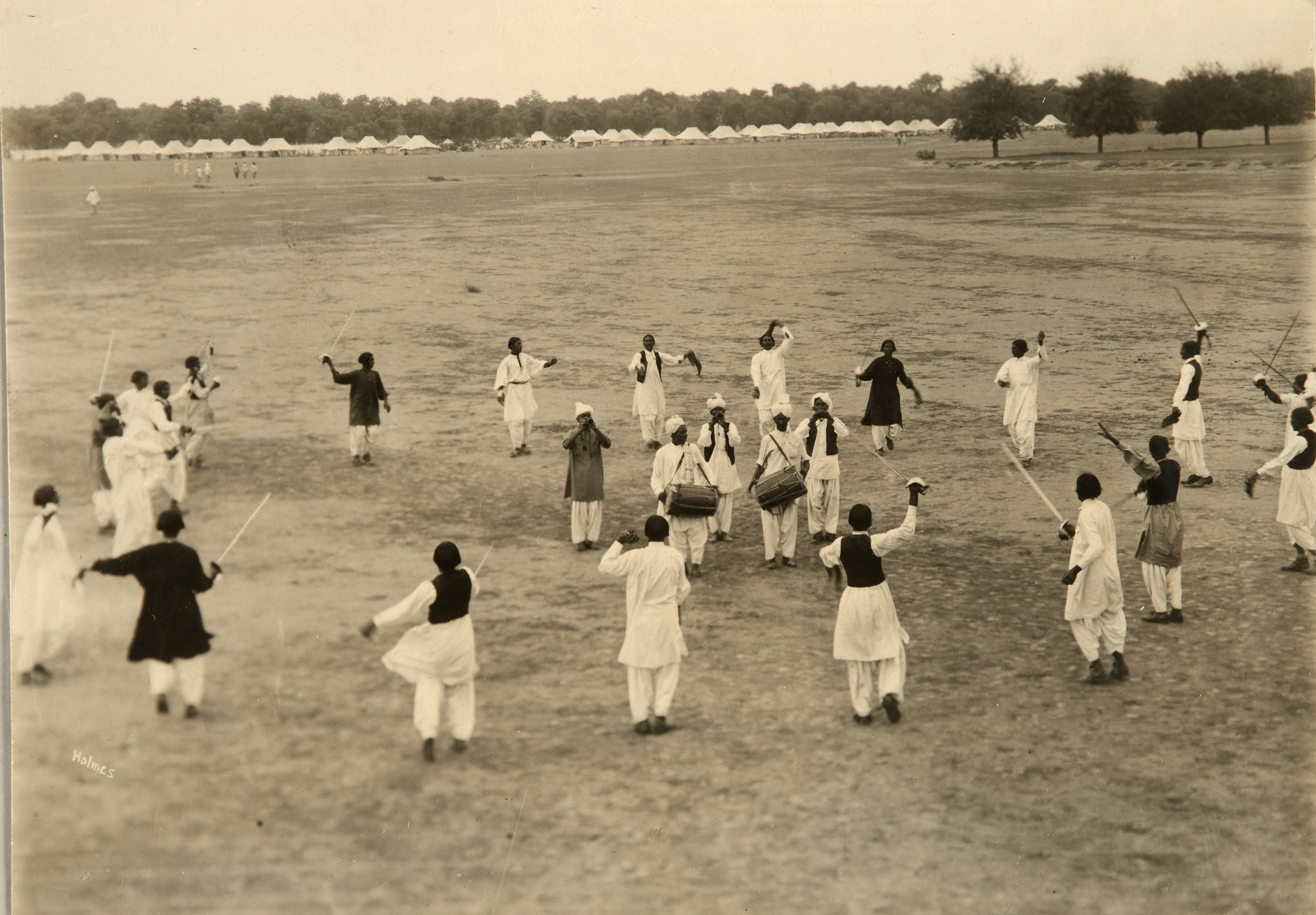
Men dancing Khattak, c. 1935

It originated in the Pashtun regions of present-day Pakistan amongst the Khattak tribe of Pashtuns. It is a varied form of Athan, or Attan, which has been preserved in one of its earliest forms by members of the Khattak and other Pashtun tribes, including the Ghilzais. There are many regional variations of Athan. In traditional Pashtun areas, the dance Athena had the same definition and reverence attached to it as Pashtuns accord to Athan. Athena seems to appeared era while Athan survived in present eastern Afghanistan and north western Pakistan amongst Pashtuns.

A journalist of Pashtun origin, Amanullah Ghilzai, traced the roots of Khattak to an ancient Greek dance. According to his theory, Khatak, or Athan, is one of the earliest forms of the ancient Greek dance dedicated to Athena. The Greeks had bequeathed the conventional dance for ancient Pashtun-dominated regions when they had colonised this region for several centuries ago. In ancient Greece, Athena had the same definition and reverence attached to it as Pashtuns accord to Athan. Athena seems to have disappeared in Greece during the Christian era while Athan survived in Afghanistan and Pashtun parts of Pakistan.

== Details ==
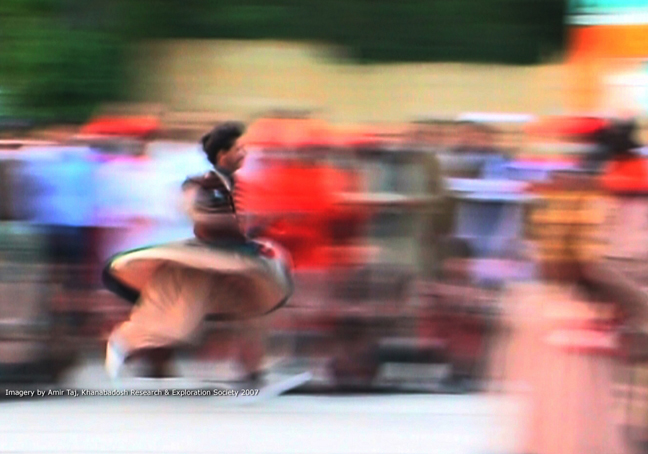

Khattak style is men performing this dance with their weapons in their hands. A Khattak dancer performs with the zeal of a hero, displaying his physical fitness through body movements while holding one, two or even three swords at a time. Each sword weighs about 1 1/2 kilograms. The dance is a 5-step routine involving spins, with the swords crossed over their backs and elbows outward, or it can be performed with the swords out to the sides and typically attain half spin in place leading to a full spin. Depending on the rhythm of the beat, this spin can be completely reversed in full synchronicity. This dance is performed with the musician tuning the beat to the technique of the performers. It is performed very quickly, set to uptempo music featuring the piper, Clarion, and drums beaten with sticks. Up to forty men dance together wielding swords or handkerchiefs and performing acrobatic feats. The fast tempo of Khattak distinguishes it from other attan, which start slowly and pick up speed as the dance progresses.

A khattak dance performed at night begins with an introductory music, dominated by the slow and irregular beating of the drum called dhol, as the dancers begin to circle a couple of lanterns placed at the center. In some cases, the dancers perform around a bonfire. The steps could appear strange for an onlooker since they involve exaggerated backward and forward strides, punctuated by swordplays such as air thrusts and parries. The pace of the dance quickens along with the beat. The rhythm transitions are often accompanied by hand movements while the finale features the continuous twirling on the dancers' toes until they were completely exhausted. At this point, the dance resembled the Sufi's whirling dervishes in that it goes on until no one is left dancing.

== Various forms ==
The Khattak dance and individual performance.

Bangrai is derived from word Bangrai or Bhangrai (Bangle). This dance has to be performed in circle. A bird's view of the performance looks like a bangle so this is why it is called Bangra or Bhangra. This is merely an exercise to warm up body muscles it is slow in rhythm and with pauses to hold sword like today soldiers hold rifle in Musketry. In the Bangra, every member swirls while carrying swords. In 1–3 circles, an unlimited number of elders, young, and children, each carrying a sword and a handkerchief, start dancing in a circle having band and surnai in the centre. At the beginning of Bhangra, few performers turn by turn sing love songs or quotations which is called "Takkay" (5-7 Takkay by each, Takkay is commonly popular in sheep herders, they sit on the hills and sing on the top of hill with high pitch, if someone there on other hill he will reply the Takkay in return and some play it with their floats), at a high pitch, which is meant to convey to the audience that they would like to be tipped for their performance. At the end of the song, the drumbeat increases and the dance goes on.

Balbala is performed immediately by the same group stage with fast rhythm to sweat up the body. Balballa is staged without swords. Qamar balbala is exercise to get control on stepping and stable body balance at the top of hill and it is performed with swords. A sword is used to keep balance while moving quickly on the uneven surface of the hill.

Individual performance of Khattak dance comprises 12 steps, which require great skill on the part of the dancers. The dancer alternates between performing solo and synchronizing with the rest of the troupe. Groups of two or four performers carrying a sword and a handkerchief, perform turn by turn, while the rest of the troupe members wait for their turn. In the Laila, a group of four performers holding two swords each perform stunts while moving in a circle.

Braghoni is the fastest and the most adventurous of all the steps: A single dancer performs with three swords. He swings two swords in the air while holding the third in his mouth.

== See also ==
- Kathak dance
