= Pashtun clothing =

Clothing of Pashtun people from Afghanistan

Pashtun clothing (Pashto: پښتنې جامې) is the type of clothing worn by the Pashtun people within Afghanistan and within the neighboring Pakhtunkhwa region. As a chiefly rural and tribal population, Pashtun clothing varies by tribe and region and encompasses unique styles and renditions. Pashtun clothing is typically made from a variety of linens and encompasses upper garments (for the head and torso) and lower garments (for the legs and feet) and comes in different sizes and variations, ranging from loose fitting to tight fitting. More unique variations include embroidery and jewelry on both male and female clothing that enhance the appearance. The different articles of Pashtun clothing include long coats, short coats, waistcoats, hats, turbans, shawls, and footwear. Pashtun clothing has been historically designed to accommodate and adapt to the climate that the Pashtun people reside in, ranging from light clothing for desert weather to heavy clothing for cold winters.

== Men's dress ==
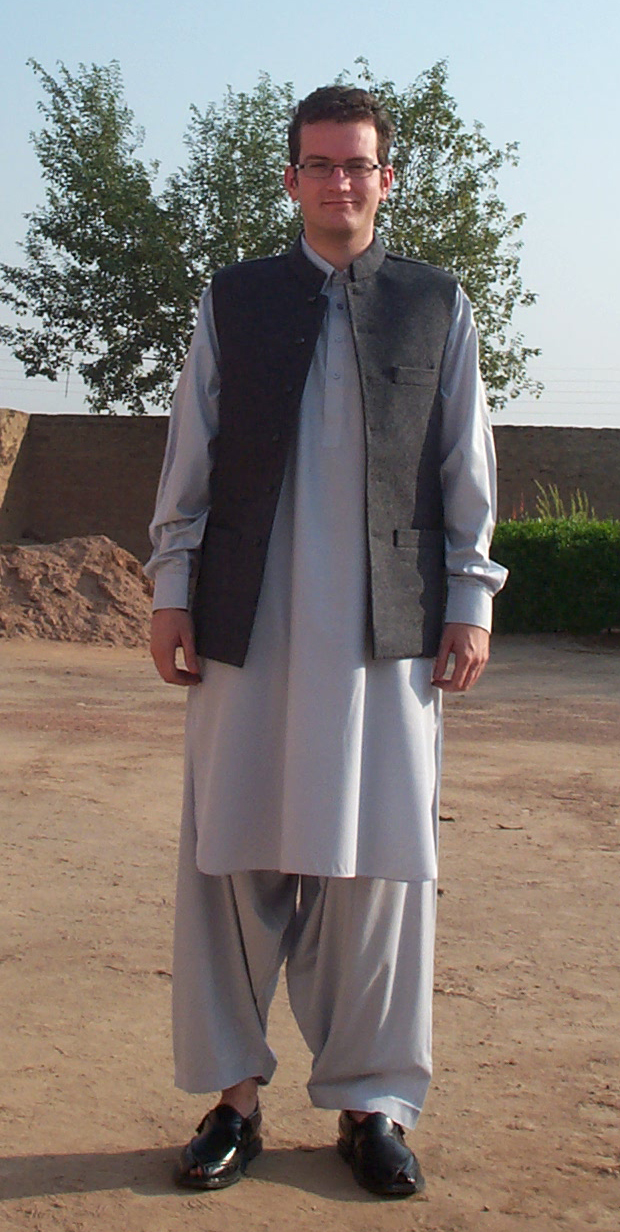
Khet Partug and Waskat are commonly worn by Pashtun men

Pashtun men usually wear a Khet Partug (Pashto: خېت پړتون), a combination of an upper linen garment and a lower linen garment that covers the body from neck to ankle. Besides this, Pashtun men typically wear garments such as waistcoats, long coats, or shawls on top of the Khet Partug as an enhancement. Tribal variations of turbans (lungaye لونګای) and hats (patkaye پټکای) are worn by the Pashtun men on their heads as a head dress. The variations and styles of clothing for Pashtun men can differ based on tribal and regional affiliation. The style of Pashtun fashion from Kandahar varies from the Pashtun fashion of Paktia or Peshawar, as example. Leaders or tribal chiefs sometimes wear a karakul hat, such as Hamid Karzai, Nur Muhammad Taraki, Hafizullah Amin, Zahir Shah and others.

== Women's dress ==
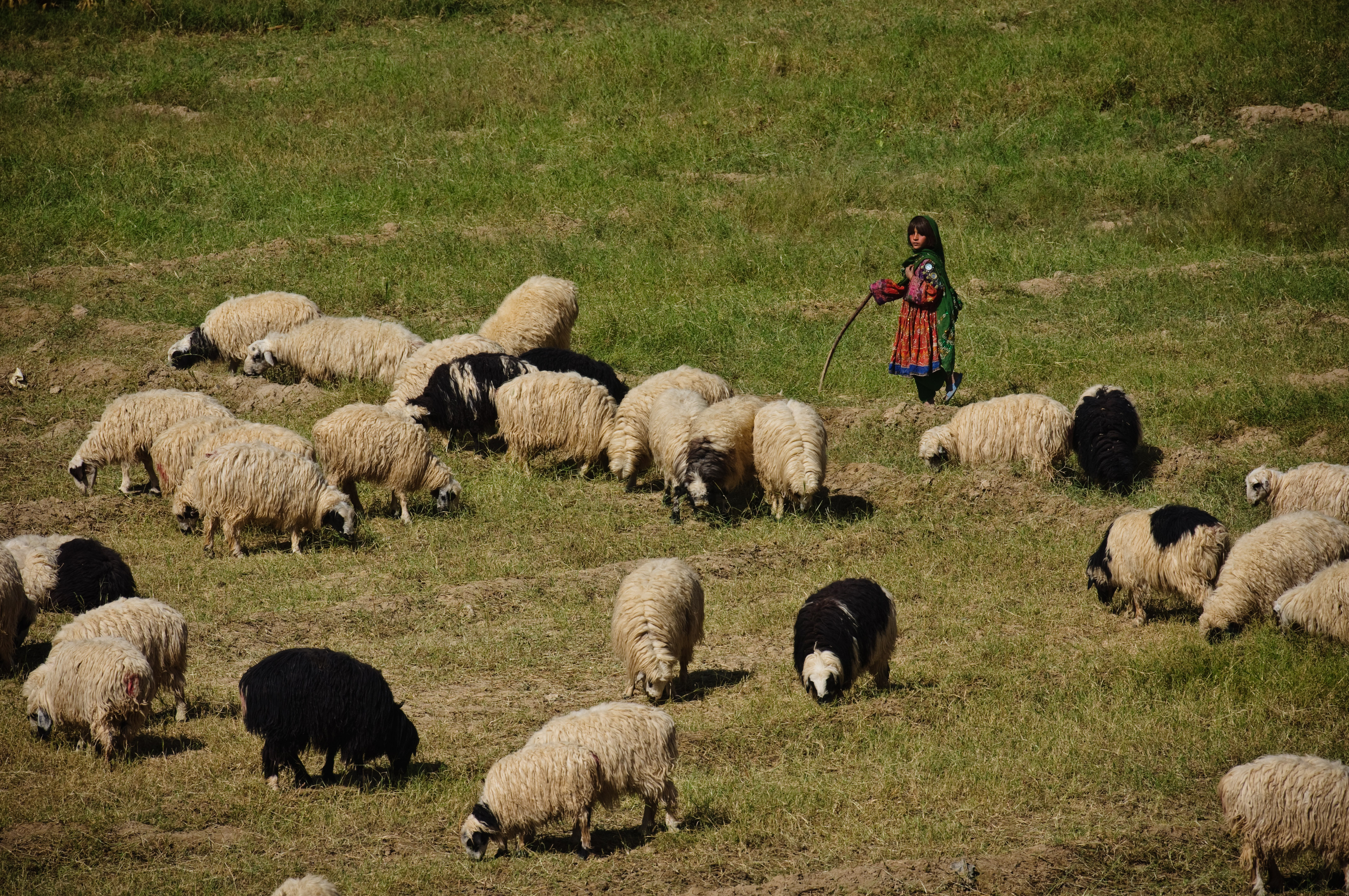
A Pashtun Kochi girl in Southern Afghanistan with her sheep

Pashtun women also wear the Khet Partug (Pashto: کټ پرتوګ), though in a feminine rendition. They traditionally wear a long tunic (khet کټ) over loose-fitting trousers (partug پرتوګ) of a similar or contrasting color, along with a head covering (tekraye ټکرای) over their heads. Tunics often feature beaded or felt panels at the shoulder and at the front of the bodice or waist sections. The tunics have historically included the addition of embroidery and jewelry for visual enhancement. Shapes for casual and festive clothing are similar, as are shapes for winter and summer clothing, but colors and fabrics can reflect the formality and seasonality of the garment. This style of clothing derives from the Pashtun Kochi dress that has been worn traditionally and historically by the Kochi nomads. The dress is no longer exclusive to the nomadic Kochi women and is now associated with all Pashtun women, whether settled or nomadic, in general.

== See also ==
- Afghan clothing
- Pashtun culture
