= Surkh Dheri =

Coordinates: 34.2962°N 72.239034°E

Surkh Dheri is a village in Mardan District, Khyber Pakhtunkhwa, Pakistan.

== Demographics and culture ==
The population of Surkh Dheri is about 6000 to 7000. The dominant language in this village is Pashto. Islam is the dominant religion and culture. The people of Surkh Dheri wear Shalwar kameez.

== Problems ==
Gas and electricity are major problems. The people use gas cylinders for their cooking.
