= Anarkali salwar kameez =

Indian salwar kameez

An anarkali is a type of women's suit consisting of a long, frock-style top and a slim-fitting bottom. The top varies in length and may feature embroidery, ranging from knee-length to floor-length designs. It is described by author Diptakirti Chaudhuri as a "long, flowing, voluminous kurta". Rupsha Sen of Filmfare states that the anarkali is "popular among women of all ages" and is "worn for almost every special occasion, including weddings, parties, festivals, and social gatherings". The garment is also worn as a dance costume, including in Kathak and Kathakali performances.

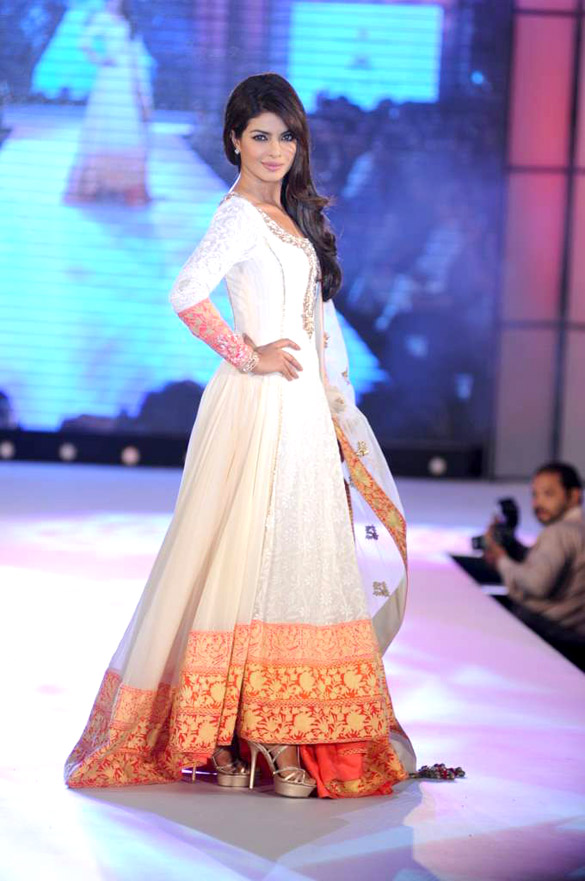
Indian actress Priyanka Chopra modeling an Anarkali dress

Anarkali suits owe their name to the eponymous character played by actress Madhubala in the 1960 Indian epic film Mughal-e-Azam. The embellished blue-and-red anarkali costume worn by Madhubala in the song "Pyar Kiya To Darna Kya" became "a fashion staple for Indian women across ages", according to India Today. The anarkali has remained popular in the 21st century, with author Sujata Assomull including it in the book "100 Iconic Bollywood Costumes" (2020).

The anarkali has also been adapted as a garment for men, sometimes referred to as a "manarkali". Fashion designers associate the men's anarkali with the flared silhouette of the traditional angrakha.

== Types ==
The following are some of the different types of anarkali suits:

1. Floor-Length Anarkali Suits
2. Cape Anarkali Suits
3. Jacket Anarkali Suits
4. Layered Anarkali Suits
5. Gown Style Anarkali Suits
6. Palazzo Anarkali Suit
7. Churidar Anarkali Suit

== See also ==
- Shalwar kameez
