= Shalwar kameez =

Trousers and tunic worn in South Asia

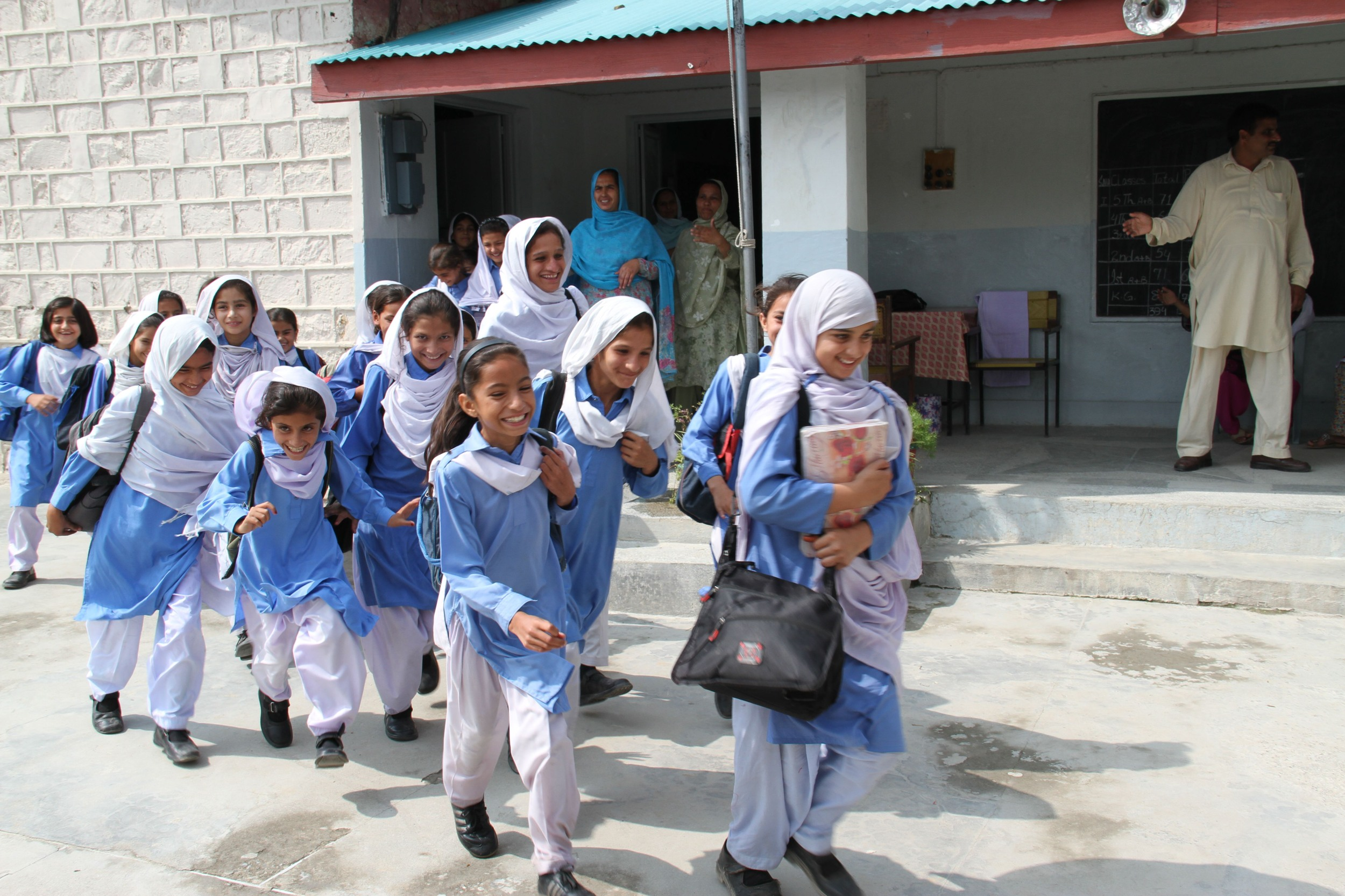
Schoolgirls in Abbottabad, Khyber Pakhtunkhwa, Pakistan, in shalwars with cuffed hems, and kameez with collars

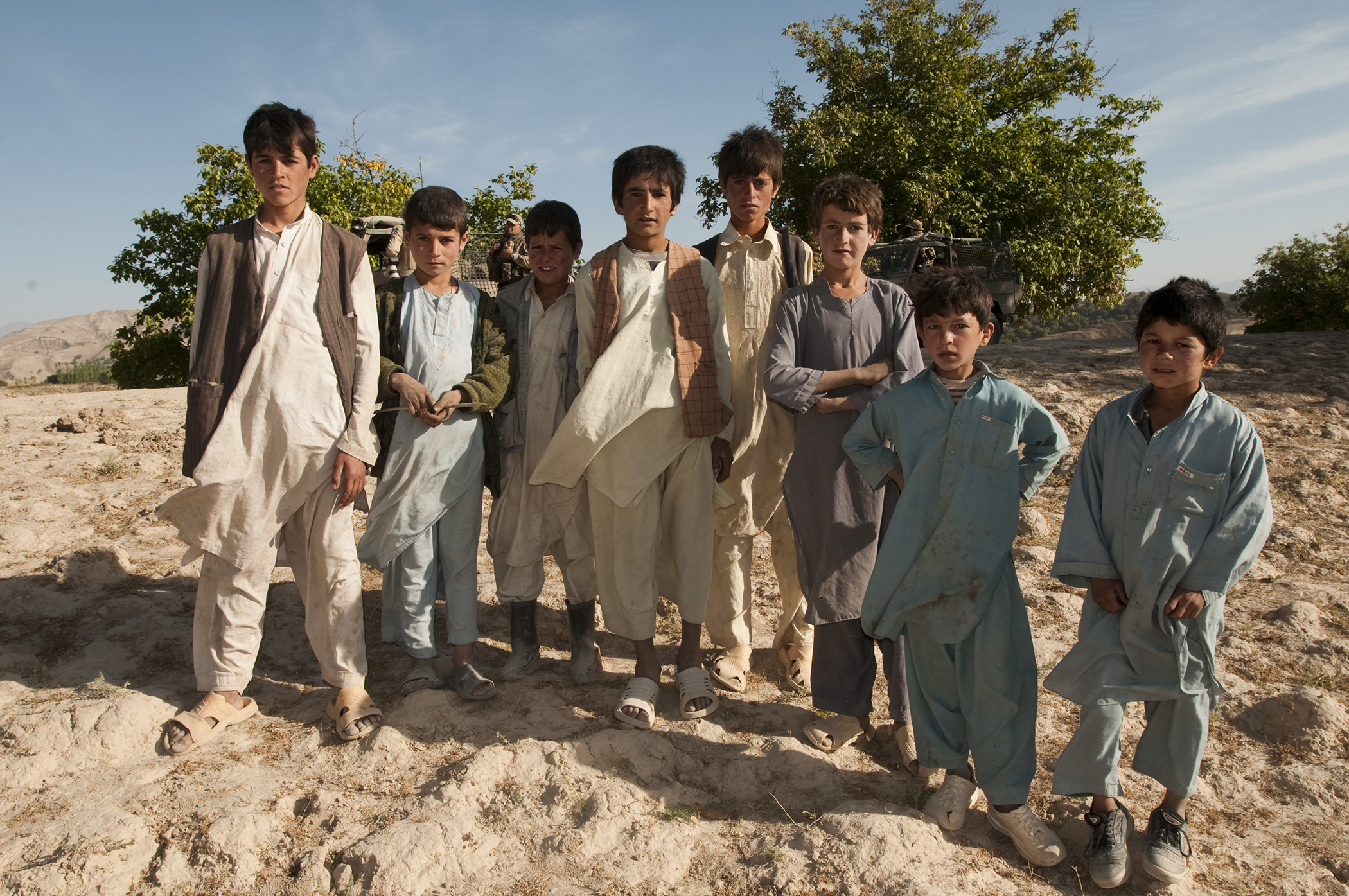
Boys in Badakshan, Afghanistan, wearing kameez tunics, showing side seams left open below the waist

Shalwar kameez (also salwar kameez and less commonly shalwar qameez) is a traditional combination dress worn by men and women in South Asia, and Central Asia.

Shalwars are trousers which are atypically wide at the waist and narrow to a cuffed bottom. They are held up by a drawstring or elastic belt, which causes them to become pleated around the waist. The trousers can be wide and baggy, or they can be cut quite narrow, on the bias. Shalwars have been traditionally worn in a wide region which includes Eastern Europe, West Asia, Central Asia, and South Asia. The kameez is a long shirt or tunic. The side seams are left open below the waist-line (the opening known as the chaak (Note: A Dictionary of Urdu, Classical Hindi, and English: chāk derives from the Persian "چاك ćāk, Fissure, cleft, rent, slit, a narrow opening (intentionally left in clothes).")), which gives the wearer greater freedom of movement. The kameez is usually cut straight and flat; older kameez use traditional cuts; modern kameez are more likely to have European-inspired set-in sleeves. The kameez may have a European-style collar, a Mandarin collar, or it may be collarless; in the latter case, its design as a women's garment is similar to a kurta. The combination garment is sometimes called salwar kurta, salwar suit, or Punjabi suit.

The shalwar and kameez were introduced into South Asia by arriving Muslims in the north in the 13th century: at first worn by Muslim women, their use gradually spread, making them a regional style, especially in the historical Punjab region. The shalwar-kameez is widely-worn by men and women in Pakistan, and is the country's national dress. It is also widely worn by men and women in Afghanistan, and some men in the Punjab region of India, and which it has been adopted since medieval times by women throughout India, and more generally in South Asia.

When women wear the shalwar-kameez in some regions, they usually wear a long scarf or shawl called a dupatta around the head or neck. In South Asia, the dupatta is also employed as a form of modesty—although it is made of delicate material, it obscures the upper body's contours by passing over the shoulders. For Muslim women, the dupatta is a less stringent alternative to the chador or burqa (see hijab and purdah); for Sikh and Hindu women, the dupatta is useful when the head must be covered, as in a temple or the presence of elders. Everywhere in South Asia, modern versions of the attire have evolved; the shalwars are worn lower down on the waist, the kameez have shorter lengths, higher splits, lower necklines and backlines, and with cropped sleeves or without sleeves.

== Description ==
The shalwar are loose pyjama-like trousers. The legs are wide at the top, and narrow at the ankle. The kameez is a long shirt or tunic, often seen with a Western-style collar; however, for female apparel, the term is now loosely applied to collarless or mandarin-collared kurtas. The kameez might be worn with pyjamas as well, either for fashion or comfort. Some kameez styles have side seams (known as the chaak), left open below the waist-line, giving the wearer greater freedom of movement.

== Styles ==
The kameez can be sewn straight and flat, in an "A" shape design or flowing like a dress; there are a variety of styles. Modern kameez styles are more likely to have European-inspired set-in sleeves. If the tailor's taste or skill is displayed, this will be seen in the shape of the neckline and the decoration of the kameez. The kameez may be cut with a deep neckline, sewn in diaphanous fabrics, or styled in cap-sleeve or sleeveless designs.

There are many styles of shalwar: the Peshawari shalwar, Balochi shalwar, Sindhi Chareno, Sindhi Kancha, Sindhi Suthan/Salwar, Sindhi Pajamo/Sorhi Suthan and Punjabi shalwar.

Although various regions of the Indian subcontinent now wear the outfit in its various forms, the outfit was originally only popular on a wide scale in Afghanistan, Khyber Pakhtunkhwa, Sindh, Balochistan and the Punjab region of the Indian subcontinent. However, the shalwar kameez has now become popular across the Indian subcontinent.

== Different forms ==
The following are some of the styles of shalwar kameez.

=== Anarkali suit ===
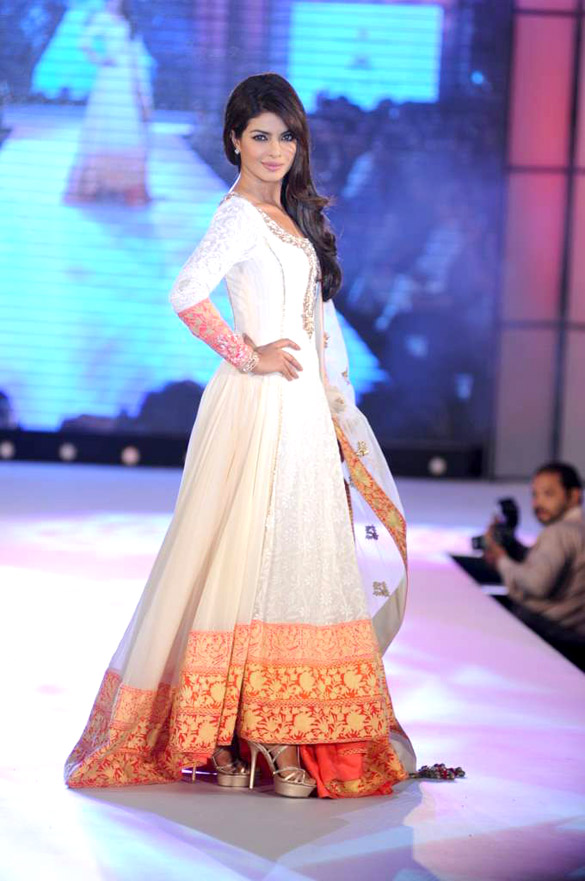
Priyanka Chopra modeling an Anarkali suit.

The shalwar kameez known as the Anarkali suit is named after the legendary Mughal courtesan Anarkali. This suit has a timeless style which has become very popular. It is made up of a long, frock-style top and features a slim fitted bottom. This style of suit links the Indian subcontinent with the women's firaq partug (frock and shalwar) of northwestern Pakistan and Afghanistan and to the traditional women's clothing of parts of Central Asia. It also links to the Punjab region, where the Anarkali suit is similar to the anga and the Peshwaz worn in Jammu.

=== Afghanistan suits ===
The styles of shalwar kameez worn in Afghanistan include various styles of khet partug, perahan tunban and Firaq partug worn by Pashtuns, Tajiks, and Hazaras. The shalwar tends to be loose and rests above the ankles.

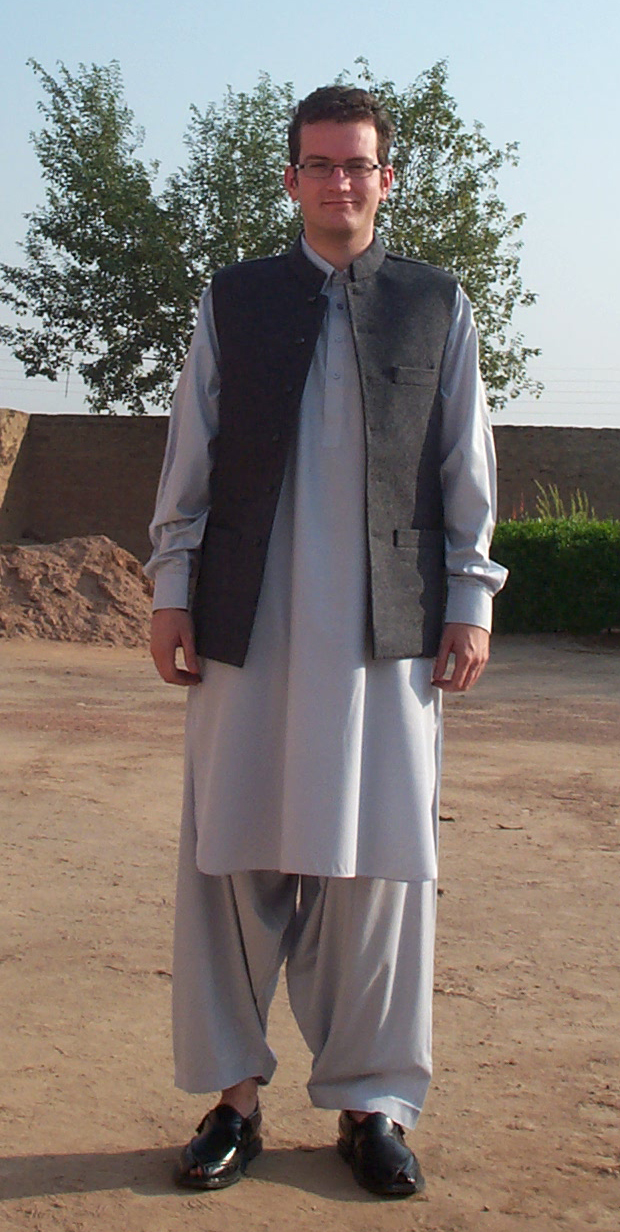
Perahan tunban worn by most Pashtun males in Afghanistan and Pakistan

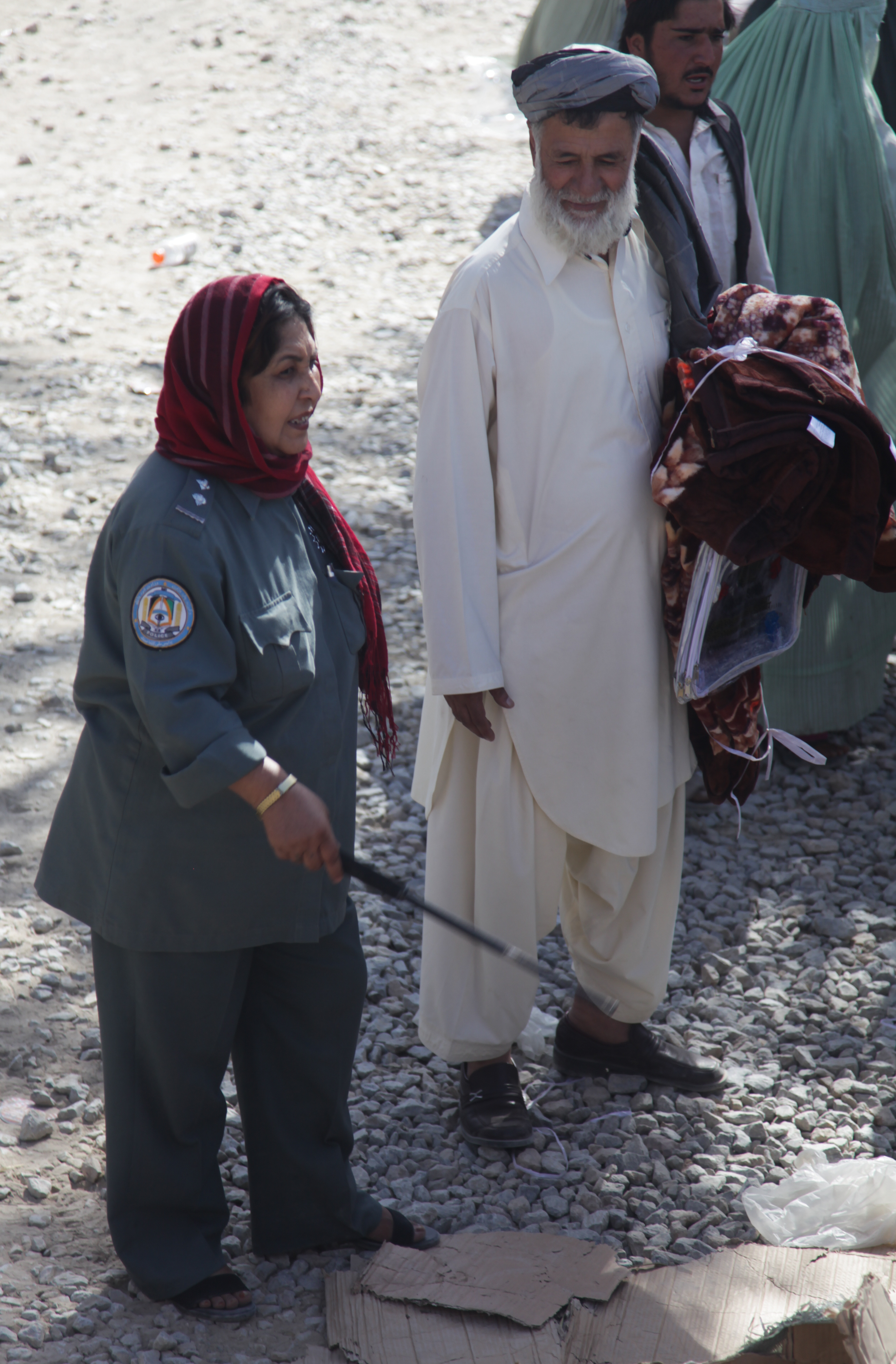
Man in Afghan clothing: perahan tunban

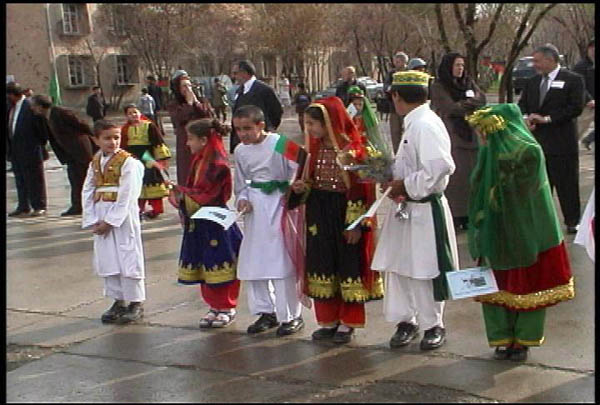
Afghan children wearing traditional clothes in Kabul

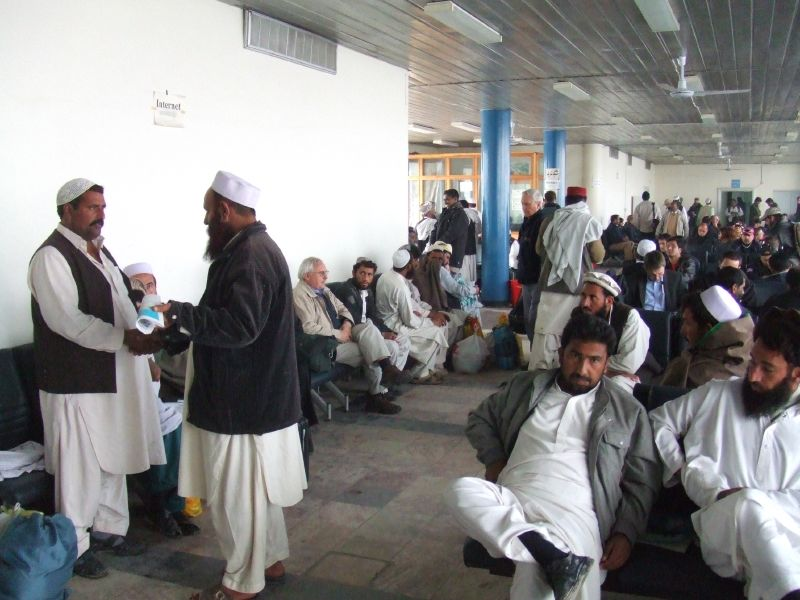
Men wearing perahan tunban, a form of shalwar kameez at Kabul Airport in Afghanistan

=== Peshawari shalwar suit ===
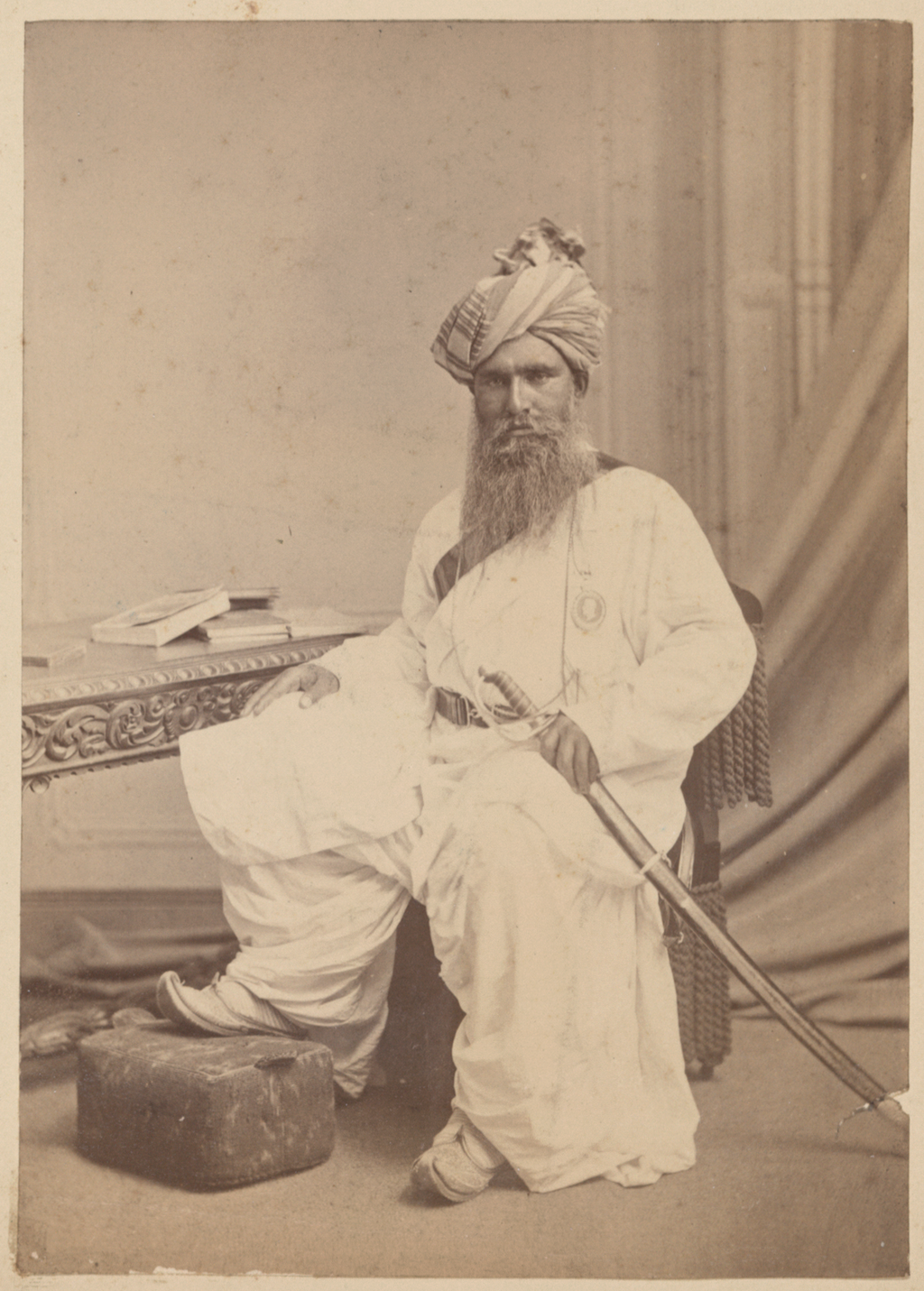
Traditional Khet partug (traditional loose Peshawari shalwar)

The traditional dress of Peshawar and other parts of Khyber Pakhtunkhwa, Pakistan, is the khalqa (gown) which opens at the front, or shirt which does not open at the front, and the Peshawari shalwar which is very loose down to the ankles. The Peshawari shalwar can be used with a number of upper garments and is part of the clothing of Khyber Pakhtunkhwa.

=== Balochi suits ===
The clothing of Balochistan, Pakistan includes the shalwar kameez which when worn by males consists of a very baggy shalwar using large lengths of cloth. The kameez is also loose, and traditionally is long, with long sleeves. The present Balochi shalwar kameez replaced the earlier version which consisted of a robe to the ankles and a shalwar using cloth of up to 40 yards. The Pashtuns in northern Balochistan wear clothes similar to the styles worn in Afghanistan.

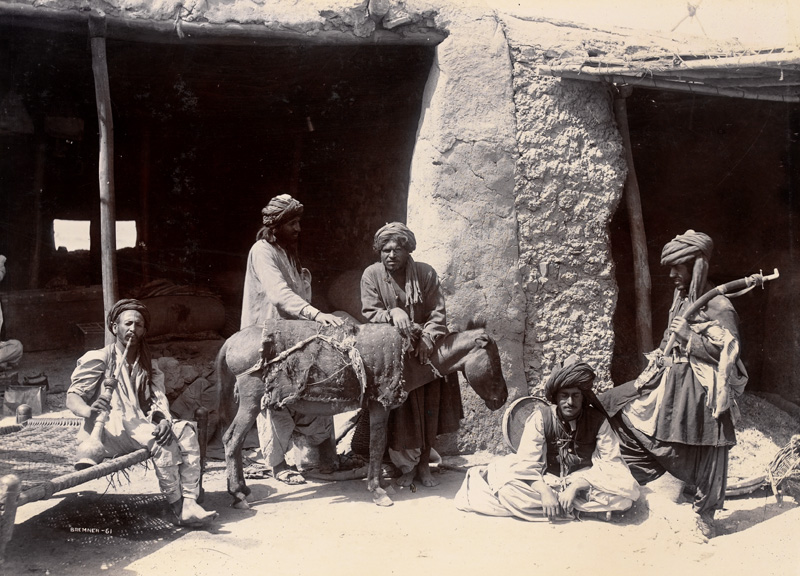
Balochi male shalwar kameez, Quetta, 1867

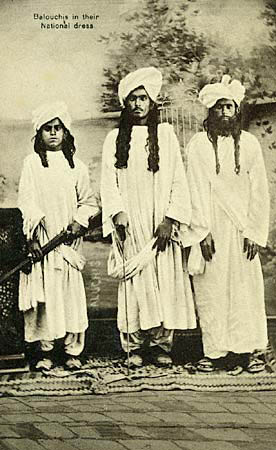
Traditional Balochi suits

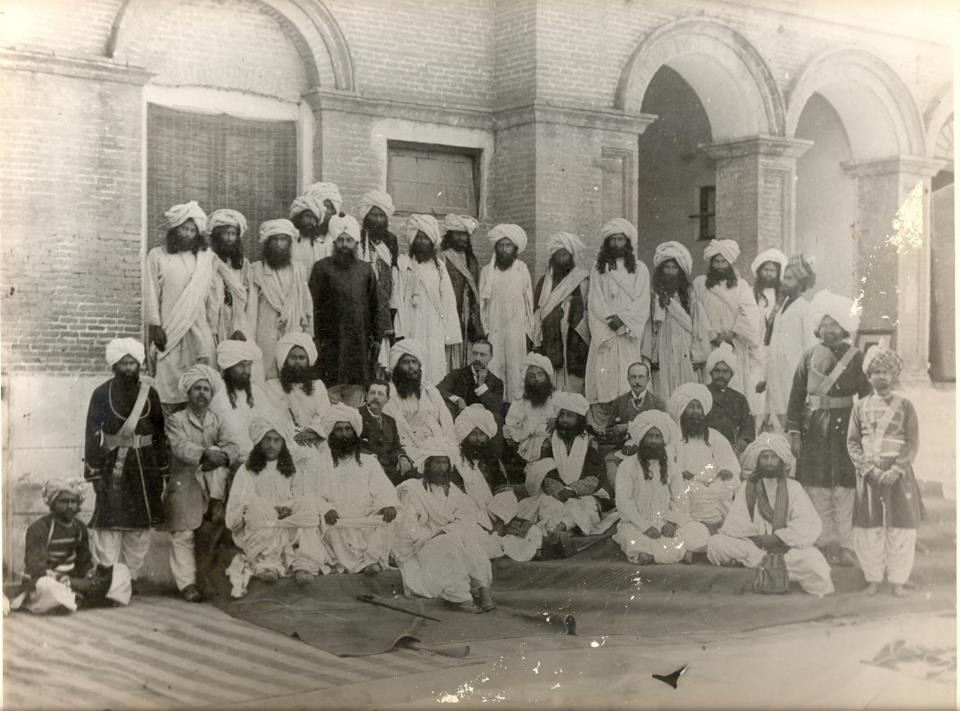
Tribal elders, April 1896

The female Balochi suit consists of the head scarf, long dress and a shalwar.

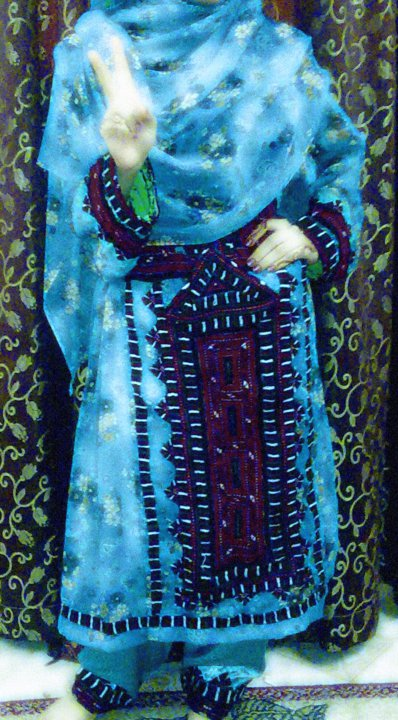
Balochi traditional dress

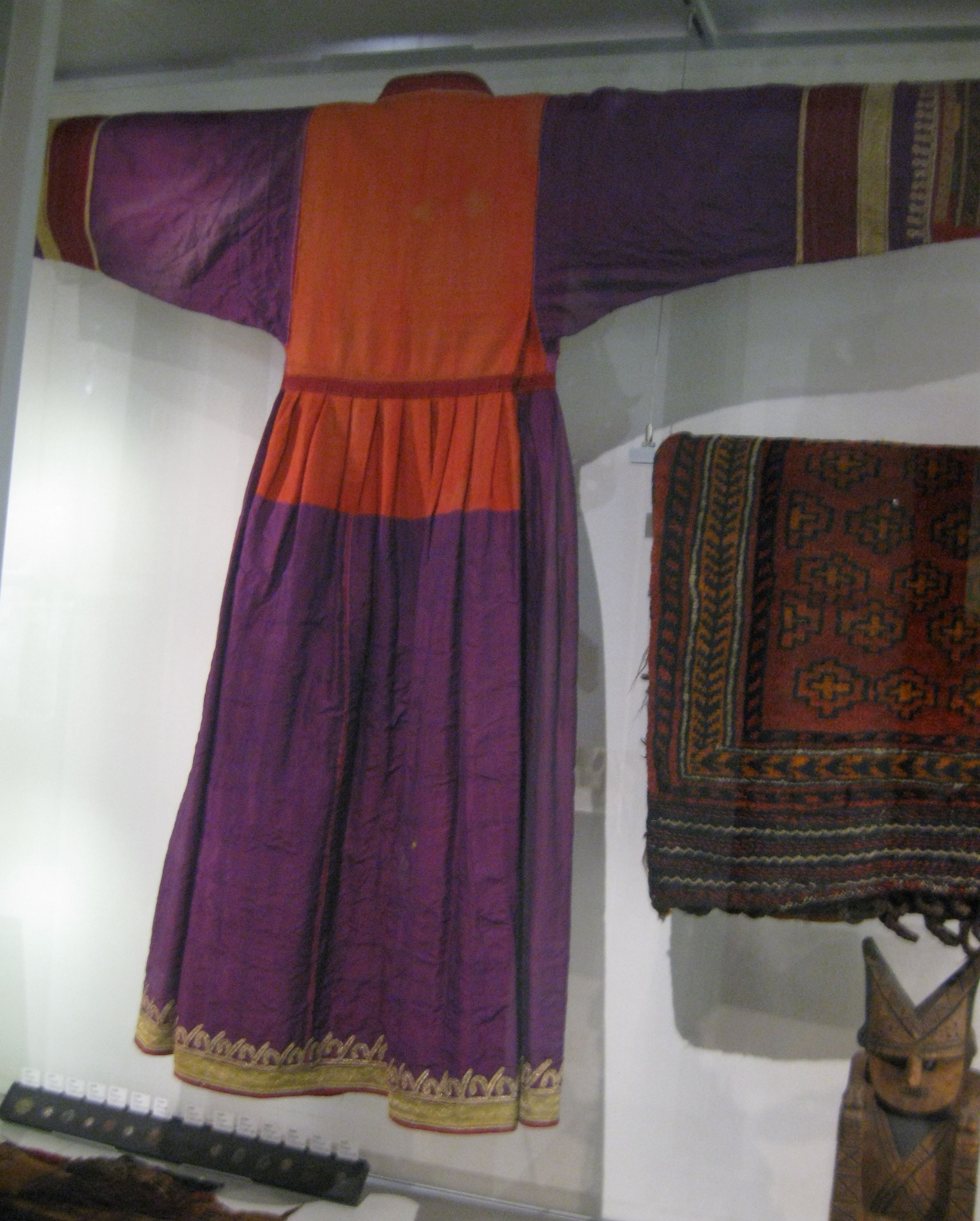
Baluchi dress

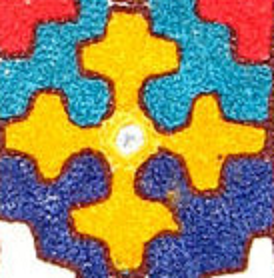
Balochi embroidery

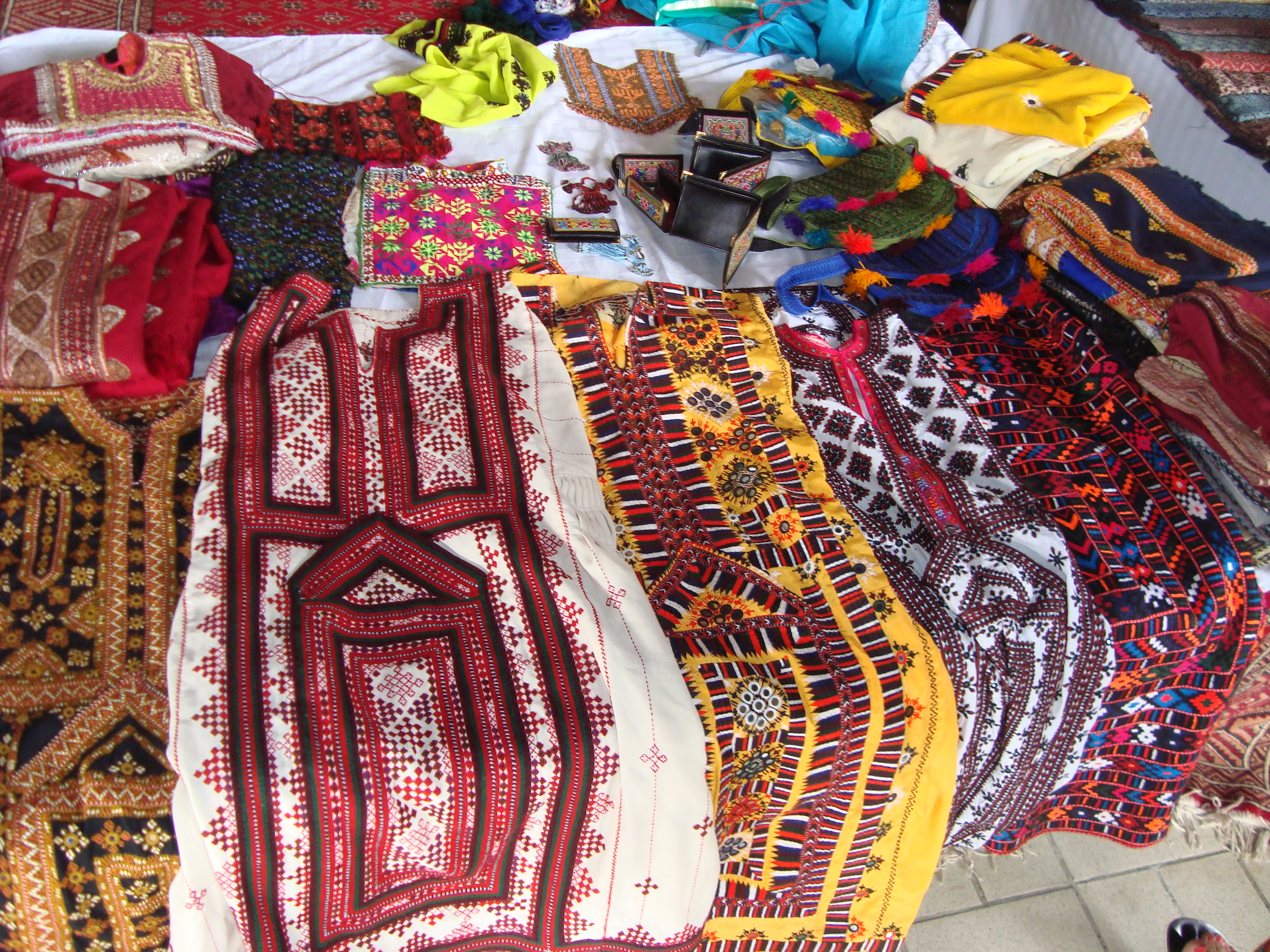
Traditional Balochi dresses

=== Phiran, poots and shalwar ===
In Kashmir, the outfit consists of the phiran, poots and shalwar.

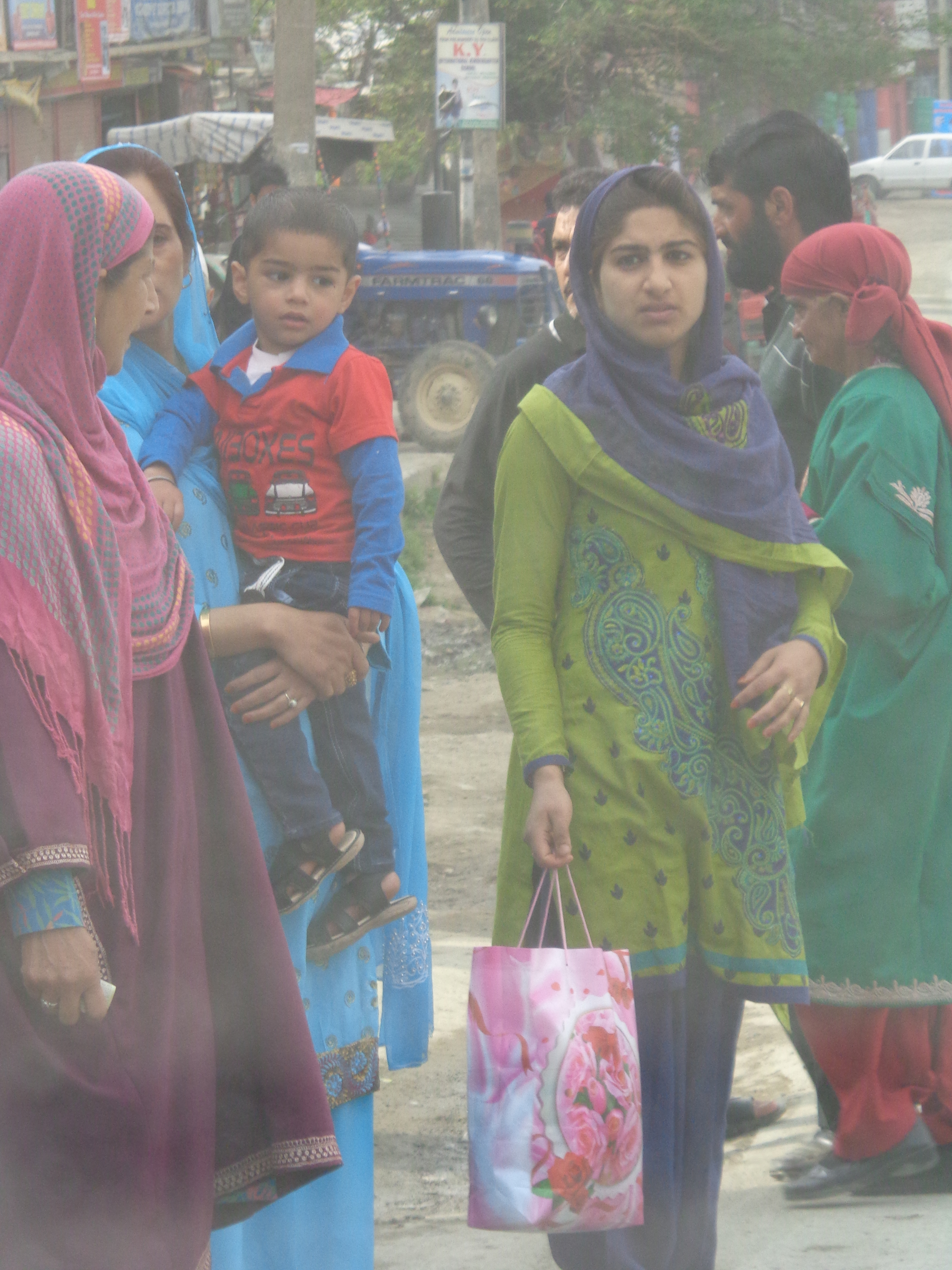
Left and right: phiran shalwar; centre: Punjabi suits

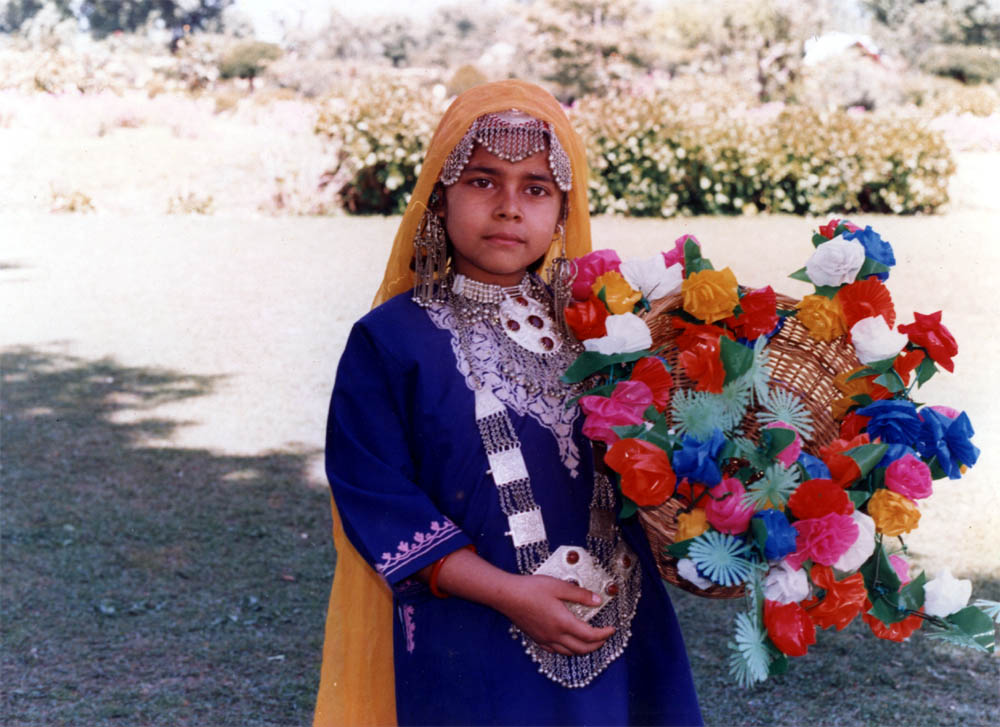
Kashmiri phiran

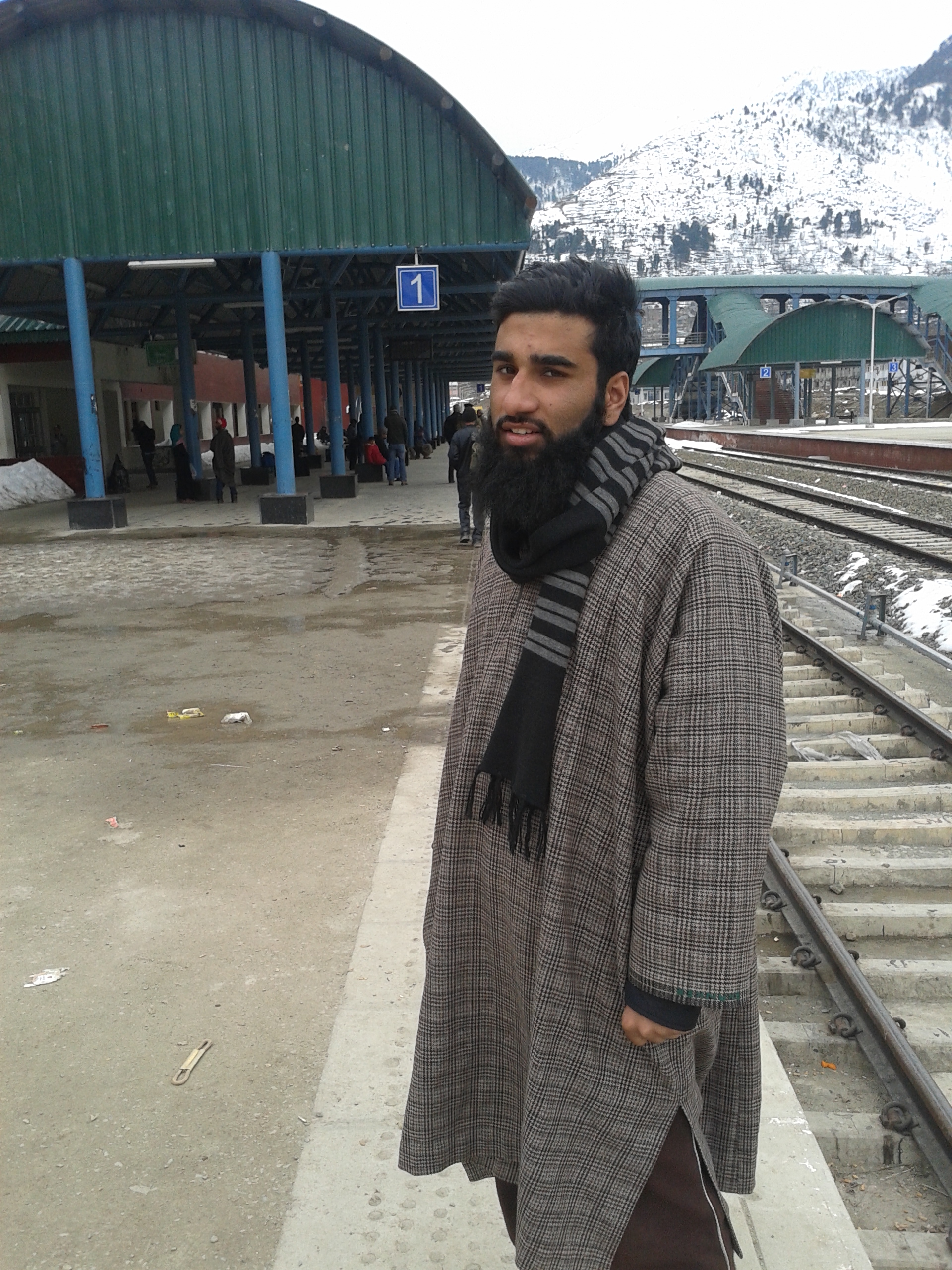
A man from Srinagar wearing phiran

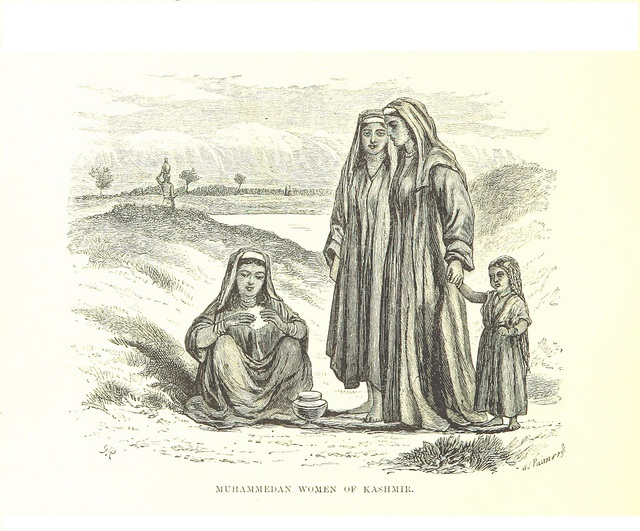
Kashmiri women in traditional long phiran 1870

Kashmiri Pandits in phiran and pyjama

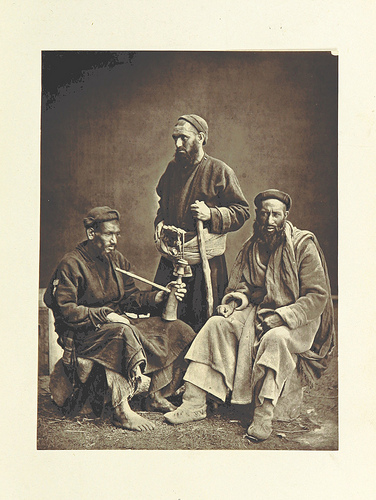
Men in Kashmiri phiran and poots, 1875

=== Punjabi suits ===
The traditional shalwar kameez worn in the Punjab region is cut differently to the styles worn in Balochistan and Afghanistan and is known as a "Punjabi suit" with the kameez being cut straight and flat with side slits (which is a local development as earlier forms of kameez did not have side slits). The shalwar is wide at the top but fits closely to the legs and is gathered at the ankles. The Punjabi shalwar is also cut straight and gathered at the ankles with a loose band reinforced with coarse material. In rural Punjab, the shalwar is still called the suthan, which is a different garment that was popular in previous centuries, alongside the churidar and kameez combination (which is still popular). In Britain, British Asian women from the Punjab region of the Indian subcontinent have brought the dress to the mainstream, and even high-fashion, appeal. The Punjabi suit is popular in other regions of the Indian subcontinent, such as Mumbai and Sindh. The popularity of Punjabi suits in India was extentuated during the 1960s through Hindi cinema. Punjabi suits are also popular among young women in Bangladesh and are especially popular amongst school girls in India. The outfit is also popular in Afghanistan, where it is called the Punjabi.

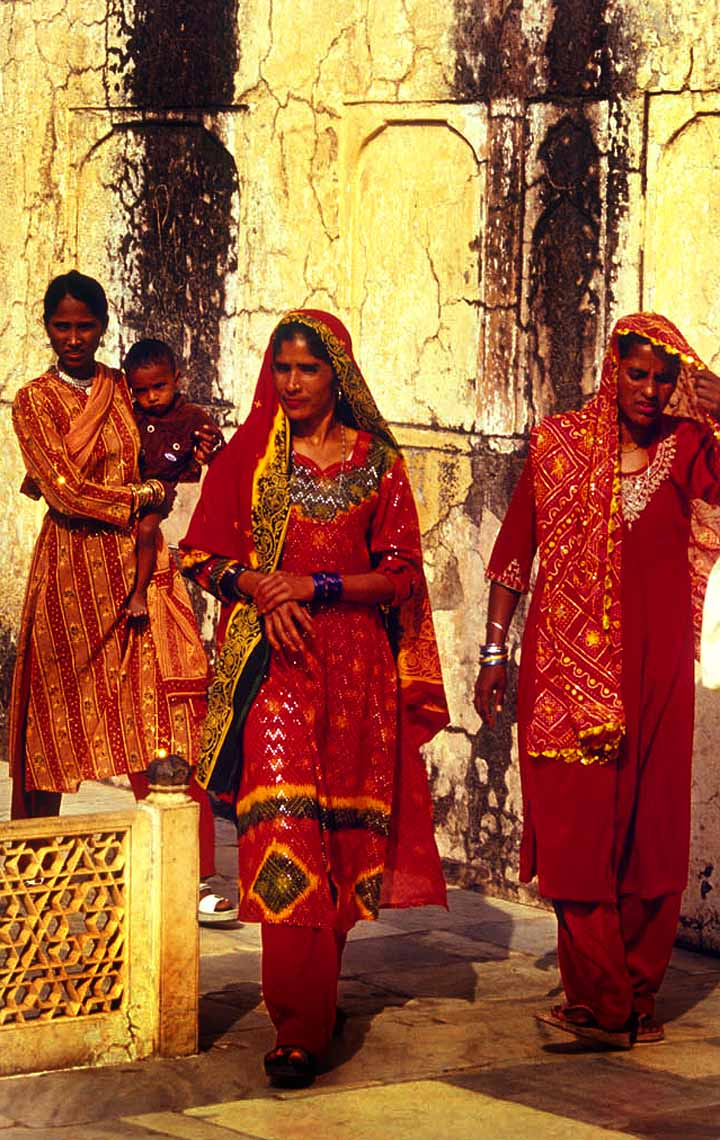
Punjabi Shalwar kameez

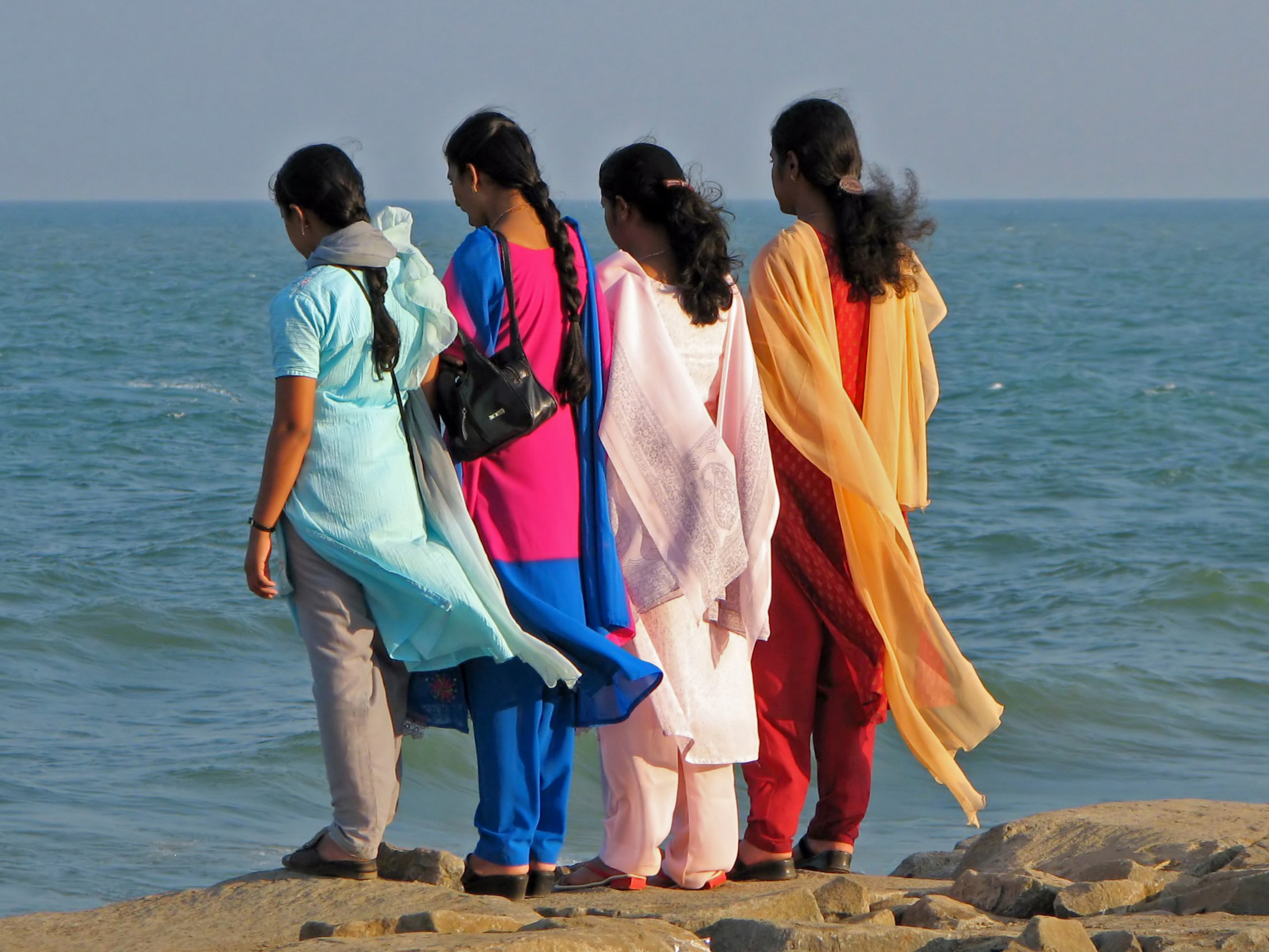
Women in Punjabi suits

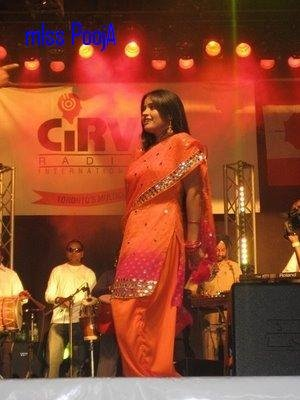
Miss Pooja of the Punjab region in a Punjabi suit

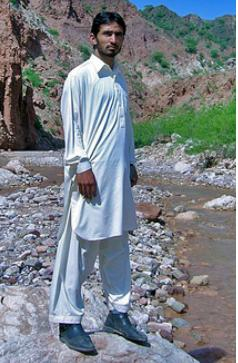
Men's Punjabi Shalwaar qamiz

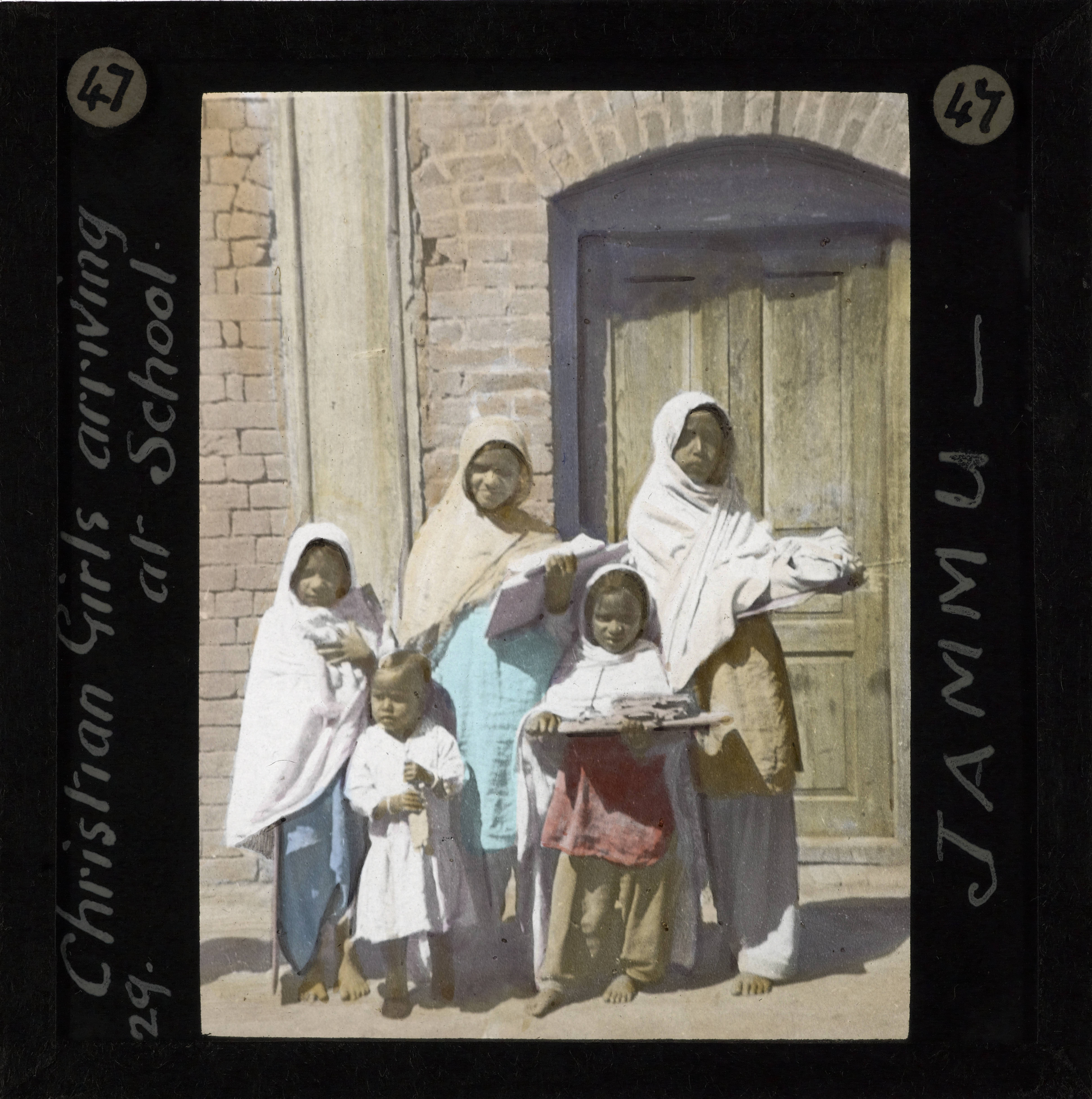
Girls arriving at school, Jammu, c. 1875 – c. 1940

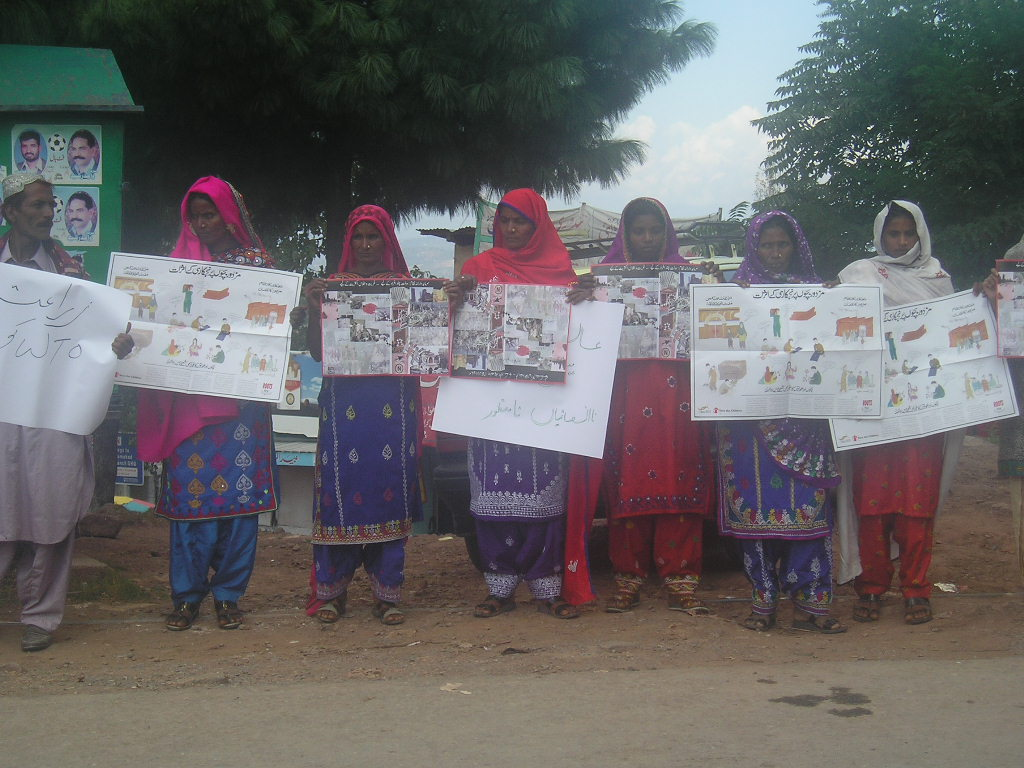
Women in ornate shalwars

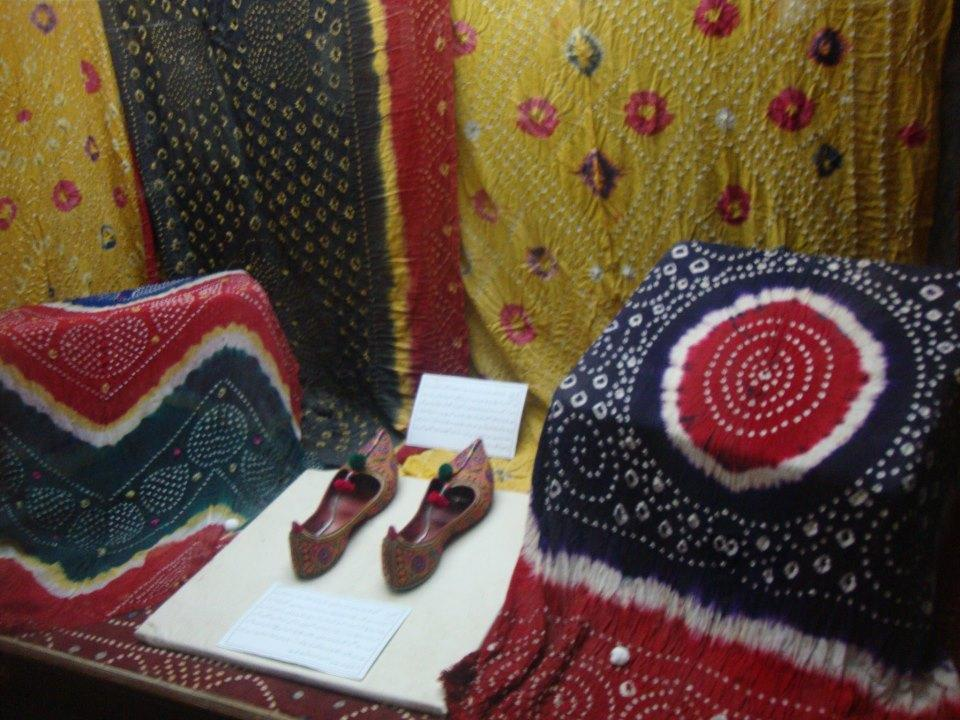
Rohi (Cholistan) woman's bandhani dress (Punjab, Pakistan)

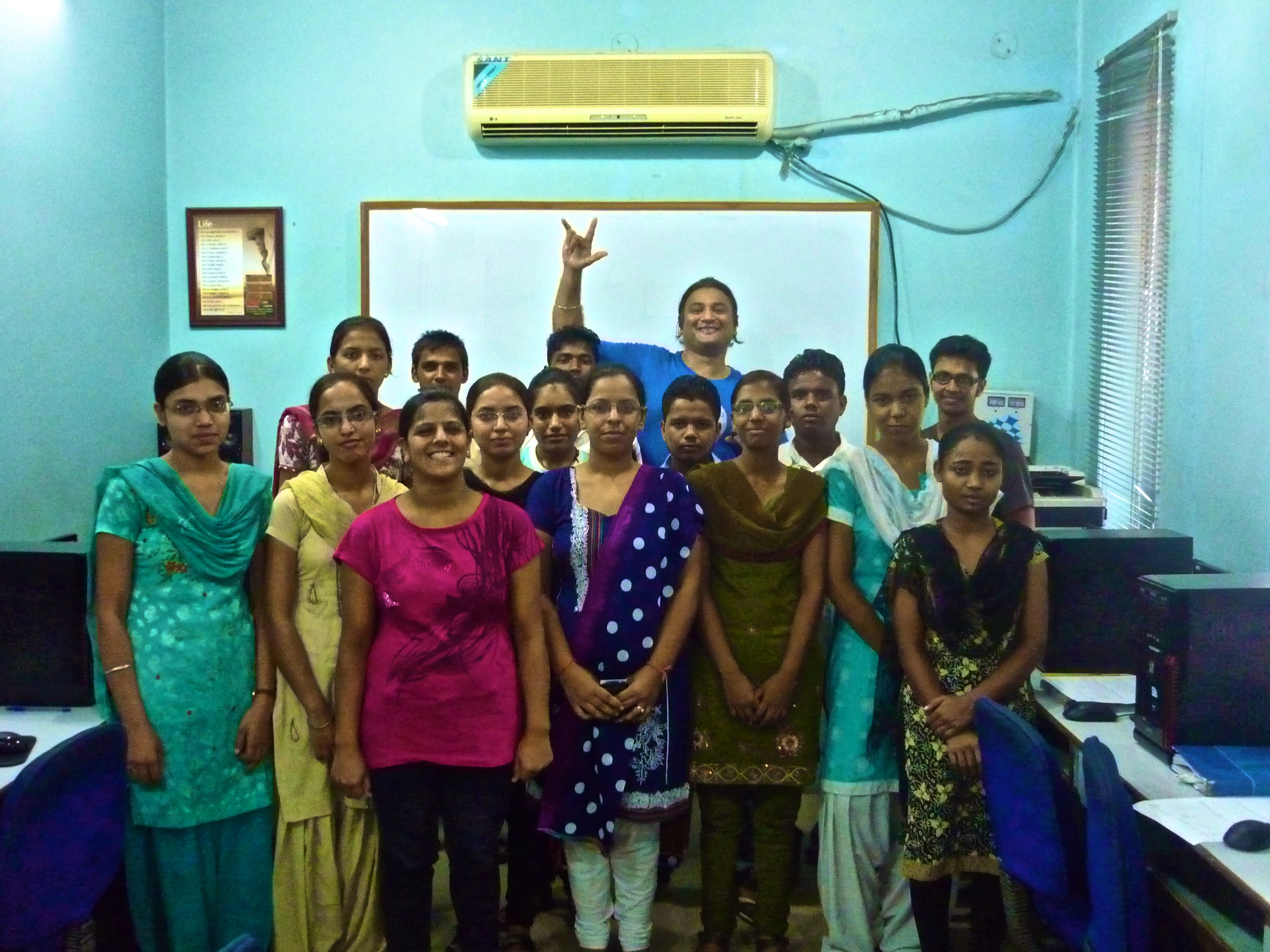
First Punjabi Wikipedia Workshop: women in Punjabi suits

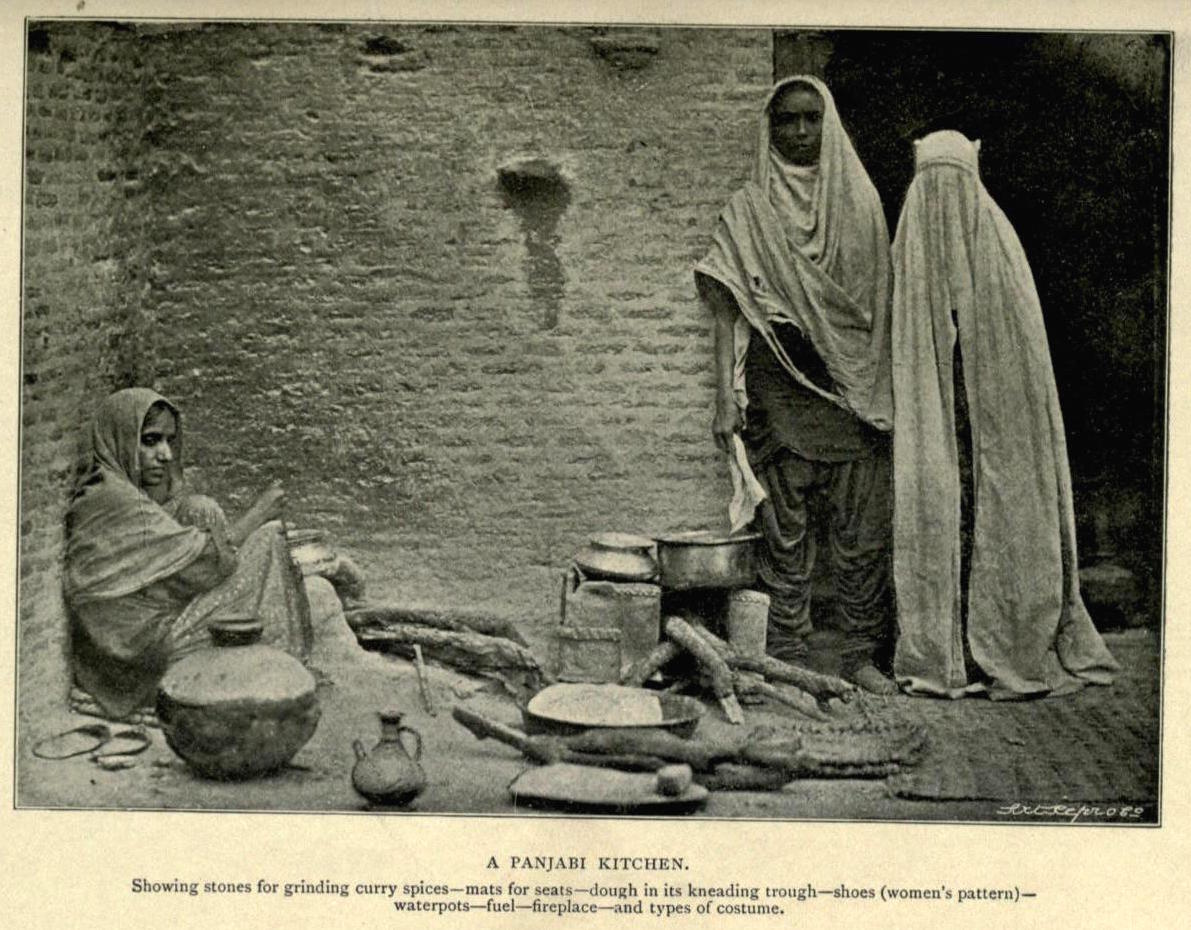
Women wearing traditional clothes in a Punjabi kitchen: 1899

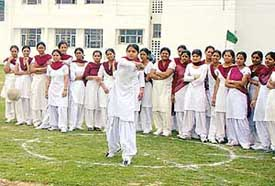
School girls wearing Patiala salwar suits

Another common type of Punjabi shalwar kameez is the Patiala salwar which has many folds and originates in the city of Patiala.

Another style of the Punjabi suit is the use of the shalwar which hails from the Pothohar region of Punjab, Pakistan, and is known as the Pothohari shalwar. The Pothohari shalwar retains the wideness of the older Punjabi suthan and also has some folds. The kameez is also wide. The head scarf is traditionally large, similar to the chador or phulkari that was used throughout the plains of the Punjab region.

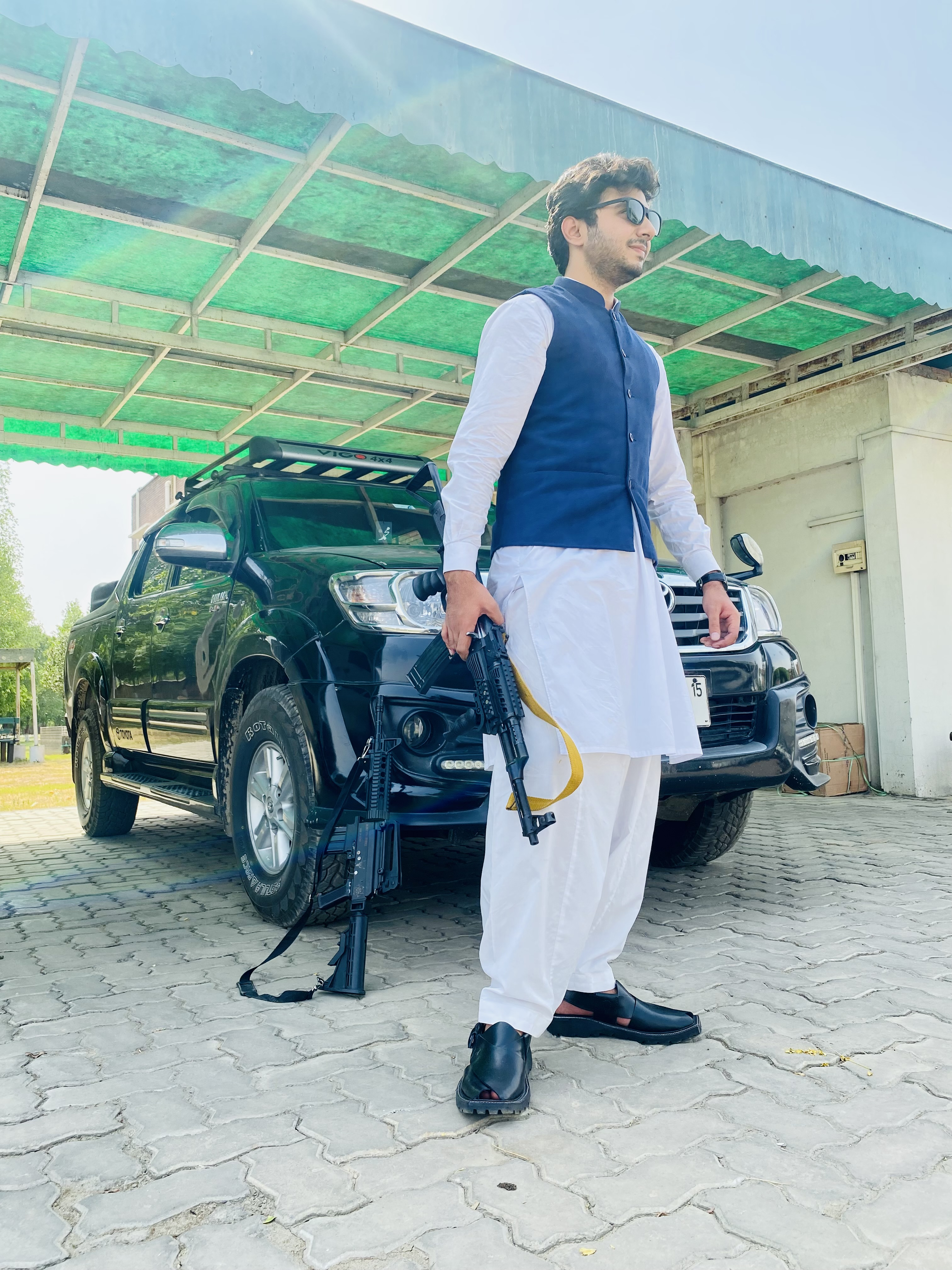
A Pakistani man in Pothohari shalwar suit

Saraiki shalwar suits are Punjabi outfits which include the Bahawalpuri shalwar suit and the Multani shalwar suit.

The Bahawalpuri shalwar originates from the Bahawalpur region of Punjab, Pakistan. The Bahawalpuri shalwar is very wide and baggy with many voluminous folds. The material traditionally used for the Bahawalpuri shalwar and suthan is known as Sufi which is a mixture of cotton warp mixed with silk weft and gold threads running down the material. The other name for these types of mixed cloth is shuja khani. The Bahawalpuri shalwar is worn with the Bahawalpur style kameez, the Punjabi kurta or chola.

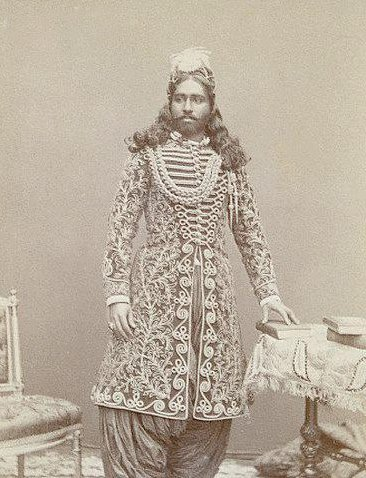
Nawab Muhammad of Bahawalpur (1868–1900) wearing a loose Bahawalpuri shalwar

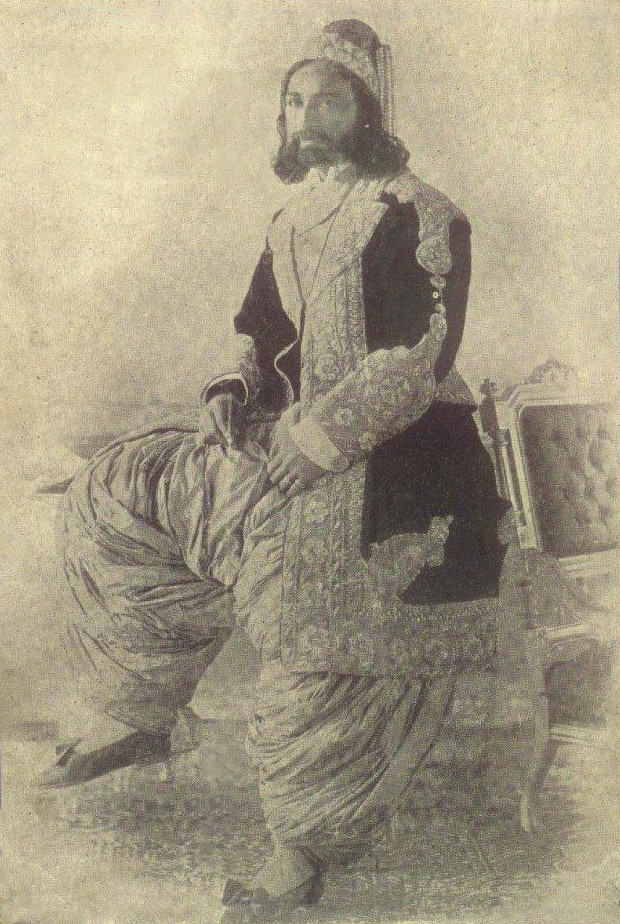
Prince Suba Sadiq Abbasi, Bahawalpur

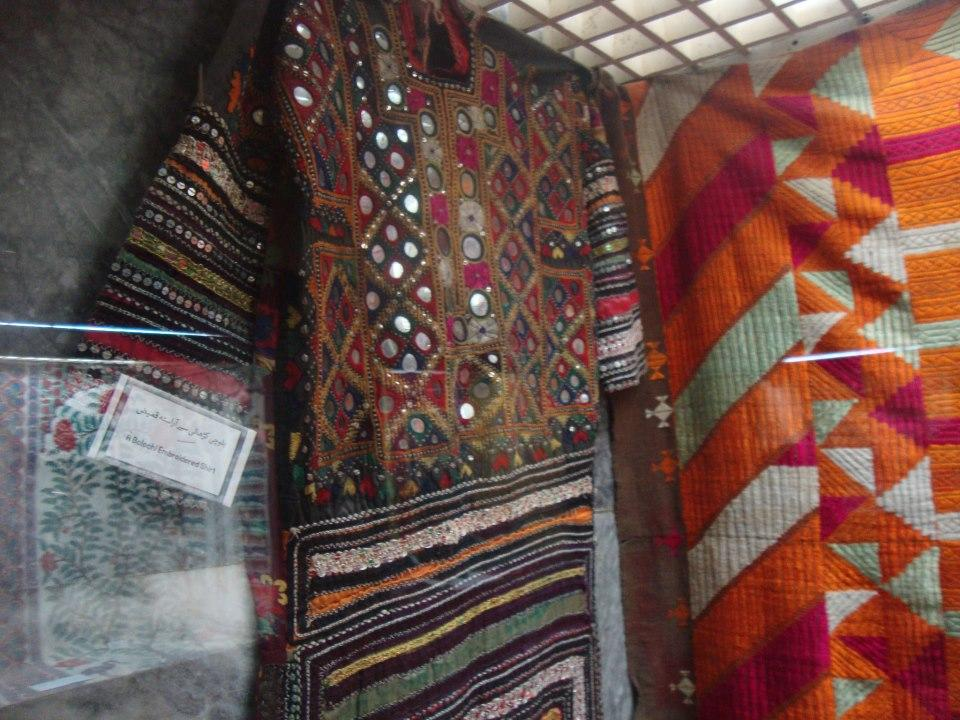
Bahawalpur kameez

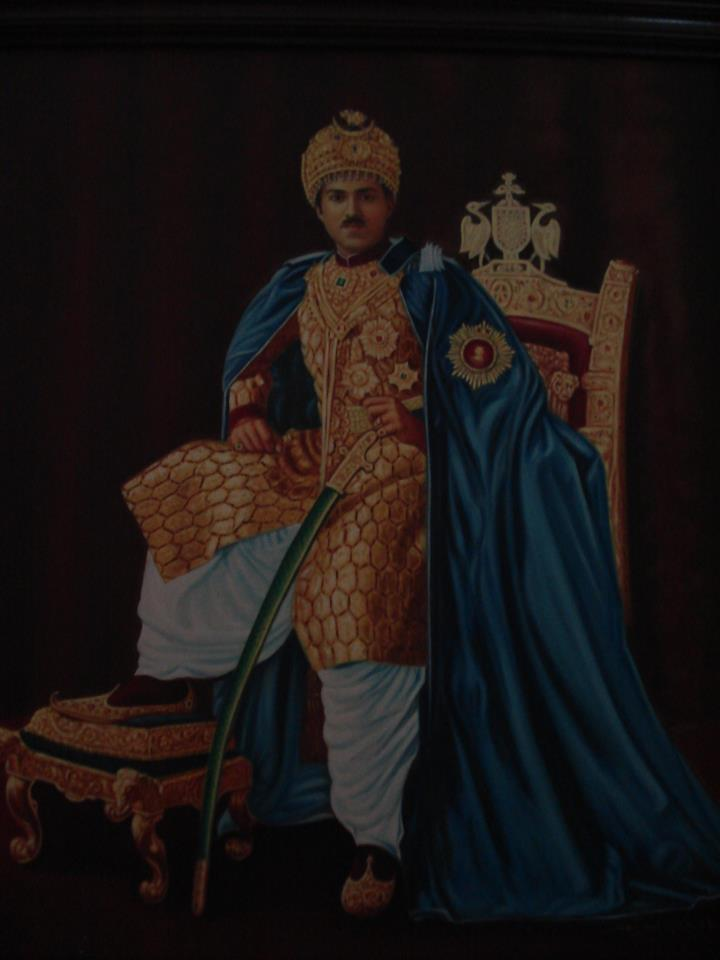
Nawab Sadiq Khan Fifth (died 1966) in the Bahawalpuri shalwar

The Multani shalwar, also known as the 'ghaire wali' or 'Saraiki ghaire wali' shalwar as it is very wide around the waist, originates from the Multan area of the Punjab region. The style is similar to the Sindhi kancha shalwar as both are derivatives of the pantaloon shalwar worn in Iraq and adopted in these locations during the 7th century AD. The Multani shalwar is very wide, baggy, and full, and has folds like the Punjabi suthan. The upper garments include the Punjabi kameez and the chola of the Punjab region.

An older variety of shalwar kameez of the Punjab region is the Punjabi suthan and kurta suit. The Punjabi suthan is a local variation of the ancient svasthana tight fitting trousers which have been used in the Punjab region since the ancient period and were worn with the tunic called varbana which was tight fitting.

The Punjabi suthan is arranged in plaits and uses large amounts of material (traditionally coloured cotton with vertical silk lines, called sussi) of up to 20 yards hanging in many folds. The suthan ends at the ankles with a tight band which distinguishes the suthan from a shalwar. The modern equivalent of the loose Punjabi suthan are the cowl pants and dhoti shalwars which have many folds.

Some versions of the Punjabi suthan tighten from the knees down to the ankles (a remnant of the svasthana). If a tight band is not used, the ends of the suthan fit closely around the ankles. The Jodhpuri breeches devised during the 1870s by Sir Pratap Singh of Jodhpur offer a striking slim line resemblance to the centuries-old tight Punjabi suthan, although the churidar is cited as its source. The tight pantaloon style suthan was popular with the Indian Cavalry during the 19th and early 20th centurie; they were dyed in Multani mutti or mitti (clay/fuller's earth), which gave the garments a yellow colour.

The kurta is a remnant of the 11th-century female kurtaka which was a shirt extending to the middle of the body with side slits worn in parts of north India which has remained a traditional garment for women in Punjab, albeit longer than the kurtaka. The suthan was traditionally worn with a long kurta but can also be worn with a short kurti or frocks. Modern versions of the kurta can be knee length. The head scarf is also traditionally long but again, modern versions are shorter

The outfit in Jammu is the Dogri kurta and suthan. When the tight part of the suthan, up to the knees, has multiple close fitting folds, the suthan is referred to as Dogri pants or suthan, in Jammu, and churidar suthan in the Punjab region and some parts of Himachal Pradesh.

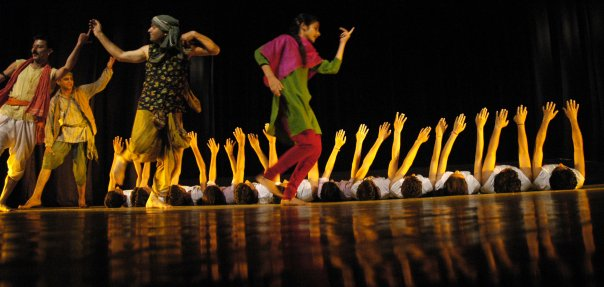
Men and boys wearing a knee length variation of the Punjabi ghuttana and Dogri kurta. The full suthan is tight from the knees to the ankles, associated with the Punjab region.

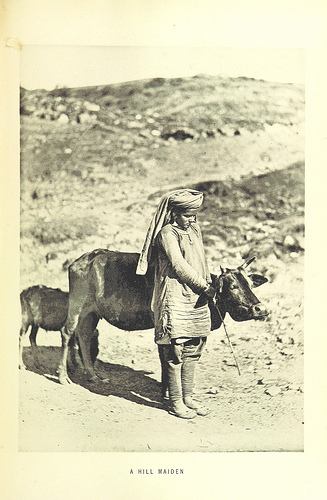
Punjab Hills 1895, Kulu woman in churidar suthan, Himachal Pradesh

=== Sindhi suits ===
The traditional Sindhi Shalwar Kameez or (Suthan ain Khamis) in Sindhi are of different styles, The Sindhi Shalwar worn by men are of three types, one is called Suthan/Salwar which is wide at waist and gets narrow below the knees till ankles where there are loosely fitted (Pācha) cuffs, it is worn mostly in upper/north of Sindh. The second type of Shalwar is (Kancha) which used to be worn usually in lower/south of Sindh and was wide down the knees till ankles where there are wider ankles (Pācha), Kancha is mostly not worn anymore or if ever worn then it does not have the that much wide ankles as the original one. The Sindhi Suthan and Kancha usually have less pleats, The third style of Shalwar is modern Sindhi suthan/salwar which do not have any pleats but is loose like pyjamas, while some men wear Gairwari Salwar, which has many pleats and is voluminous. All the shalwars are tied at waist by Agath (drawstring) which is made of different bright colours heavily ornated and embellished with shiny metallic threads, beads, mirrors etc. The Salwar and Kancha's pleats are created by bringing the folds together on opposite sides. The Khamis is also made of different styles, originally Sindhi men used to wear either short or long Angrakho which was tied at either side or in middle, the shorter one was called Angelo, and was worn by common people, the longer ones were worn by Soldiers, government officials and noblemen, other style was called Kiriyo/Puthiyo, then the short Kurtas (tunics) called (Pehrān/Pehriyān) were commonly worn, which used to be collarless like Angrakho and was tied at either side or in middle, and had half way slit opening in front unlike angrakhas which used to be completely slit in front. The Angrakho and Pehrān/Pehriyān were also used to be embroidered with Sindhi bhart and mirrorwork. Above Angelo and Pehrān some men also wore (Koti, Sadri, Gidi, Kaba) which can also be sometimes embroidered with mirrors usually borders and a heart shape design on back having initials of first and last name of wearer. while underneath the Angelo, Pehran and Khamis men wear Ganji (vest) which is also heavily embroidered with Sindhi stitches and mirrors. During British Raj, the colllars were introduced in Sindh, the Sindhi men started wearing Pehran with collars and buttons, also during that time the english long coats and jackets were introduced which were worn over local clothing. The upper garment of Sindhi men was mostly short either till hips or till midway to thighs, except for some rich men, but the modern Khamis reaches at least till knees, the modern Khamis can have (Gol daman) round cut at end corners or (Chokor Daman) square cut, this is now a everydays clothing of Sindhi men. The clothes are adorned with Ajrak and topi or Patko (Turbans), but usually on everyday life, a various coloured floral, checkered or plain piece of cloth with Sindhi embroideries and mirrors is carried over shoulders or as turban, also used as a (rumal) handkerchief, and for the protection from the heat of sun, while during winters locally wool made shawls of different styles like Loi, Katho, Khes etc are used for warming.

Sindhi women of Sindh wear Salwar/Suthan which is almost similar those worn by men, but back in time some women of lower Sindh used to wear a very baggy Salwars called "Chareno" but these are not normally worn anymore. Many Sindhi women also wore churidar pajamo (Sohri Suthan). Traditional Sindhi women Suthan and Pajamo are made of bright colours and rich fabrics like soosi, silk, satin, velvets and brocades which are heavily embroidered at ankles (Pācha). The Salwars are worn with the Cholo (tunics) or Ghagho, Abho (different frocks) which are also heavily intricately embroidered with Sindhi bhart and other embellishments called Gaj, Aggoti, Gichi, back in time the Salwars were used to be hidden under a wide Paro/Peshgeer (Skirt), specially when a woman went outside and over the head women wore a wide and long veils called Rawo/Gandhi/Pothi/Chuni/Salur.

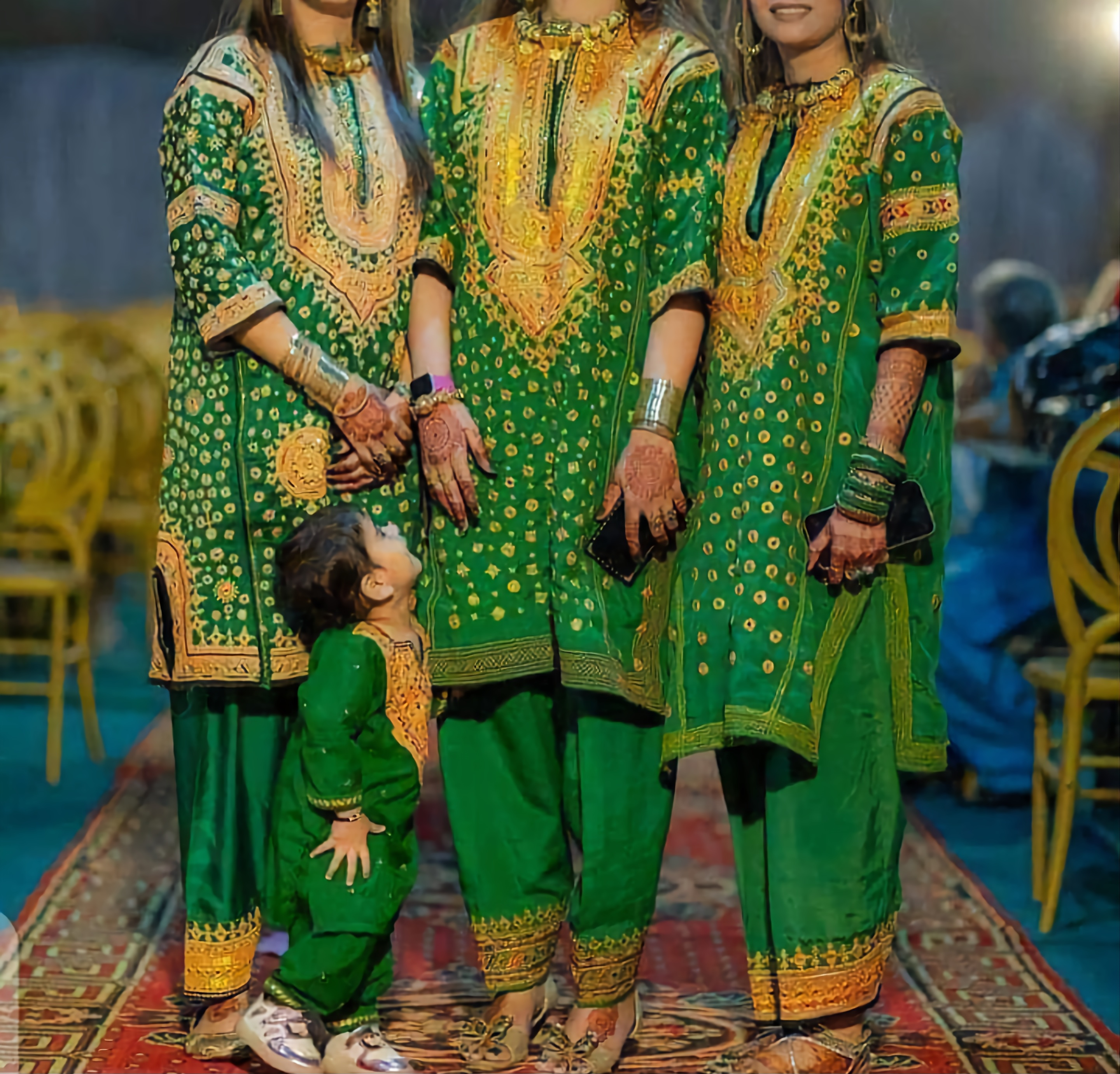
Sindhi girls wearing traditional Sindhi dress, worn by Soomra tribe

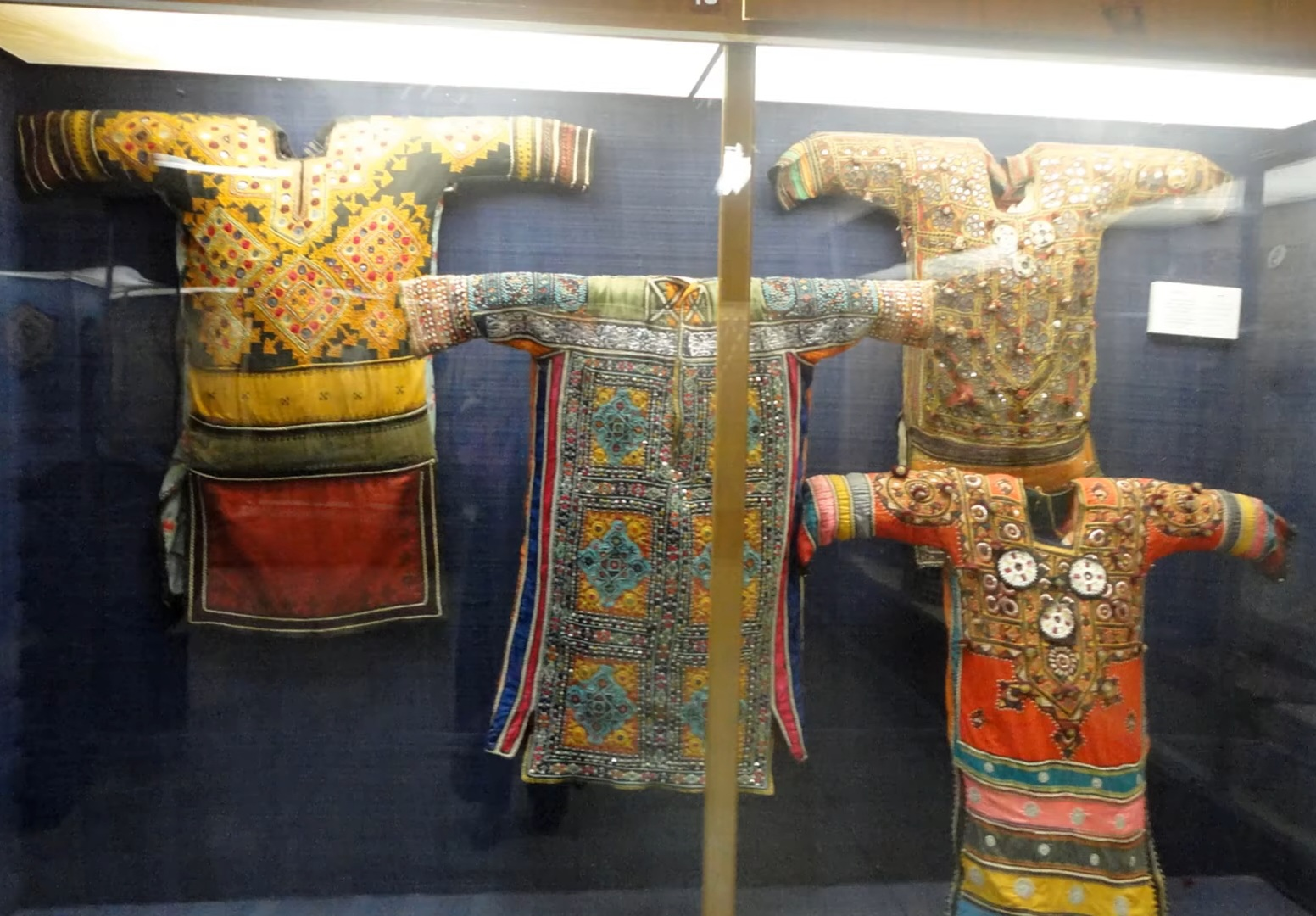
Traditional Sindhi Cholo with heavy embroidered Gaj worn by Sammat group of Sindhi women

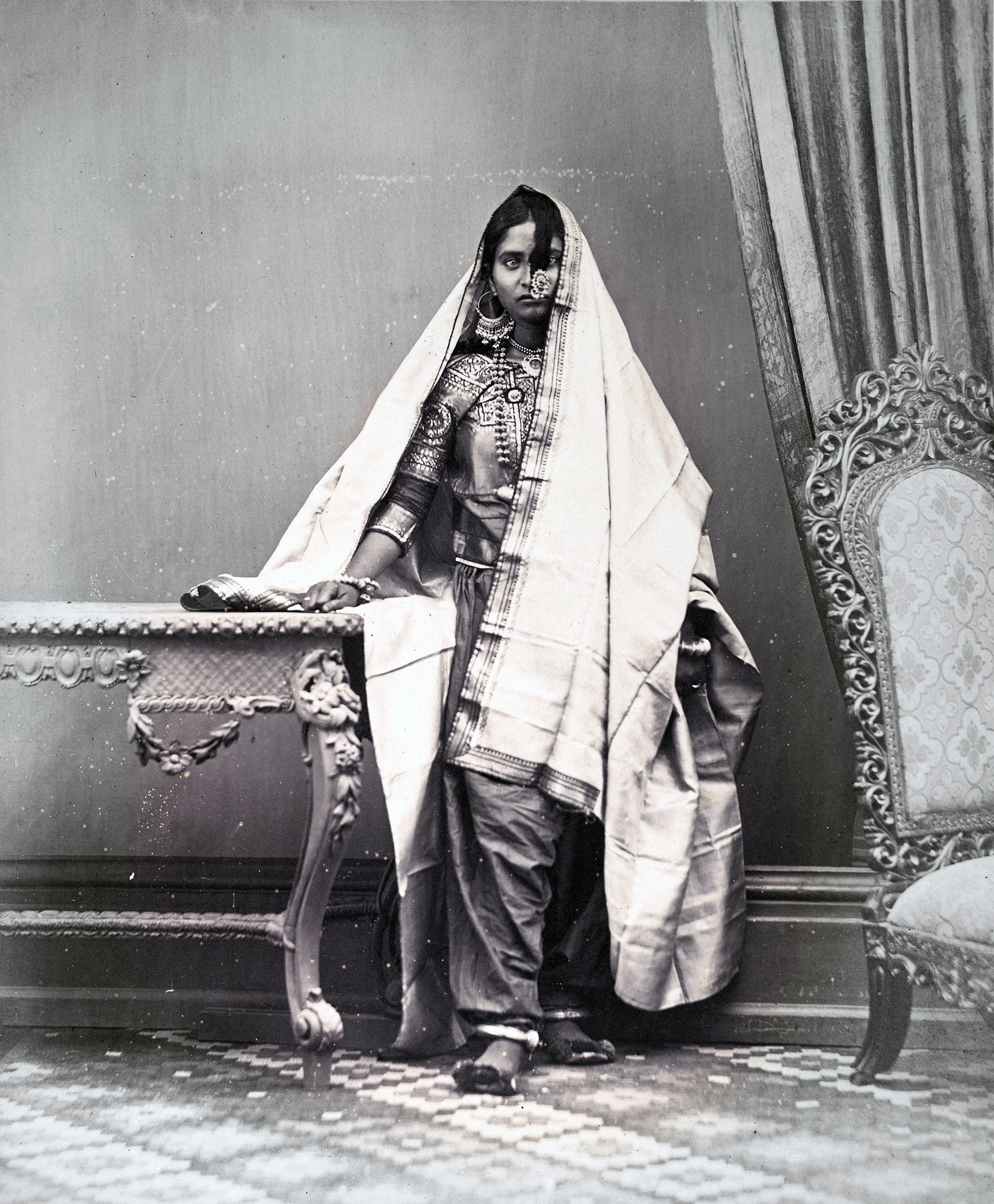
Girl from Karachi, Sindh, in a shalwar and Choli. c. 1870. Oriental and India Office Collection, British Library.

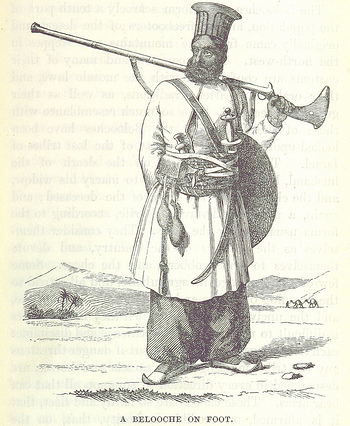
Man in Sindhi traditional Suthan Shalwar

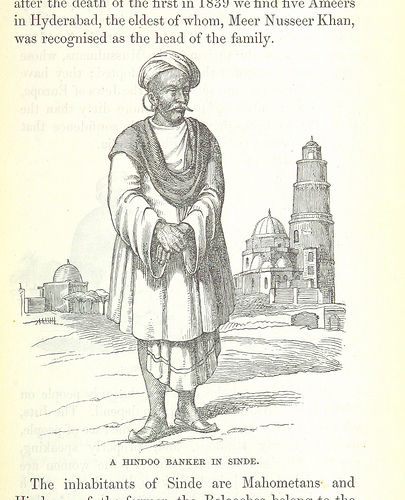
Man in Sindhi long angrakho (1845)

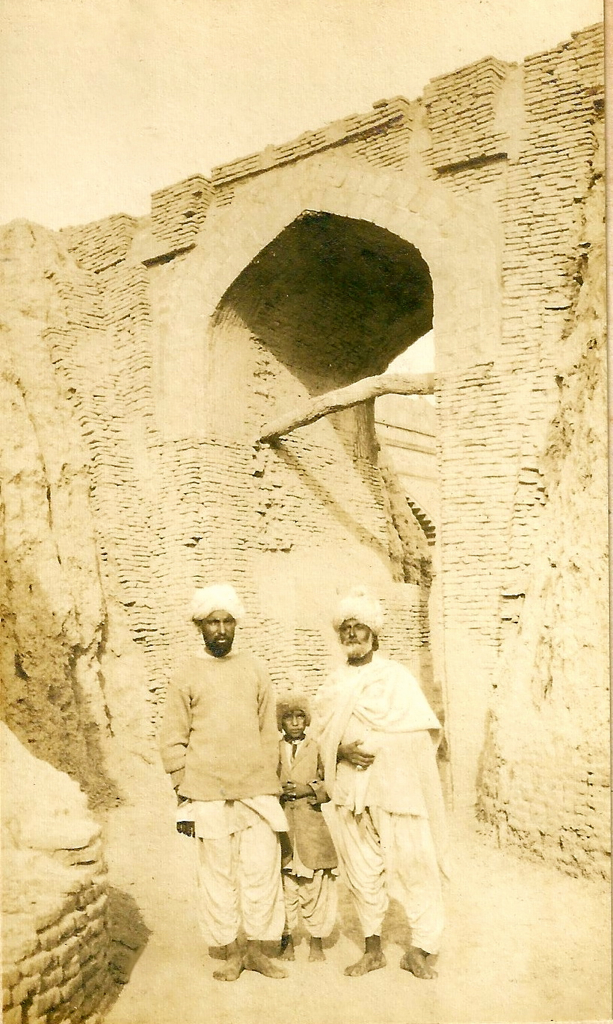
Two Sindhi men and a boy in Sindhi Suthan/Salwar, Pehran, Patka, Loi (Sindhi shawl), and cap and jacket

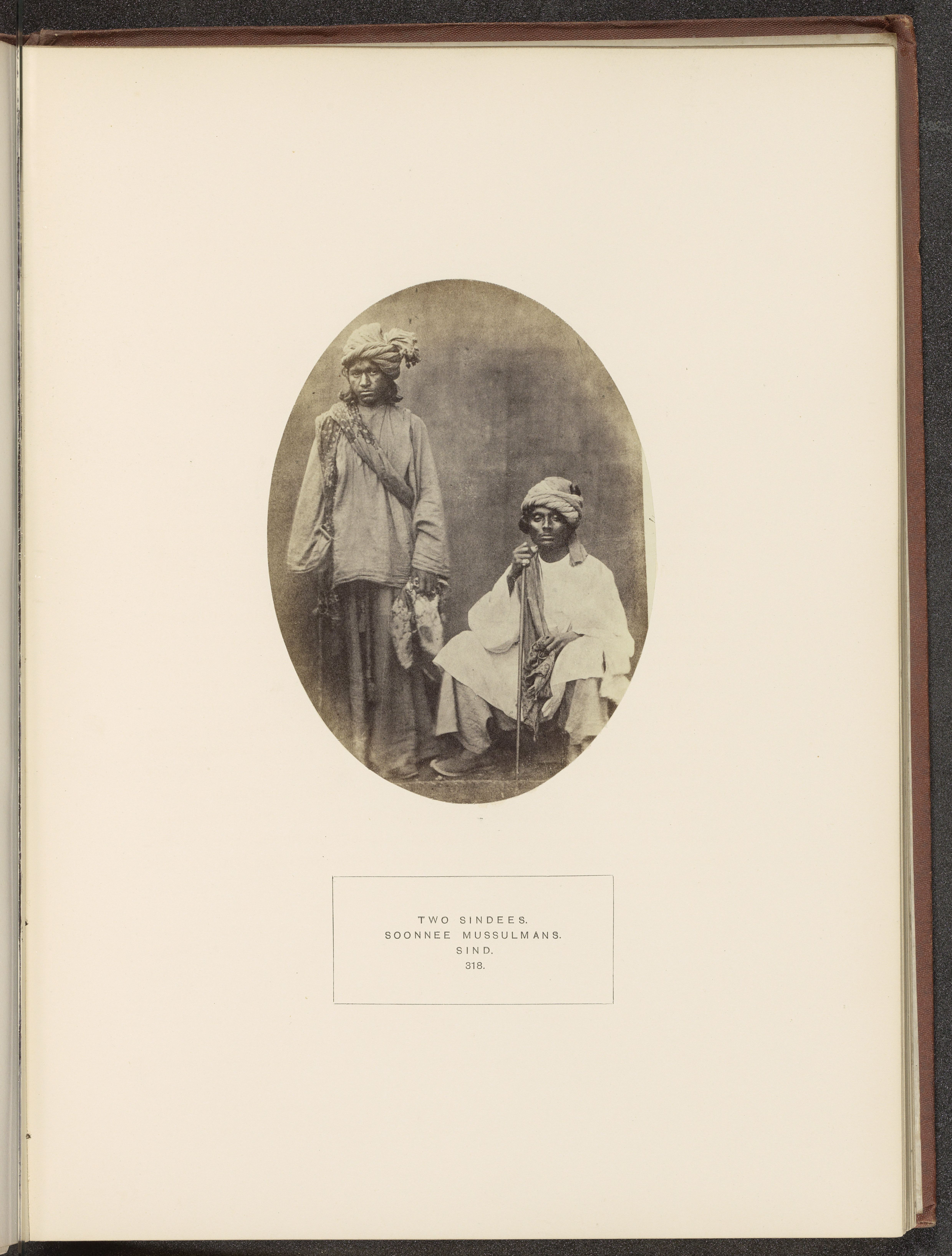
Portrait of two Sindhi men wearing Sindhi Kancha, Pehran, Ajrak and turbans on head

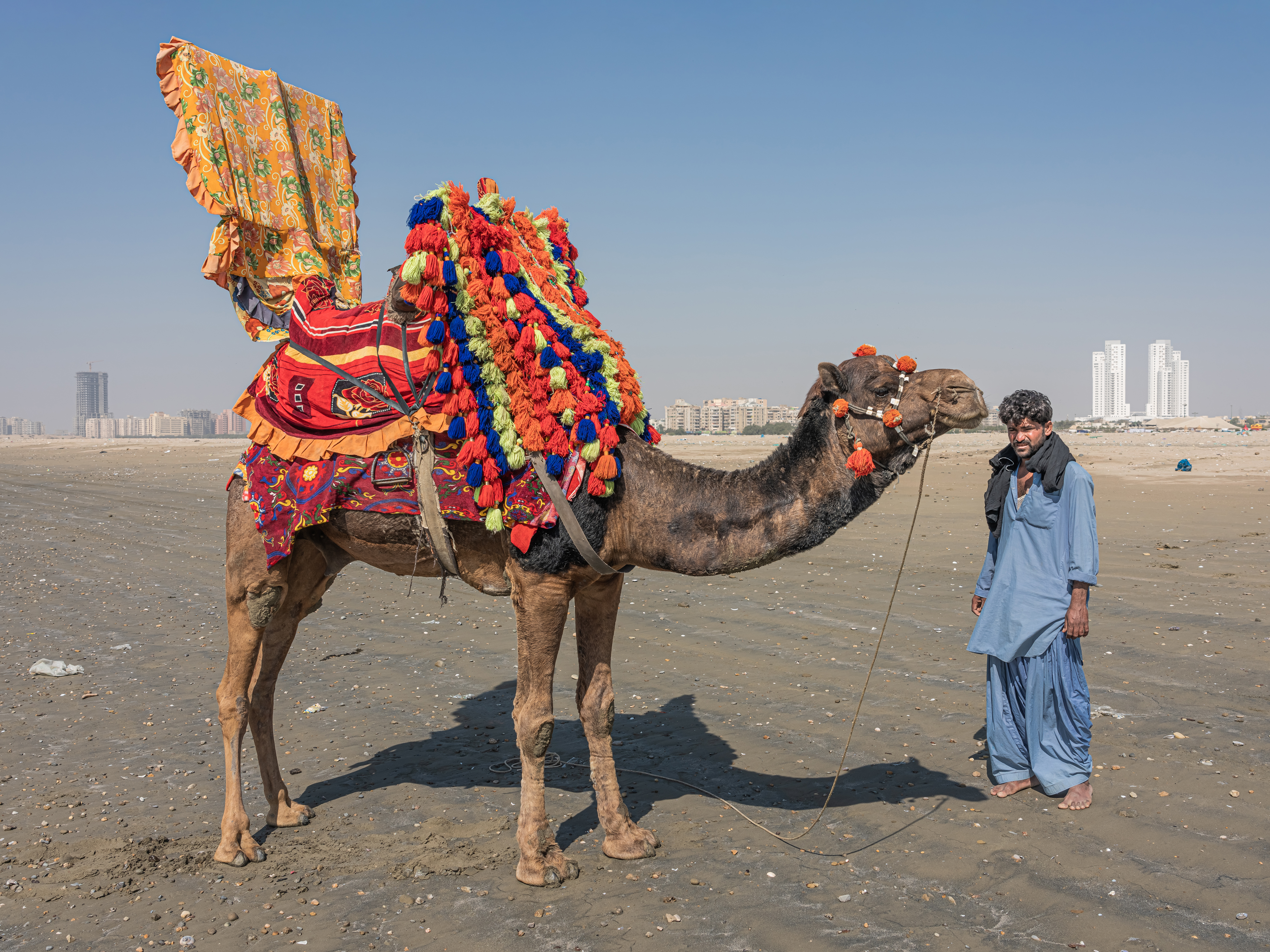
A Sindhi camel driver in Clifton Beach, wearing modern style Sindhi Kancha and Khamis and a rumal (handkerchief) on shoulder

Woman, in Sind, British India, in Sindhi Suthan shalwar

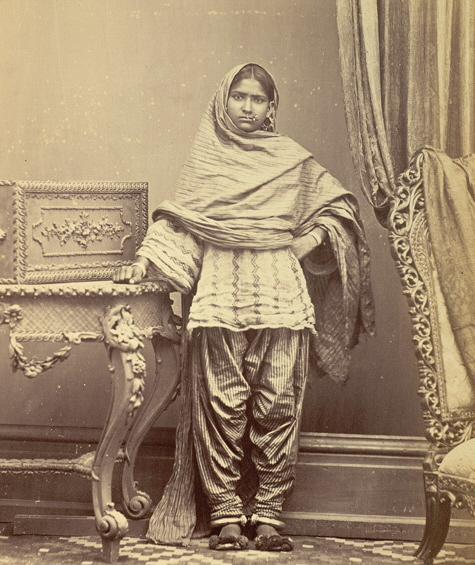
Sindhi girl from Karachi, Sind, in Sindhi ghagho like cholo and narrow suthan, c. 1870

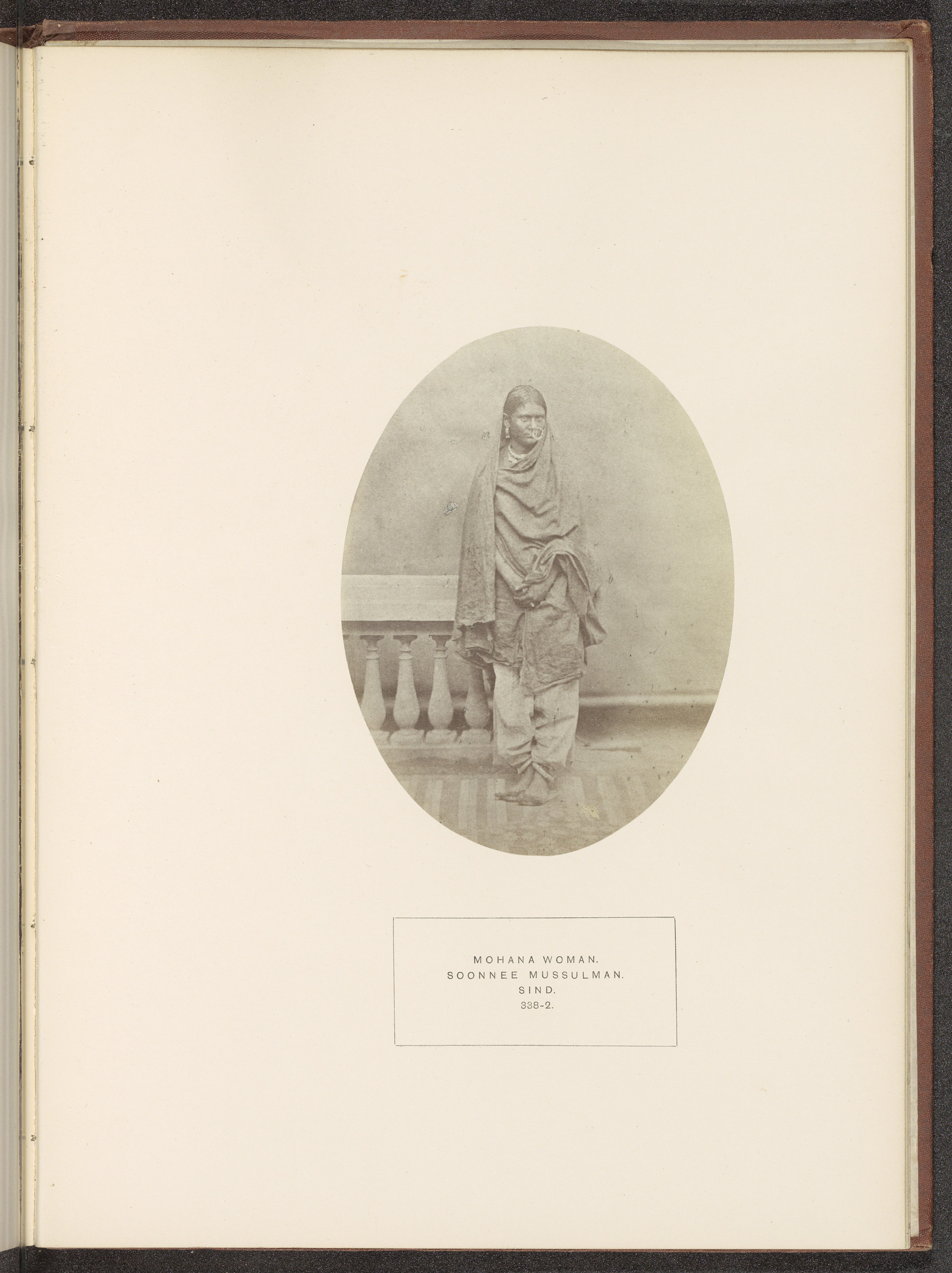
Portrait of a Mohana girl in Sindhi Salwar

== See also ==
- Áo dài
- Anarkali salwar kameez
- Churidar
- Khetpartug
- Pencil suit
- Perahan o tunban
- Pheran
- Salwar
- Saraiki shalwar suits
- Turkish salvar
- Punjabi clothing

== General and cited references ==
- Bachu, Parminder (2004), Dangerous Designs: Asian Women Fashion the Diaspora Economies, London: Routledge. Pp. xii, 196, ISBN 0415072212, archived from the original on December 31, 2008
- Breidenbach, Joana; Pál, Nyíri; Zcaronupanov, Ines (2004), "Fashionable Books", Identities: Global Studies in Power and Culture, 11 (4): 619–628, doi:10.1080/10702890490883885, S2CID 214654975
- Walton-Roberts, Margaret; Pratt, Geraldine (2005), "Mobile Modernities: One South Asian Family Negotiates Immigration, Gender and Class in Canada", Gender, Place & Culture, 12 (2): 173–195, doi:10.1080/09663690500094823, S2CID 144322845.
