= Hazara clothing =

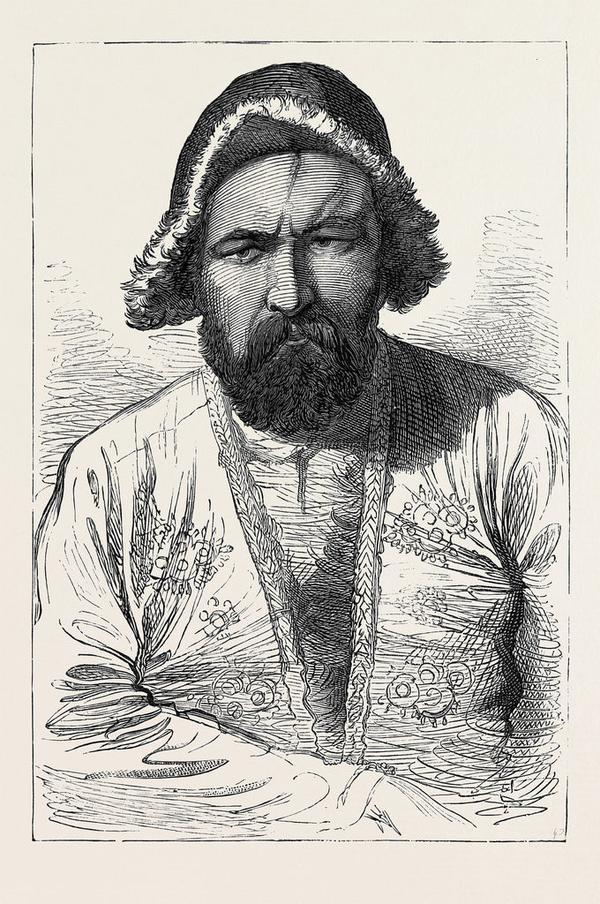
Daizangi Hazara man in traditional clothing (1879)

Hazara clothing or Hazaragi clothing (Persian: لباس هزارگی), or clothing traditionally worn by the Hazara ethnic group, has an important and special role in supporting the Hazara cultural and social identity. Hazara clothes are produced manually and by machine; in Afghanistan Hazara clothing is sewn in most parts of the country, especially in the central provinces of the country. Men often wear clothes woven from wool, while women often wear velvet or silk woven with intricate designs. Traditionally, men and women alike cover their heads. The fabrics and colors worn depend on an individual's age, gender, and class.

== Male clothing ==
Hazara men traditionally wear clothes and hats made from a manufactured fabric called barak or burruk. Barak is a kind of soft, durable and thick fabric made from the first wool of lambs of special sheep that are raised in Hazaristan (Hazarajat). Barak can be used to make moisture-resistant winter clothes and is regarded as stylish and regal cloth by the Hazaras. Barak is said to have a special softness and to reduce muscle and joint pains. Nowadays, the most common clothing item among Hazara men is the perahan o tunban.

== Female clothing ==
The traditional dress of Hazara girls is called the "Perahan tunban" or simply "Perahan". It consists of a long dress (perahan) paired with loose pants (tunban), often accompanied by a colorful shawl or scarf. The dress is usually richly embroidered, with vibrant colors and intricate patterns, reflecting Hazara culture and heritage.

The traditional clothing of Hazara women includes a pleated skirt with a tunban or undergarment. Cheaper fabrics are used for the lower skirts, while the upper are often made of better materials, such as velvet or zari, with decorative nets or borders at the bottom. The women's shirt is calf-length, close-collared, and long-sleeved, and has slits on both sides that are placed on the skirts, which are admired for their completeness in the Islamic set. Hazara women's clothing has certain characteristics according to their social, economic, and age conditions. The clothes of young Hazara women are made of different fabrics in different colours and designs with colourful chador, but older women tend towards darker-coloured fabrics and patterns. Hazara women's chador is often decorated with ornaments that are often silver or gold, and sometimes with a hat. Other ornaments include silver or gold necklaces with colourful beads, buttons, bangles, and silver or gold bracelets..

The traditional clothing of Hazara women includes a pleated skirt with a tunban or undergarment. In some regions of Afghanistan, particularly in areas where Hazaras have historically lived alongside Pashtun communities, Hazara women's dress may incorporate decorative elements and stylistic features also found and originating in Kuchi and Pashtun clothing traditions. These shared features can include colorful embroidery, beadwork, coin ornaments, jewelry, and layered garments, reflecting broader patterns of cultural interaction and exchange among Afghanistan's ethnic groups while retaining distinct Hazara characteristics. As well as this, other ethnicities in Afghanistan including Hazaras have adopted the traditional wear of Kuchi dresses, as part of the wider Afghan tradition.

== Headgear ==
Hazaras traditionally wear headgear or hats, which are of different types for men and women. There are different types of Hazara hats and caps, some of which are made from animal skin and some from barak. Some Hazara men also wear the turban of Khorasan.

== See also ==
- Afghan clothing
- Hazara culture

== Gallery ==
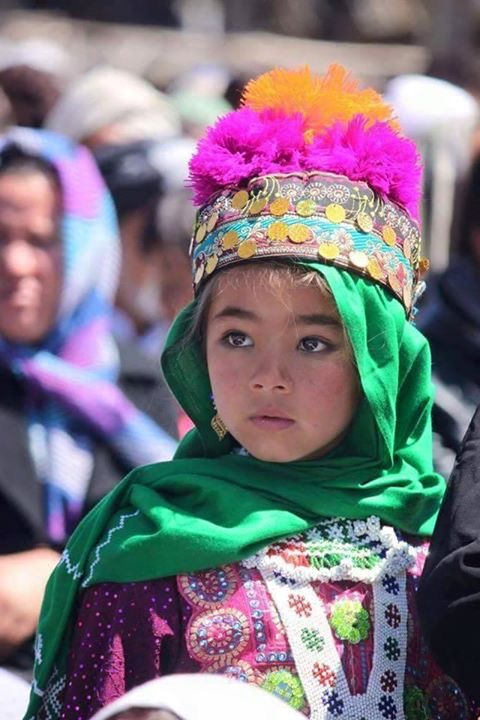
Hazara girl in a traditional clothing

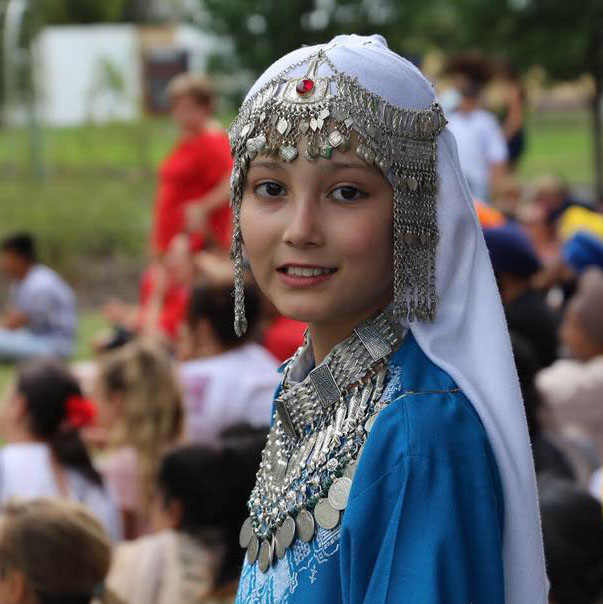
Hazara girl in a traditional clothing

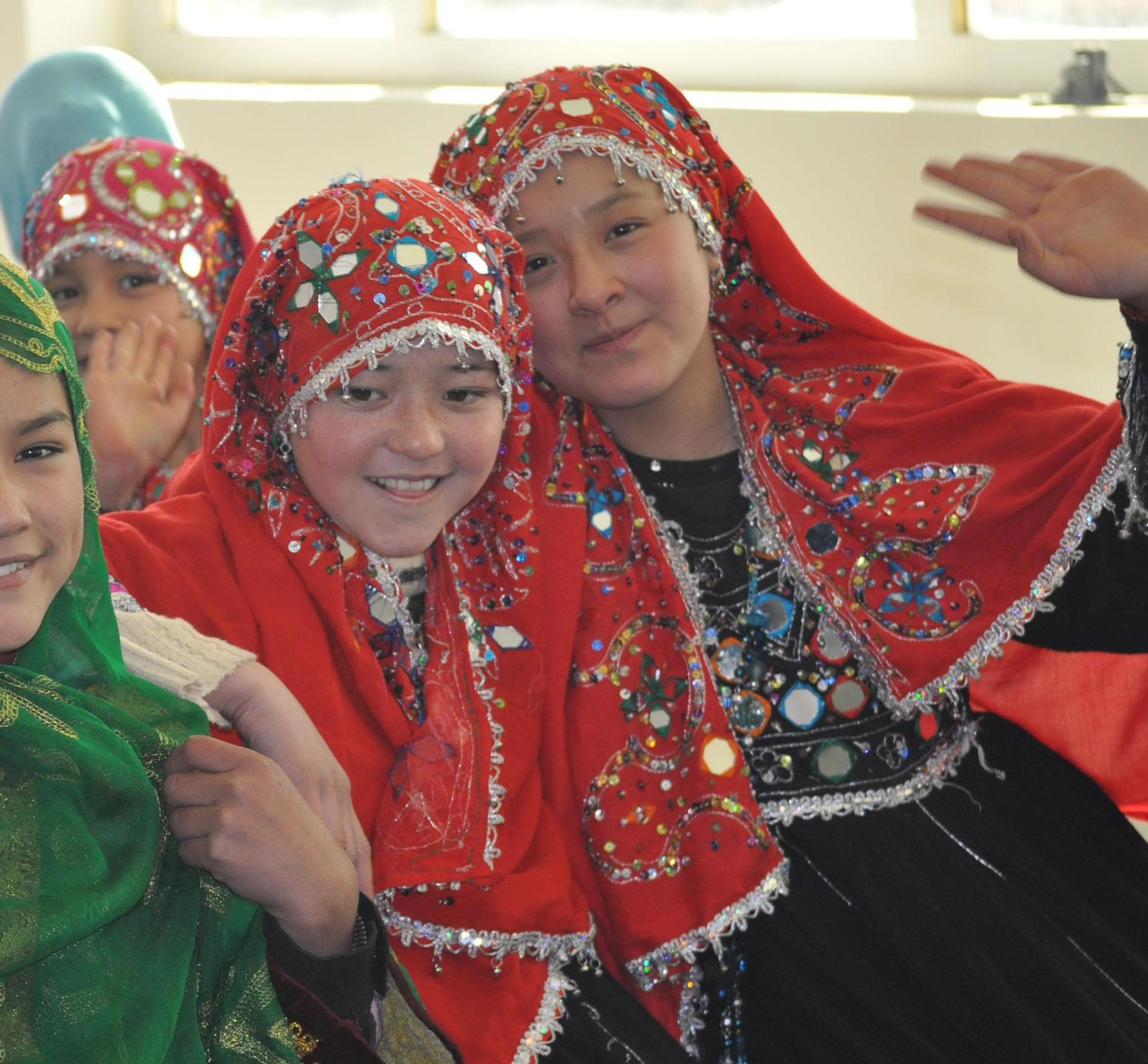
Hazara girls wearing red traditional kuchai clothes in Ghazni

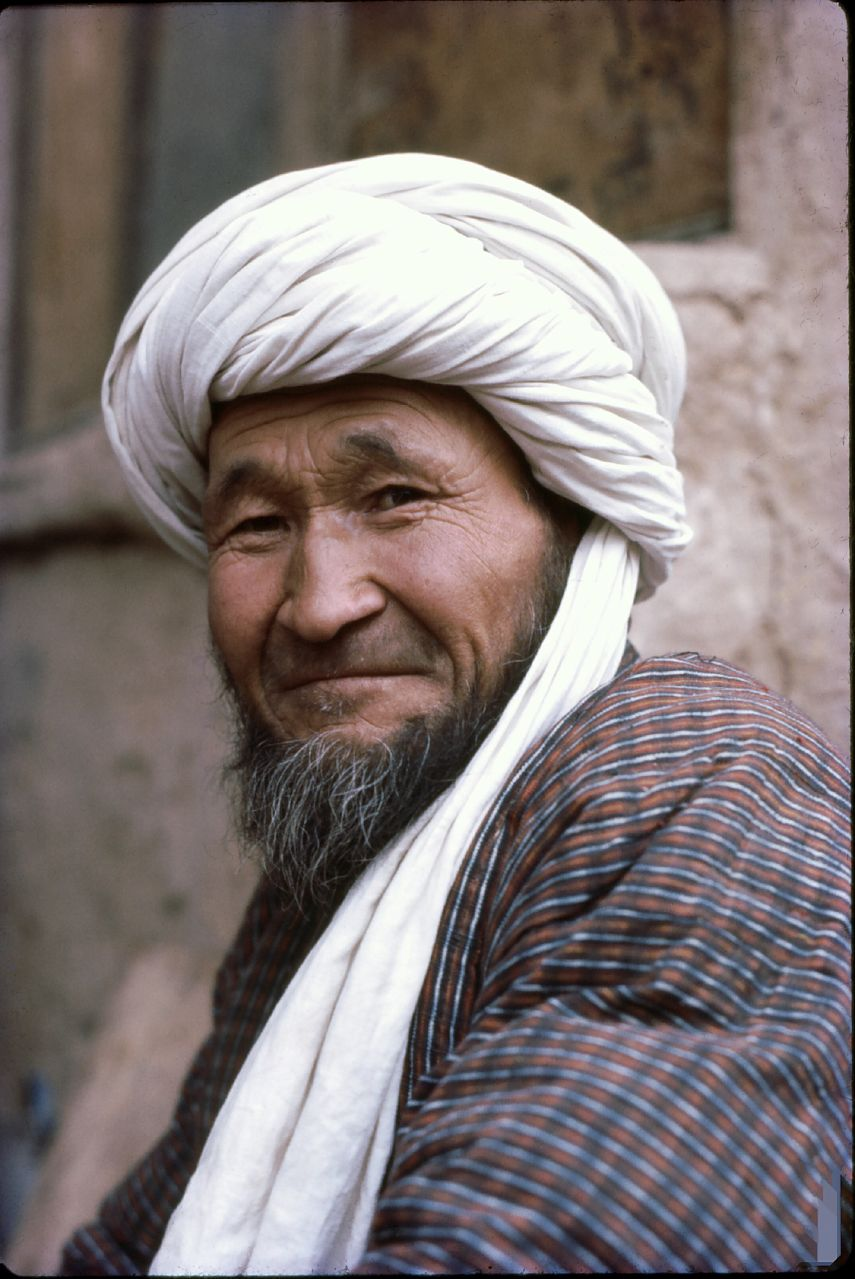
Hazara man wearing Hazara style turban and clothing
