= Afghan clothing =

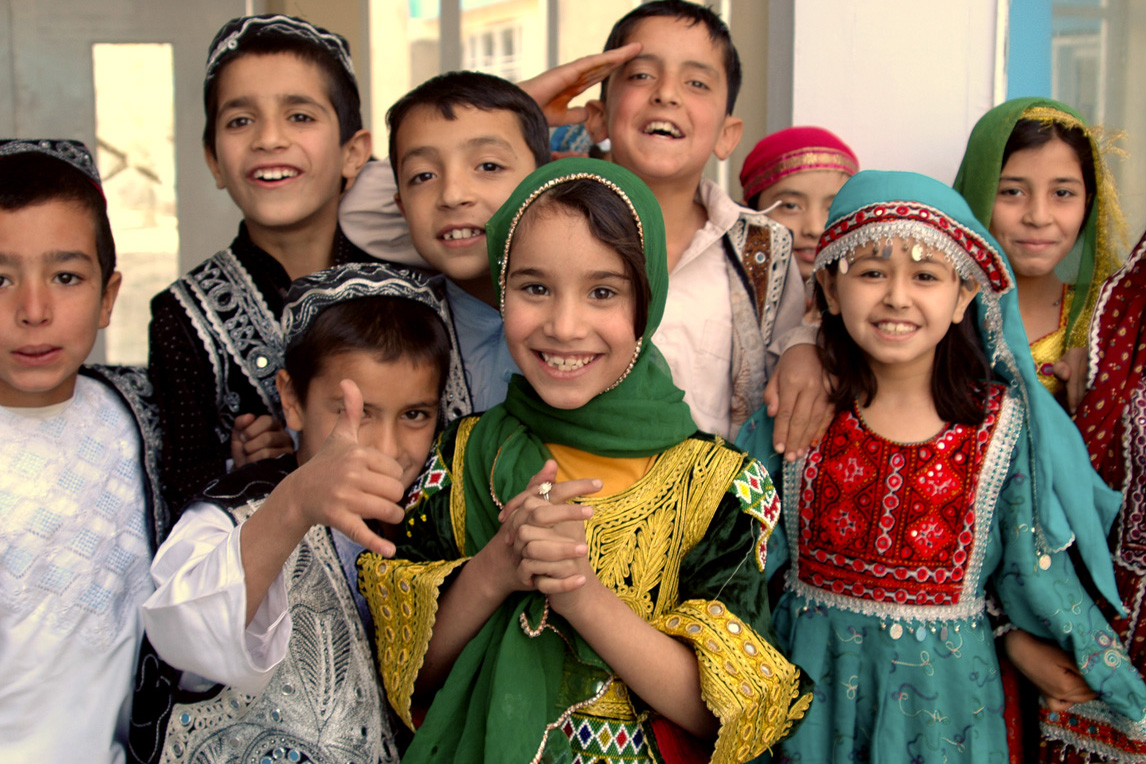
Traditional Afghan attire worn by schoolchildren in Kabul

Clothing in Afghanistan is influenced by the various cultural exchanges in the nation's history, and also may vary by ethnicity. Traditional dresses for both men and women tend to cover the whole body, with trousers gathered at the waist, a loose shirt or dress, and some form of head covering.

== Men's clothing ==
The Perahan Tunban is the standard traditional outfit for men, consisting of a tunic shirt, pants, and optional head covering. It originates from the ancient nomadic eastern Iranians, ancestors to both Tajiks and Pashtuns, and remains traditional among people in Afghanistan. Some of the more famous varieties are the Kandahari Doozi and Herati Doozi styles. Turbans (lungis) are worn all over the country, but the fabric, color, and style vary from region by region. For example, an Uzbek hat from the north of the country is distinct from a Pashtun hat worn in the south.

From a young age, boys often wear colorful caps with shiny "chips" of mirrors sewn into them.

The karakul hat is made of sheep fur and is of typical Central Asian style. Normally worn by the more stylish or educated, these hats come in conservative colors. The chapan, made of striped silk, provides warmth in the winter. Chapans gained international recognition in the 2000s because Afghan president Hamid Karzai always wore a green one.

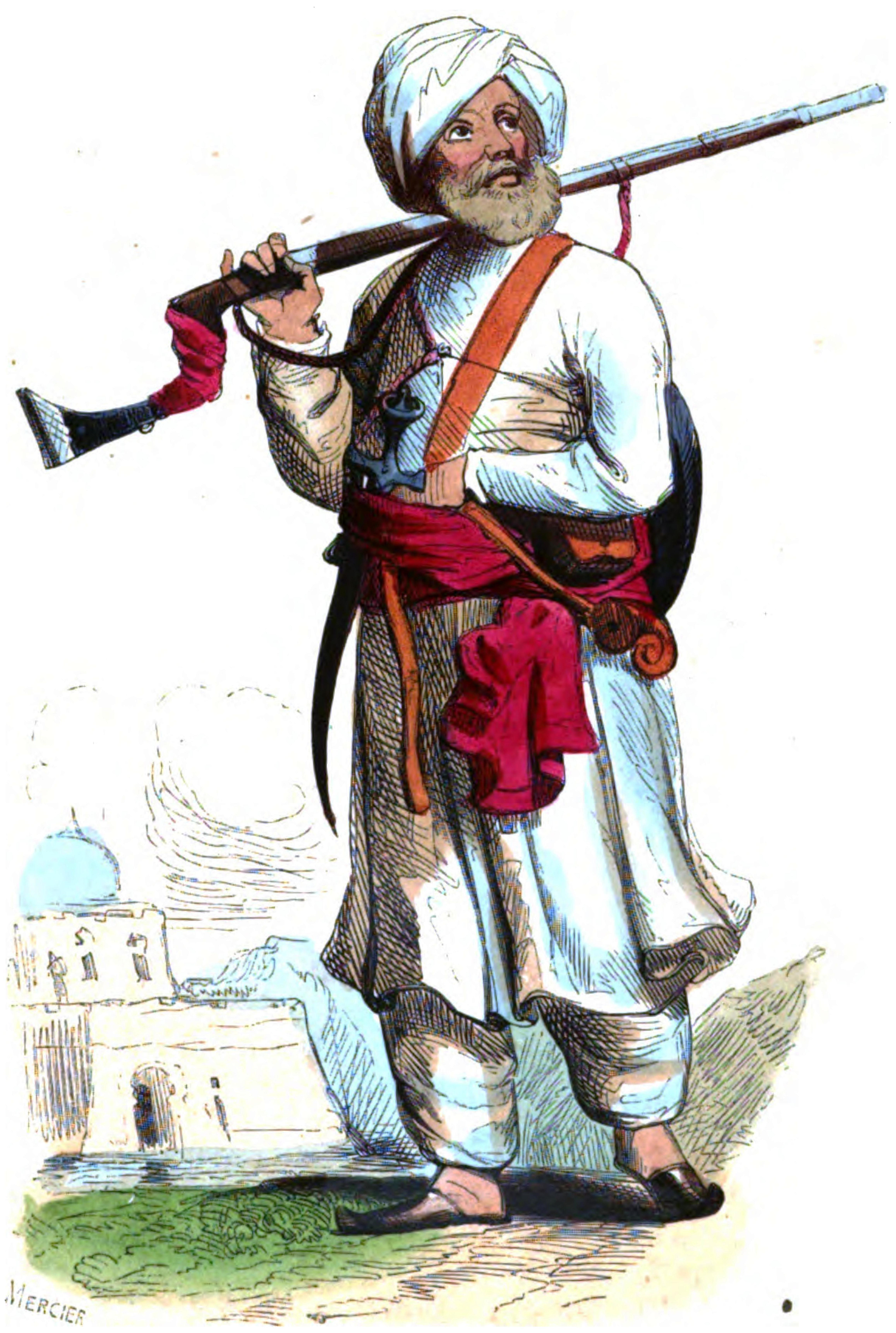
An Afghan soldier wearing perahan tunban, c. 1843

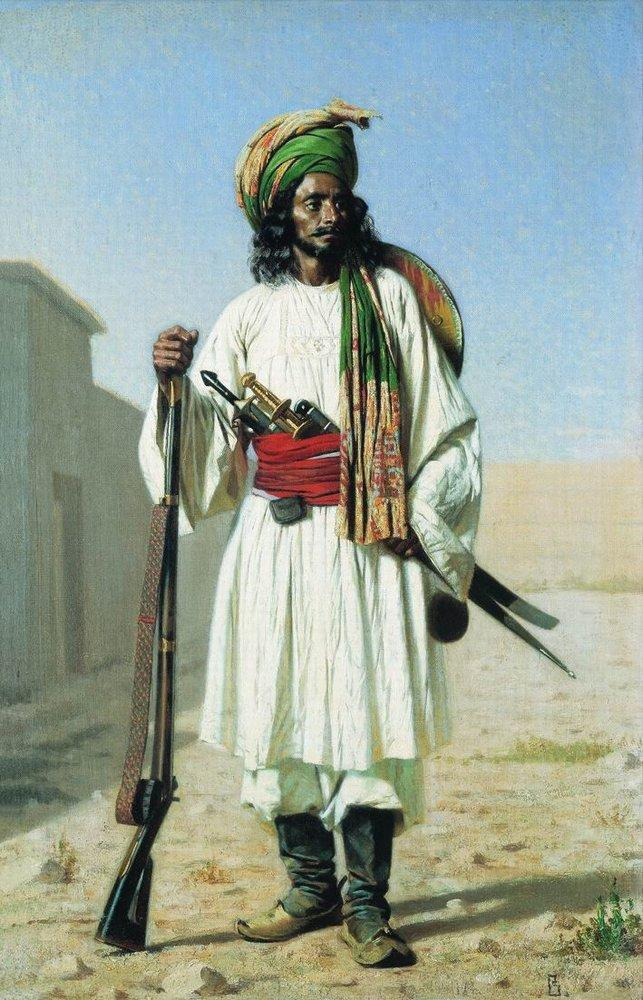
Afghan security personnel in folk costume, c. 1867

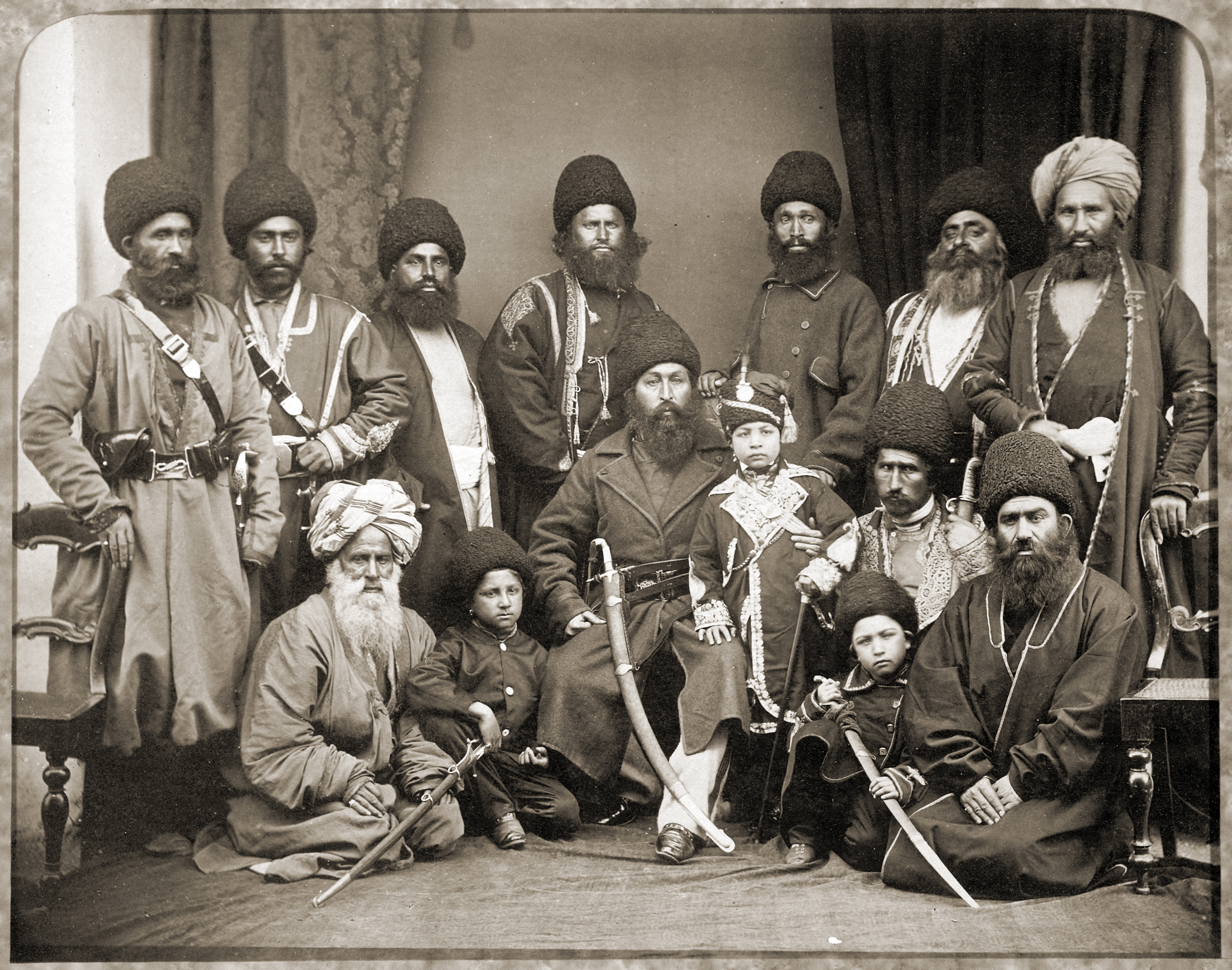
Sher Ali Khan and his company in 1869, all wearing Afghan attire

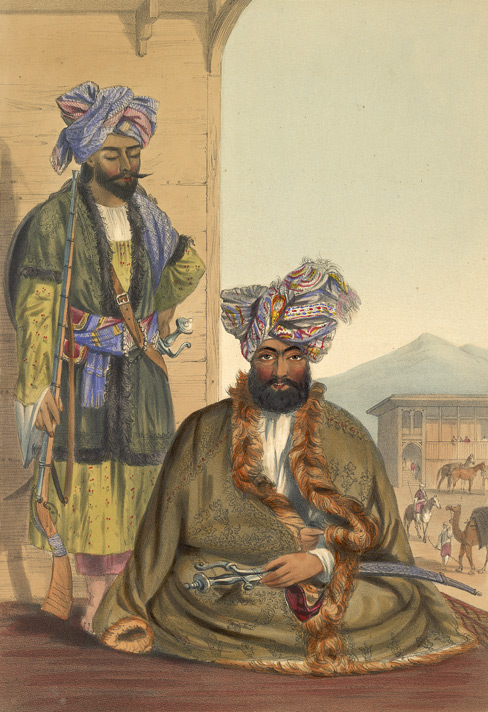
Leader of the Ghilzais, 1848

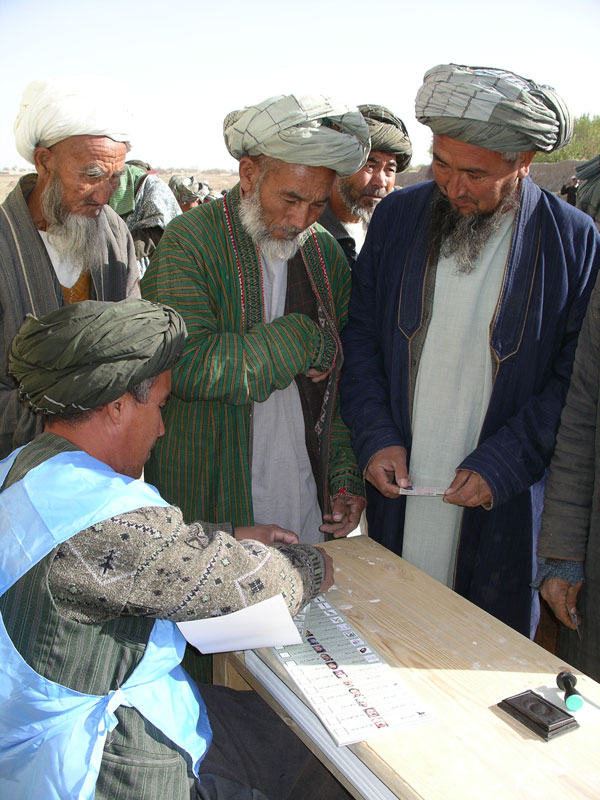
Men wearing Uzbek chapan and turban, 2004

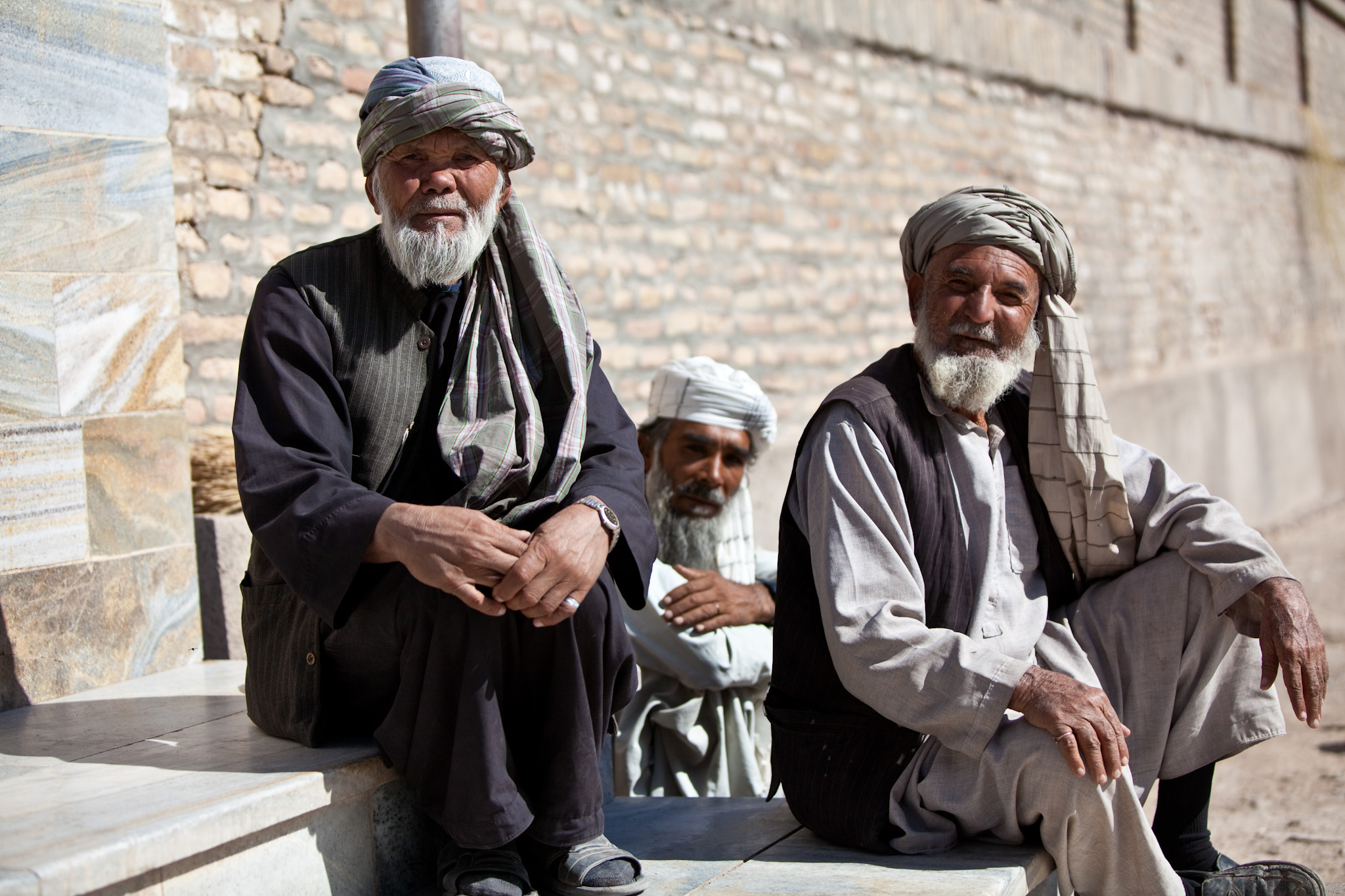
Old men in Herat wearing perahan tunban, 2009

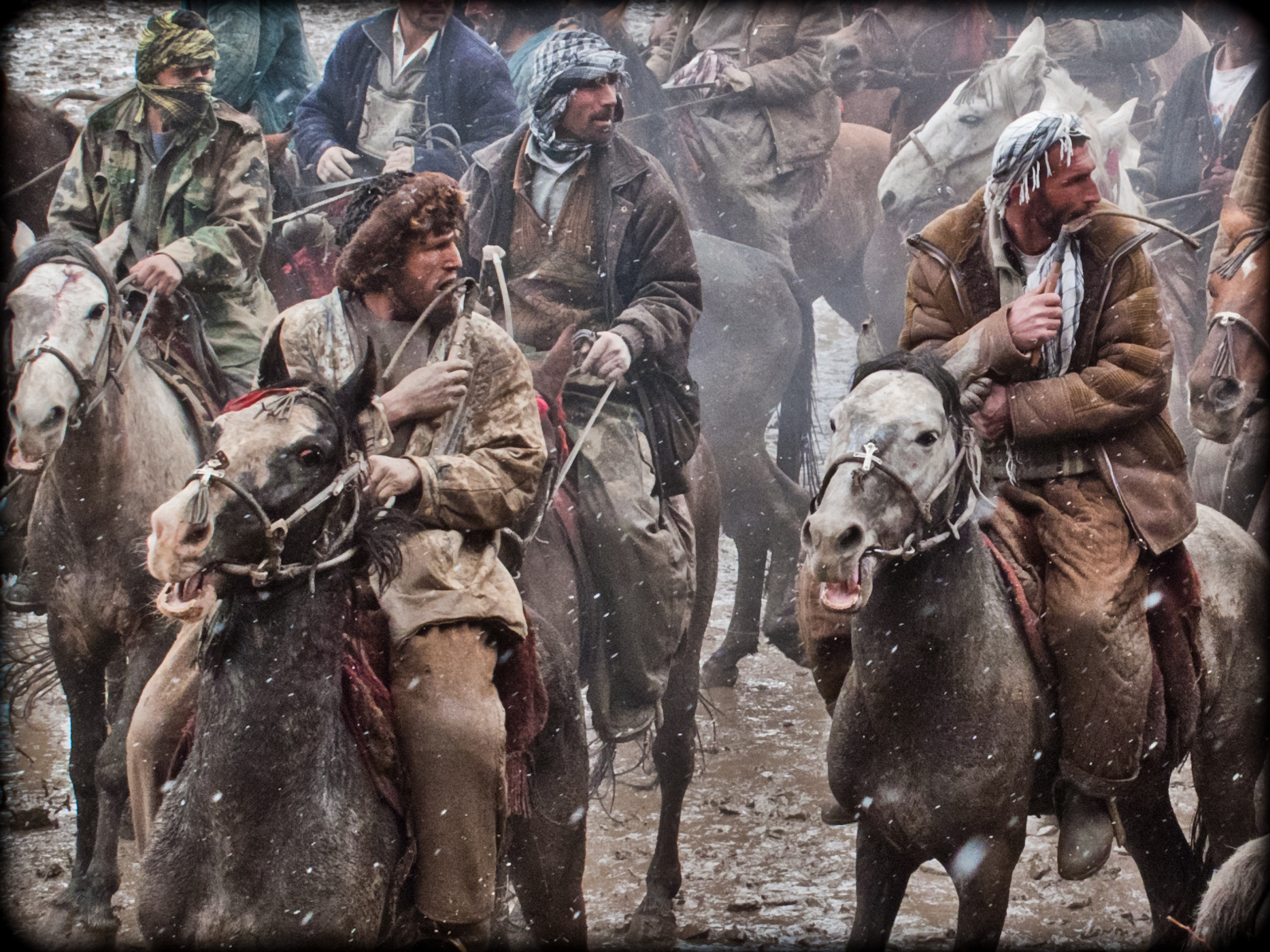
Fur clothing by men during a game of buzkashi

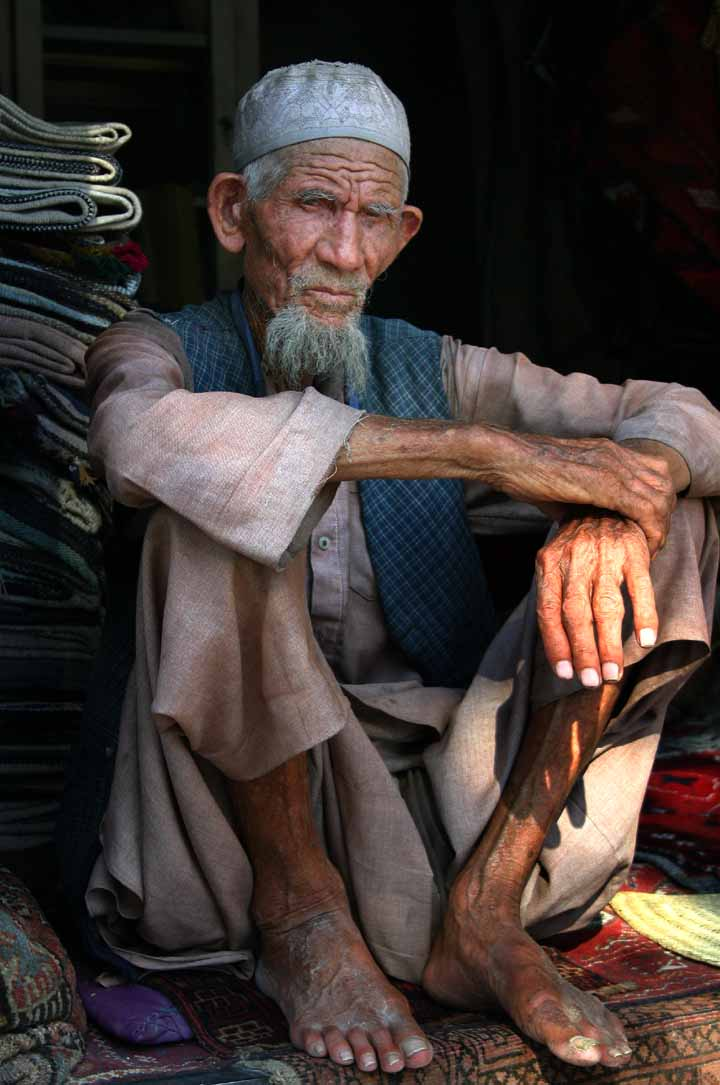
Man in perahan tunban and a taqiyah (Islamic) cap

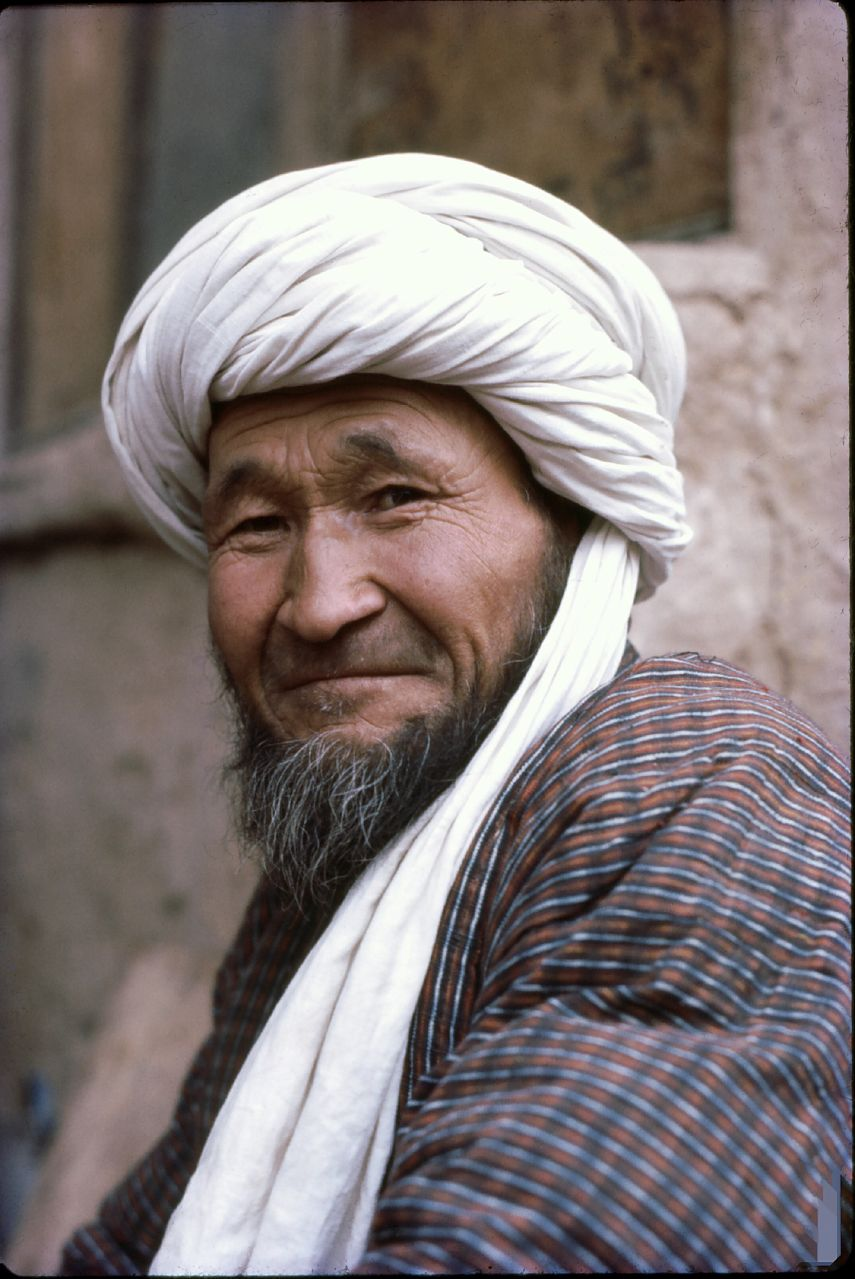
A man wearing Hazara style turban

== Women's clothing ==
Traditional women's dresses are always long and are made from light linens and are loose fitting for ease of movement. They come in many colors and have stitching for details. Most traditional clothing are colorful, except for the Nuristan dress. More elaborate and fancier dresses are detailed with gold threading (Zardozi), gold beads, and come in many different colors on silk fabrics. These dresses are usually worn to special occasions and weddings.

They are usually of heavy design and filled with small mirrors around the chest area, along with long and pleated skirts.

Most Afghans are Muslim and virtually all Afghan women wear a head covering based on the local interpretation of religious laws. Most women wear a hijab or chador as a covering. Some wear a chadari, better known in the West as burqa.

In a few places like Kabul, Western dresses like jeans are often worn. From the 1960s to 1990s, more liberal forms of female dress like miniskirts were popular among some communities in Kabul.

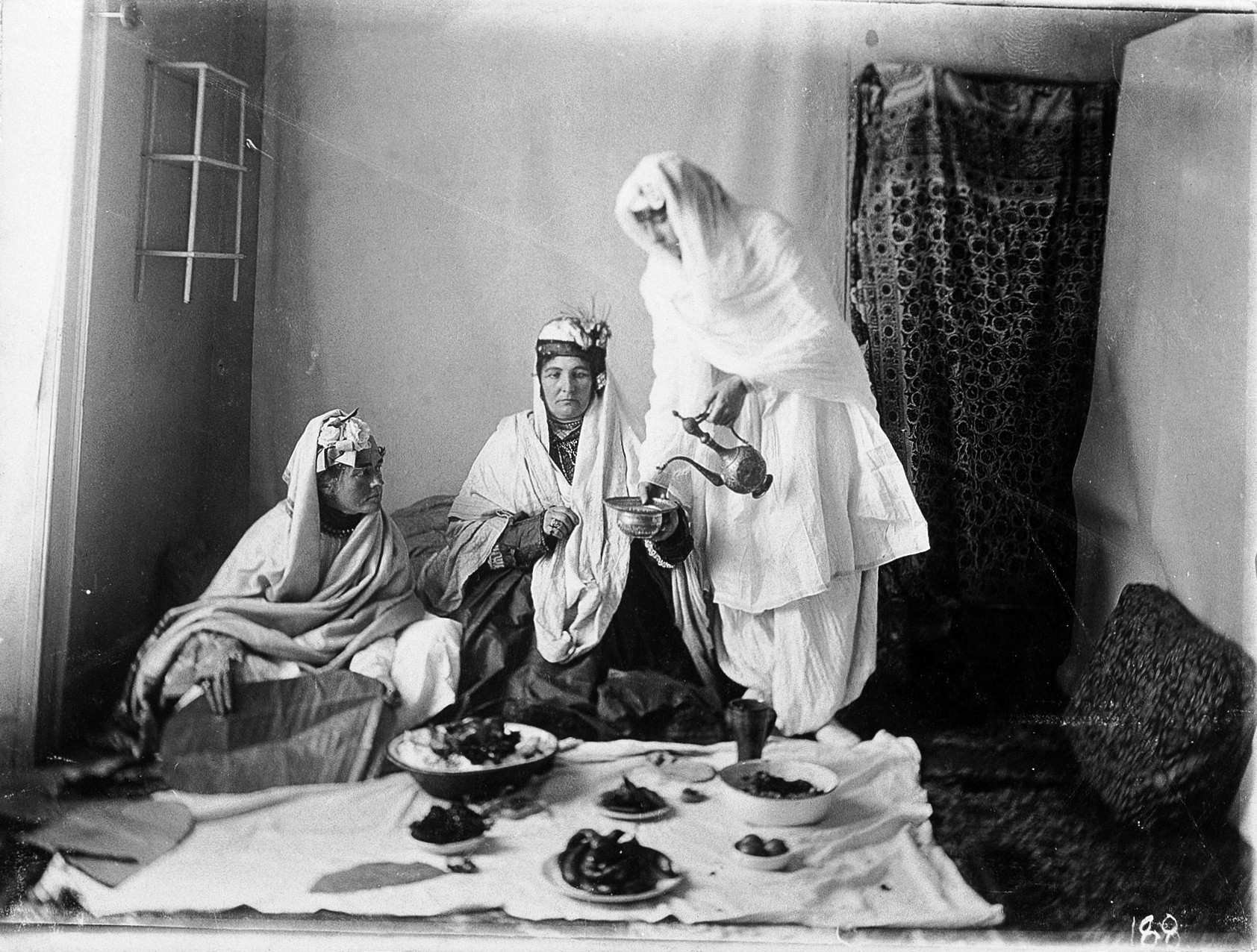
Ladies of the royal harem, 19th century

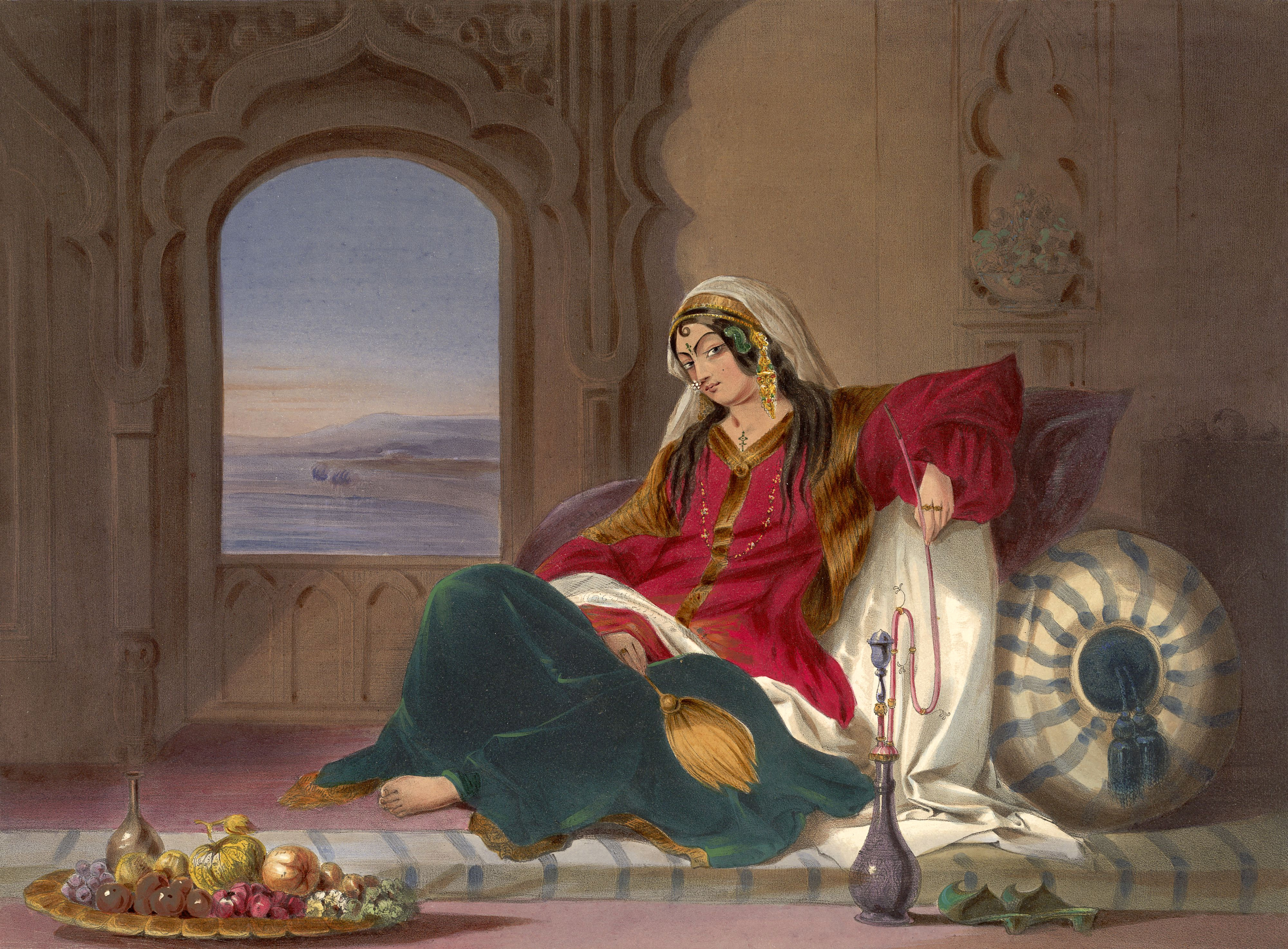
Woman of Kandahar wearing khet partug, 1841

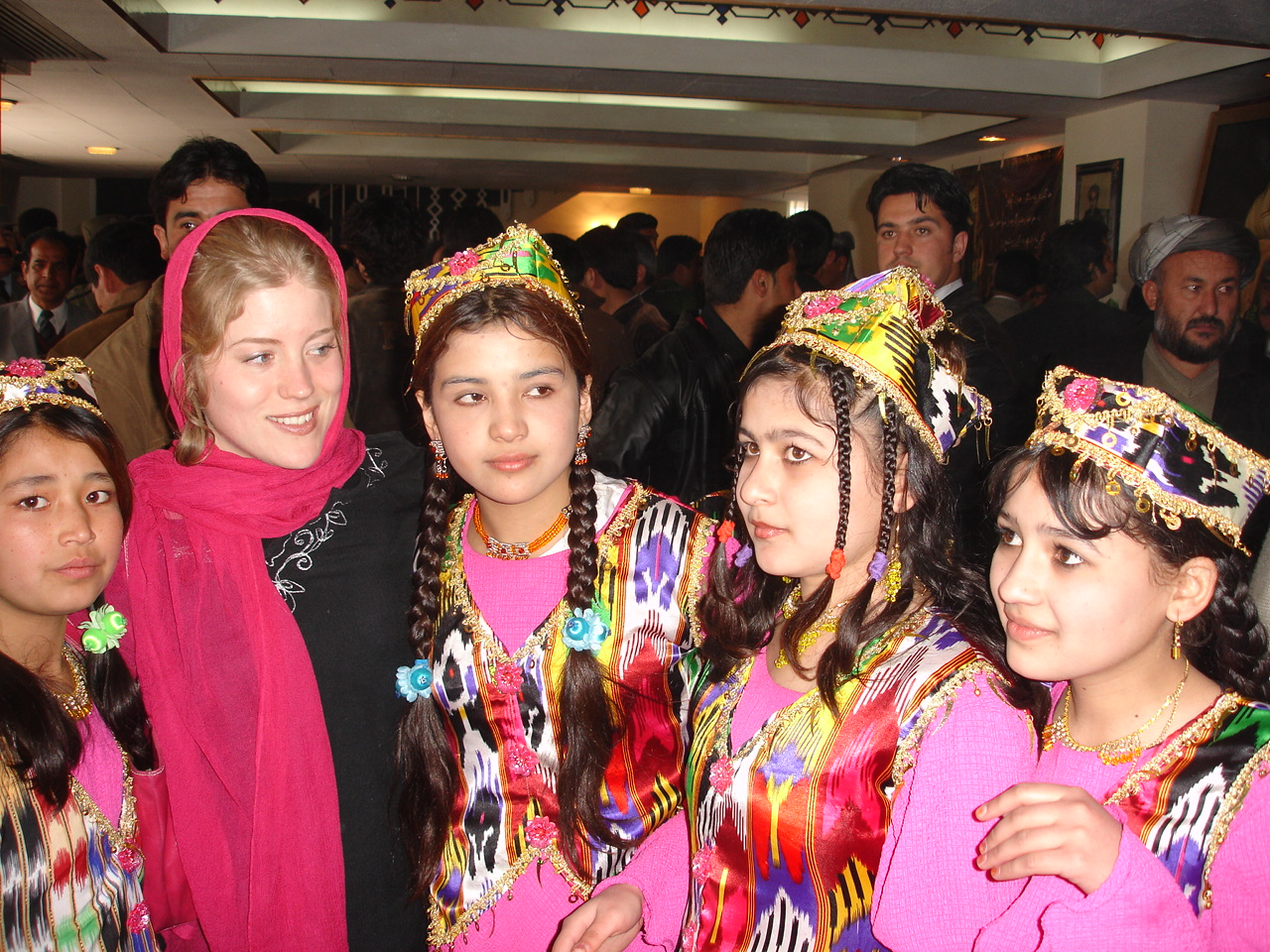
Uzbek girls in Kabul

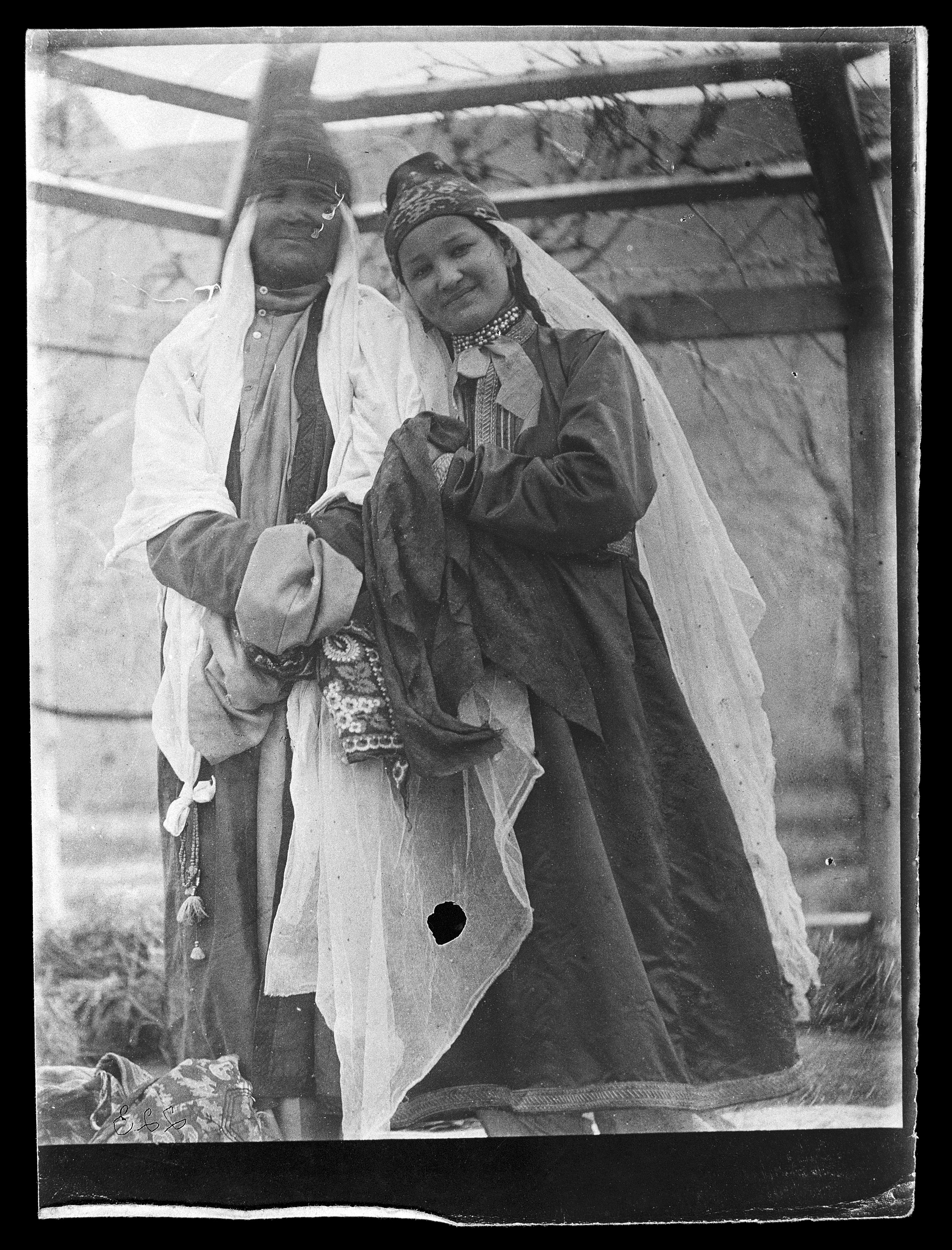
Two women in Turkmen dress

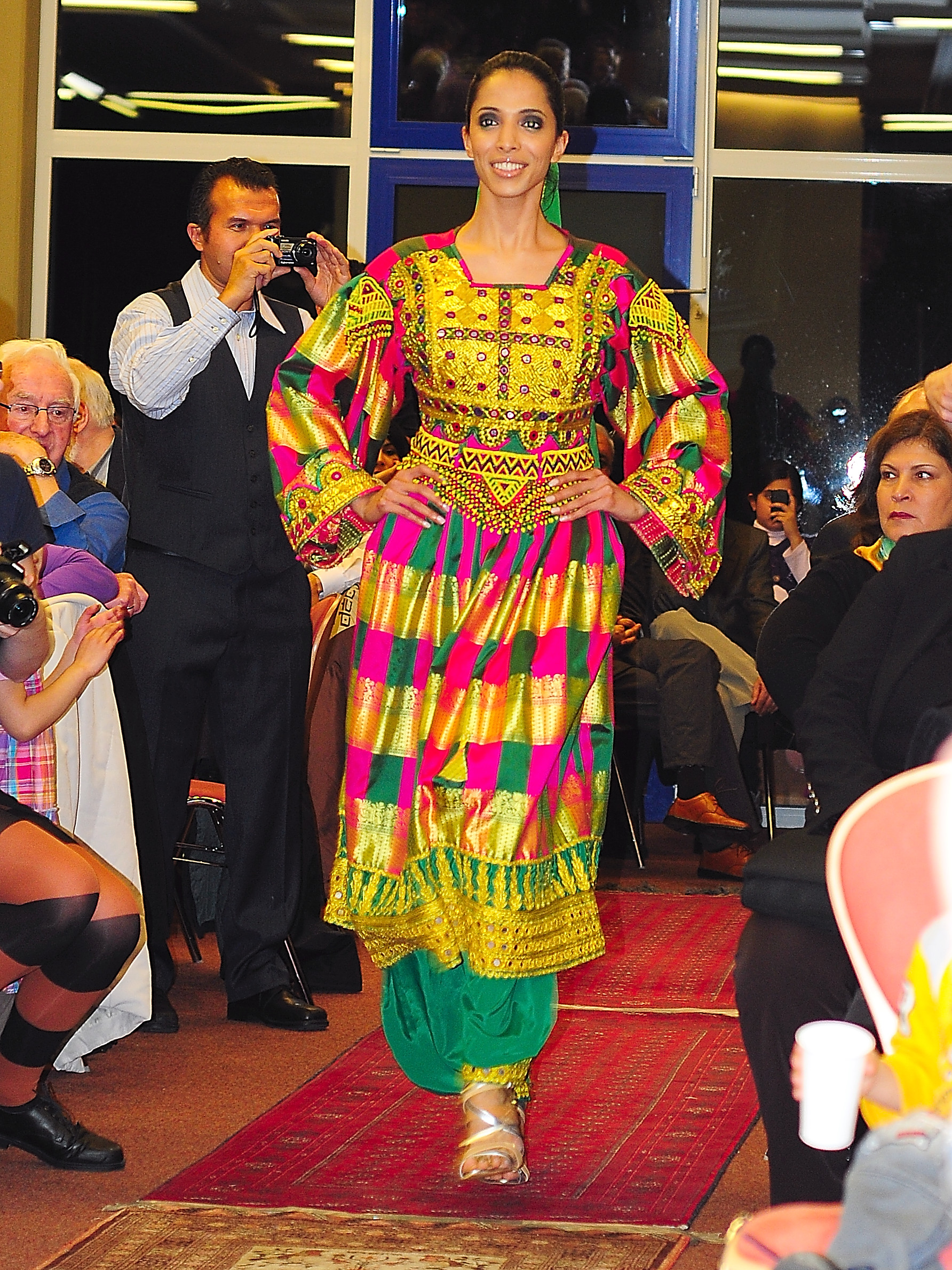
Afghan-German model Zohre Esmaeli in traditional Afghan dress

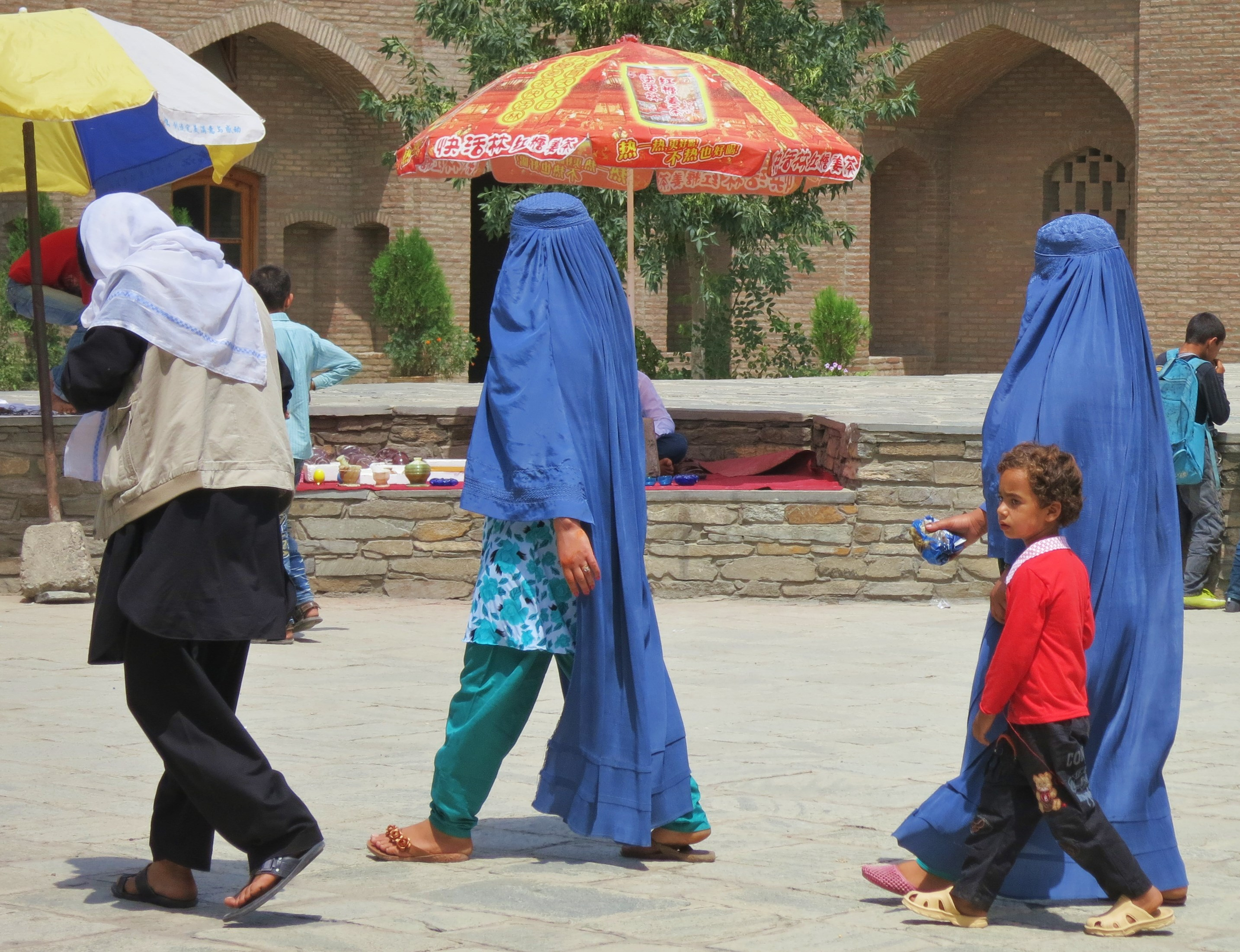
Burqa-clad women

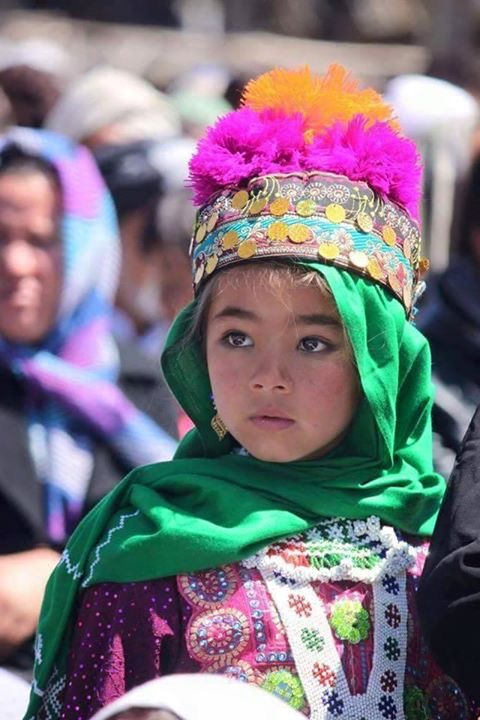
A girl in Hazara dress

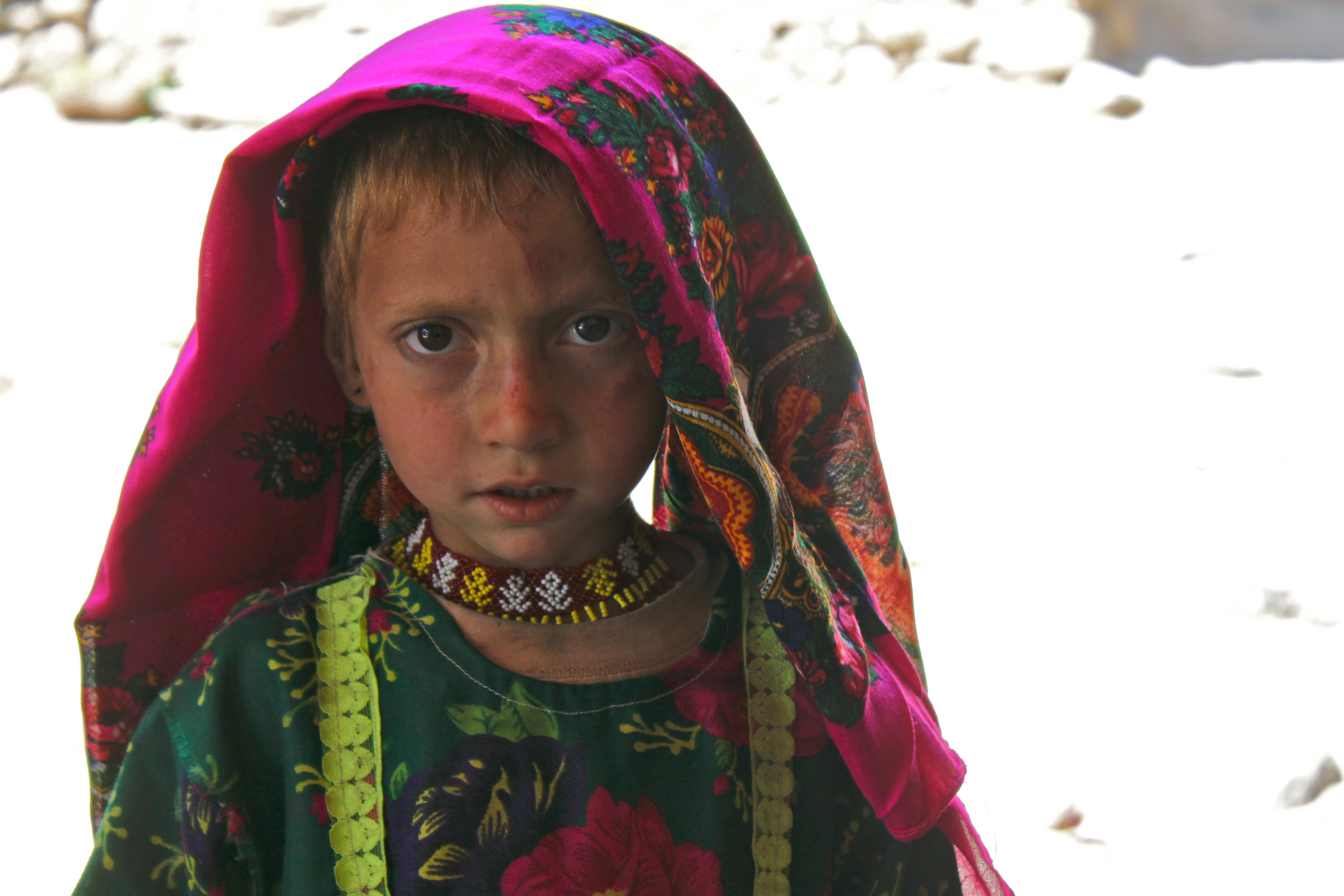
A girl in Pashayi dress

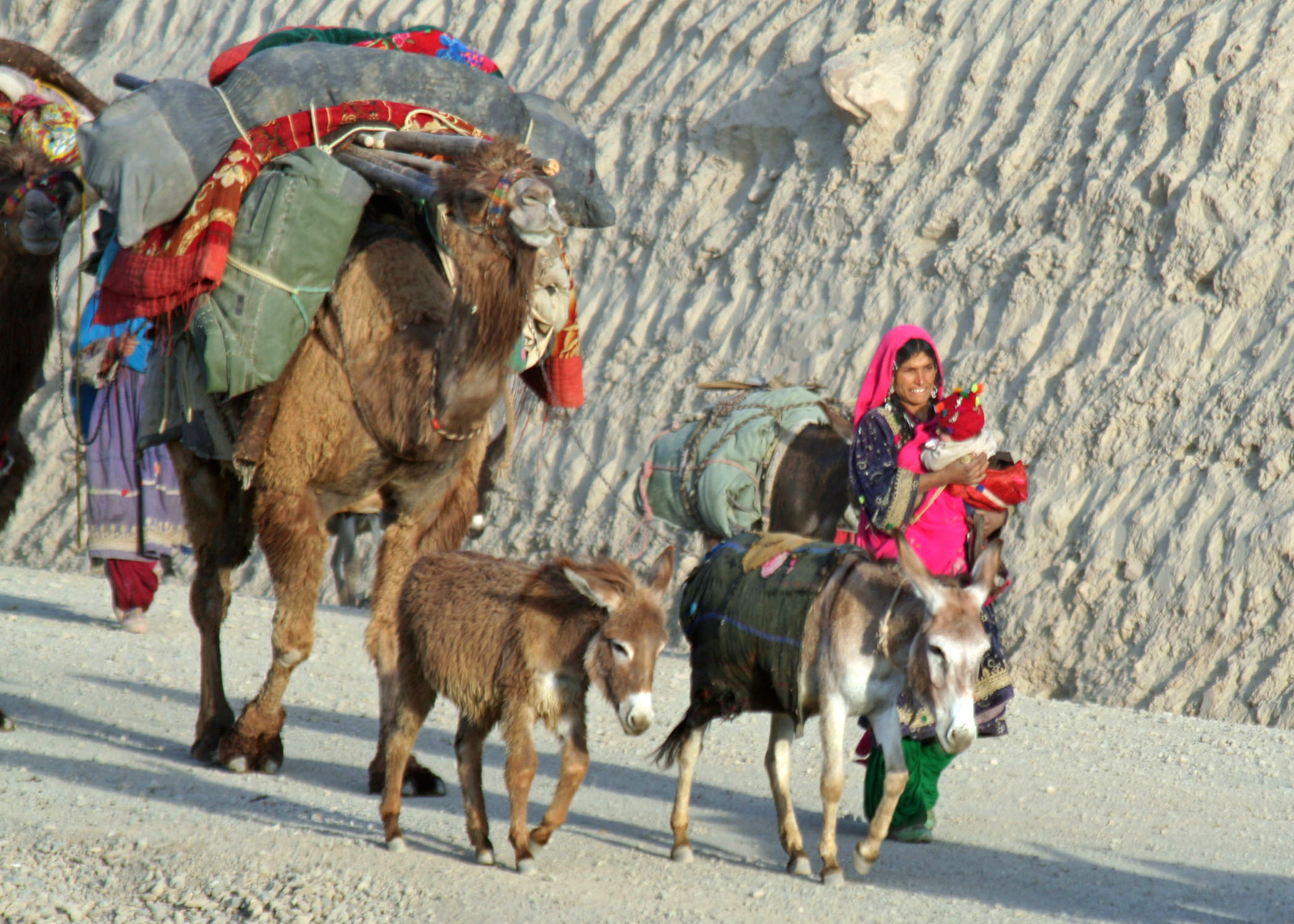
Nomadic kuchi woman

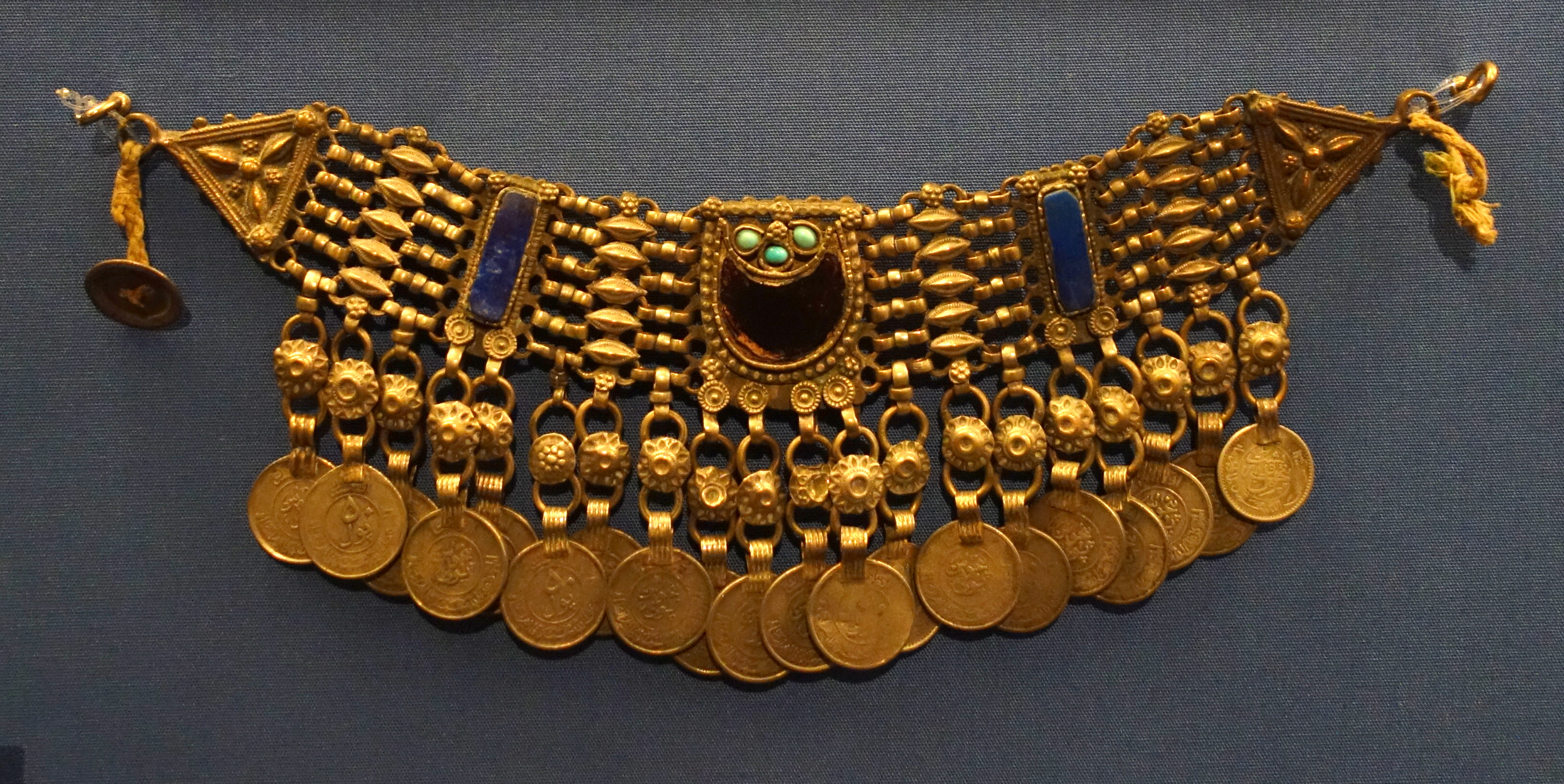
A choker necklace from Afghanistan made from silver and lapis lazuli

== Culture and society ==
Clothes are usually stitched by hand. Girls start learning embroidery from an early age and skills are normally passed down from mothers to daughters. Each dress created by a woman can be seen as a unique piece of art.

Certain attire has special significance. In some Pashtun and Baloch cultures in southern Afghanistan, a boy becomes a man when he is allowed to wear a turban.

=== Politics ===
The clothing of Afghanistan gained wide attention in the Western world following the U.S. invasion and fall of the Taliban regime, under which ultraconservative dress like the burqa was made compulsory. Especially, Hamid Karzai gained popularity for his creative style blending various attire of Afghanistan. In September 2021, Afghan women launched an online campaign protesting against the Taliban's strict dress code after the militants took power.

Also notably, a photo taken in Kabul in 1972 showing local women in miniskirts was reportedly shown to then-President Donald Trump of the United States by H. R. McMaster, which persuaded Trump to keep American troops in Afghanistan.

=== Western and hippie appeal ===
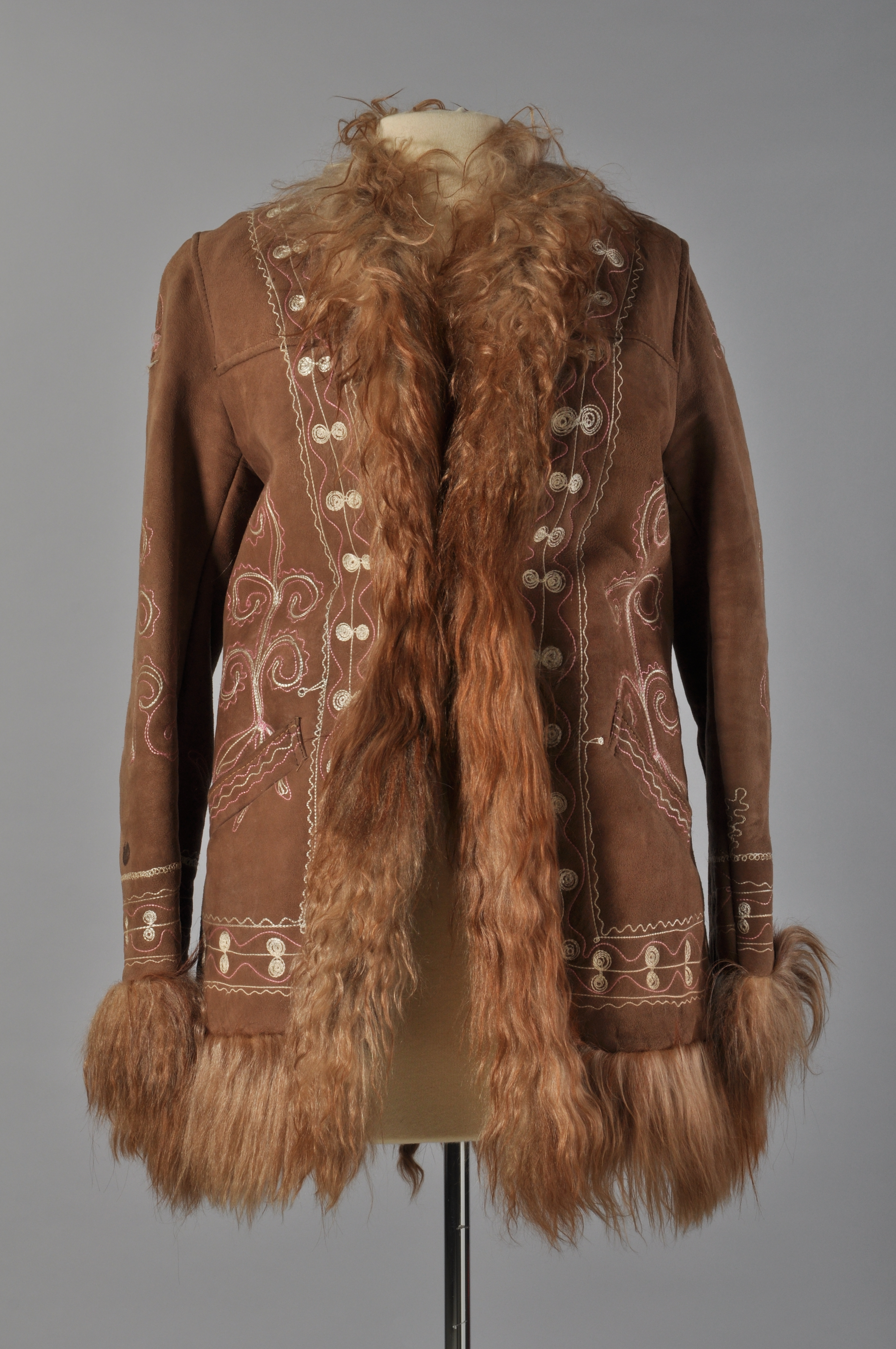
Afghan suede coat

Sheepskin Afghan coats became popular in the Western world during the late 1960s; John Lennon famously wore one during the launch of his band's Sgt. Pepper's Lonely Hearts Club Band album in London. The Afghan coat became a popular dress in the hippie subculture. Afghanistan itself was on the hippie trail and such coats were often bought by foreigners in Kabul's Chicken Street.

== See also ==
- Pashtun clothing
- Punjabi clothing
- Hazara clothing
