= Barak (cloth) =

Type of fabric

Barak (Persian: بَرَک) or Barag (برگ), also called barrak or burruk, is a kind of soft, thick and durable fabric that is woven by hand from goat and sheep wool or camel hair in Khorasan. Barak is a soft and strong textile, and is mainly used for sewing men's clothes. The warmth of the very thick and soft fabric is reputed to reduce muscle and joint pains. In the past, most of the dervishes made clothes and hats from barak, and later, with the improvement of its quality, kings and rulers also wore barak clothes.
