= Perahan o tunban =

Traditional Afghan clothing worn by men in Afghanistan and Pakistan

Perahan o tunban (Note: Pashto: پیراهن او تنبان, romanized: perāhan aw tunbān, pronounced [perɑˈhan ɐʊ tʊnˈbɑn]; Dari: پیراهن و تنبان, romanized: perāhan u tunbān, cyrillized: пероҳану тунбон, pronounced [pʰeːɾɑːˈhan‿ʊ tʰʊnˈbɑːn]) (Note: lit. 'gown and breech; shirt and pants') is a garment worn by men in Afghanistan and in some parts of Pakistan.

== Design ==
=== Traditional ===
==== Perahan and tunban ====
The perahan (پیراهن)—the upper garment—is wide and loose with the sleeves also worn loose and pendent from the arms. The traditional perahan varies according to the region of Afghanistan with some ending at the knees and others midway between the calf and the feet (in which case small slits are created). The traditional perahan also buttons on either shoulder, is collarless and is meant to be loose. Further, the traditional perahan is wide but fits closer to the body down to the waist and then is loose and full down to the knees (thereby flaring out).

The tunban (تنبان)—the lower garment—is worn loose and hanging. Some versions of the tunban have the ample folds gathered into plaits at the lower part of the legs, below the knees to the ankles and the loose part above overhangs in loops. The tunban therefore uses a lot of material so that it gathers around the waist and folds around the legs.

The design of dress in Afghanistan is unique due to some embroidery on the chest or down the collar as well as around the two sides of collar’s buttons which adds a unique look to the dress. The dress is usually of made cotton and polyester, but it can be also made out of woolly fabric for winter. The length of the dress is to the knee and the wearer has the option of choosing the lower part to be in circle or square in design.

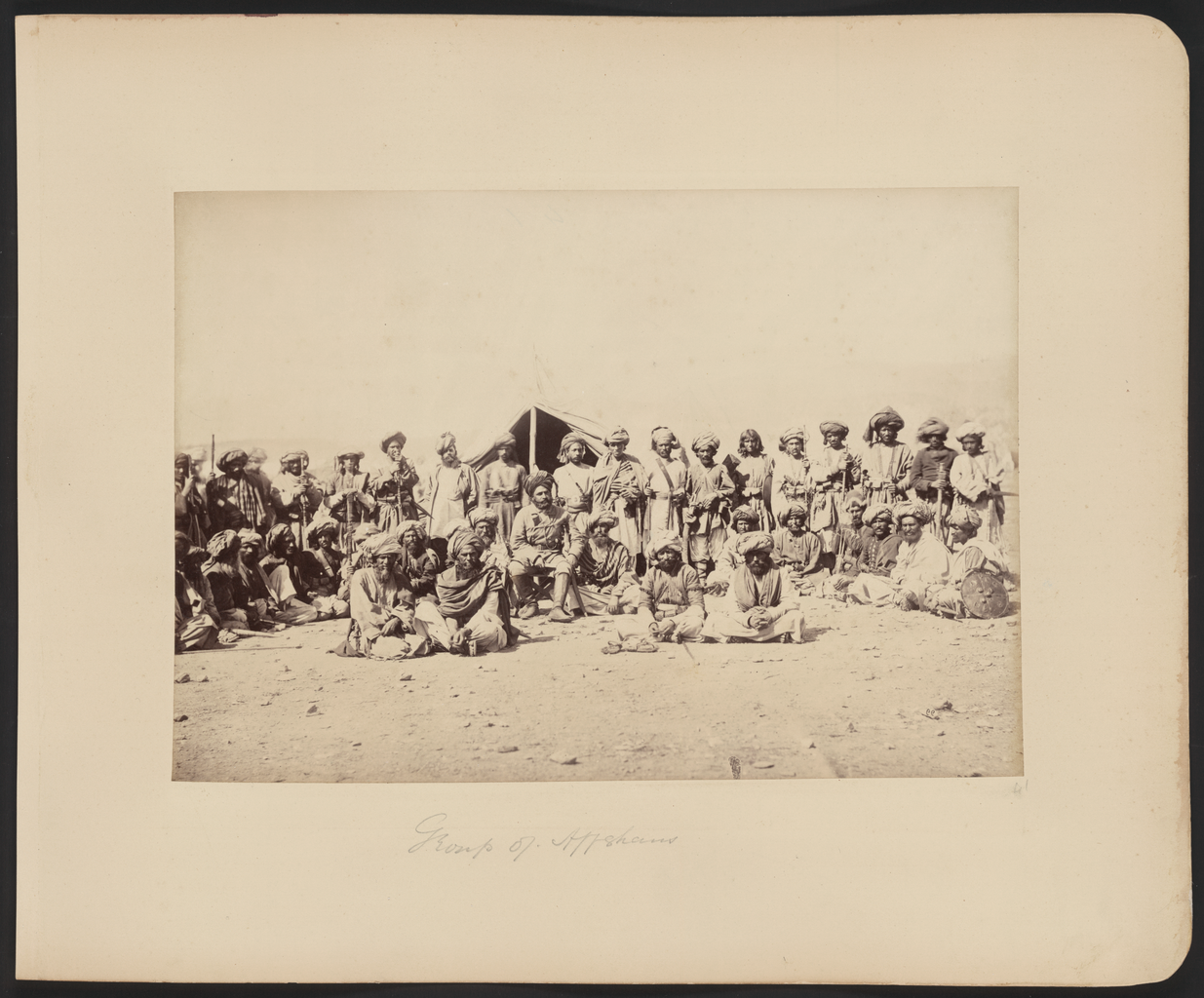
Group of men of Afghanistan in traditional Perahan tunban

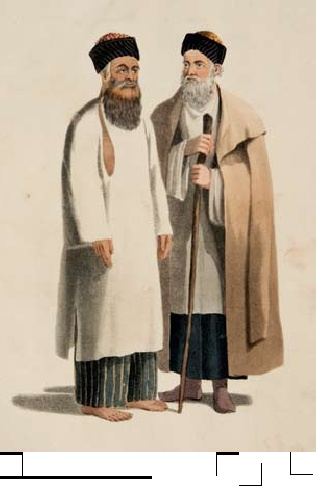
Men wearing traditional Perahan worn in Southern Afghanistan (1842)

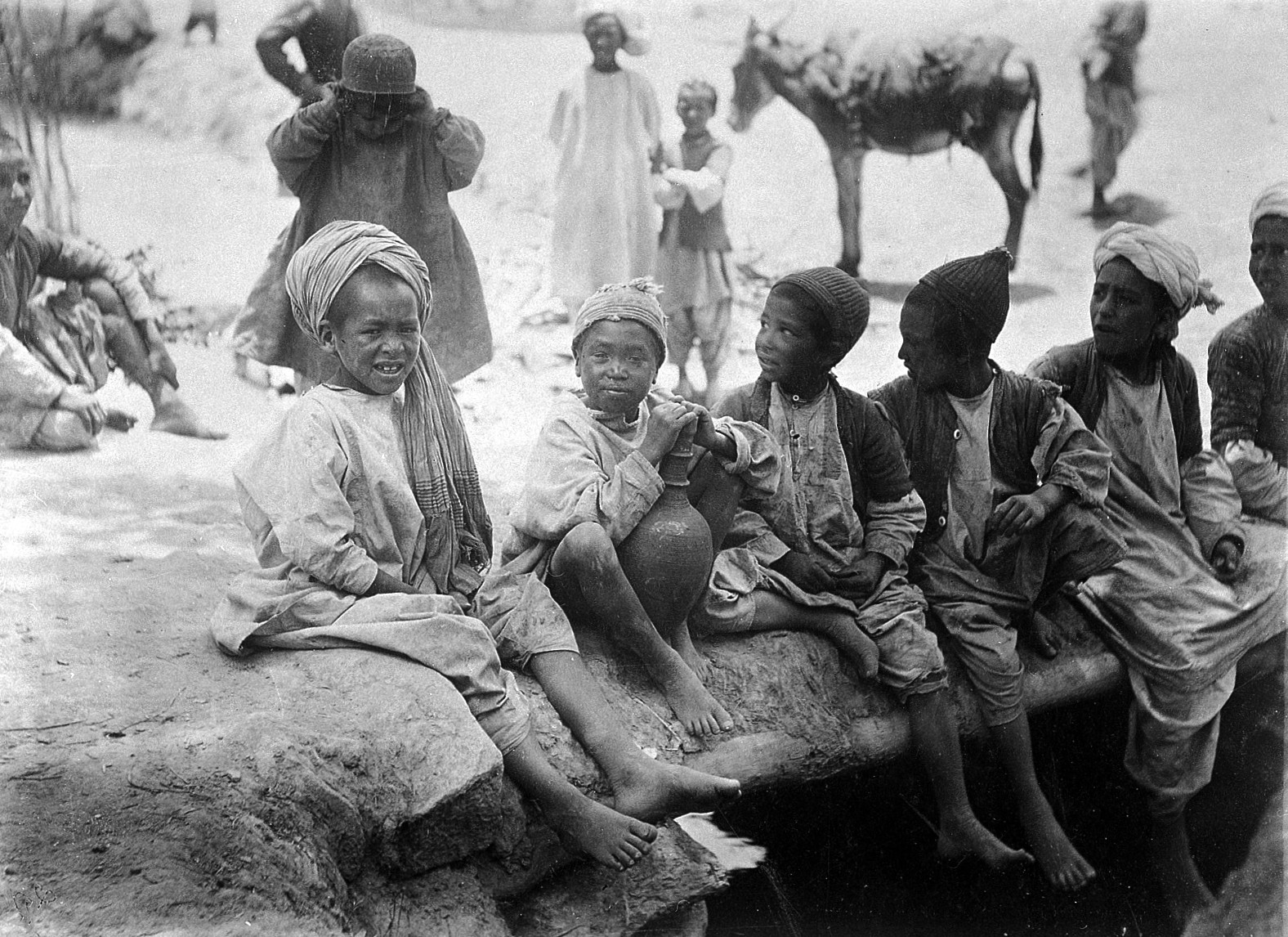
'Group of children sitting in a row'

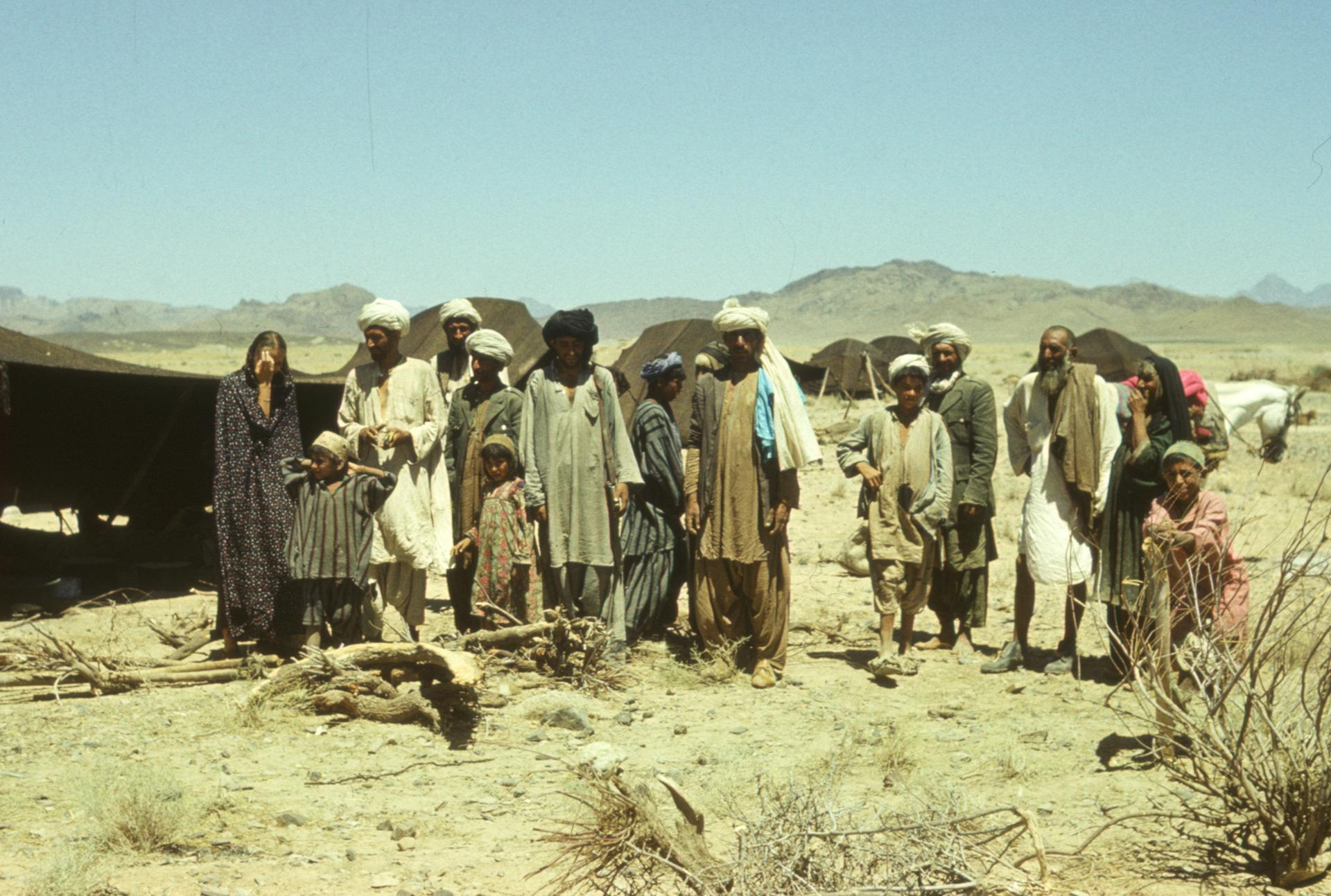
men and boys in perahan tunban

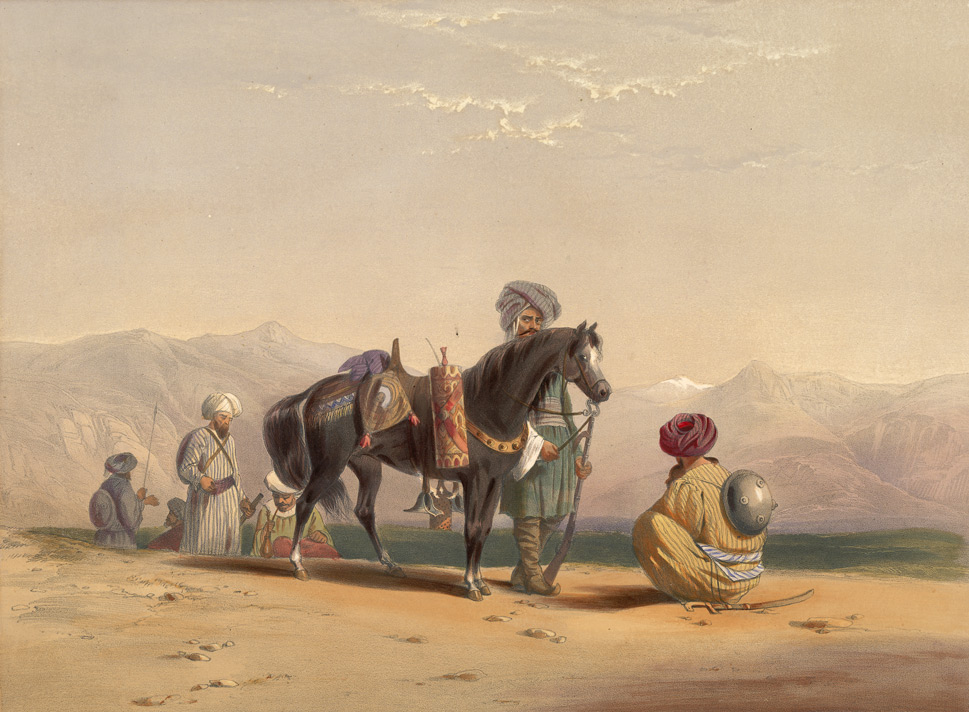
Afghan cavalry during 1839-42

=== Modern version ===
The modern perahan o tunban retains some of the loose features of the traditional perahan o tunban but is similar to the straight cut shalwar kameez. Some styles also have the buttons open at the front.

The modern perahan uses side slits. However, unlike the straight cut kameez, the sides of the perahan are cut like an arch. The tunban can be a yard wide.

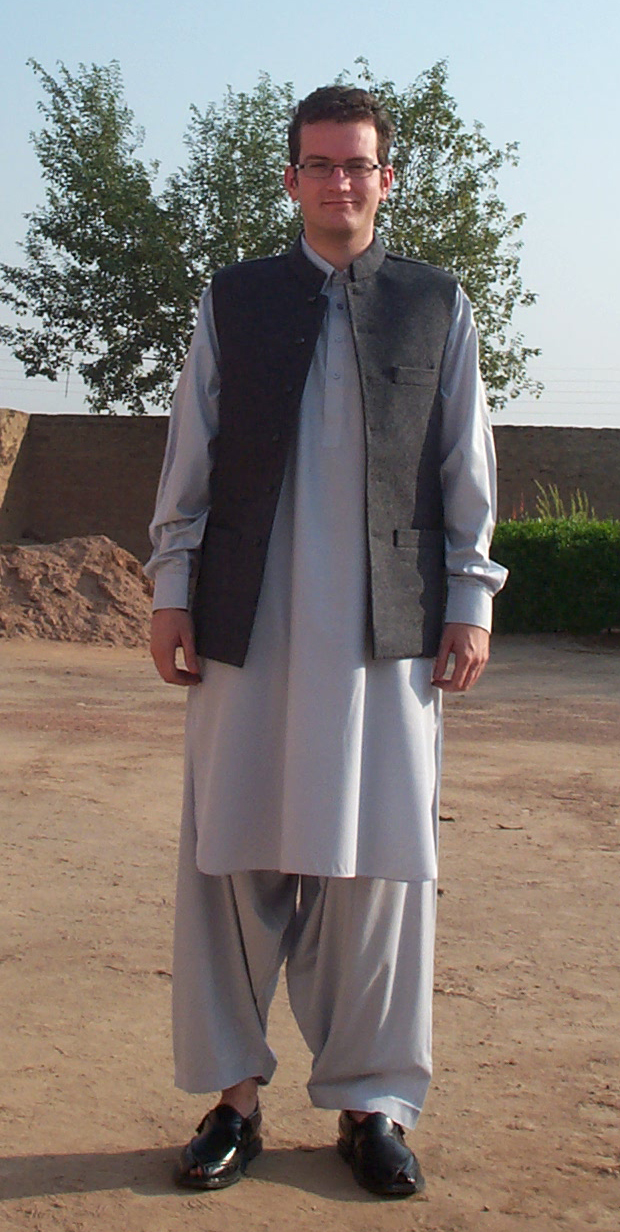
Clothing worn by most Pashtun males in Afghanistan and most males in Pakistan

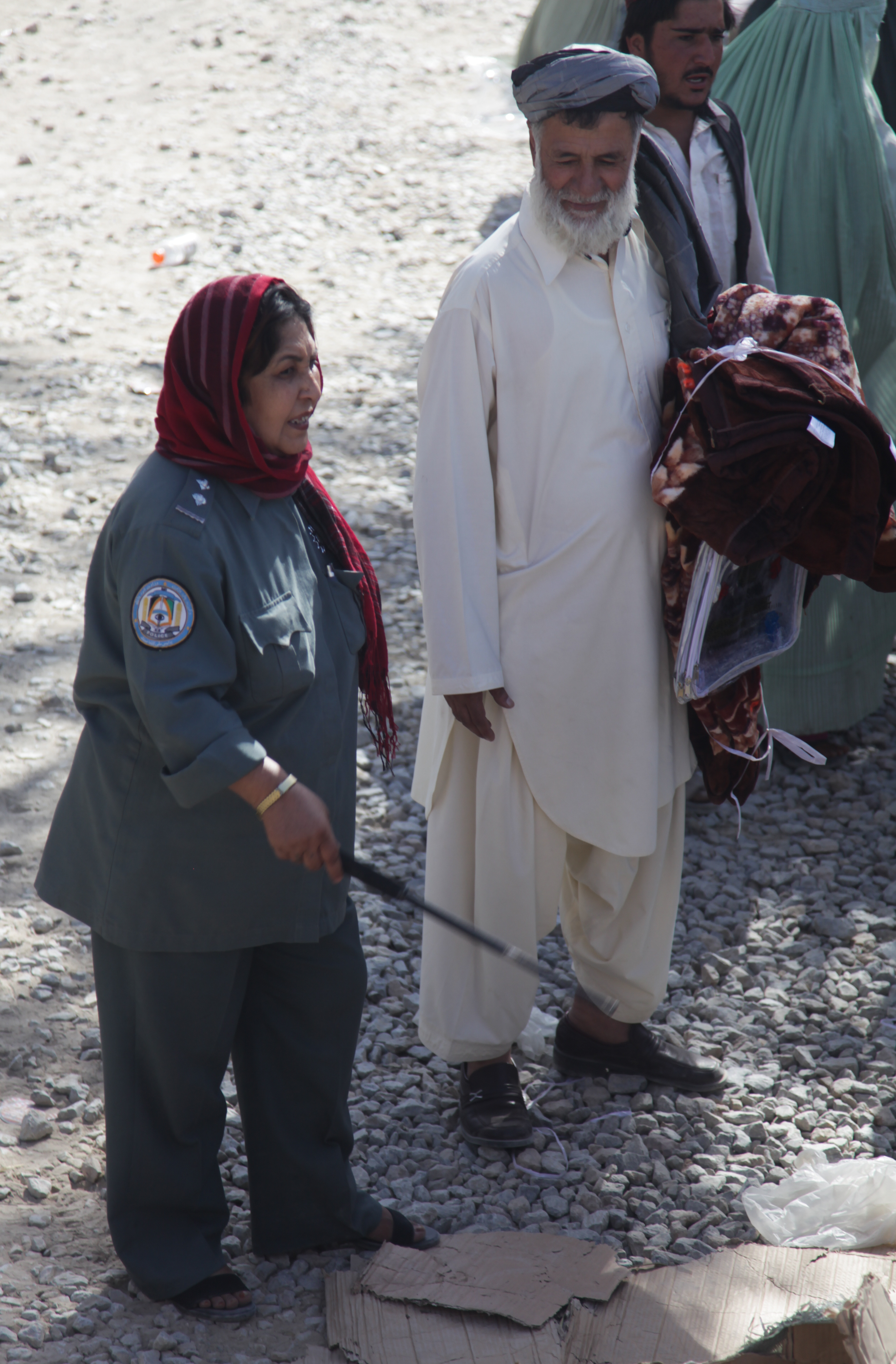
Man in Afghan clothing: Perahan tunban

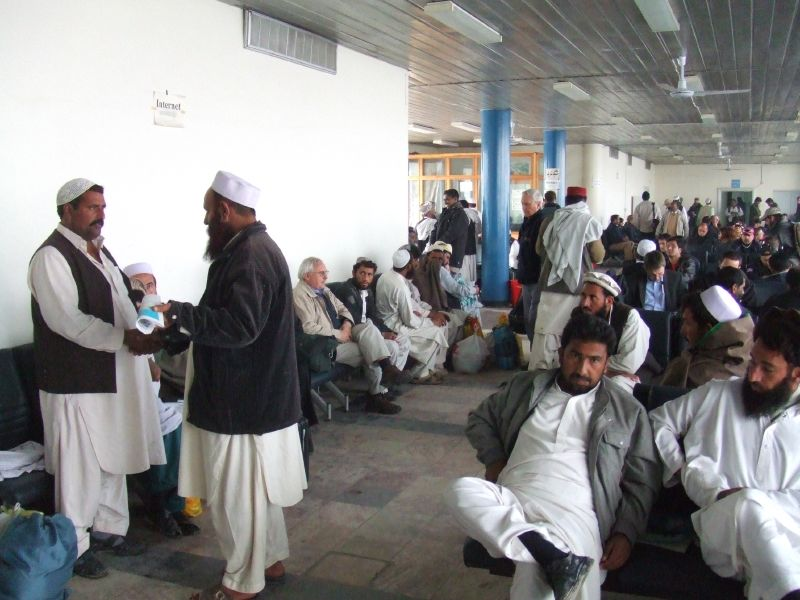
Men wearing Perahan tunban, form of shalwar kameez at Kabul Airport in Afghanistan

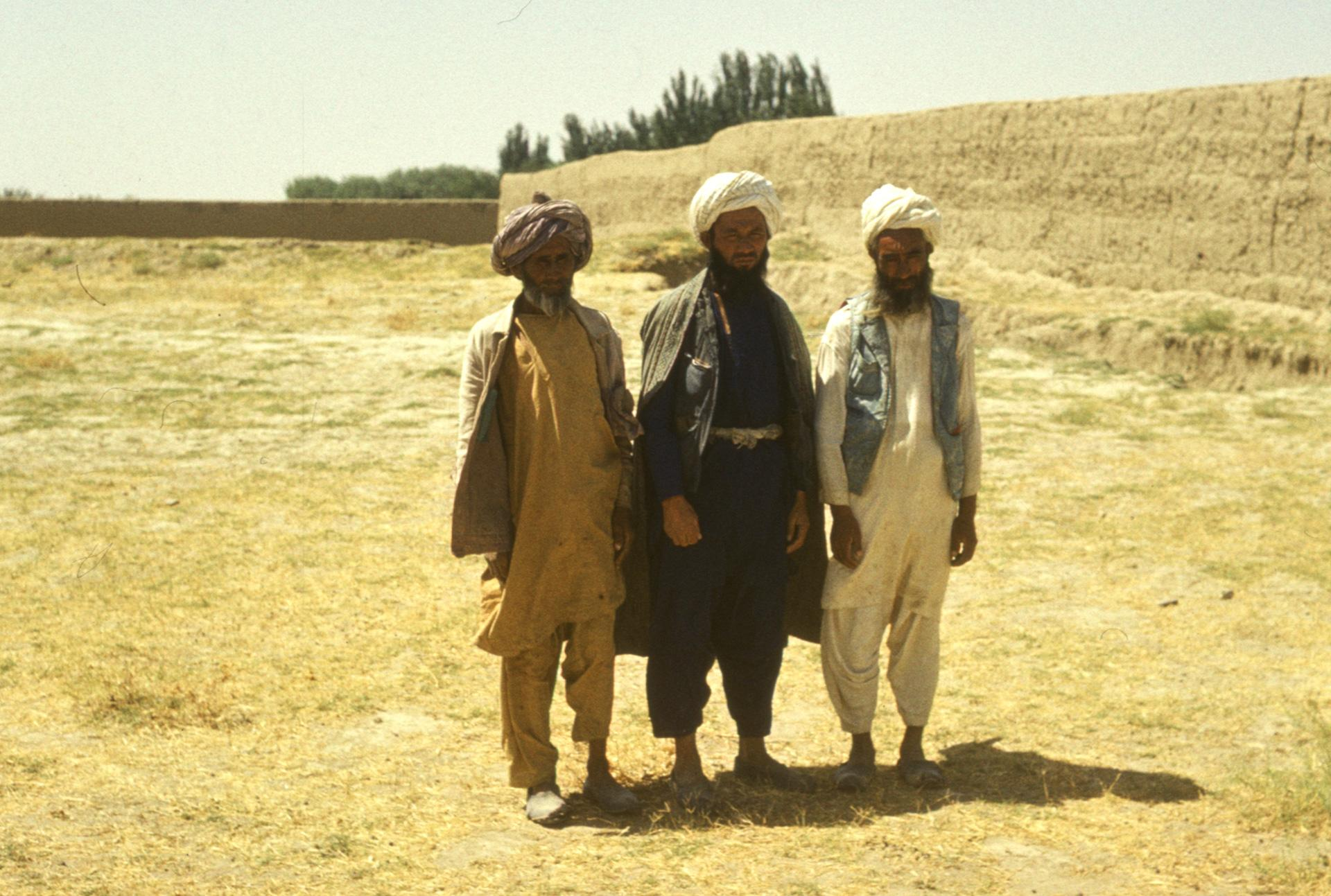

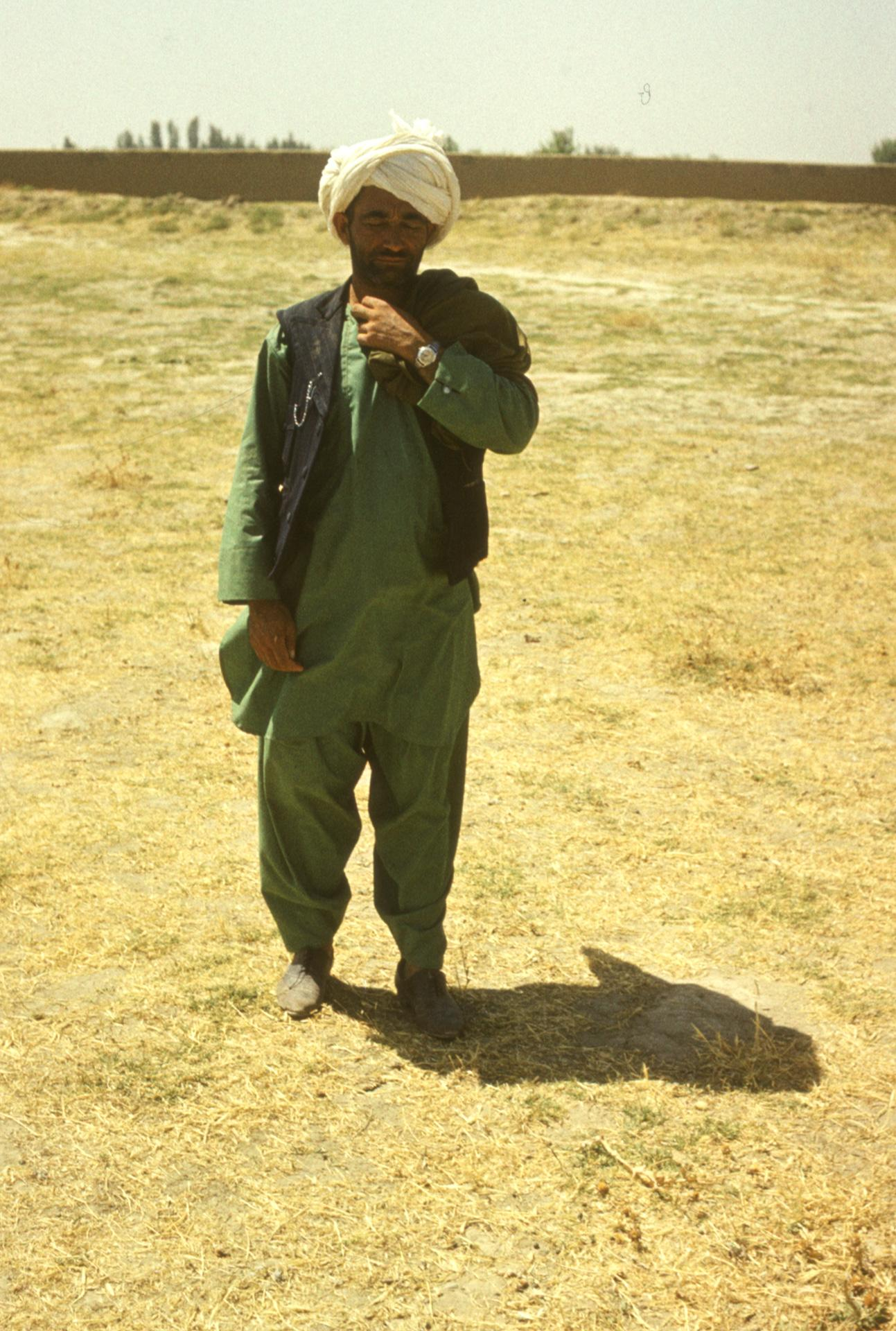
Pasztun - Qajsār - 001621s

=== Kandahari Style ===
The popular embroidered perahan tunban for men is the type worn in Kandahar. The perahan is embroidered in traditional design and the tunban is left plain. This style is believed the most stylish for modern fashion. The men's perahan is finely embroidered in varied geometric patterns.

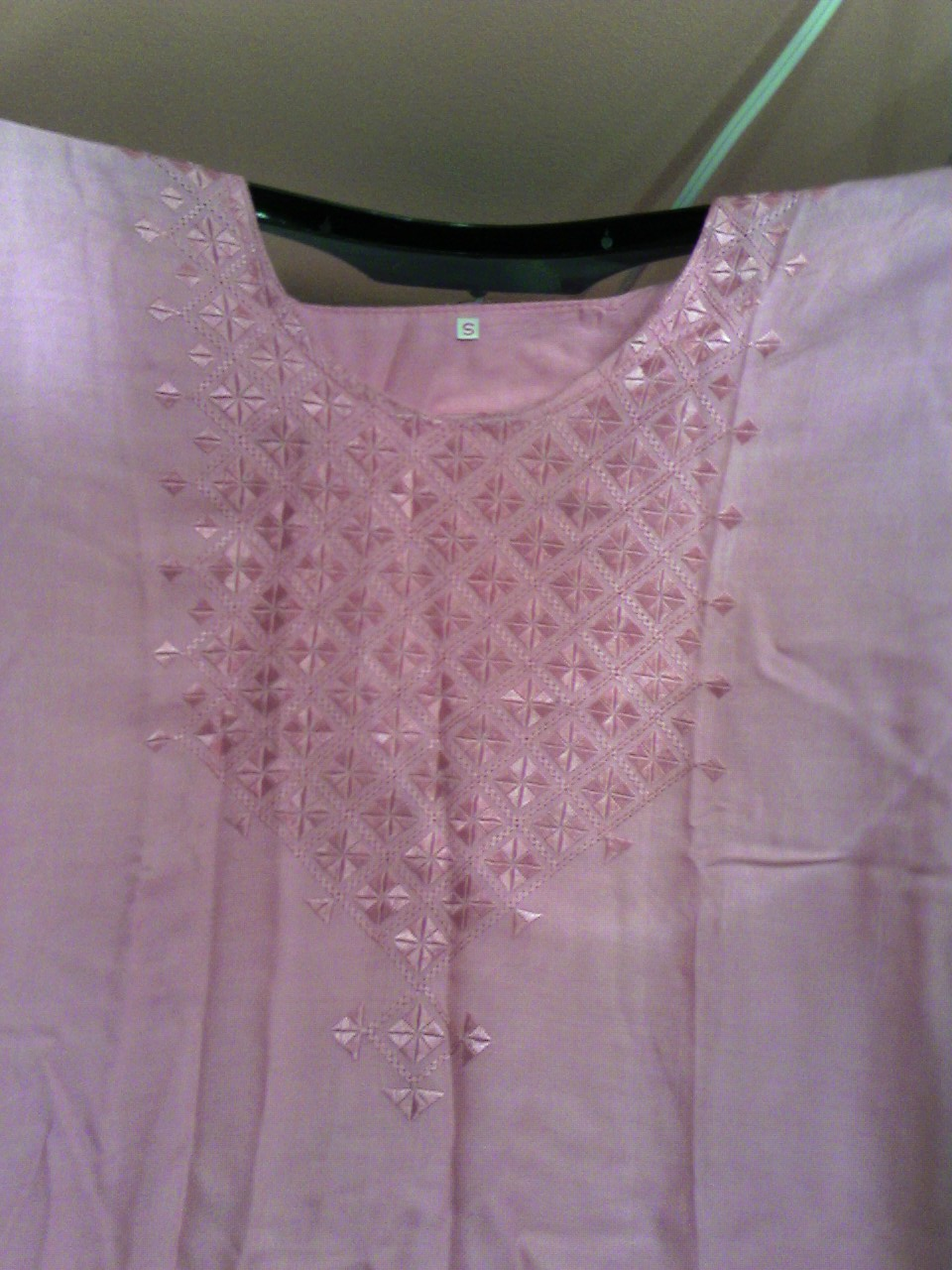
Kandahari doozi

== See also ==
- Pashtun clothing
- Shalwar kameez
