= Zoster (disambiguation) =

Zoster is another name for shingles.

Zoster may also refer to:

- Zoster (Attica), a cape in Attica, Greece
- Zoster (band), a musical group from Bosnia and Herzegovina
- Zoster (costume), a form of girdle or belt in ancient Greece
