= Anagyros (hero) =

Hero worshipped in Attica

In ancient Greek religion and mythology, Anagyros (Ancient Greek: Ἀνάγυρος, romanized: Anáguros) is the eponymous hero of the deme of Anagyrous in Attica, worshipped locally as a lesser deity or a hero. A single tale is attributed to him, in which he punishes a family for cutting down trees from his sacred grove.

Although not much has survived about Anagyros, it is known that his tale inspired two comedies, both lost, including one by Aristophanes during the fifth century BC.

== Etymology ==
The hero's name Ἀνάγυρος is a compound word, made up of the Ancient Greek prefix ἀνα- meaning 'up' or 'back again', and the noun γῦρος, meaning "round", hence stirring. It was also the name of a plant, the stinking bean-trefoil.

== Mythology ==
The sole story of Anagyros says how he took revenge on an elderly settler (a paroikos) and his entire family because he cut down the deity's sacred grove. Anagyros made the elderly man's young concubine fall in love with his son, but the son rejected her advances and would not yield to her. Angered, the concubine reported back to the old man and falsely accused the son of sexually assaulting her. The old man believed her, so he maimed his son in revenge and then he immured him in the house. Then he too took his life by hanging, while the concubine killed herself by jumping into a well and drowning.

In a different but similar version, an unnamed farmer committed some sort of offence against Anagyros in the hero's tomb, so he suffered many misfortunes as punishment. First he divorced his wife, and then, due to a false denunciation of unclear nature by the stepmother, he mutilated his son and cast him off to a desolate island. Facing condemnation from the city, he locked himself up in his house with all his belongings and set it on fire, burning to death inside. Like in the Suda version, the woman threw herself into a well and drowned.

Finally, Zenobius says that Anagyros uprooted the homes of the neighbouring people from their foundations as punishment because they tried to disrespect his shrine.

== In culture ==
Anagyros had a shrine for worship in Anagyrous, and his myth inspired a proverbial phrase, Anagyrasian spirit ("Αναγυράσιος δαίμων"). As anagyros was also the name of a plant, anagyris foetida, that smelled bad when stirred up, another proverb relating to it, "to stir up anagyrus", came to mean to raise a stink or not to let sleeping dogs lie.

According to the author of the Suda, Hieronymus of Rhodes mentioned the myth in his On Tragic Poets, and compared it to Euripides' lost tragedy Phoenix. Homer says that Phoenix slept with his father Amyntor's concubine at the behest of his jealous mother, while later authors, including Euripides in his lost play, made the girl (called Phthia or Clytia) approach the uninterested Phoenix, and once spurned, falsely accuse him to his father, causing Amyntor to blind and exile his son.

This motif, known as 'Potiphar's wife' was popular and common in Greek mythology and other folklore; a woman, usually an already married one, tries and fails to seduce a man and then accuses him of rape or assault. Examples in Greek myth include Hippolytus and Phaedra, Eunostus and Ochne, or Antheus and Cleoboea. A lot of time those false accusations come from a place of hurt pride, though also commonly fear of being reported to their husbands or other male guardians.

=== In ancient Greek theatre ===
Two comedies of the fifth and fourth century BC respectively are known to have been titled Anagyros and dealt with his grim story of revenge, both lost; one was by Aristophanes and produced no earlier than 417 BC, and the other by Diphilus (though Diphilus' might have actually been Anargyros, "penniless"). Aristophanes' play might have been modelled after and intended as a parody of Euripides' play Hippolytus, a tragedy in which Queen Phaedra fails to seduce her husband's son Hippolytus and then accuses him of rape.

As Anagyros' grim tale is rather unsuitable for a comedy, the best evidence for the poorly-preserved comedy's subject comes from the title, the myth connected to the name, and a fragmentary scene that seems to parody Phaedra and the nurse's dialogue from Hippolytus. The myths of Hippolytus and Anagyros are very similar; both feature a man, his son from another woman, a wife, and an offended deity who takes revenge so that the new wife accuses the son of wanton behaviour. Additionally, another tragedy by Euripides that Aristophanes must have used is his Phoenix, which had a similar plot. Several south Italian vases have been identified as potentially depicting scenes from the Anagyros. It is possible that the farmer represented the deme, and his misfortunes the disastrous Sicilian Expedition.

== See also ==
- Philonome
- Orthanes
- Opora

== Bibliography ==
- Apollodorus, The Library, with an English translation by Sir James George Frazer, F.B.A., F.R.S. in 2 Volumes. Cambridge, MA, Harvard University Press; London, William Heinemann Ltd. 1921. Online version at the Perseus Digital Library.
- Bell, Robert E. (1991). Women of Classical Mythology: A Biographical Dictionary. ABC-Clio. ISBN 9780874365818.
- E. L. von Leutsch; F. W. Schneidwein, eds. (1839). Corpus Paroemiographorum Graecorum. Vol. 1. Vandenhoeck et Ruprecht.
- Grimal, Pierre (1987). The Dictionary of Classical Mythology. Wiley-Blackwell. ISBN 0-631-13209-0.
- Hathorn, Richmond Y. (1967). Crowell's Handbook to Classical Drama. New York: Thomas Y. Crowell Company. ISBN 0-690-22501-6.
- Henderson, Jeffrey (2008). Aristophanes: Fragments. Loeb Classical Library 502. Cambridge, Massachusetts: Harvard University Press. ISBN 978-0-674-99615-1.
- Lamari, Anna A.; Montanari, Franco; Novokhatko, Anna (August 10, 2020). Fragmentation in Ancient Greek Drama. de Gruyter. ISBN 978-3-11-062102-0.
- Liddell, Henry George; Scott, Robert (1940). A Greek-English Lexicon, revised and augmented throughout by Sir Henry Stuart Jones with the assistance of Roderick McKenzie. Oxford: Clarendon Press. Online version at Perseus.tufts project.
- Orth, Christian (2020). "Fragmentary Comedy and the Evidence of Vase-Painting". In Lamari, Anna; Montanari, Franco; Novokhatko, Anna (eds.). Fragmentation in Ancient Greek Drama. Trends in Classics – Supplementary Volumes 84. De Gruyter. ISBN 978-3-11-062102-0.
- Quattrocchi, Umberto (2012). CRC World dictionary of medicinal and poisonous plants: common names, scientific names, eponyms, synonyms and etymology. Vol. I, A–C. CRC Press Taylor and Francis Group.
- Rose, Herbert J. (2004). A Handbook of Greek Mythology (6th ed.). London, New York: Routledge. ISBN 0-415-04601-7.
- Sudas, Suda, translated and edited by several authors, including David Whitehead. Suda on Line.
- Trenkner, Sophie (1958). The Greek Novella in the Classical Period. Cambridge, UK: Cambridge University Press. ISBN 9781107438255.
