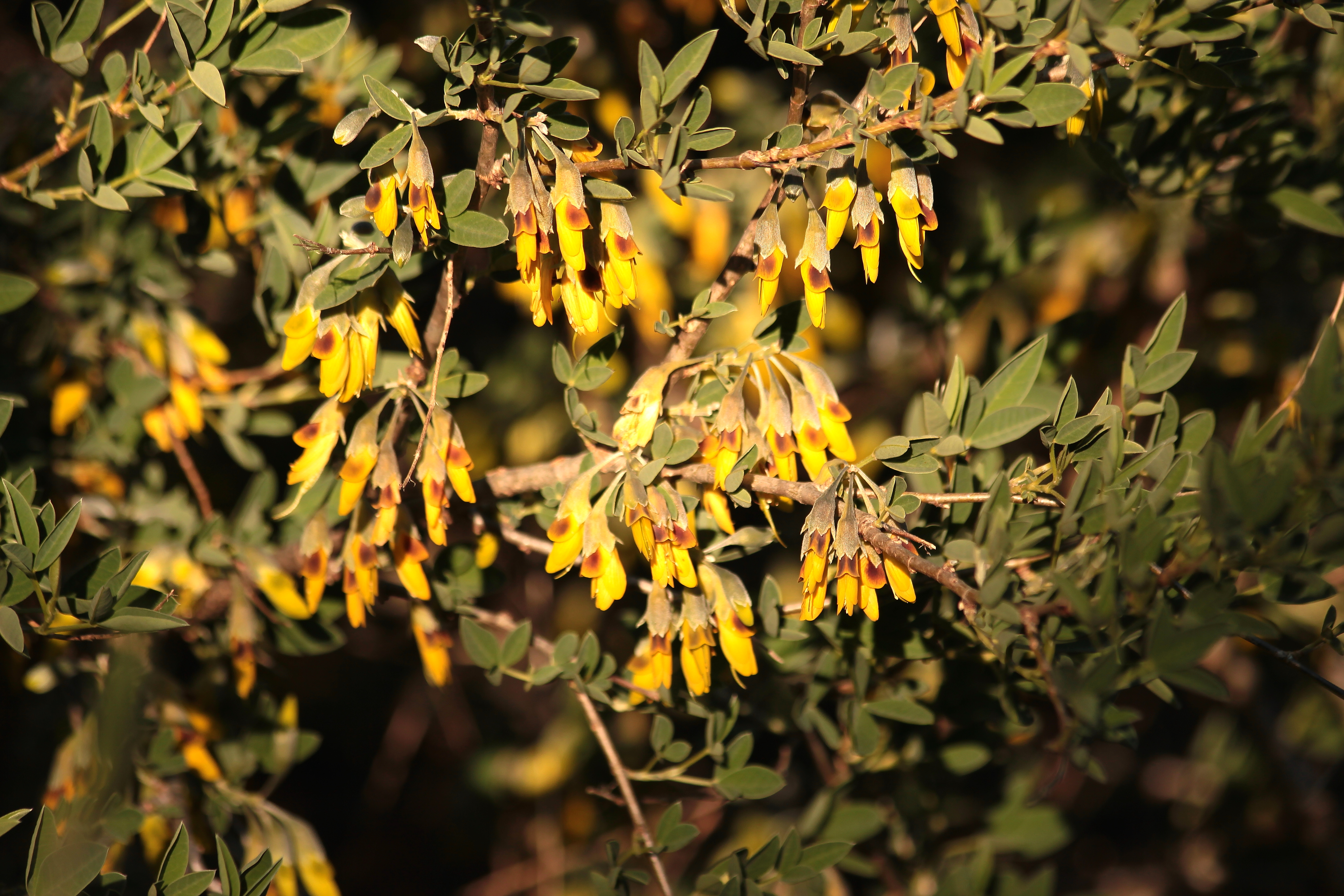

Scientific classification
- Kingdom: Plantae
- Clade: Tracheophytes
- Clade: Angiosperms
- Clade: Eudicots
- Clade: Rosids
- Order: Fabales
- Family: Fabaceae
- Subfamily: Faboideae
- Genus: Anagyris
- Species: A. foetida

Binomial name
- Anagyris foetida L.

= Anagyris foetida =

Species of plant

Anagyris foetida (English common name stinking bean trefoil), is a species of flowering plant in the family Fabaceae, forming a malodorous, Summer-deciduous shrub or small tree 2–4 m in height with green twigs bearing grey-green trifoliate leaves clad beneath in silvery hairs. The red-tinged, yellow, Laburnum-like flowers are borne on the previous season's growth and are pollinated mainly by birds and bees - notably the buff-tailed bumblebee.The large spot of red pigmentation on the flowers is located on the exterior of the standard, the interior of which bears, in turn, many small, deep red spots.

== Scientific Name ==
The genus name Anagyris is a compound of the Ancient Greek prefix ανα (ana-) "up / back again / backwards" and γῦρος (gŷros), "ring" / "round", giving the meaning "bent back into a ring" - in reference to the curved pods of the plant, while the Latin specific name foetida is the feminine form of the adjective foetidus, meaning "stinking" or "smelly" - in reference to the foul stench of the bruised leaves, which is said to resemble that of spoiled beans.

== Common names ==
The shrub has a wide variety of vernacular names in the languages spoken around the Mediterranean, most of them alluding to its foul smell and poisonous properties. Into the former category fall the French bois puant and the Italian legno puzzo – both meaning "stinkwood" - and the Spanish hediondo meaning simply "stinker". Into the latter category (poison-related names) fall two overlapping sub-categories: the first comprising names referencing the similarity in appearance of Anagyris to the carob tree, with its similarly large and pendent pods, and contrasting it unfavourably with that edible species, and the second, pejorative names containing the names of animals perceived as being in some way noxious. A purely carob-related name is the Italian carrubazzo meaning "bad carob", the suffix -azzo providing the pejorative sense, as in ragazzo now "boy", but with the original sense of "lout", "street urchin" or "slave". Carob-and-animal names include the Arabic kharroub kelb / karrûb el klâb "carob of the dog", kharroub el-khinzir "carob of the pig" and kharroub el-maiz "carob of the goat". Animal-and-bean names include the French fève de loup "bean of the wolf" and the Maltese fula tal-klieb and Arabic fûl el klâb, both meaning "bean of the dog". Of dog-related plant names it may be noted that in Europe these generally convey a perceived inferiority of some sort when compared to plants fit for humans e.g. a dog rose is scentless and dog's mercury (as opposed to the true mercury plant) is poisonous. Likewise in the Arab world the dog is deemed a dirty animal which feeds on carrion and other unclean things and is itself unfit for human consumption - whence the Arabic language insults kelb and ibn al kalb ("dog" and "son of a dog", respectively). Regarding the Arab conception of the "carob of the pig", it may further be noted that the pig is the only animal the meat of which is explicitly condemned as haram in the Quran (Quran 2:173) (see also Islamic dietary laws).

== Distribution ==
The plant has a circum-Mediterranean distribution in Europe and North Africa, with extensions into Turkey, Iran and the Arabian peninsula.

== Habitat ==
A. foetida is a tropical or subtropical relict species from the Tertiary period ( a status suggested (i.a.) by its unusually large and heavy seeds), which suggests that its original homeland may have lain somewhere in the refugium encompassing the Balkans, Türkiye and the Black Sea coastal region of the Caucasus. The picture is complicated by the fact that it is also an archaeophyte (ancient introduction - original homeland uncertain). In France, it is a rare and protected species now found only in coastal départements, although it once grew also in Alpes-Maritimes where it is now extinct. It grows in calcareous soils in seasonally arid areas exposed to the hottest summer sun, favouring rocky limestone escarpments (as currently at Mont Faron), often among the ruins of castles and abbeys (see also monastic garden), suggesting that it may be a relic of cultivation for medicinal purposes or even to furnish an arrow poison for military use.

== Adaptations to growth in Winter and early Spring ==
=== Summer leaf-fall ===
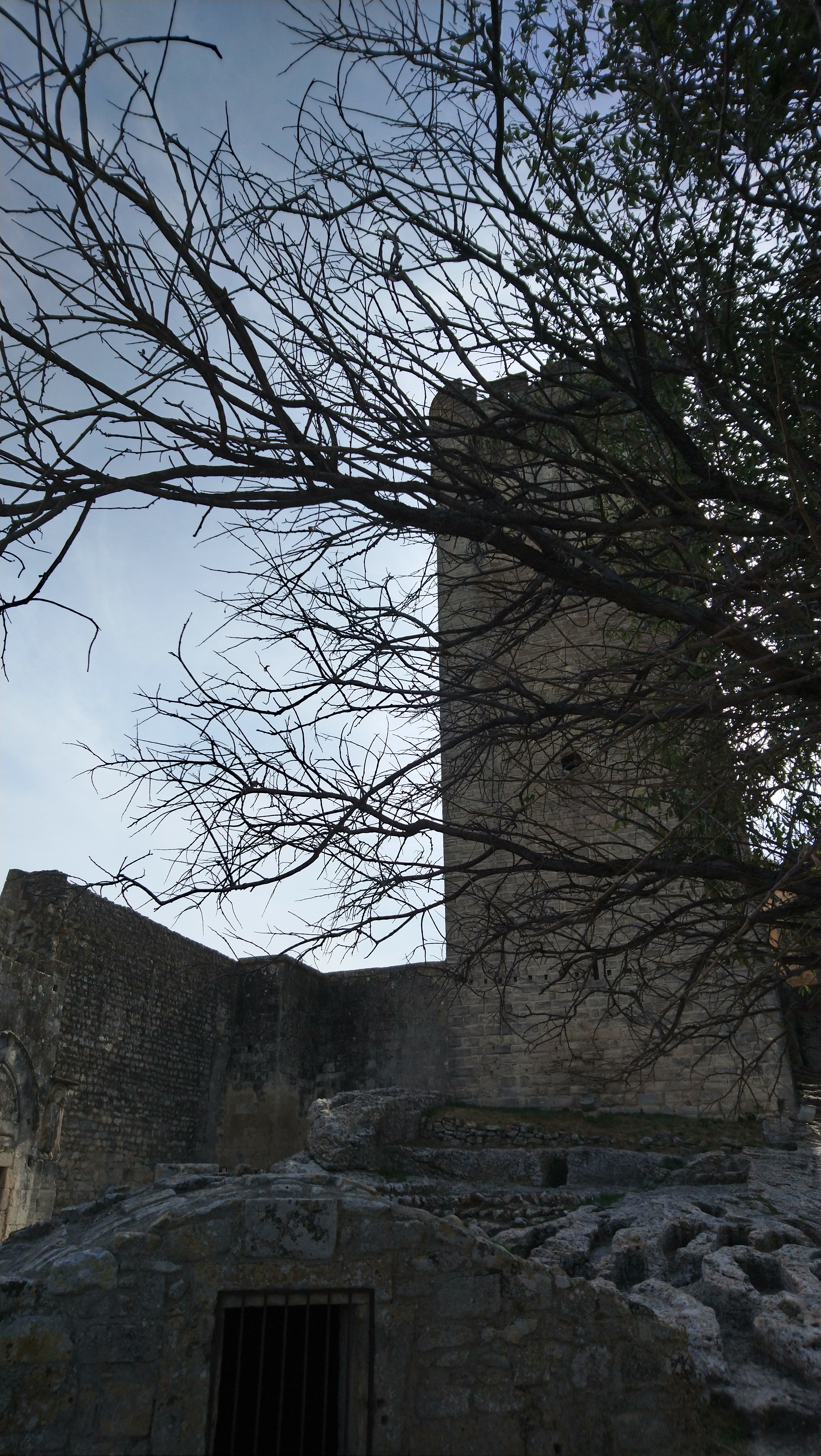
Mature specimen showing branches bare from Summer-deciduous adaptation to drought. Arles, France

Anagyris foetida is an ultra drought-tolerant member of the Fabaceae family. The large shrub originates in the Mediterranean Basin. The plant illustrates one of the best drought-resisting strategies of mediterranean flora: the plant keeps its leaves through autumn, winter and spring, then it goes completely deciduous in summer, becoming dormant and highly resistant to drought.

This pattern of aestivation (summer dormancy) is more characteristic of many Mediterranean bulbs than it is of the majority of Mediterranean shrubs, which have often adopted the different strategy of sclerophylly to cope with high Summer temperatures and drought.

=== Pollination by birds ===
Canon Fournier noted as early as 1947 that A. foetida was primarily bird-pollinated. This was substantiated by Ortega-Olivencia et al. who carried out a study of the pollinators visiting two populations of the plant in Southwest Spain over a three-year period and recorded their findings in a paper of 2005. Such bird-pollination (ornithophily) is, so far, unique among the thousands of plant species comprising the Flora of Europe. The avian pollinators recorded in the study were three passerine species: the Common chiffchaff, the Eurasian blackcap and the Sardinian warbler. Relevant in this context are the red markings on the flowers of A. foetida, red being a colour particularly noticeable by (and therefore attractive to) birds, with their tetrachromat vision. The authors offer the following plausible explanation for the unusual form of pollination which has evolved in the case of A. foetida:

The negligible existence of insect visitors and pollinators of A. foetida flowers could be explained by the early flowering of this species during the autumn–winter, coinciding with the coolest and wettest months of the year (cold, high winds, almost daily mists that persist until nightfall, and above all, abundant rainfall).

A complementary study of a similar kind undertaken by Haran et al. in Israel in 2018 revealed yet further bird species involved in the pollination of A. foetida, along with a single species which steals nectar from the flowers while seldom acting as a pollen vector. In addition to the Common chiffchaff, the Eurasian Blackcap and the Sardinian Warbler the Israeli study documents another six pollinating species: the White-spectacled bulbul, the Spanish Sparrow, the Common whitethroat, the Lesser whitethroat, Rüppell's warbler and the Eastern Orphean warbler. The species found generally to operate as a nectar thief was the Palestine sunbird (in consequence of its longer bill), although even it could act as a pollinator, on occasion. As in Spain, bird pollination is explicable by the plant's flowering at a time when weather and temperatures are uncongenial to insect activity: the plant is almost the only shrub in the eastern Mediterranean region that flowers in winter.

== Seed dispersal ==
The fruits of this species mature at the beginning of Summer, and are dispersed by simple fall under gravity. The process of fruit abscission lasts about a month, although really most of the fruits fall in the first two weeks. The fruits are indehiscent and, if they are not eaten by livestock, remain on the ground. After the heat of summer and the arrival of autumnal rains, the papyraceous–coriaceous pericarp (papery, corky pod) begins to rot, passing from brown to blackish in colour, and leaving the seeds exposed. These are large in size, very hard, and of an attractive bluish or violet-bluish colour. At least at present and in the populations studied, A. foetida shows no specialized dispersal mechanism, as is the case in many species of the Iberian Peninsula

- thus Ortega-Olivencia, Valtueña and Rodríguez-Riaño in their data-rich paper of 2008 attempting to account for the relative rarity and decline of Anagyris foetida in Spain - the study focussing on populations of the plant in Andalusia and Valencia. The authors are cautious in applying conclusions drawn from data gathered solely in Spain, but nonetheless offer pointers for future research in other countries where the plant is native.

=== Soil seed banks ===
The authors sought to determine whether the plant could form a soil seed bank, while doubting that this could be possible, given the large size and high surface-to-volume ratio of the somewhat flattened, reniform seeds, which would be likely to hinder their slipping through gaps in the soil and their sinking in soil through the action of earthworms and other soil organisms. Their doubts, however, proved unfounded: since the species could indeed form seed banks through two mechanisms: first the seed could sink during the rainy season, when the soil became waterlogged and colloidal, and secondly there emerged evidence that moles were involved in seed burial when they raised molehills while digging their burrows during the winter months, although this occurred only in areas where the soil had not been overly compacted by the trampling of livestock.

=== Olive mimicry ===
While the authors were unable to discover a seed dispersal vector for the plant in Spain, they did discover an intriguing strategy encouraging endozoochory (consumption of seeds followed by defecation at a distance) that suggested that a species of bird might be involved. The large blue-black seeds of Anagyris foetida bear a strong resemblance (particularly when seen from a distance) to the fruits of Olea europaea var. sylvestris, the wild olive, which, being fleshy, brightly coloured and lipid-rich, have typical characteristics of fruits encouraging dispersal by birds.

The similarity between these fruits and the seeds of Anagyris could lead to dispersal of the seeds of Anagyris by birds in habitats where Olive and Anagyris coexist and are abundant (they are frequently found in the same habitat), because of the birds confusing them with the fruits of Olea. Nevertheless, the test of this hypothesis did not give a positive result in the population studied...

While the authors failed to observe any birds which are habitual consumers of black olives in Spain consuming Anagyris seeds in error, they do not rule out the role of olive mimicry in seed dispersal in other Mediterranean countries where both Anagyris and Olea are present. (See also Vavilovian mimicry).

=== Role of sheep ===
Few seeds can sink to the seed bank in the soil due to the intense pressure of predation by sheep. This is due principally to the shrubby habit of the plants and constant presence of sheep (always present during the period of ripening of the fruits, when predation has the most negative effect).

In Spain, sheep proved to have both negative and positive effects upon seed production and germination. On the negative side, the animals showed a predilection for browsing on unripe pods (at which stage of development the seeds have not yet acquired a hard testa) and thus destroyed, by mastication, a great many seeds before these had had a chance to ripen. On the positive side, in years of drought, when there was no grass upon which they could graze, sheep would resort to eating fallen pods containing ripe seeds. This suggested to the authors that sheep might be involved in endozoochoric seed dispersal, but examination of their droppings failed to reveal any ripe seeds that had passed through their guts (which would have involved their being exposed to acid scarification in the animals' stomachs). However, the authors discovered that, in consuming the ripe, fallen pods, the sheep had swallowed the pericarps, but spat out the ripe seeds, having (sometimes) chewed them enough to rupture their leathery testae (seed coats) but not enough to kill the embryos in them - thus improving their rate of germination by up to 48%.

=== Other possible mammalian and avian vectors ===
The authors note that horses and cattle play no role in seed dispersal, because they do not browse on the fruits of A. foetida. They speculate that, in habitats modified less by agriculture than those of the Spanish locales in which they carried out their research, other mammals, such as deer, foxes and hares might be involved (indeed, they do not even rule out sheep completely as vectors elsewhere in the plant's range). Olive mimicry by the seeds might suggest the existence of an avian vector of some kind, but in that instance, scarification would be purely chemical (by stomach acid), not involving mastication, as the seeds would be swallowed whole, without any preliminary chewing. Such chemical scarification by a bird would be less effective than mechanical scarification by the teeth of a mammal in rupturing the seed coat to facilitate imbibition.

=== Unknown seed dispersal vector ===
In Spain, the dispersers of A. foetida fruit remain unknown, although this does not mean that the species does not possess them in other populations in its area of distribution. If it still exists [italics added], this disperser is likely to be a mammal since the latency of the seeds of this species, which are hard and impermeable, is broken physically through biting and by the action of stomach acid.

As the above makes plain, the principal disperser or dispersers of A. foetida may actually be extinct, which conclusion would go some way toward accounting for its relative rarity and would fit with its status as an archaeophyte possibly no longer to be found growing in a truly wild state.

=== Tough, waterproof seed coats ===
As suggested by their accumulation in soil seed banks, the seeds of A. foetida have tough, waterproof testae (seed coats) which enable them to remain viable for a long time. The authors demonstrated this water-resistance clearly by immersing a batch of unscarified seeds (i.e., seeds with undamaged seed coats) in a beaker of water for no fewer than four years - without the least ensuing sign of imbibition (water uptake necessary for the initiation of germination). Scarification of the seeds before their immersion (whether chemically by acids or mechanically by nicking, filing or similar damage from the teeth of sheep) on the other hand, could result in complete imbibition within 48 hours - this being indicated by colour change. The fully-imbibed seeds swelled and lost their purple-black, olive-like tones as the anthocyanin pigments responsible for this colouration leached away into the water, leaving the swollen seeds cream-coloured - and thus no longer potentially attractive to birds fooled by olive mimicry. These anthocyanin pigments not only mimic the dark colours of black olives, but also confer resistance to pathogens, since they possess antibacterial properties providing a measure of protection of the seed coats from breakdown by soil bacteria.

== Value as a nitrogen-fixing pioneer and companion plant ==
A. foetida will tolerate a wide variety of soils and has been grown as a fast-growing, nitrogen-fixing pioneer species in the large-scale restoration of fire-damaged areas in Southern Europe, using native species. It has also been planted at high densities as a nitrogen-fixing companion plant (albeit a very toxic one) among fruit and nut trees.

== Medicinal use ==
The blossom smells strongly of cabbage, and all parts of the plant were used medicinally, particularly in cases surrounding childbirth problems.

The first to write an account of the folk medicinal properties of A. foetida was Ancient Greek herbalist and physician Pedanius Dioscorides in his monumental work De materia medica. He lists the names onaguris, anaguris, anagyros, acopon, and agnacopum for the shrub and records distinct uses for the leaves, root and seeds. Concerning the leaves, he recommends a poultice of the young foliage to treat oedema and an infusion of a small quantity of the leaves in raisin wine to treat asthma, headache and delayed menstruation. He further records two uses of the leaves suggesting uterine stimulant properties: an aid to placental expulsion and an abortifacient. Of the root, he writes that it "dissolves and ripens" (presumably in reference to tumours and boils, although this is not specifically stated). His statement "It is hung as an amulet on those who have hard labour, yet one must at once (after the woman's delivery) take off the amulet and put it away" presumably also refers to the root, although it is possible that other plant parts are also intended (contact between plant parts and bare skin could conceivably lead to some degree of absorption of active constituents). Concerning the seeds, he says only that their consumption causes excessive vomiting.

Eminent French botanist Professor Canon Paul-Victor Fournier (1877-1964) devotes two pages of his three-volume work on the medicinal and poisonous plants of France (published in 1947) to the uses and toxicity of the plant.

The seeds of the plant were formerly employed as an emetic (which Renaissance doctor and botanist Matthiolus observed was so violent in its action that it could cause internal bleeding), while an infusion of the leaves was used as a purgative, but neither use should be considered safe, given the extreme toxicity of the species.

== Toxicity ==
The alkaloid anagyrine, present in the seeds, causes, in warm-blooded animals, first slowing of the breathing and heartbeat and ultimately cessation of respiration and cardiac arrest.

=== Alkaloid anagyrine a cause of birth defects ===
As the specific name foetida (as do various common names in European languages) indicates, the foliage emits an unpleasant smell when brushed against or handled. The plant is very poisonous, containing a variety of quinolizidine alkaloids, including the teratogenic anagyrine (named for the genus Anagyris and occurring also in certain toxic species belonging to the genus Lupinus). The highest concentration of the toxins occurs in the greenish-purple, bean-like seeds, while the second highest occurs in the bark of the root and the lowest concentration in the petals of the flower. In the course of his research undertaken in 1895, Guérin conducted a thorough investigation into the distribution of anagyrine in the tissues of the plant and concluded that the toxic alkaloid was almost ubiquitous, being present in almost all tissues of the plant at all stages of growth, from seed to mature tree - this in contrast to alkaloid distribution in other notably alkaloidal plants such Nicotiana and Papaver species.

=== Danger to children ===
The shrub should not be grown in areas where children play because they may be tempted by the bean-like appearance of the seed pods to nibble the attractive seeds, with potentially fatal consequences (- the most dangerous poisonous plants are those combining high toxicity with fruits resembling those of edible species).

=== Hazardous tainting of milk products ===
As canon Fournier points out, stock generally avoid browsing upon the plant because of its unpleasant smell and taste, this being fortunate for humans, for, on the rare occasions when ewes have been forced, by hunger and the unavailability of other fodder, to consume the plant in quantity, their milk has become not merely tainted, but poisonous. Persons who have eaten cheese prepared from such milk have suffered violent vomiting, and, on occasion, (unspecified) symptoms of an even more severe nature.

=== Case of accidental poisoning in Algeria ===
Trotter mentions, in passing (and without further elaboration), a case of accidental poisoning by the plant recorded in a work of Vesque's: a group of hungry soldiers, foraging for edible wild plants while stationed in Algeria, mistook the seeds of A. foetida for beans, with grave consequences.

== Cultural references: Anagyris and Anagyrous ==
=== Lysistrata ===
That the plant was deemed proverbially smelly in Ancient Greece is demonstrated by a punning exchange near the beginning of the celebrated comedy of circa 411BCE Lysistrata, by the playwright Aristophanes:

[Several women enter, headed by MYRRHINA, from the deme (=suburb) of Anagyrous. Others soon follow.]

CALONICE: Hi ! but they're coming now : here they all are : First one, and then another - hoity-toity! Where are this lot from?

LYSISTRATA: From Anagyrous.

CALONICE: Aha! Well, at any rate we've "stirred up Anagyrous" [homophonic pun upon the plant name "Anagyris"]. *

- Note: κινεῖν τὸν ἀνάγυρον (kinein tòn anáguron) "To stir up [shake] the Anagyris" (meaning the nauseous-smelling shrub Anagyris foetida) was a proverb, used of persons who brought some unpleasantness on themselves [compare "Let sleeping dogs lie"]. Calonice applies the proverb to the [similarly named] deme [=suburb], meaning that the influx of Anagyrasian women proved that the deme [suburb of ancient Athens] Anagyrous was thoroughly stirred up [i.e. in uproar/out on the street].

Further layers of meaning can be guessed at in the pun: some commentators have inferred that the Athenian suburb of Anagyrus may have been so named because the rank-smelling Anagyris grew plentifully there: others that a playful (possibly traditional) jibe at the inhabitants of Anagyrus may have been intended - to the effect that the Anagyrasians were notably smelly, because their personal hygiene was poor. [Aristophanes may here be referencing an in-joke that his Athenian audience would have appreciated].

There are two theories concerning the etymology of the suburb name Anagyrous punned upon in Lysistrata (as quoted above): first that it was named for an eponymous hero Anagyrous, famed for exacting a terrible revenge upon those who had cut branches from the sacred grove dedicated to him, and secondly that it was actually named for the foul-smelling shrub Anagyris that grew there in such profusion. More light might have been cast on the matter by a lost play by Aristophanes entitled Anagyrous and devoted to the deeds of the vengeful hero. However a measure of confusion over the title of a second play possibly devoted to the same hero makes plain the availability to Aristophanes of a second pun at the expense of the Anagyrasians: the playwright Diphilus also wrote a play entitled Anagyrous, but it remains uncertain whether the title was actually Anargyrous - the insertion of a second 'r' changing the meaning to 'without silver' (prefix αν 'without' + ἁργυρυσ 'silver') i.e. 'penniless' or 'impoverished'. Such wordplay could lend itself both to a comic characterisation of the hero Anagyrous as a ne'er-do-well and/or of the inhabitants of the suburb named for him as paupers.

=== Persistence of name ===
The shrub of Anagyrous groweth near all the great roads of the isle, so stinking that it maketh the head to ache, and there doth keep its ancient name, for the common people do call it "Anagyros". So vile its savour that the very famished goats feed not upon it.

Thus writes Pierre Belon (1517–1564), French diplomat, traveller, and pioneering naturalist, in an essay devoted to the notable plants of the area surrounding Mount Ida (now known as Psiloritis) on the island of Crete, which forms part of his Observations - a work devoted to the noteworthy things which he observed during his travels in Arabia, Greece and the countries of the Eastern Mediterranean.

== Gallery ==
=== Anagyris foetida ===
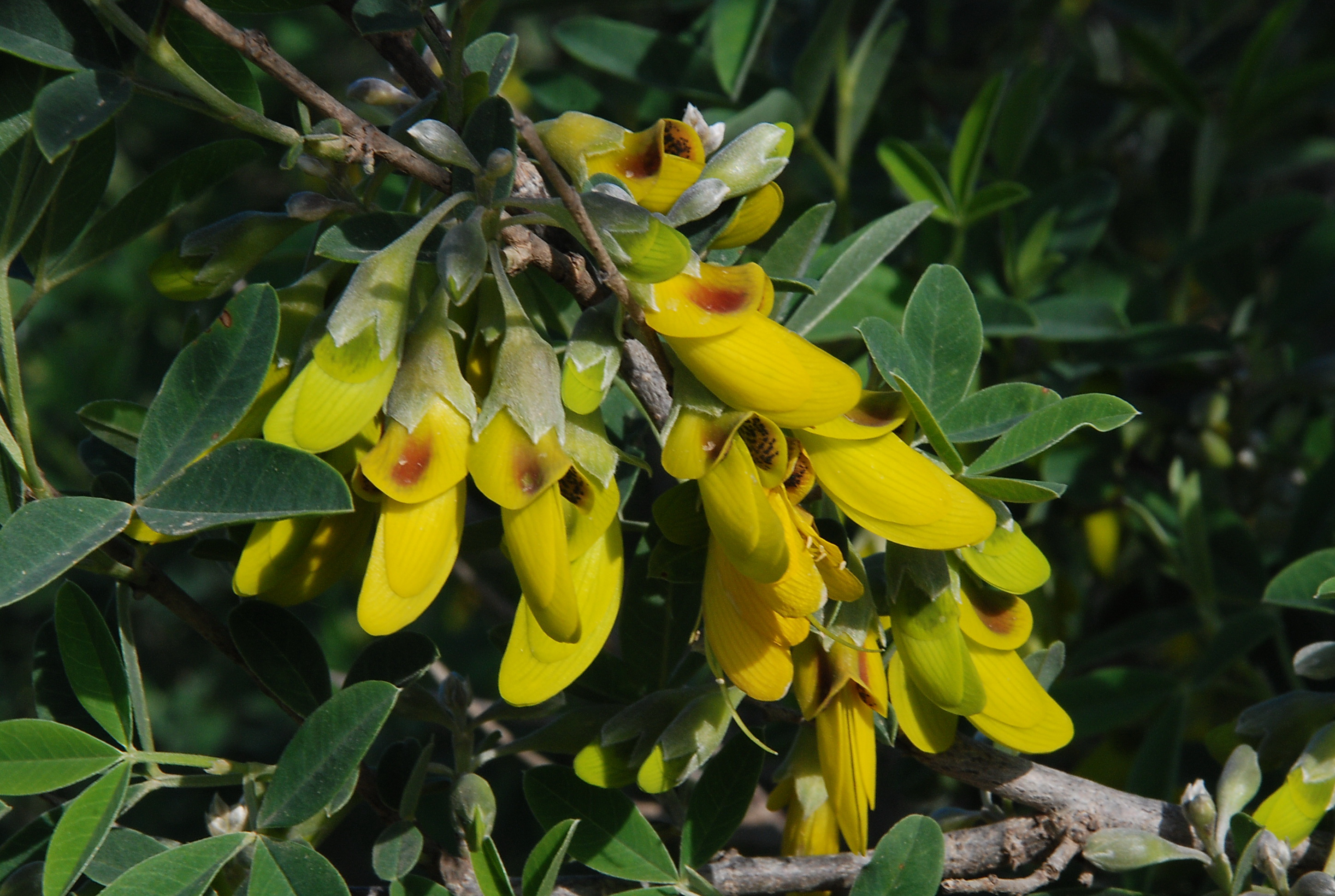
Closeup of flower cluster, showing red markings on standard attractive to avian pollinators

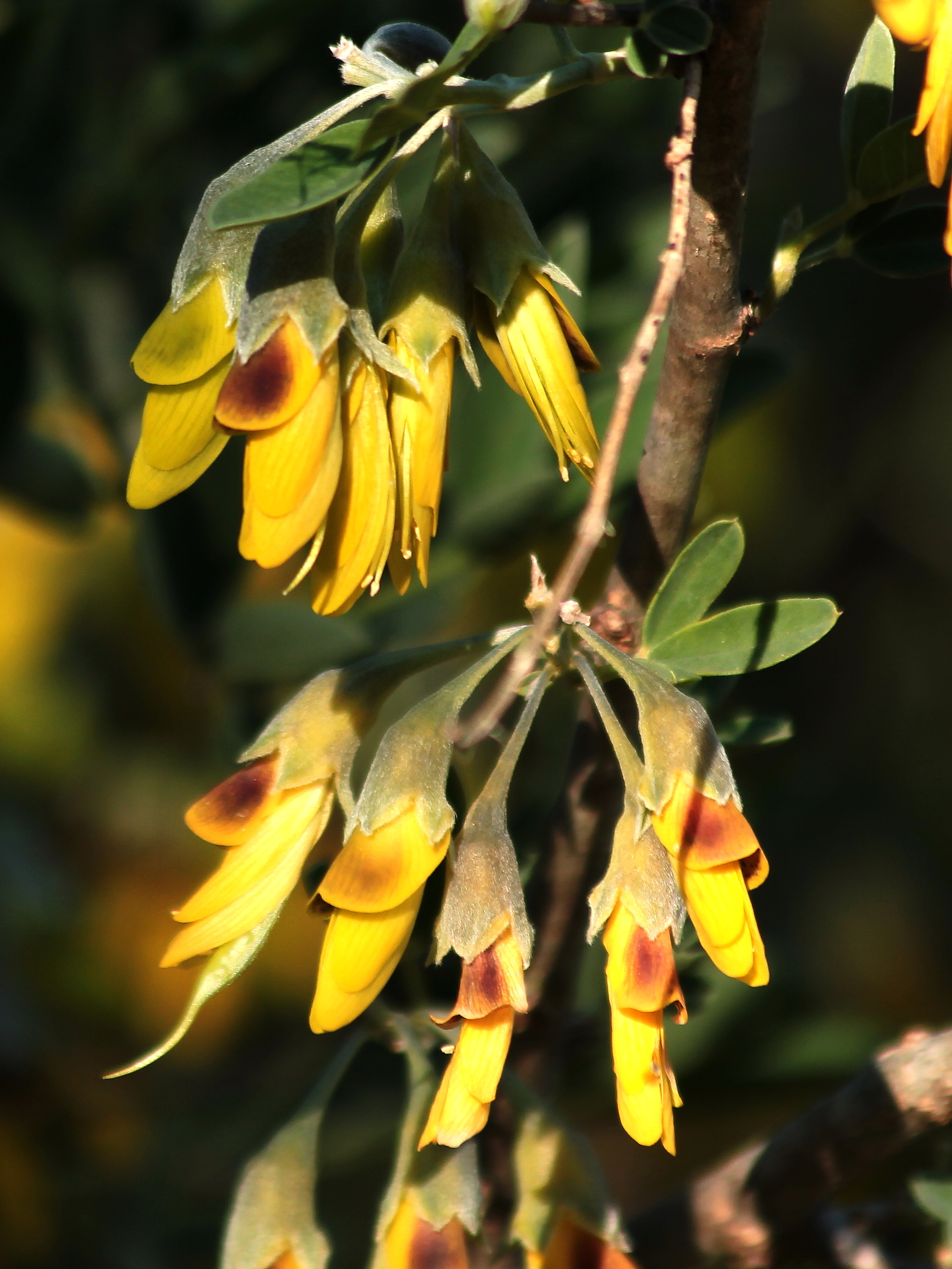
Closeup of flowers showing stamens and a young, protruding pod

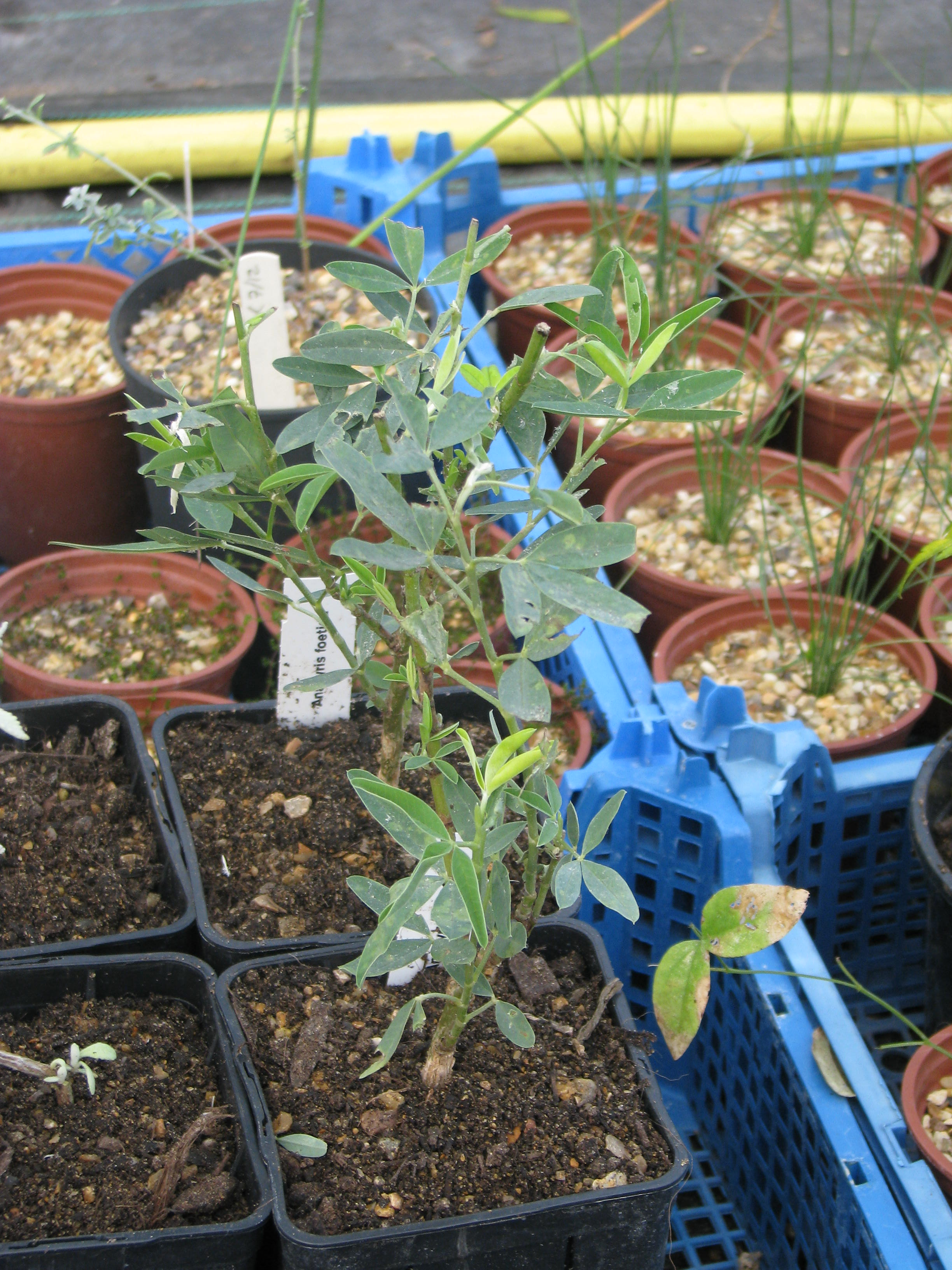
Containerised sapling, showing young foliage

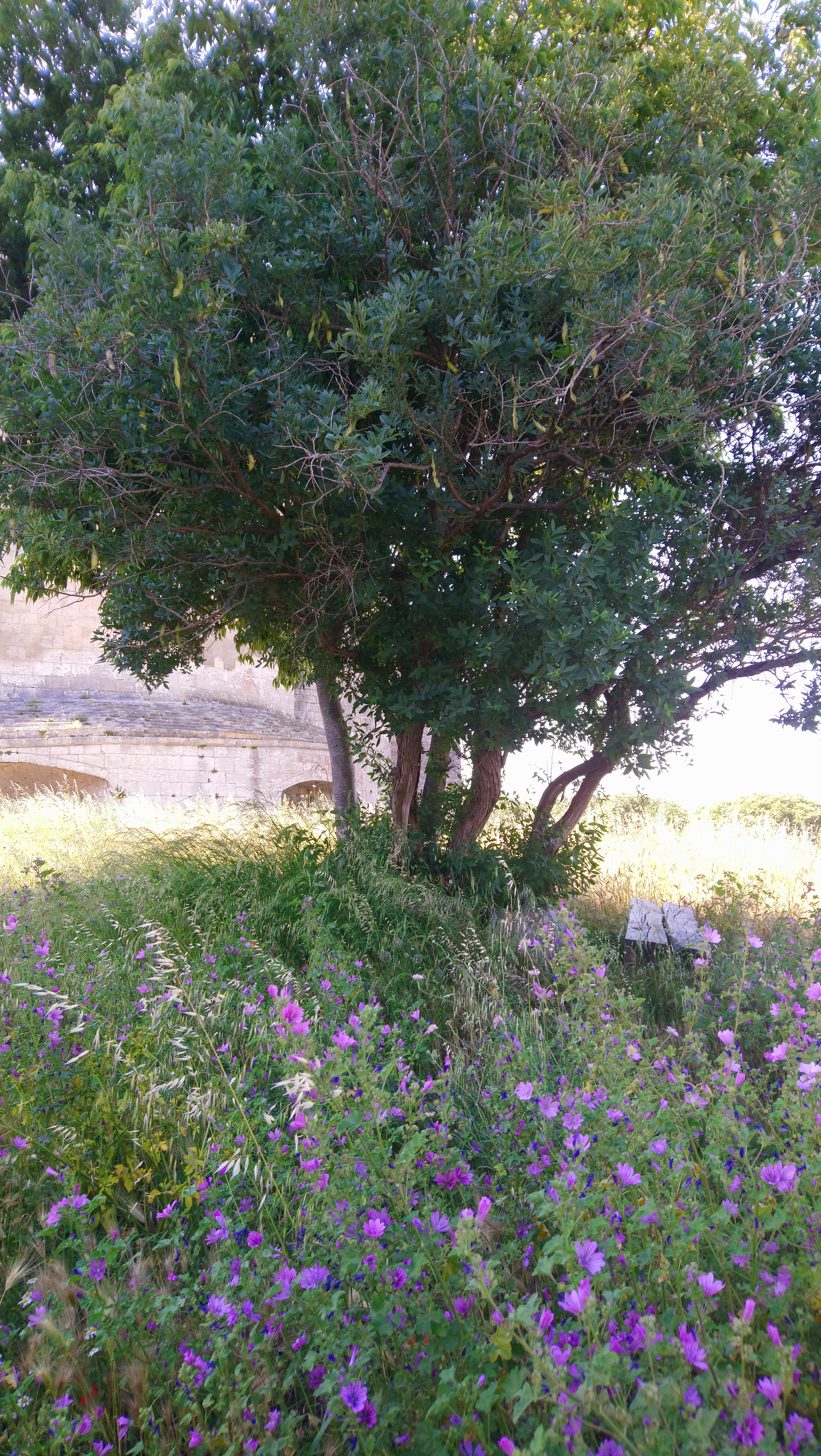
Mature shrubby specimen festooned with ripening pods

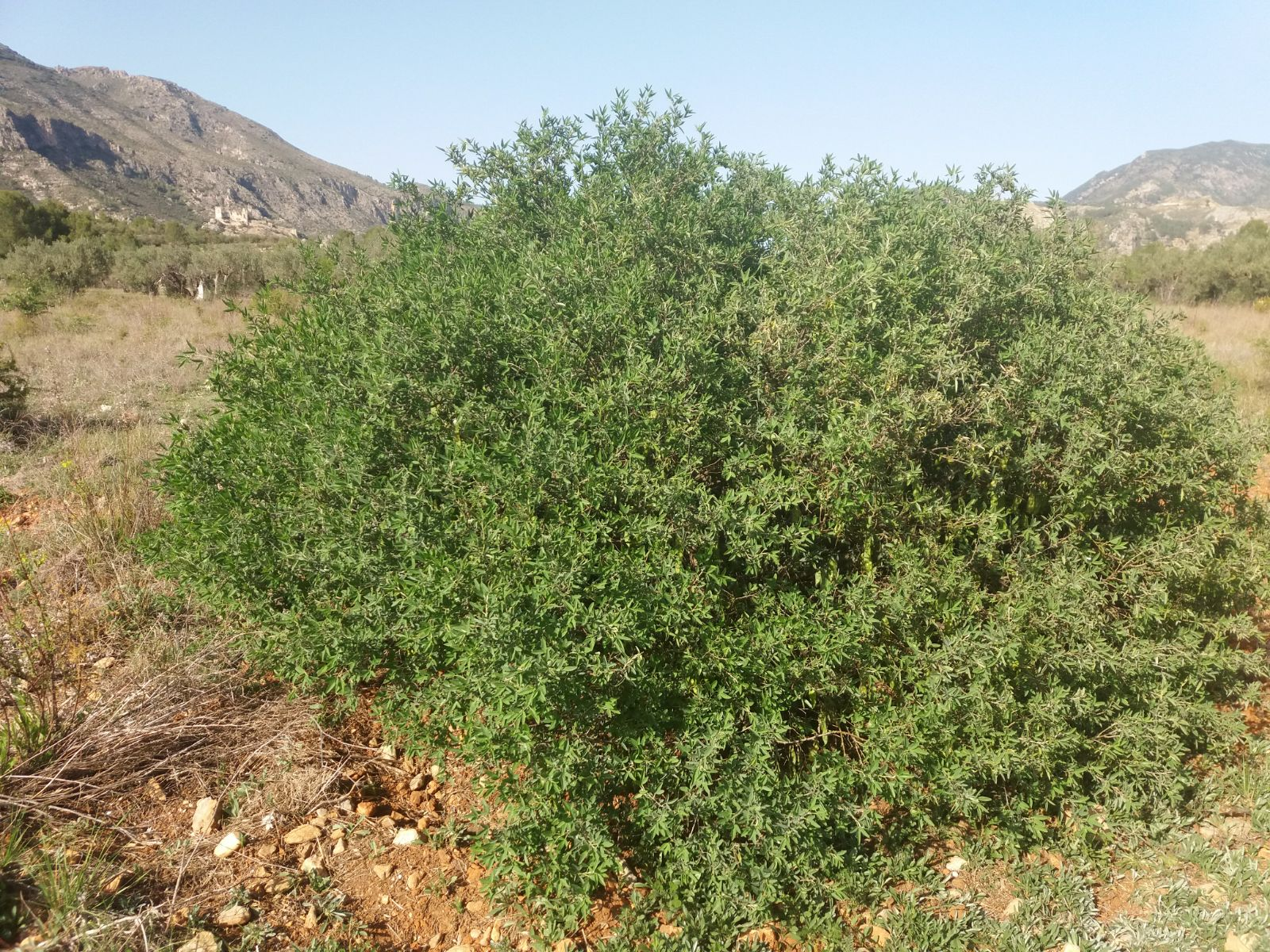
Low-growing, wild specimen, showing spreading canopy of grey-green foliage

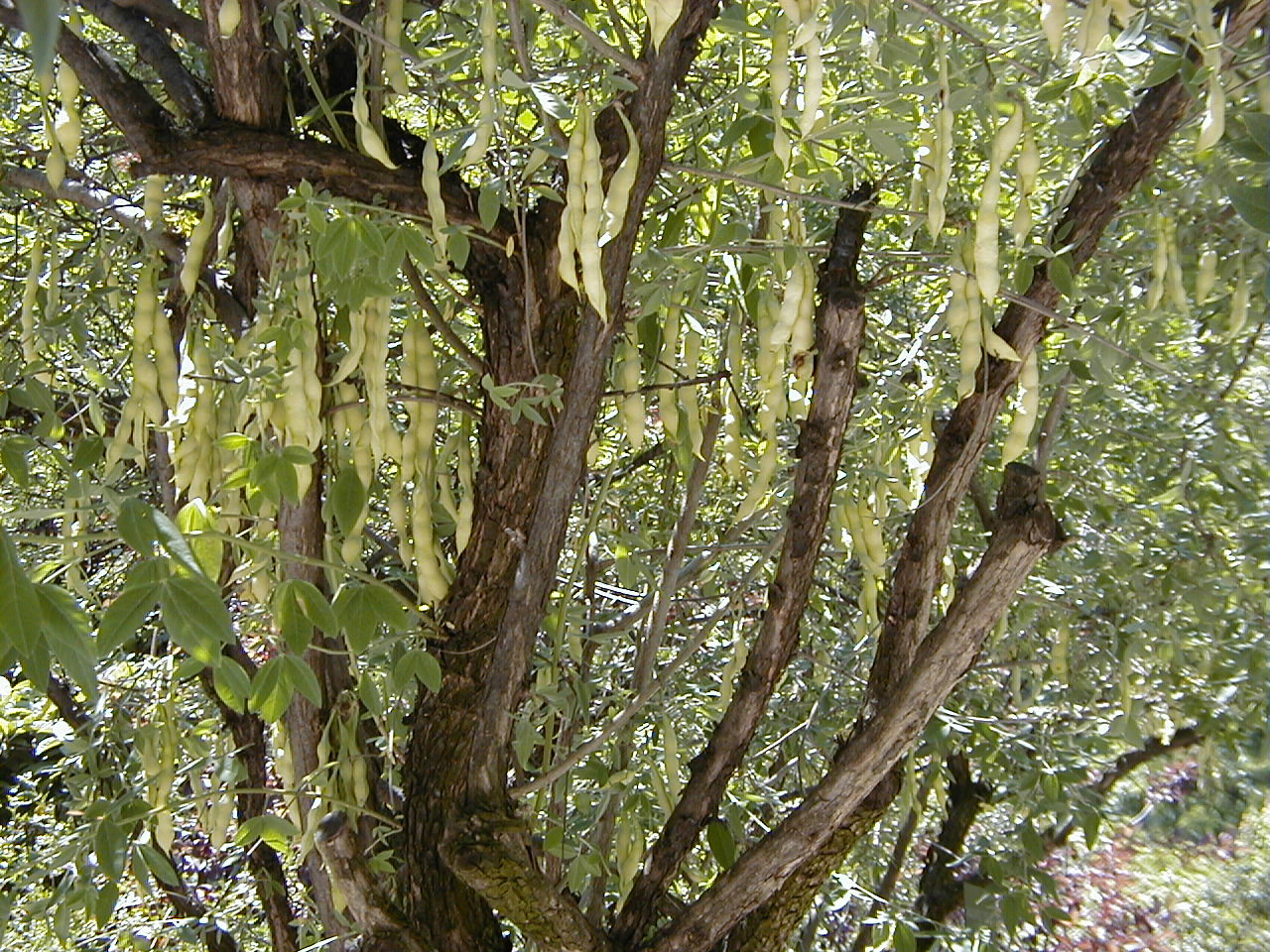
Canopy viewed from beneath, showing bark, foliage and ripening pods

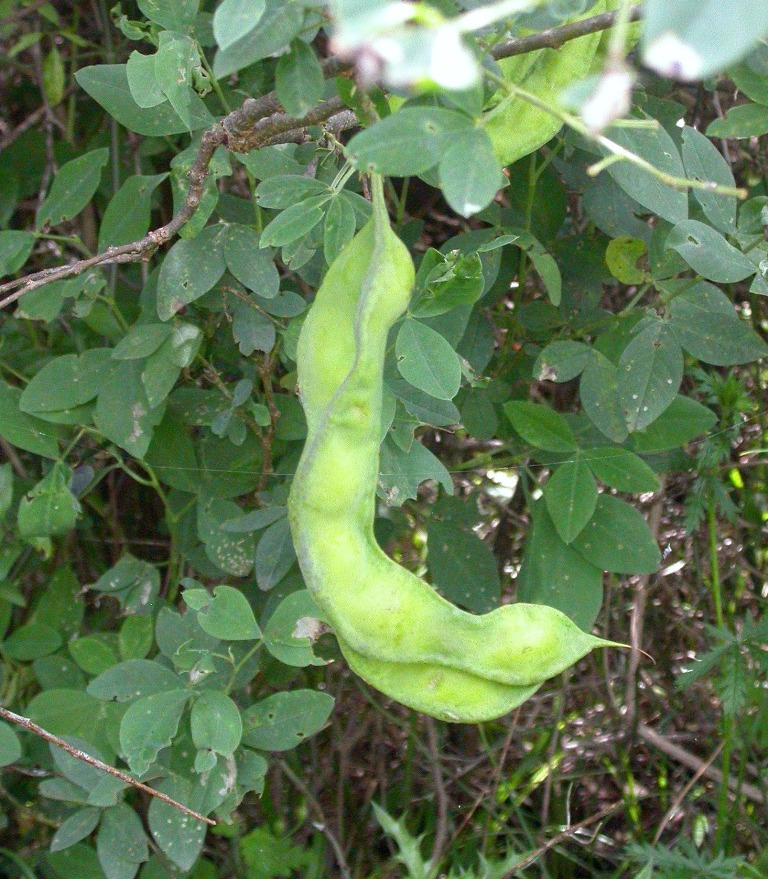
Unripe, paired pods, hanging among proverbially unpleasant-smelling foliage.

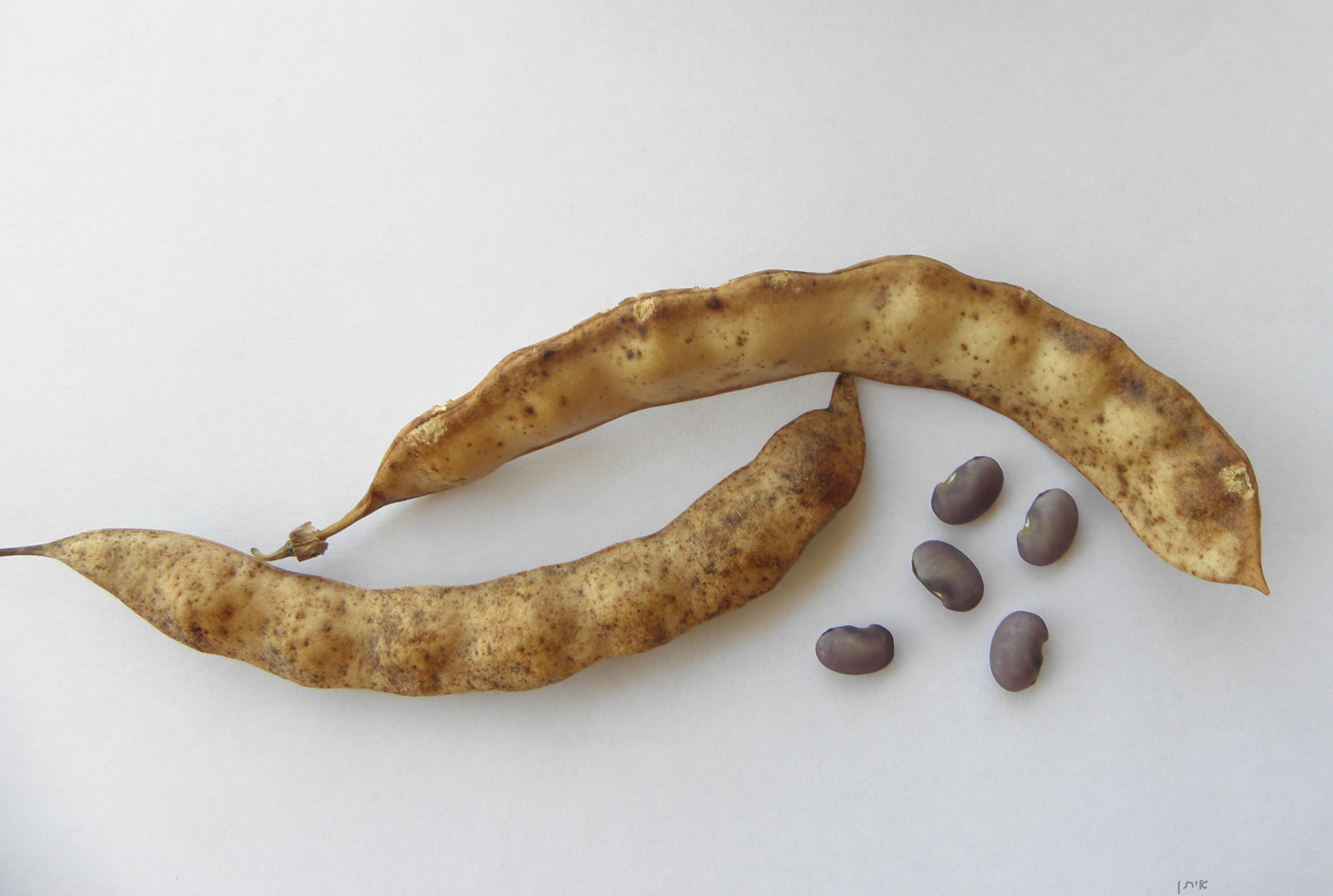
Ripe pods juxtaposed with ripe, bean-like seeds

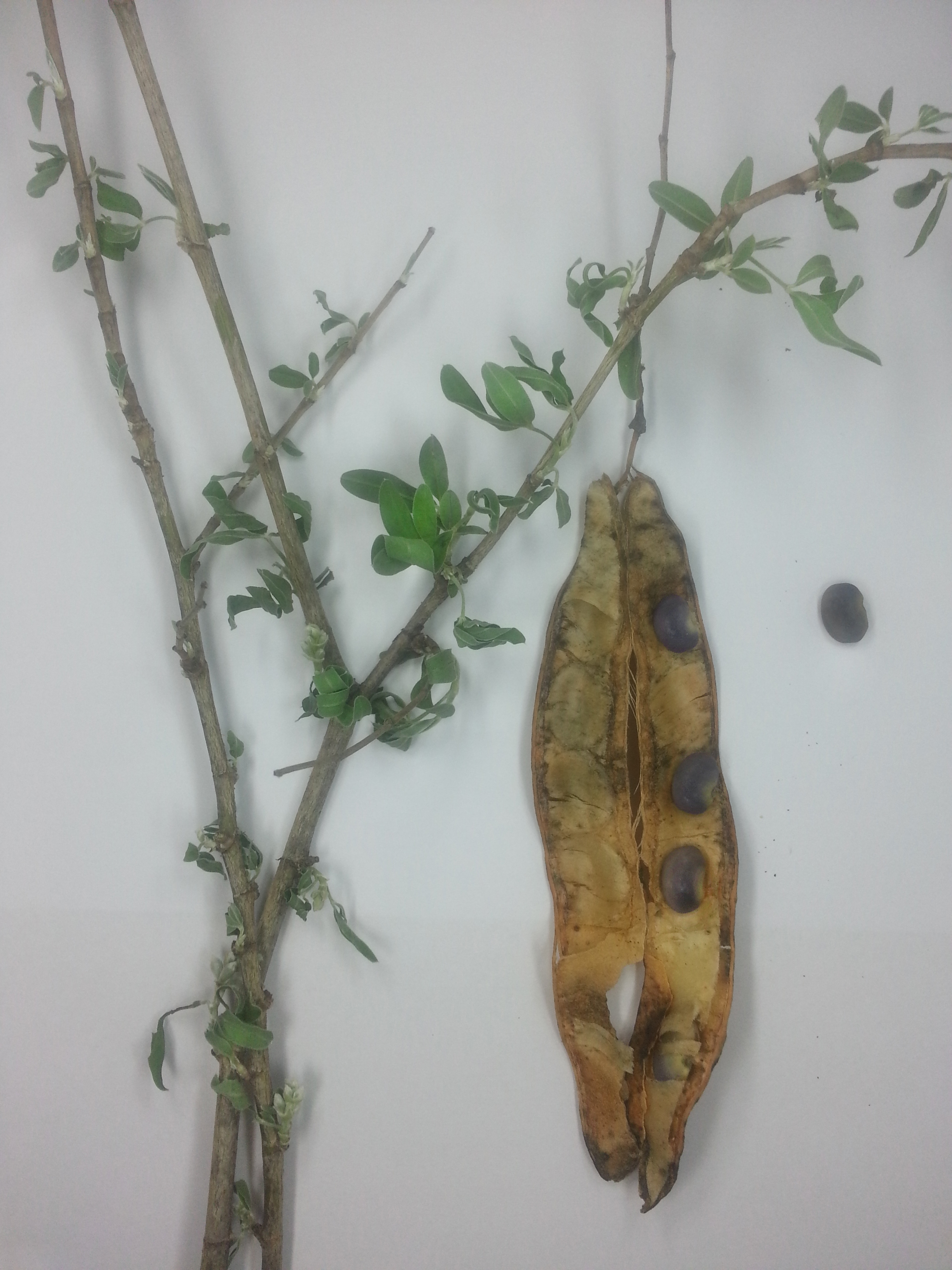
Twigs, showing ash-grey bark and single pod split open to reveal toxic, bean-like seeds

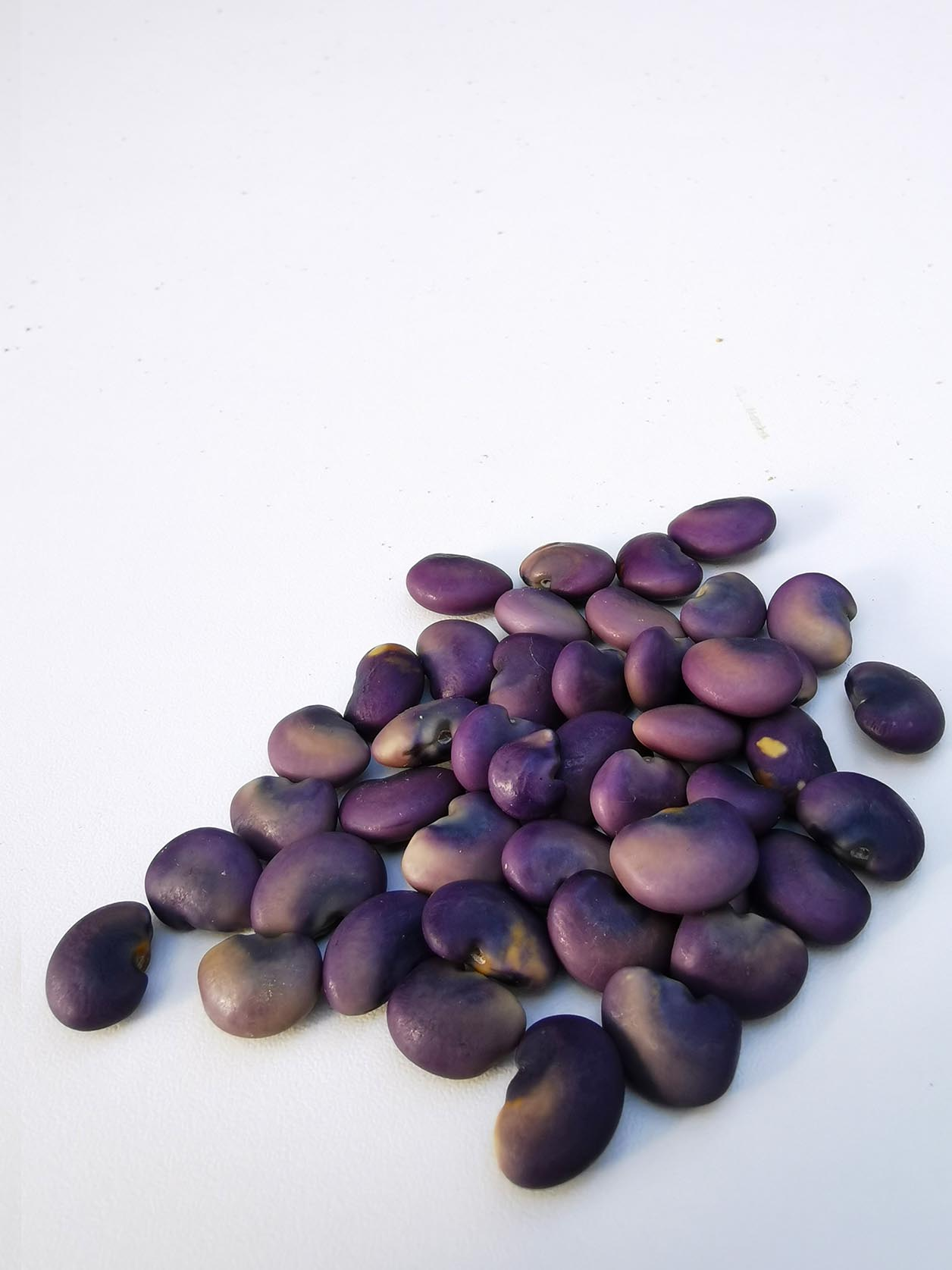
Highly toxic and emetic bean-like seeds, rich in the teratogenic alkaloid anagyrine (note superficial similarity to olive fruit)

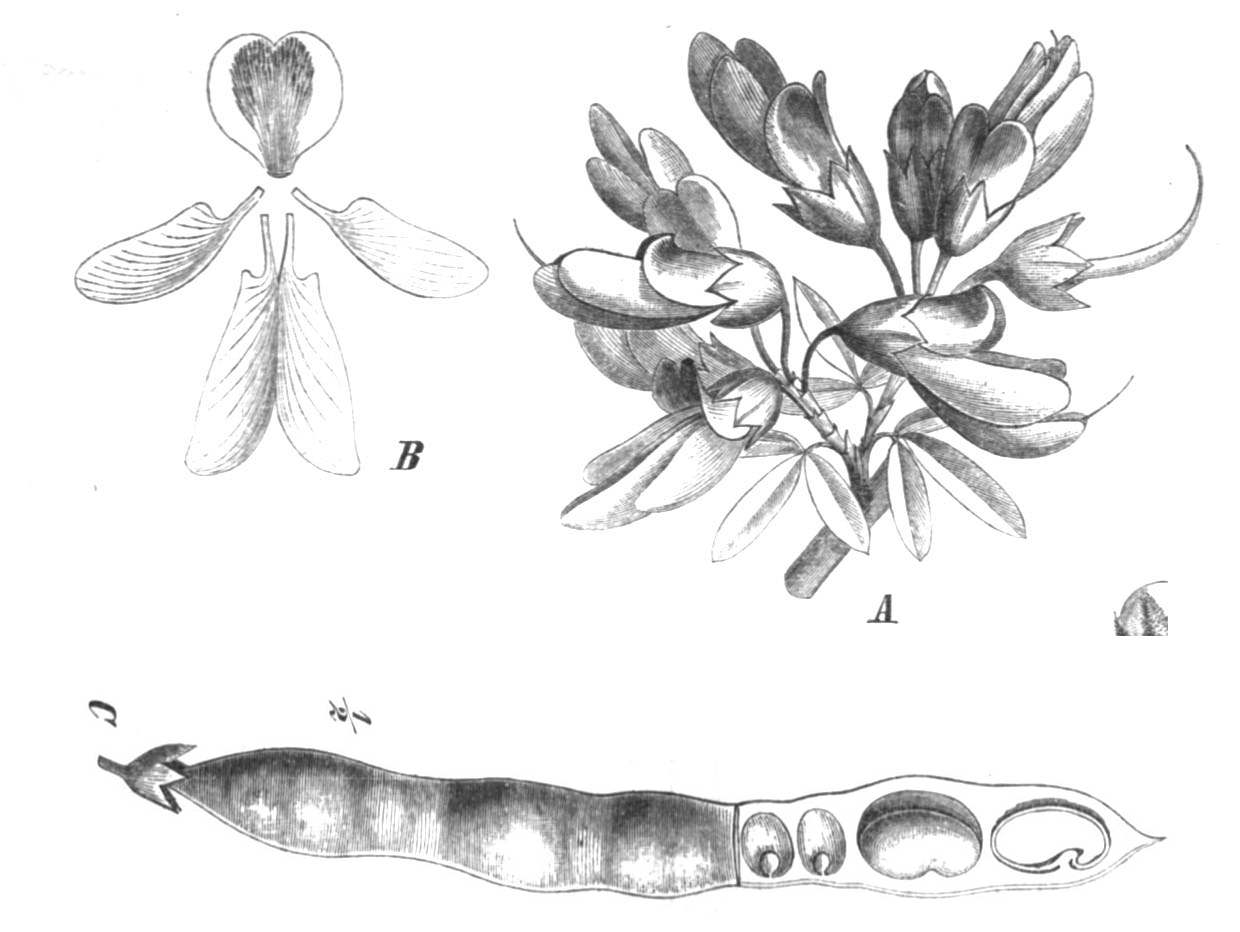
Engraving showing anatomical detail from the Natürliche Pflanzenfamilien of Paul Hermann Wilhelm Taubert (1891)

=== Avian pollinators ===
Generalist species whose short beaks increase the likelihood of transporting A. foetida pollen on their foreheads and throats

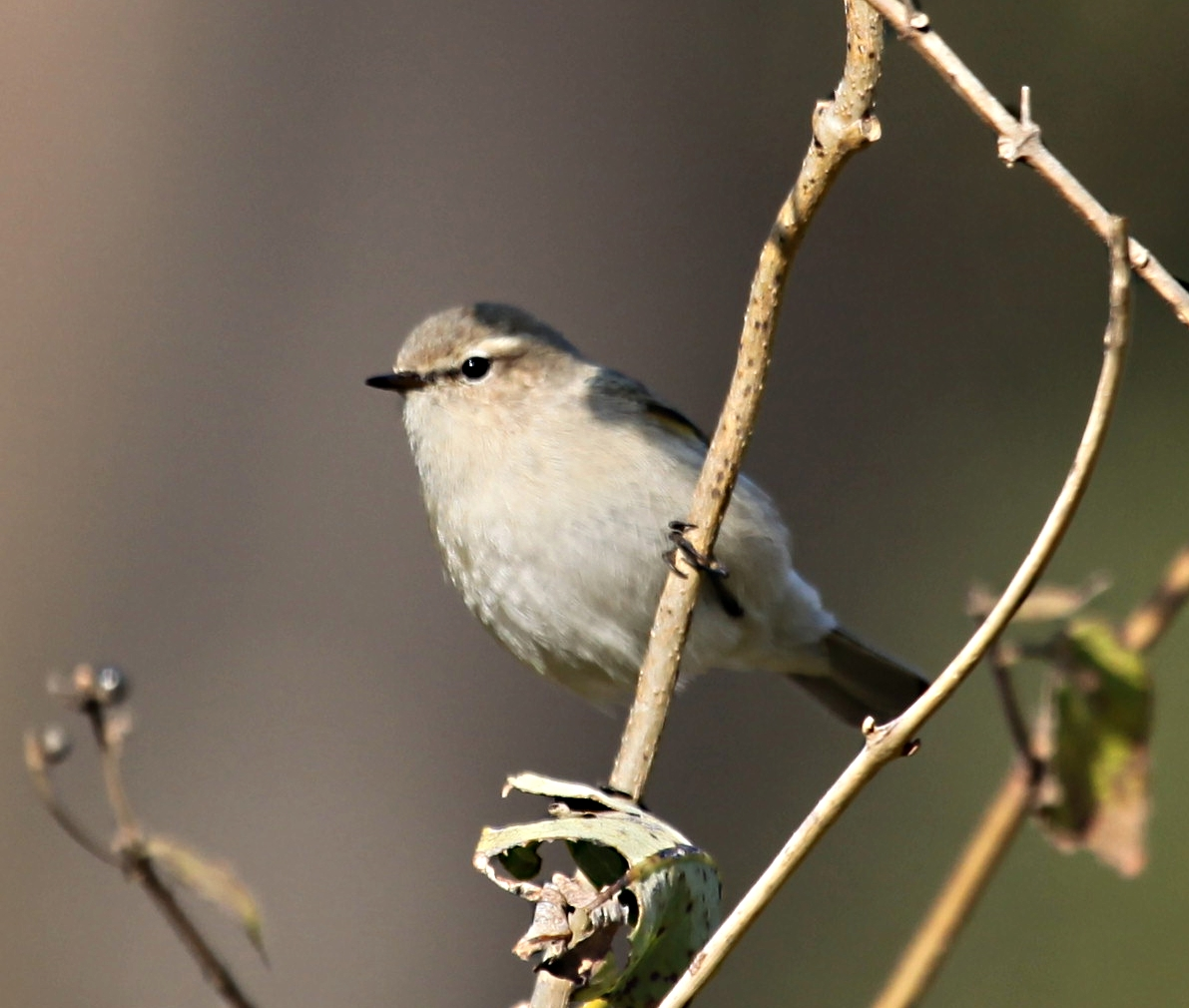
Common chiffchaff Phylloscopus collybita

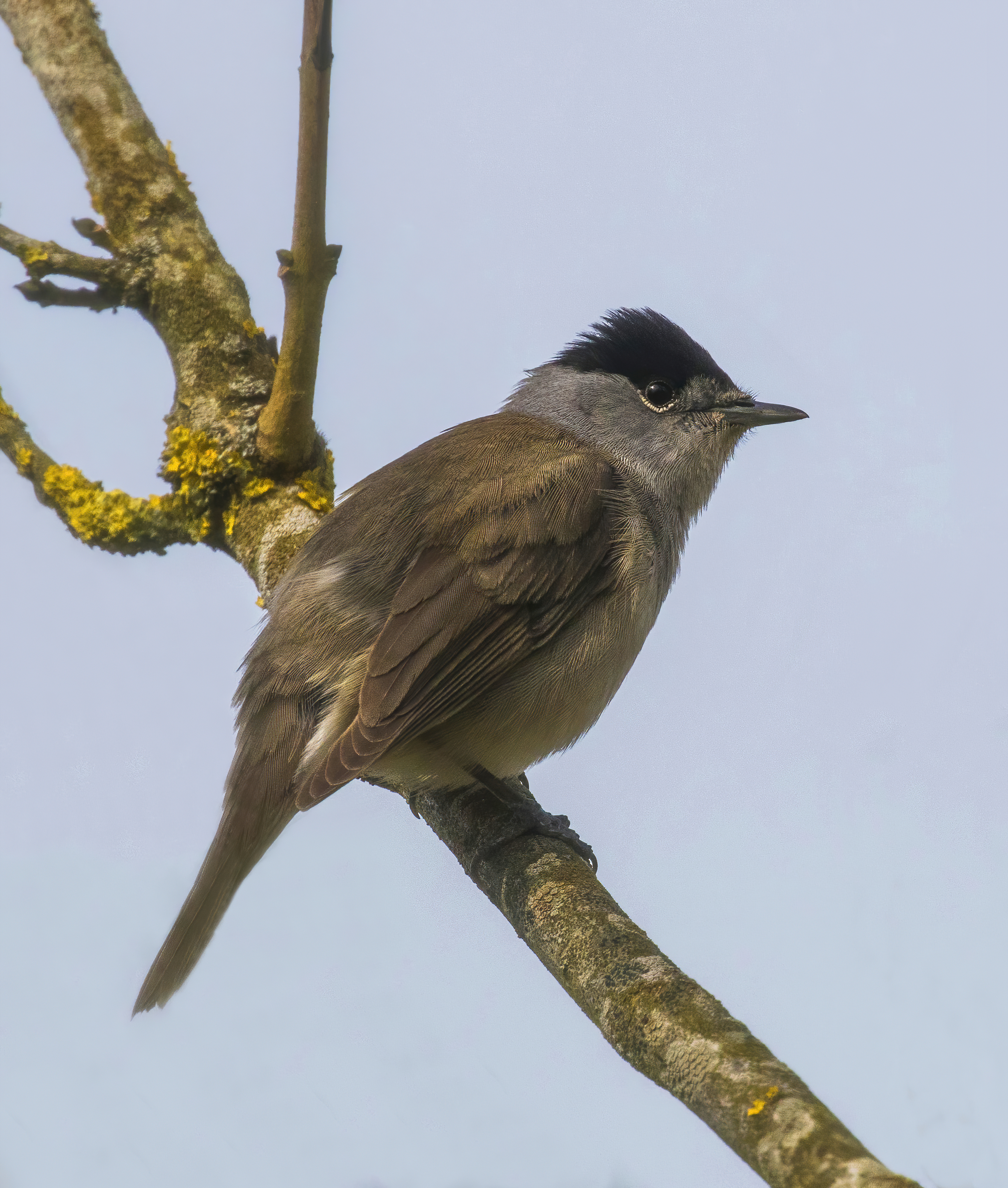
Eurasian blackcap Sylvia atricapilla

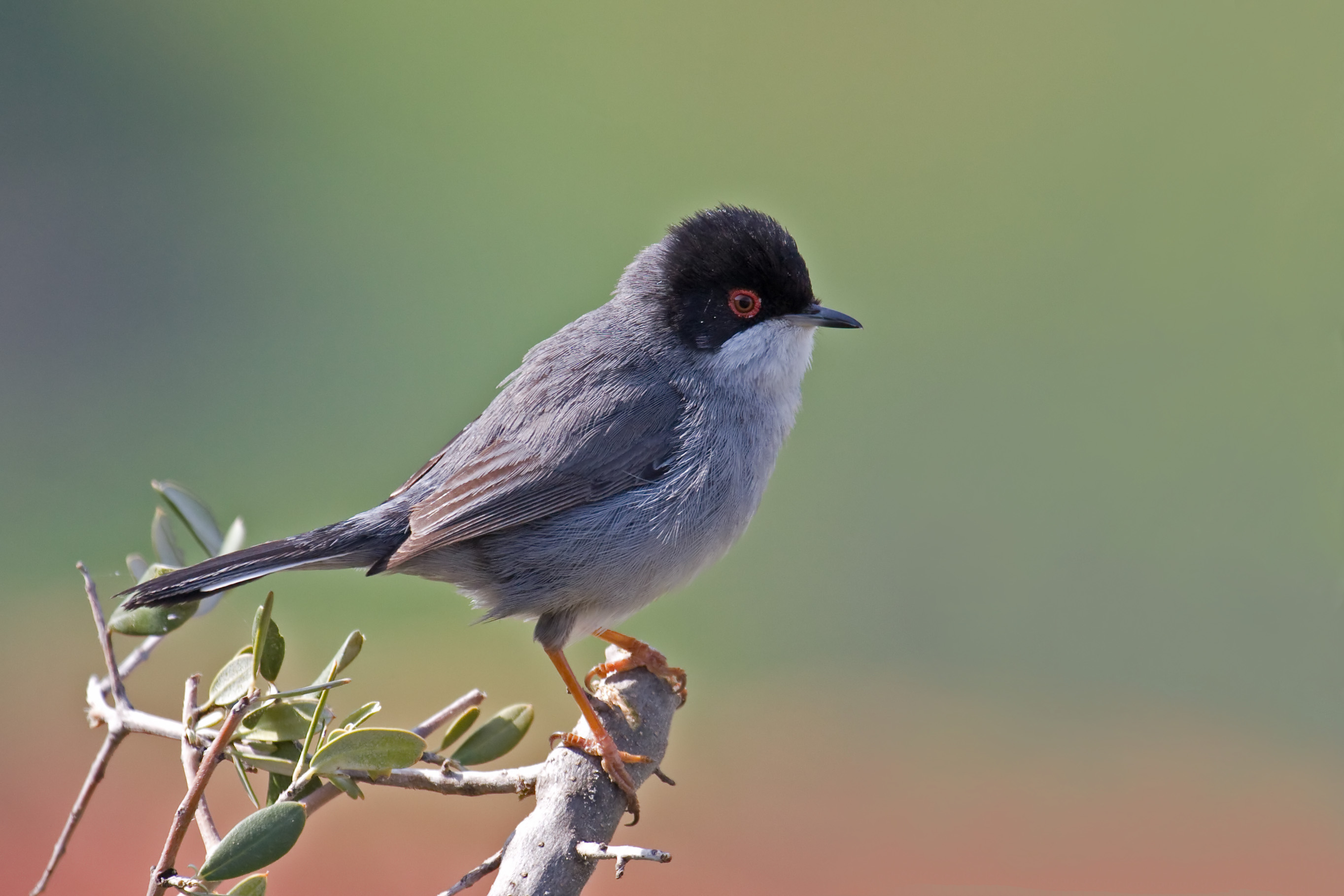
Sardinian warbler Curruca melanocephala

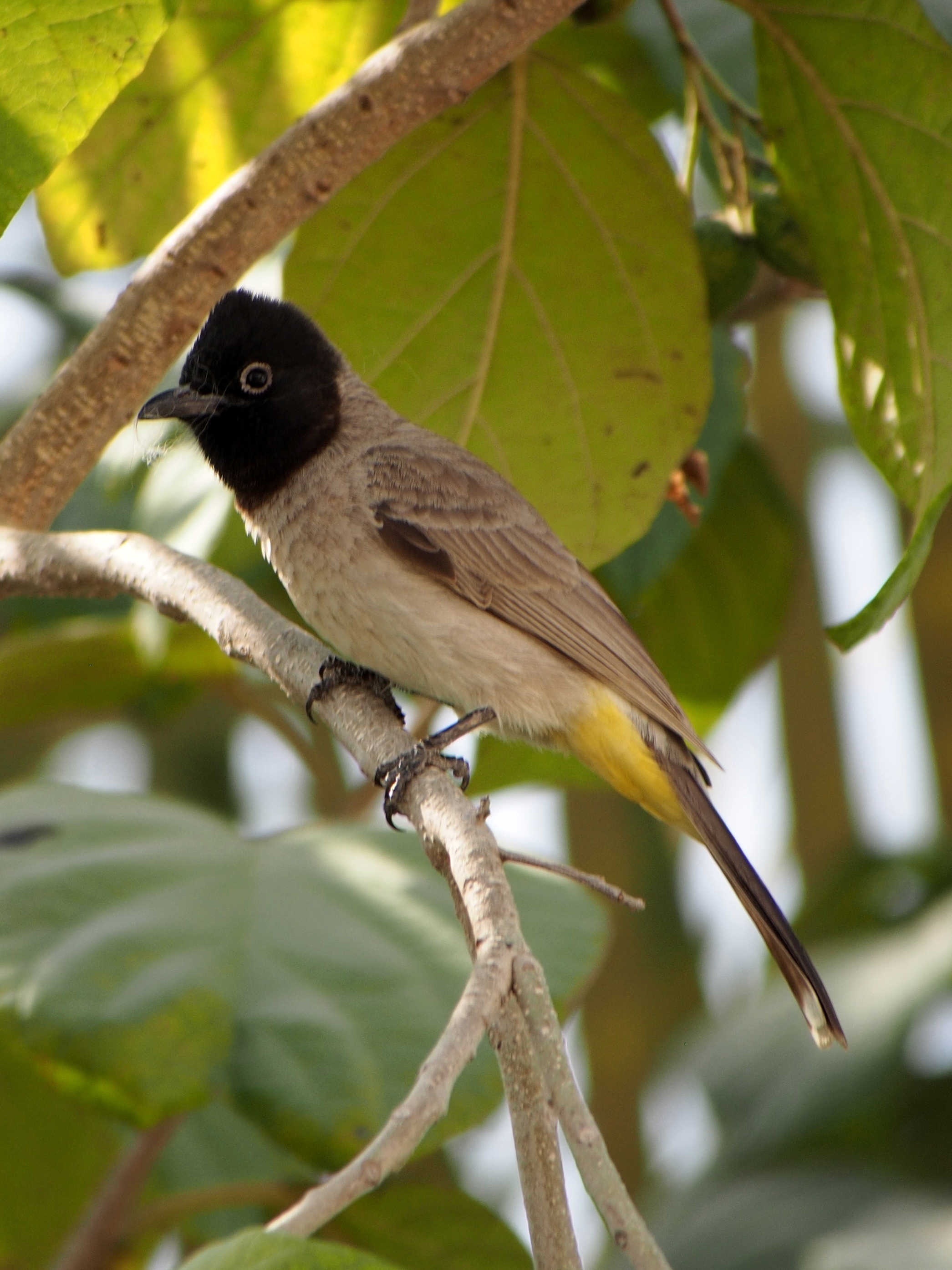
White-spectacled bulbul
Pycnonotus xanthopygos

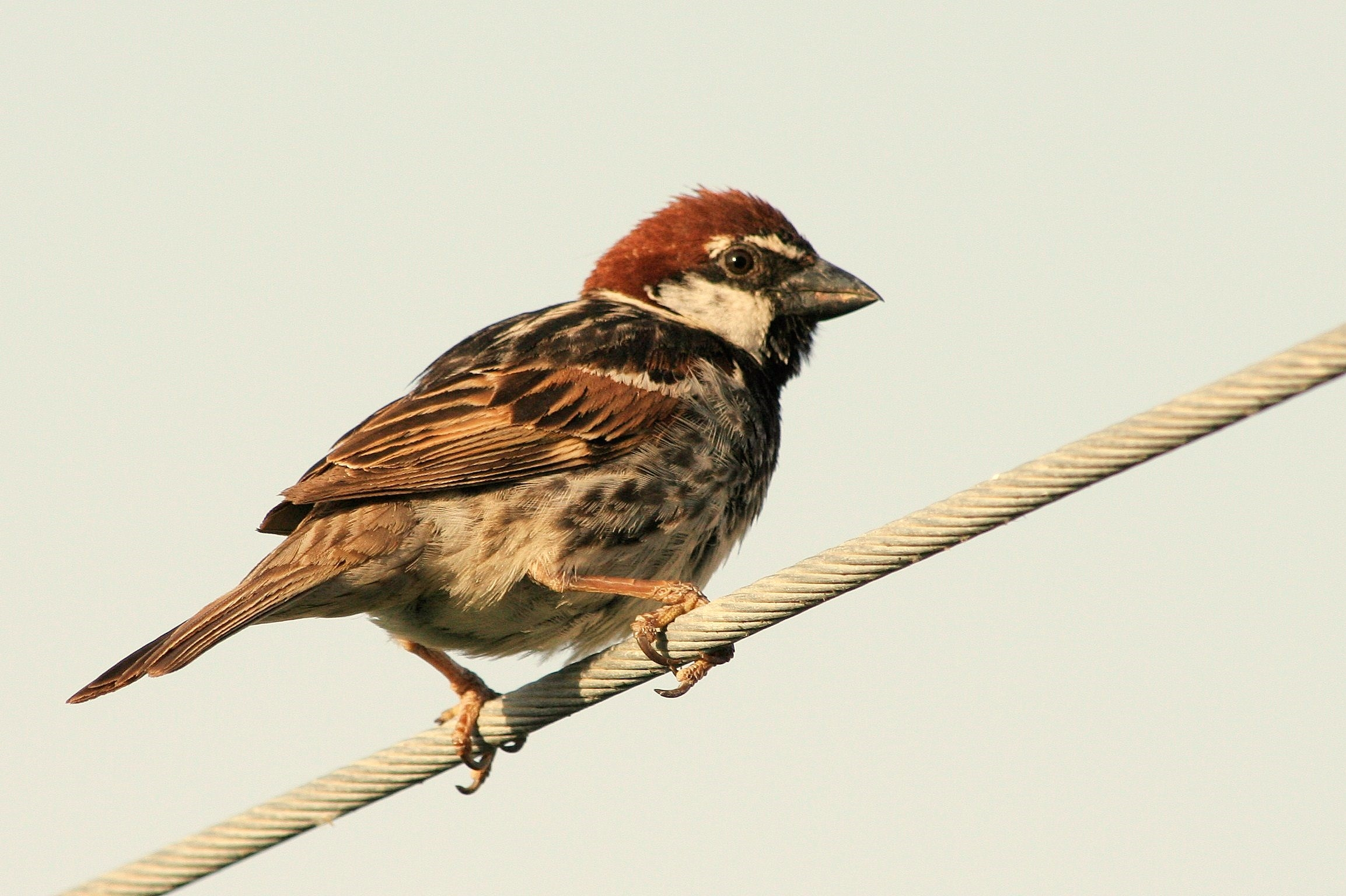
Spanish sparrow Passer hispaniolensis

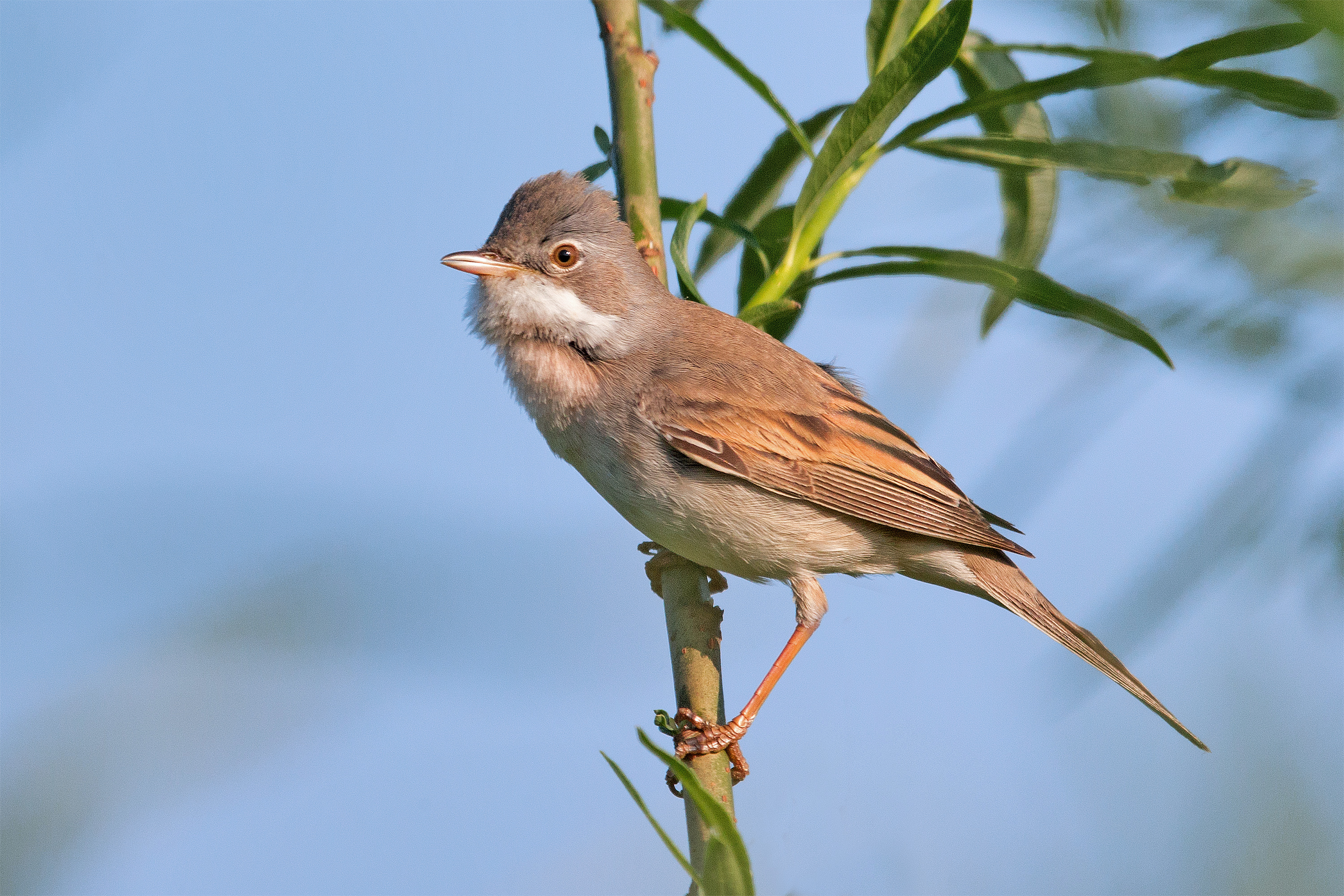
Common whitethroat
Curruca communis

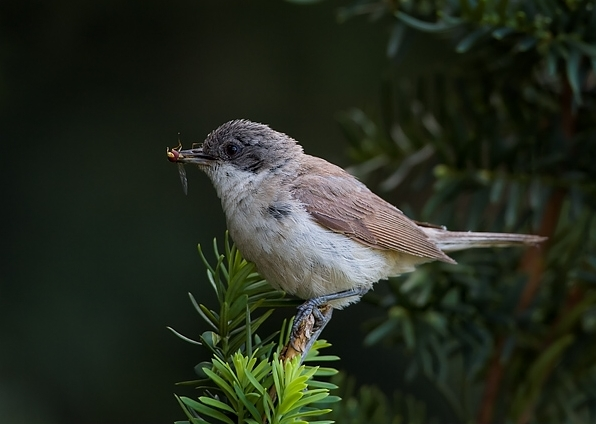
Lesser whitethroat Curruca curruca

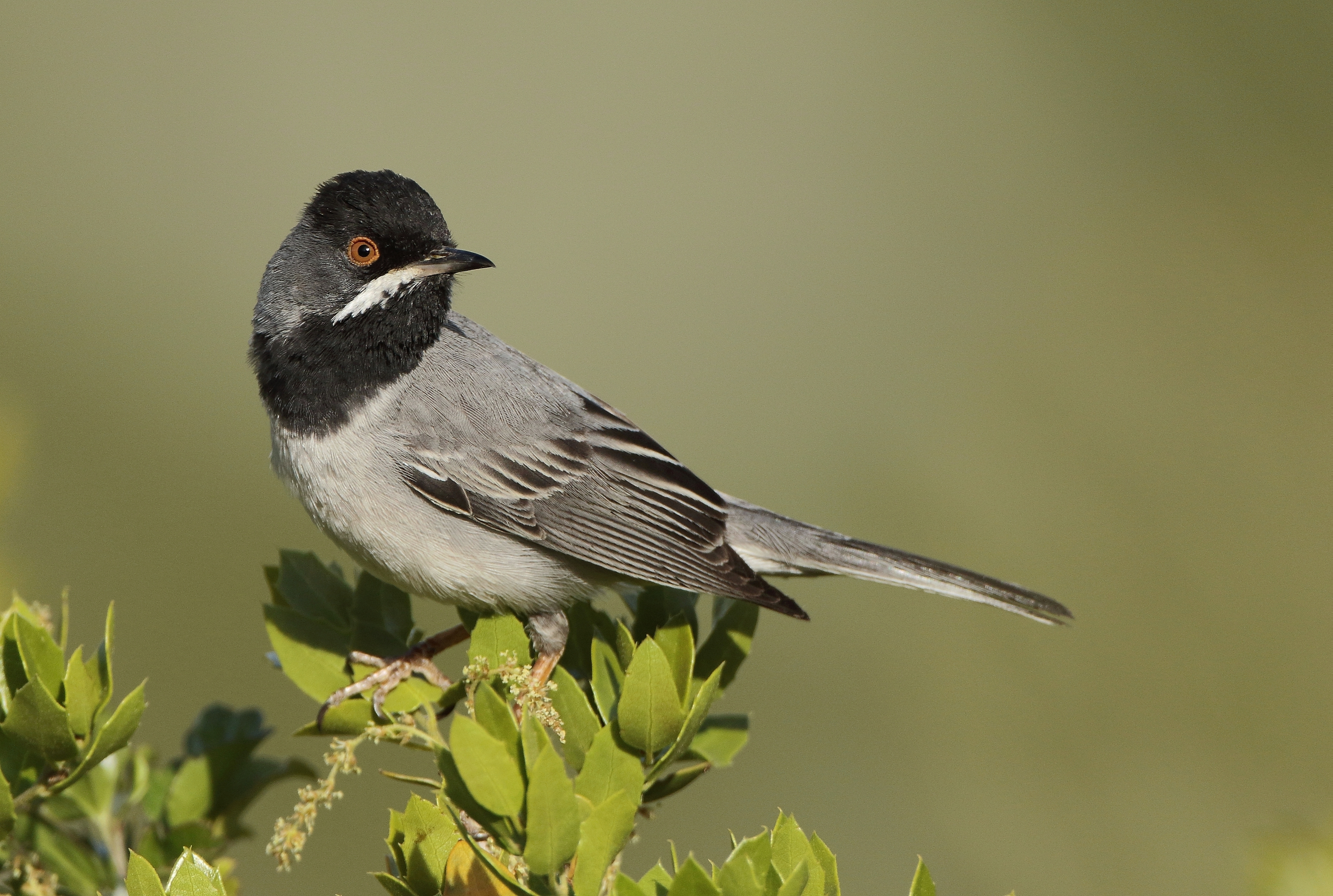
Rüppell's warbler Curruca ruppeli

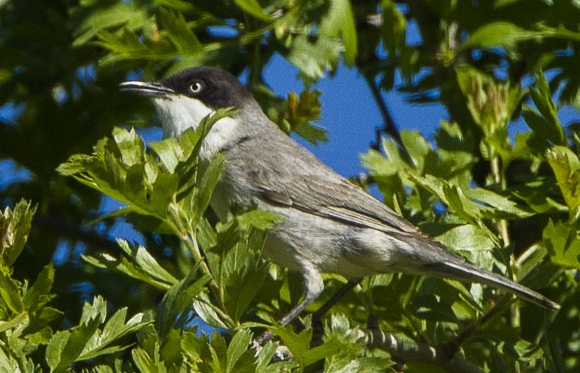
Eastern orphean warbler
Curruca crassirostris

=== Avian nectar thief ===
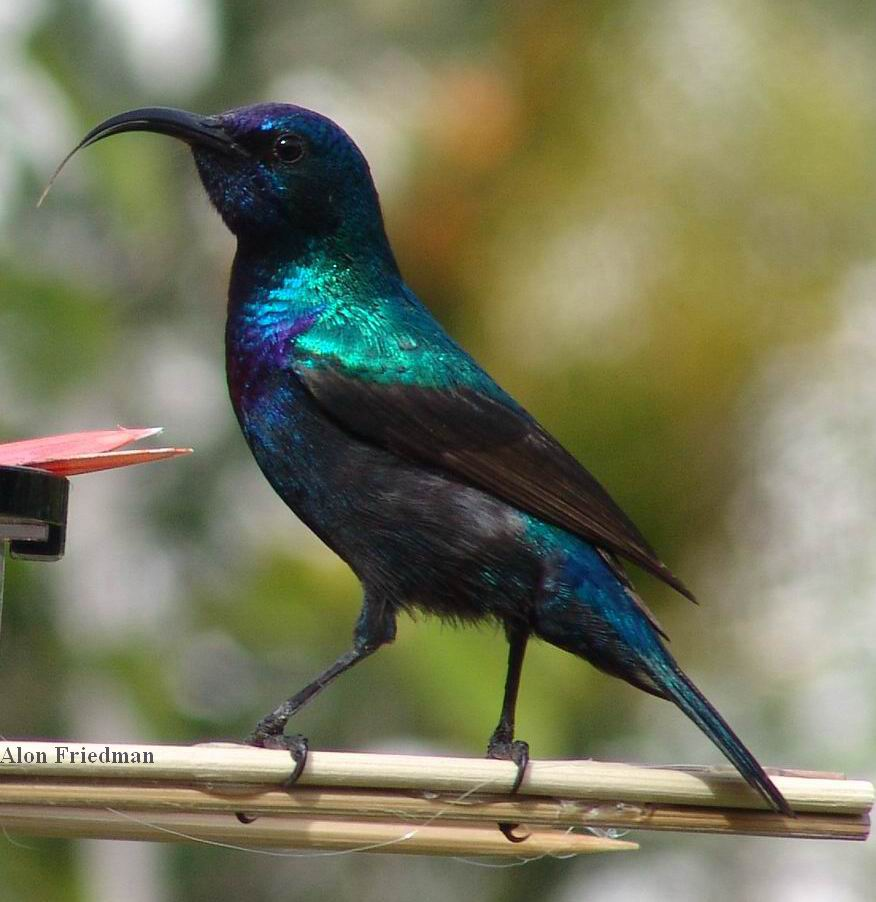
Palestine sunbird Cinnyris osea showing beak specially adapted for feeding on nectar

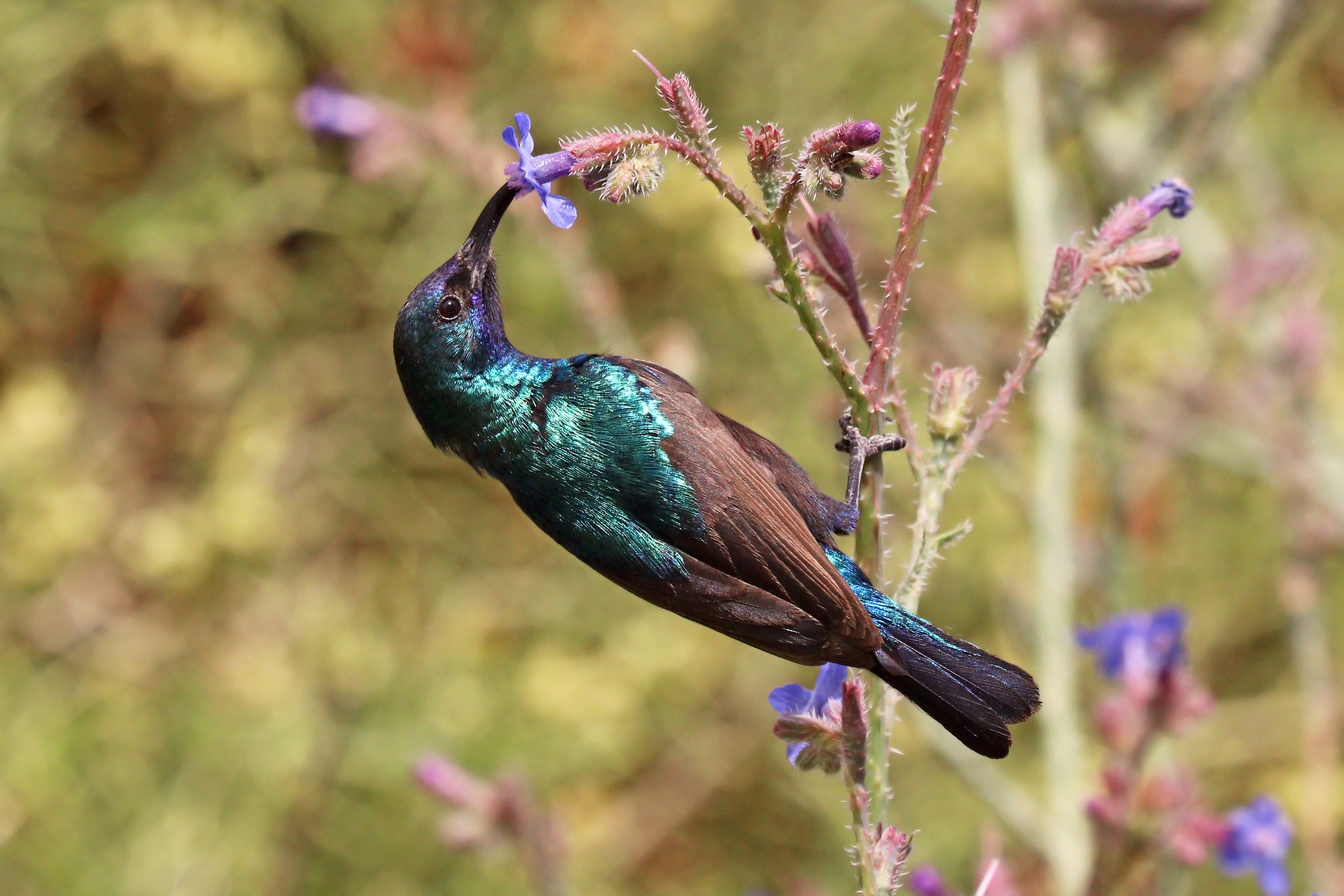
Palestine sunbird feeding

=== Insect pollinators ===
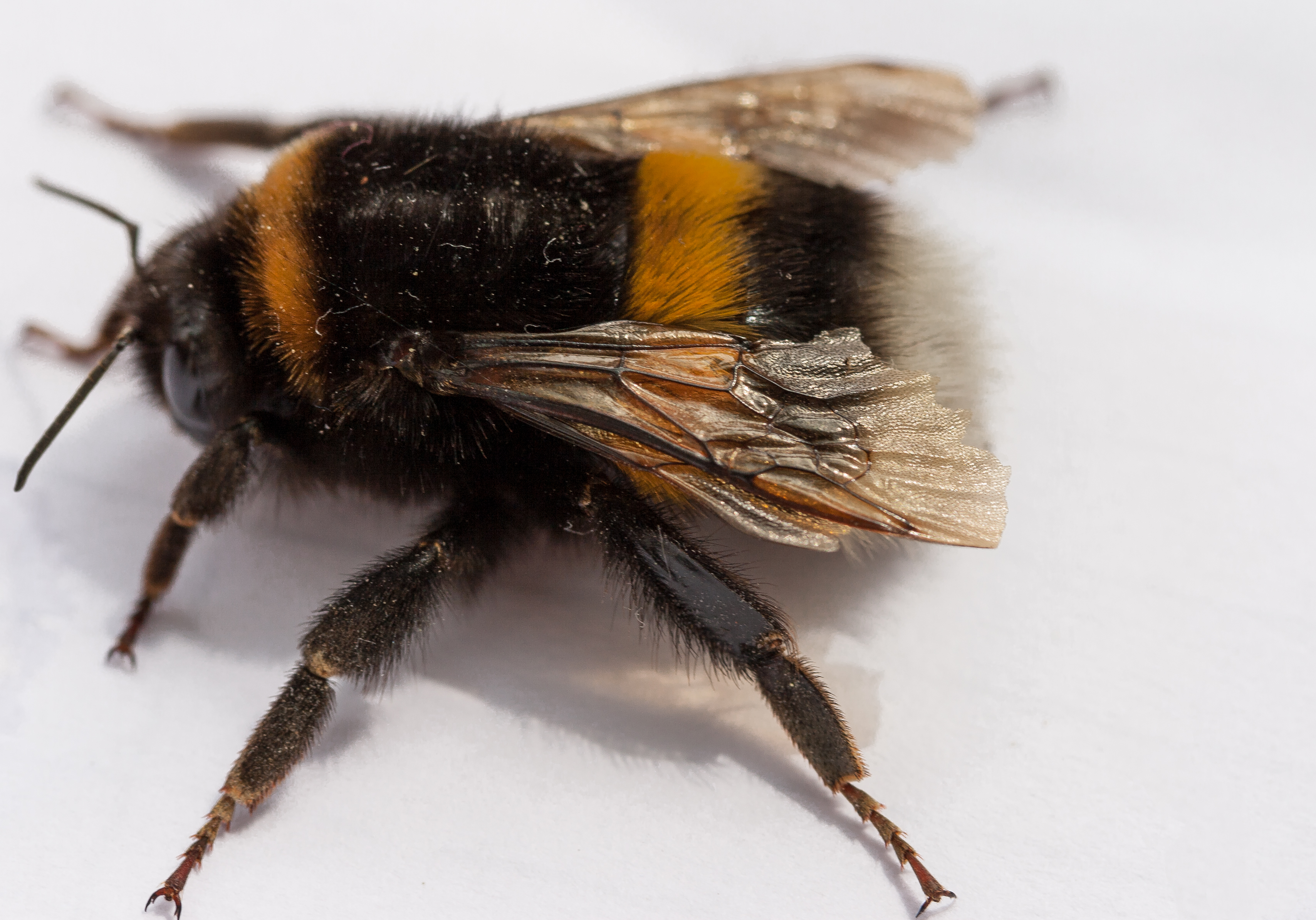
Buff-tailed bumblebee
Bombus terrestris

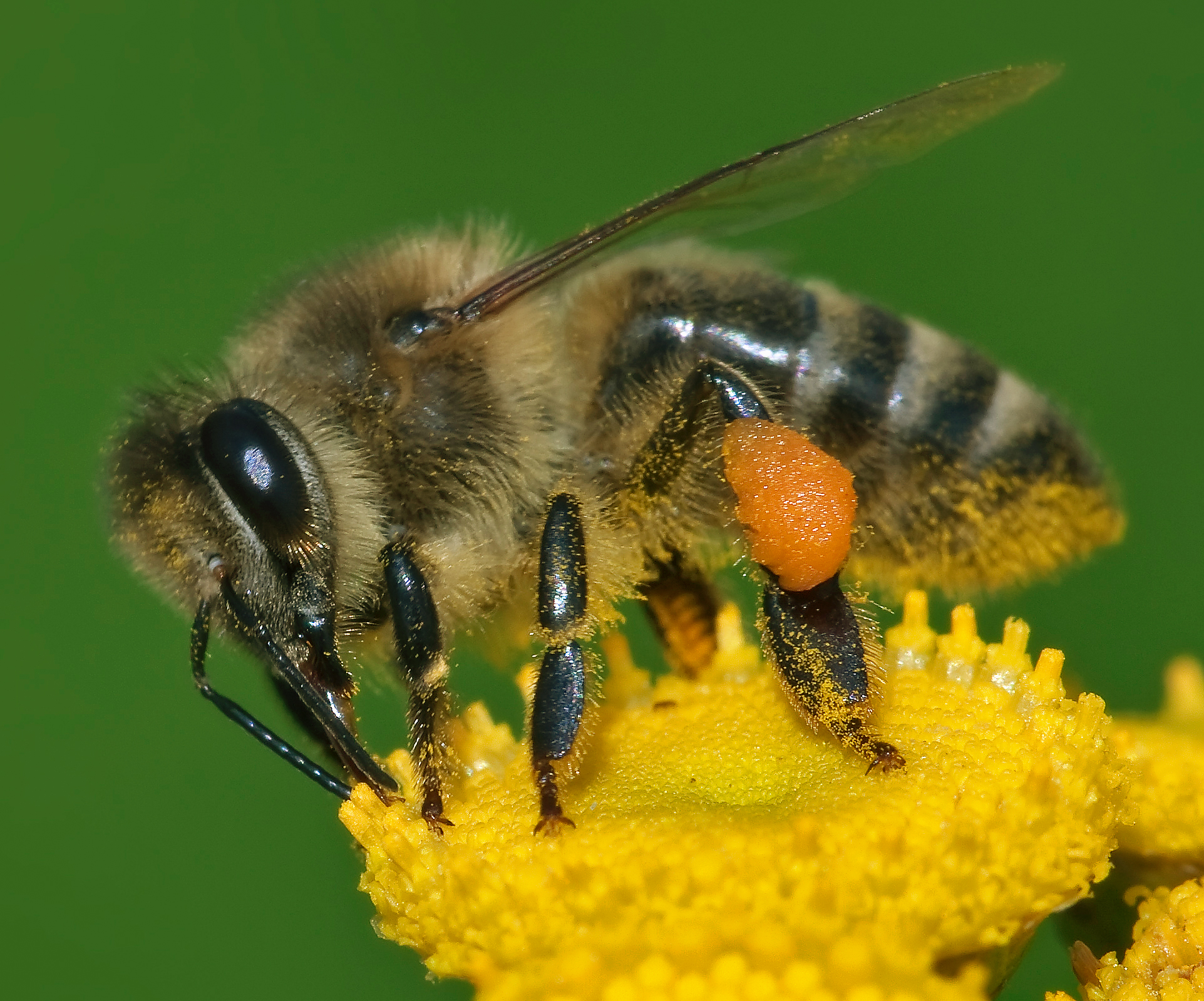
Western honey bee Apis mellifera

== See also ==
- Anagyrine
- Lupin bean
- Lupinus
- Laburnum
- Cytisus
- Thermopsis
- Vuralia
