= Anagyrous =

Coordinates: 37°49′48″N 23°47′51″E

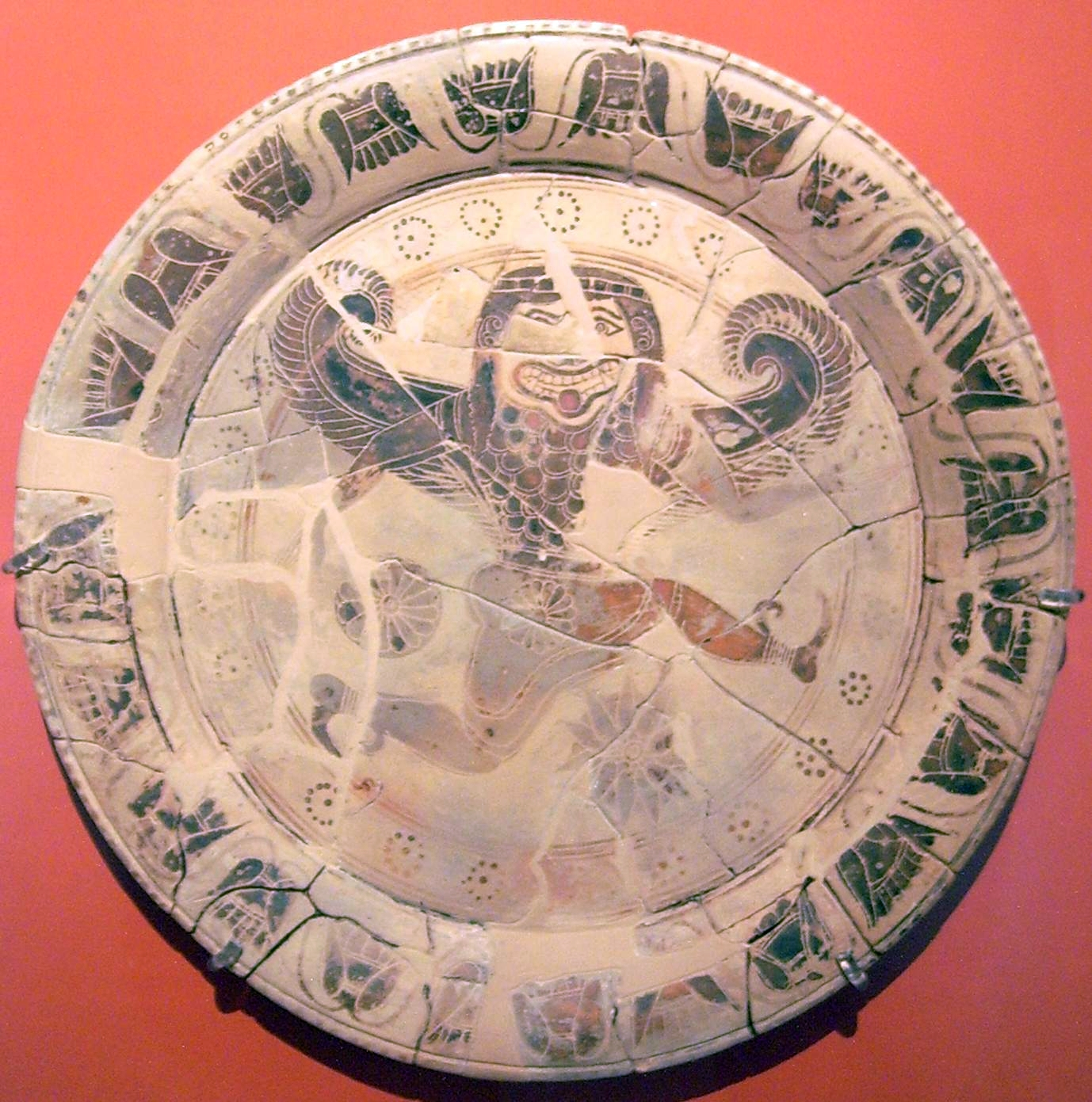
Plate with depiction of gorgons, c. 600–575 BC recovered at Anagyrous; National Museum, Attica.

Anagyrus or Anagyrous (Ancient Greek: Ἀναγυροῦς), also Anagyruntus or Anagyrountos (Ἀναγυροῦντος), was a deme of ancient Attica, belonging to the phyle Erechtheis, situated in the south of Attica near the promontory Zoster. Pausanias mentions at this place a temple of the mother of the gods.

The ruins of Anagyrus have been found near Vari.

The ancient name was maintained until 600 AD, as mentioned by geographer and historian Stephanus of Byzantium.

Anagyrous is an important archaeological site that still remains unexplored, with traces of human habitation dating back to 3rd millennium BCE, that include:

- The fortification and acropolis of Lathouriza (7th - 3rd century BC)
- The remains of 25 small houses
- A sacred altar
- Ten funerary precincts
- A major Mycenaean cemetery
- A cemetery and Palestrina of the Classical period
- The Cave of the Nymphs and Pan (converted to a sanctuary by Archedimus with statues of Cybele, Hermes, Pan and others)

Eumenes of Anagyrus and the Anagyrus Painter were from the town.

== Etymology ==
=== From name of hero Anagyros ===
According to one version, the name derives from the mythical Anagyros, whose temple was located in the region. Anagyros made the homes near his sacred grove tremble and collapse. He once exterminated an entire family who had cut trees from his sacred grove—hence the ancient proverb, "Anagryasion Daimon". Offerings and sacrifices were brought to Anagyros as attempts to appease his anger.

=== From plant name Anagyris ===
Another version derives from the plant Anagyris Anagyris foetida, the stinking bean trefoil , referred to as emetic and laxative by Dioscorides (9-79 AD) in his monumental De materia medica , and as an exorcism of ill fate by the Byzantine Suidas dictionary. The plant grows abundantly in the valley, exuding a terrible stench when touched or shaken. Aristophanes (Lysias 68) cites the following humorist dialogue:

Πόθεν εισίν; Αναγυρουντόθεν. Νη τον Δία, ο γουν Ανάγυρος μη κεκινήσθαι δοκεί.

(Pothen eisin? Anagyrountothen. Nee ton Dia, o goun Anagyros me kekinisthai dokei)

(Where are you from? From Anagyron, By Zeus, better not shake the Anagyron.)

In this context may also be mentioned a punning exchange near the beginning of Aristophanes's comedy Lysistrata:

[Several women enter, headed by MYRRHINA, from the deme of Anagyrous. Others soon follow.]

CALONICE: Hi ! but they're coming now : here they all are : First one, and then another - hoity-toity! Where’s this lot from?

LYSISTRATA: From Anagyrous.

CALONICE: Aha! Well, at any rate we’ve "stirred up Anagyrous" [homophonic pun upon the plant name "Anagyris"]. *

- Note: κινεῖν τὸν ἀνάγυρον (kinein tòn anáguron) "To stir up [shake] the Anagyris" (meaning the nauseous-smelling shrub Anagyris foetida) was a proverb, used of persons who brought some unpleasantness on themselves [compare "Let sleeping dogs lie"]. Calonice applies the proverb to the [similarly named] Anagyrous, meaning that the influx of Anagyrasian women proved that the deme Anagyrous was thoroughly stirred up [i.e. "in uproar" / "out on the street"].

A further layer of meaning can be guessed at in the pun: some commentators have inferred that a playful (possibly traditional) jibe at the inhabitants of Anagyrous may have been intended - to the effect that the Anagyrasians were notably smelly, because their personal hygiene was poor. [Aristophanes may here be referencing an in-joke that his Athenian audience would have appreciated].

== Association with infancy of Plato ==
According to Aelian, the countryside near Anagyrous was where Aristion and Periktyoni (Plato's parents) used to lull baby Plato.

"... εν ταις πλησίον μυρρίναις, δασείες ούσες και πυκνές, καθεύδοντι δε εσμός μελισσών εν τοις χείλεσι αυτού καθίσασαι, υπήδον την του Πλάτωνος ευγλωττία μαντευόμεναι."

(En tais plesion myrrinais, daseies ouses kai pyknes, katheudonti de esmos melisson en tois cheilesi autou kathisasai, upedon ten tou Platonos euglottia mantevomenai).

"... nearby the myrtle plants, dense and leafy as they were, and while he was sleeping, a swarm of bees sat peacefully on his lips, thus surmising the eloquence of Plato."
