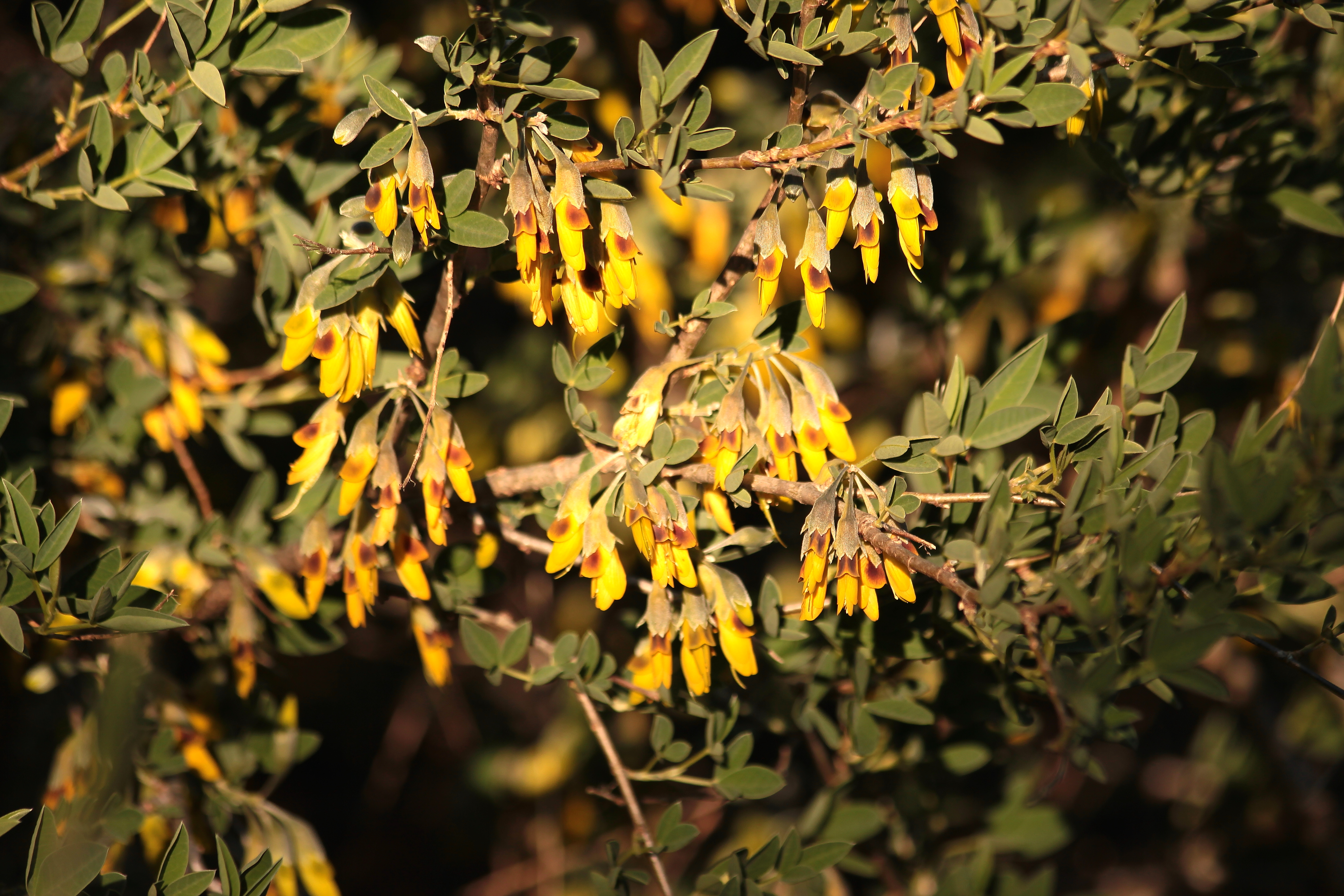
- Anagyris foetida

Scientific classification
- Kingdom: Plantae
- Clade: Tracheophytes
- Clade: Angiosperms
- Clade: Eudicots
- Clade: Rosids
- Order: Fabales
- Family: Fabaceae
- Subfamily: Faboideae
- Tribe: Sophoreae
- Genus: Anagyris; L.

Species
- 2–8; see text

= Anagyris =

Genus of plants

Anagyris (Spanish: oro de risco) is a genus of flowering plants in the family Fabaceae. It belongs to the subfamily Faboideae.

== Species ==
Anagyris comprises the following species:

- Anagyris foetida L.
- Anagyris latifolia Brouss. ex Willd. Almost extinct, this plant has trifoliate leaves and can be found in Gran Canaria.

== Species names with uncertain taxonomic status ==
The status of the following species is unresolved:

- Anagyris chinensis Spreng.
- Anagyris cretica Mill.
- Anagyris glauca Loudon
- Anagyris inodora Lour.
- Anagyris neapolitana Ten.
- Anagyris sinensis Steud.

== Gallery ==
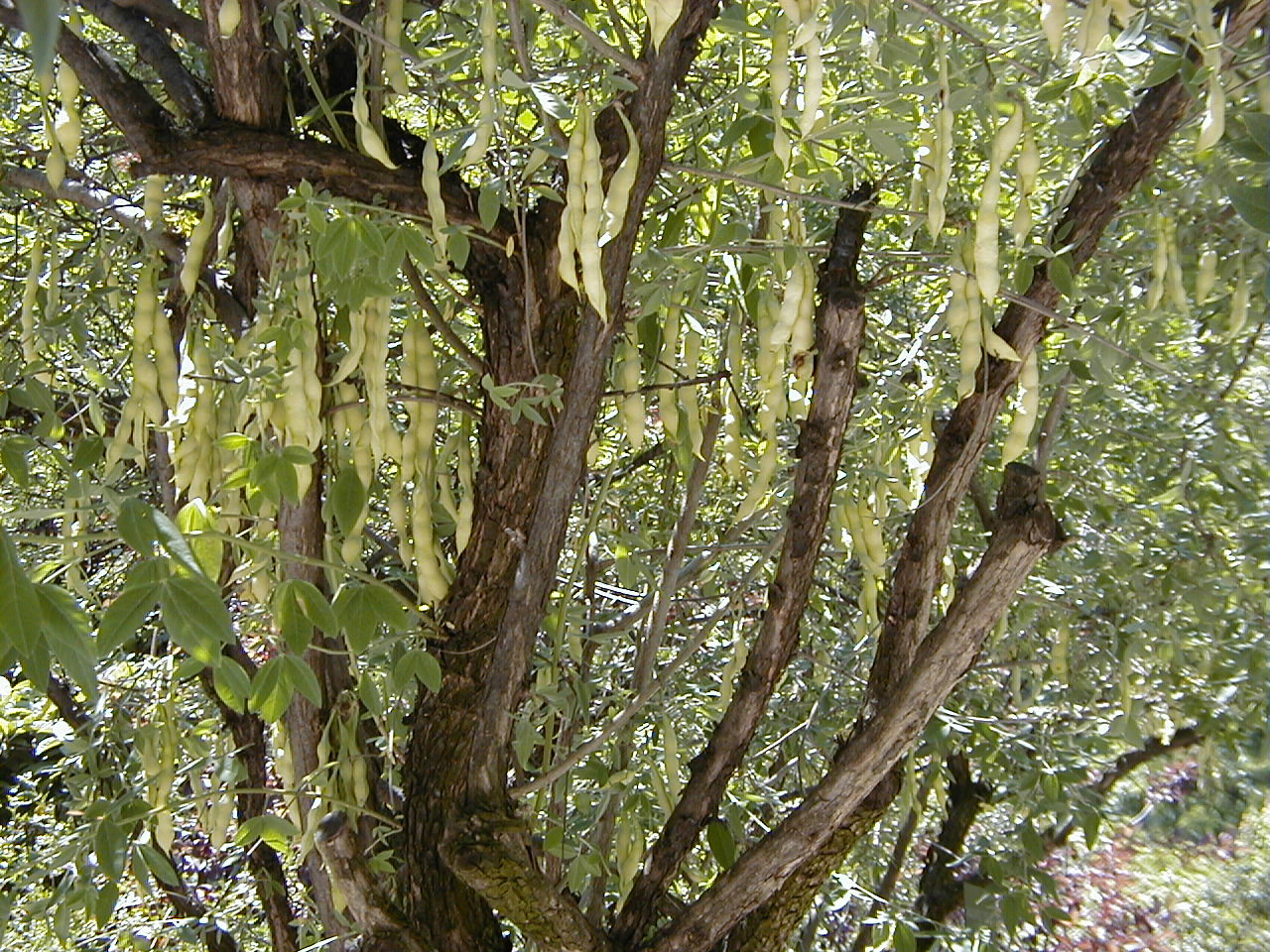
Canopy viewed from beneath, showing bark, foliage and ripening pods

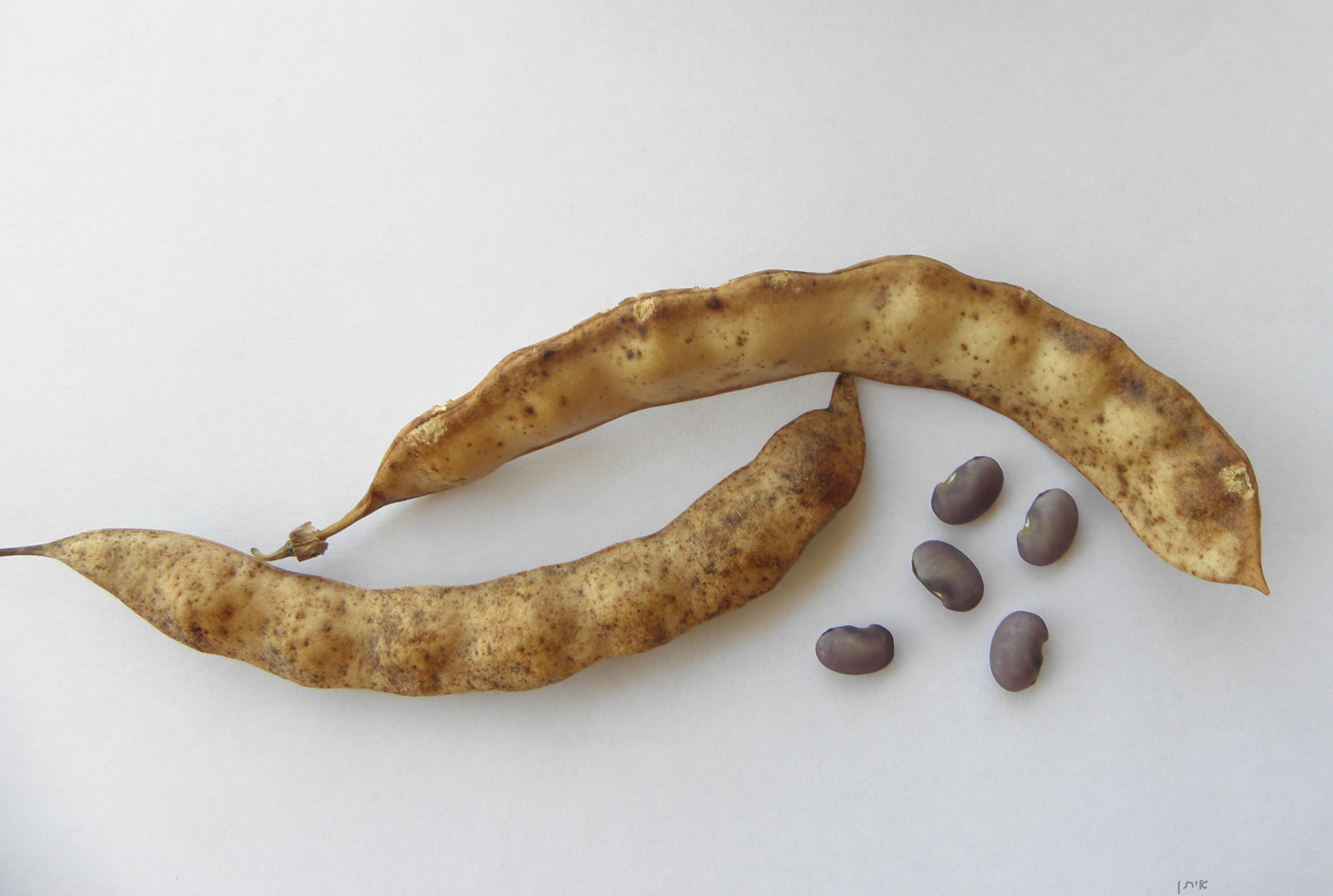
Ripe pods juxtaposed with ripe seeds

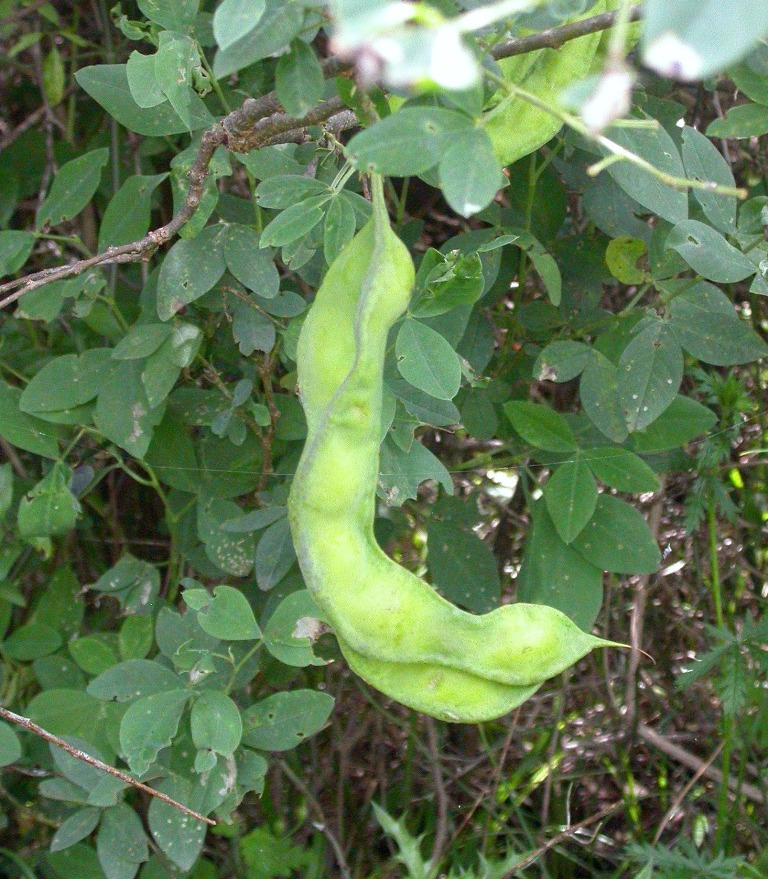
Single, unripe pod
