= Anagyrus Painter =

Ancient Greek vase-painter

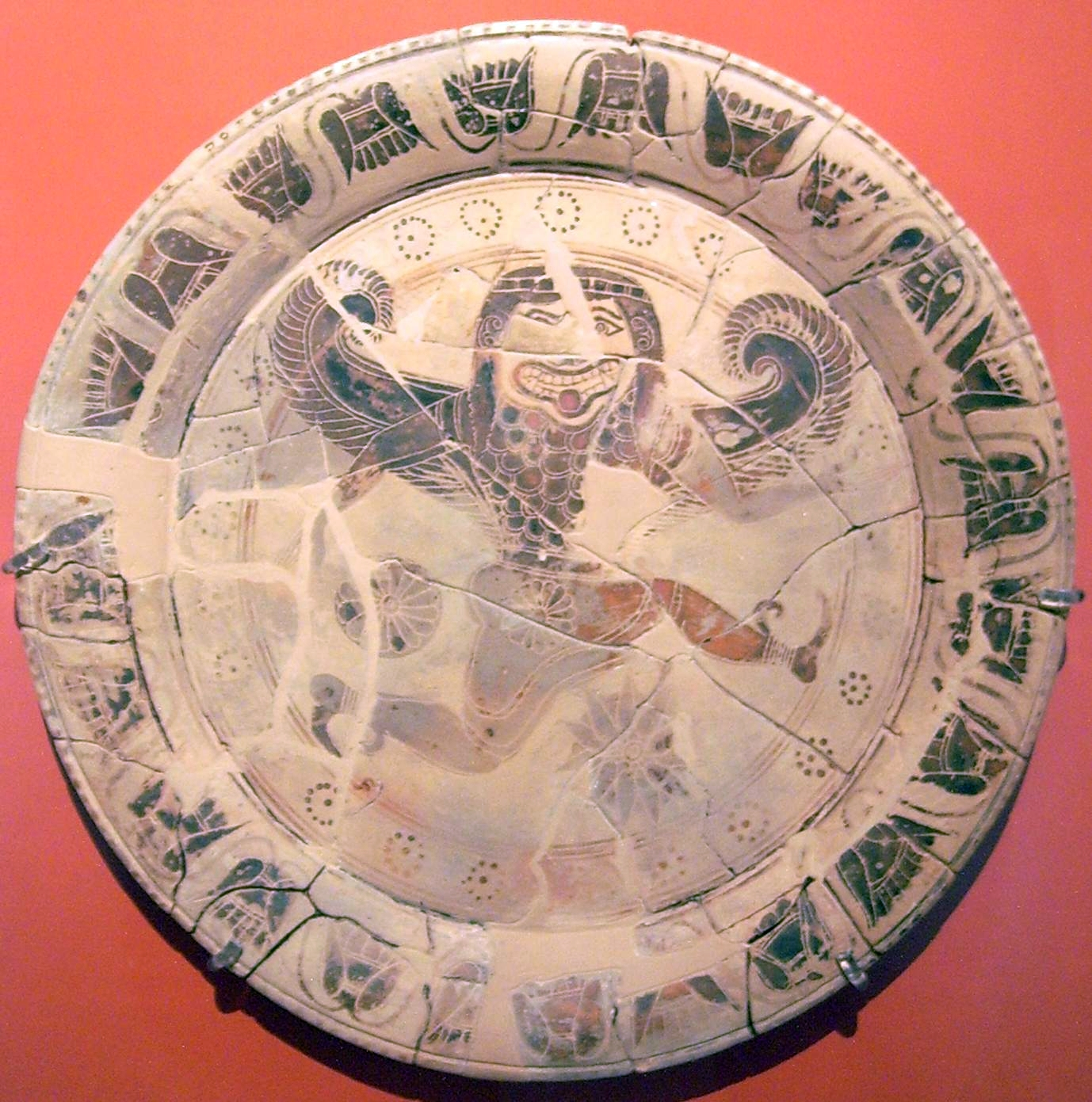
Plate with depiction of gorgons, c. 600–575 BC; National Museum, Athens.

The Anagyros Painter or Anagyrus Painter was a vase painter of the early Attic black-figure style, active in the first quarter of the 6th century BC. His works have only been found in inland Attica, mainly at Vari (ancient Anagyros, which is the base of his conventional name), but not in Athens itself. It is thus assumed that he was not active within the city and only produced for a very limited rural area. In contrast to many of his contemporaries, he did not paint lekanes but various large formats, such as amphorae, kantharoi, chalices, oinochoai and plates.

== Bibliography ==
- John Beazley: Attic Black-figure Vase-painters, Oxford 1956, p. 20-21.
- John D. Beazley: Paralipomena. Additions to Attic black-figure vase-painters and to Attic red-figure vase-painters, Oxford 1971, p. 13.
- John Boardman: Schwarzfigurige Vasen aus Athen. Ein Handbuch, von Zabern, Mainz 1977 (Kulturgeschichte der Antiken Welt, Vol 1) ISBN 3-8053-0233-9, p. 21.
- Gisela Ahlberg-Cornell: The Anagyrus Painter. The kantharos in Athens NM 19174 and some stylistic problems in early Attic Black-Figure, in: Archeologia Classica 33 (1981) p. 93-121.
