= Zoster (Attica) =

Cape in Attica, Greece

Coordinates: 37°48′11″N 23°46′16″E

Location map

Cape Zoster (Greek: Άκρα Ζωστήρ, romanized: Akra Zoster; Latin: Zoster promontorium) is a cape in Attica, Greece, on which was situated the Temple of Apollo Zoster. It is on the Saronic Gulf, and in ancient times was between Aexone and Anagyrous. The name comes from Greek mythology, the tale as related by Pausanias was that in this location Leto, who was pregnant by Zeus, loosened her gilt belt, or zoster, as she was being chased by an angry Hera. Leto believed that she was about to give birth to the twins Apollo and Artemis.

== See also ==
- Zone (vestment)
