= Diphilus =

Ancient Greek poet

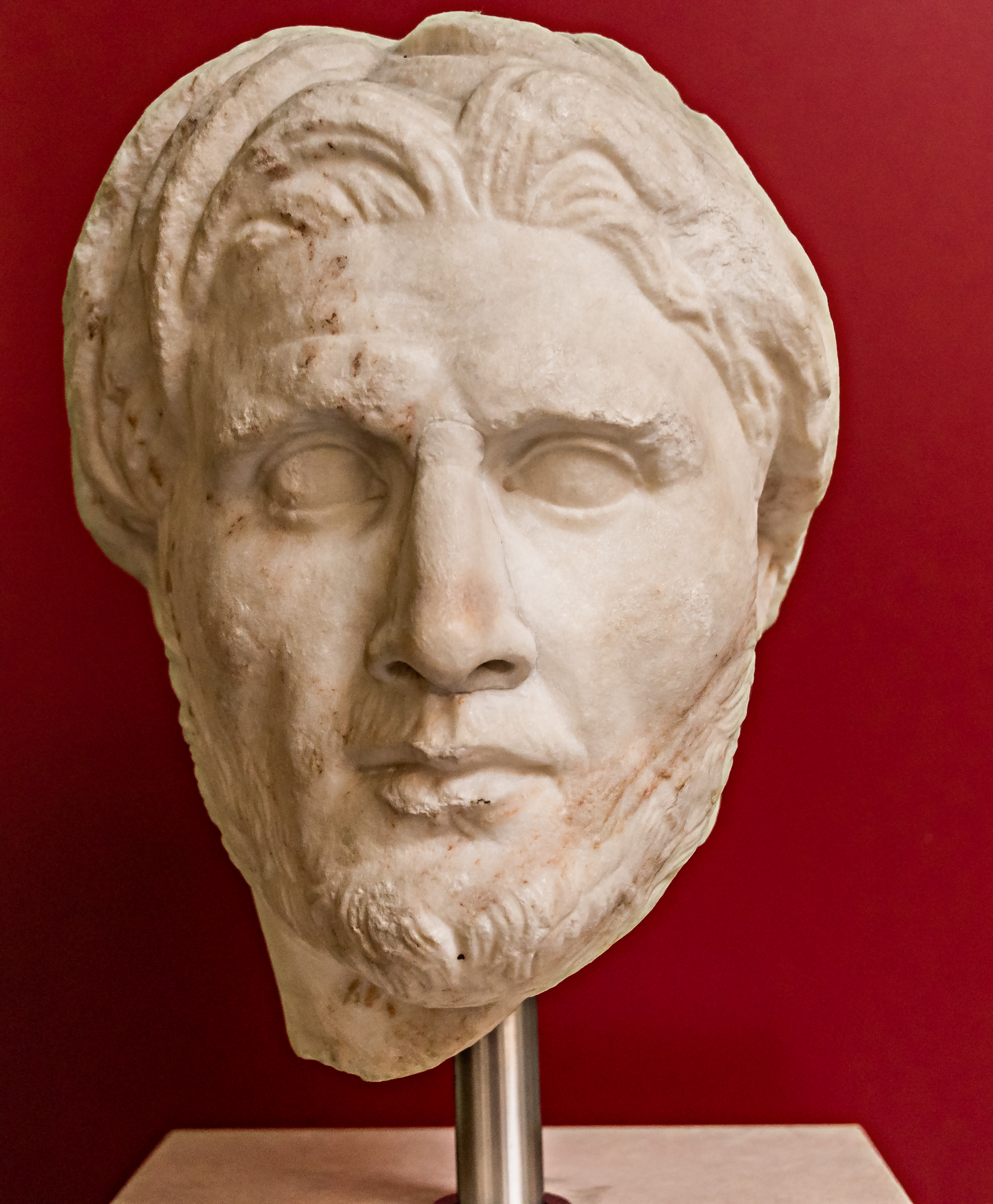
Portrait of the poet Diphilus, a Roman copy from the early 1st century

Diphilus (Greek: Δίφιλος), of Sinope, was a poet of the new Attic comedy and a contemporary of Menander (342–291 BC). He is frequently listed together with Menander and Philemon, considered the three greatest poets of New Comedy. He was victorious at least three times at the Lenaia, placing him third before Philemon and Menander. Although most of his plays were written and acted in Athens, he died in Smyrna. His body was returned and buried in Athens.

According to Athenaeus, he was on intimate terms with the famous courtesan Gnathaena. Athenaeus quotes the comic poet Machon in support of this claim. Machon is also the source for the claim that Diphilus acted in his own plays.

An anonymous essay on comedy from antiquity reports that Diphilus wrote 100 plays. Of these 100 plays, 59 titles, and 137 fragments (or quotations) survive. From the extant fragments, Diphilus's plays seem to have featured many of the stock characters now primarily associated with the comedies of the Roman playwright Plautus, who translated and adapted a number of Diphilus's plays. Swaggering soldiers, verbose cooks, courtesans, and parasites, all feature in the fragments. In contrast to his more successful contemporaries, Menander and Philemon, Diphilus seems to have had a preference for the mythological subjects so popular in Middle Comedy.

To judge from the imitations of Plautus (Casina from the Κληρούμενοι, Asinaria from the Ὀναγός, Rudens from some other play), he was very skillful in the construction of his plots. Terence also tells us that he introduced into the Adelphi (ii. I) a scene from the Συναποθνήσκοντες, which had been omitted by Plautus in his adaptation (Commorientes) of the same play.

According to the Encyclopædia Britannica Eleventh Edition:

The style of Diphilus was simple and natural, and his language on the whole good Attic; he paid great attention to versification, and was supposed to have invented a peculiar kind of metre. The ancients were undecided whether to class him among the writers of the New or Middle comedy. In his fondness for mythological subjects (Hercules, Theseus) and his introduction on the stage (by a bold anachronism) of the poets Archilochus and Hipponax as rivals of Sappho, he approximates to the spirit of the latter.

== Surviving titles and fragments ==
- Adelphoi ("Brothers")
- Agnoia ("Ignorance," possibly written by Calliades)
- Airesiteiches
- Aleiptria ("The Female Oiler," or "Masseuse")
- Amastris ("Amastris"), or Athenaeus
- Anagyros ("Anagyrus")
- Anasozomenoi ("The Rescued Men")
- Aplestos ("Insatiable")
- Apobates ("The Trick-Rider")
- Apolipousa ("The Woman Who Leaves")
- Balaneion ("The Bath-house")
- Boiotios ("The Man From Boeotia")
- Chrysochoos ("The Goldsmith")
- Gamos ("Marriage")
- Danaides ("The Daughters of Danaus")
- Diamartanousa ("The Woman Who Is Failing Utterly")
- Elaion ("The Olive-Grove") or Phrourountes ("The Watchers")
- Emporos ("The Merchant")
- Enagismata ("Offerings to the Dead")
- Enkalountes ("The Accusers")
- Epidikazomenos ("The Claimant")
- Epikleros ("The Heiress")
- Epitrope, or Epitropeus
- Hecate ("Hecate")
- Helenephorountes
- Helleborizomenoi ("People Taking Hellebore")
- Herakles ("Hercules")
- Heros ("The Hero")
- Kitharodos ("The Citharode")
- Kleroumenoi ("Those Casting Lots")
- Lemniai ("Women from Lemnos")
- Mainomenos ("The Madman")
- Mnemation ("The Little Tomb," or "The Monument")
- Onagros ("The Wild Donkey")
- Paiderastai ("The Pederasts")
- Pallake ("The Concubine")
- Parasitos ("The Parasite")
- Peliades ("Daughters of Pelias")
- Philadelphos ("The Brother-Loving Man")
- Phrear ("The Well")
- Pithraustes (possibly Tithraustes)
- Plinthophoros ("The Brick-Carrier")
- Polypragmon ("The Busybody")
- Pyrrha ("The Red-Haired Woman," or "Pyrrha")
- Sappho ("Sappho")
- Sikelikos ("The Sicilian Man," possibly belongs to Philemon)
- Schedia ("The Raft")
- Synapothneskontes ("Men Dying Together")
- Syntrophroi
- Synoris
- Telesias
- Thesaurus ("The Treasure")
- Theseus
- Zographos ("The Painter")

Fragments in R. Kassel-C. Austin, "Poetae Comici Graeci" (PCG) vol. 5 (previously in T. Kock, Comicorum Atticorum fragmenta ii; see J. Denis, La Comédie grecque (1886), ii. p. 414; R. W. Bond in "Classical Review" 24(1) (February 1910) with trans. of Emporos fragm.).
