= Stephane (headdress) =

Decorative headband

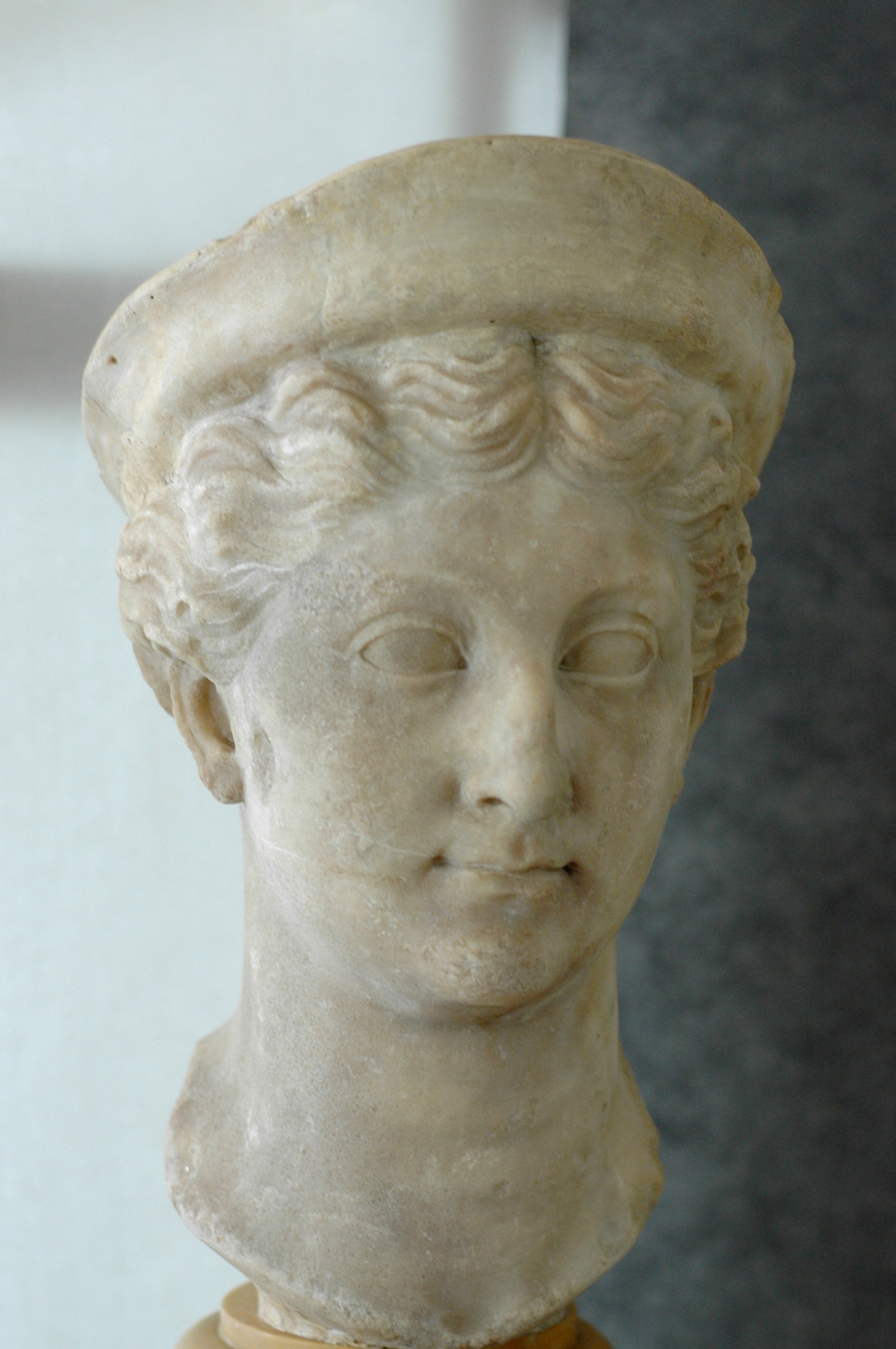
Bust of an empress, possibly Vibia Sabina, wearing a stephane, c. AD 134–147

A stephane (ancient Greek στέφανος, from στέφω (stéphō, “I encircle”), Lat. Stephanus = wreath, decorative wreath worn on the head; crown) was a decorative headband or circlet made of metal, often seen on depictions of high-status ancient Roman and Greek women, as well as goddesses. The stephane often consisted of a metal arc that was higher in the center than along the sides. It was set atop a woman's hair, with or without a veil. It resembled a crown.

Many ancient Greek and Roman coins show a queen's portrait on the obverse, with her wearing a veil with a stephane.

== See also ==
- Clothing in the ancient world
  - Clothing in ancient Greece
- Chiton (costume)
- Exomis
- Himation
- Peplos
- Zoster (costume)
