= Belly chain =

Body jewelry worn around the waist

A belly chain or waist chain is the popular English term for the Indian jewelry called kamarbandh. It is also the popular English term for the Egyptian jewelry called hezam. The belly chain is a type of body jewelry worn around the waist. Some belly chains attach to a navel piercing; these are also called "pierced belly chains". They are often made of silver or gold. Sometimes a thread is used around the waist instead of a chain. The chain may be delicate and thin, or heavy and thick.

Belly chains are considered auspicious for women in Indian culture.

In Egyptian culture, belly chains are used for fashion, adornment, and dancing.

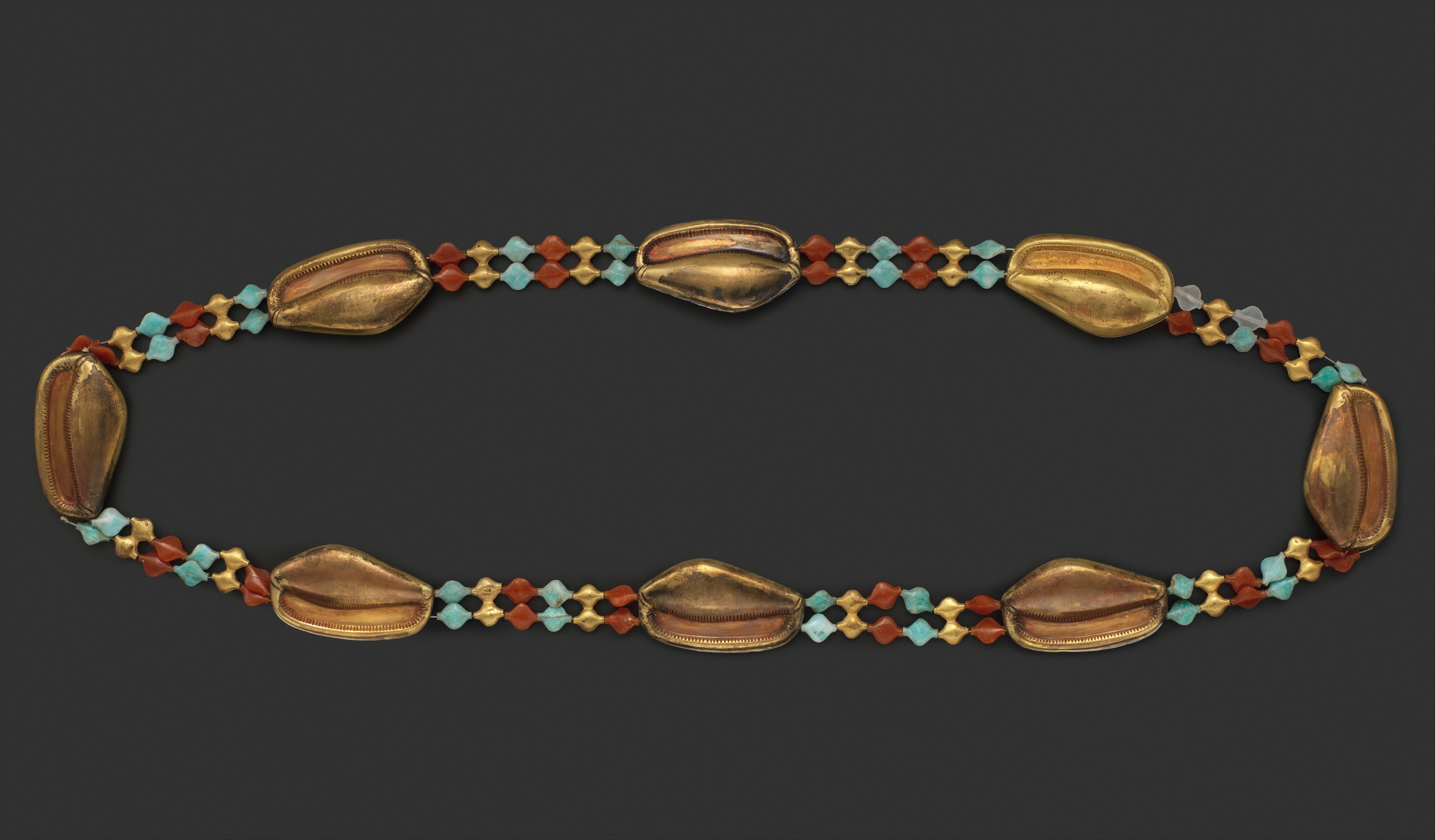
Ancient Egyptian Cowrie Shell Girdle of Sithanthorunet

== History ==
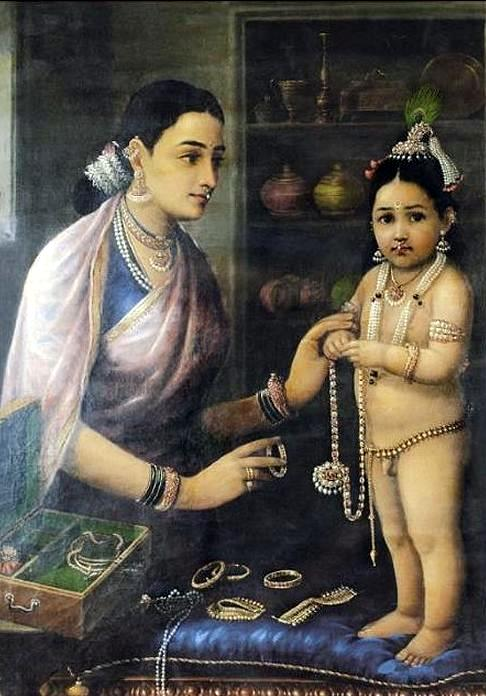
Hindu god Krishna wearing belly chain

The use of waist chains can be traced back to 7000 years or more originating in Ancient Egypt, or 4000 years or more originating in the Indian Subcontinent. Historically, waist chains have been used in India, by men and women, as ornaments and as part of religious ceremonies, as accessories and to show affluence.

Many ancient sculptures and paintings from locations in India, dating back to the Indus Valley civilization, indicate that waist chains were a very popular jewelry. Many deities in the Hinduism, such as Lord Krishna, wore waist chains. A waistband called cummerbund or patka was a part of the medieval upper class costume of Rajasthanis.

A 14th-century poem indicates that the waist chain has been a fashion for men in some parts of South India.

Chain girdles with large silver beads and amulet cases (shaped like triangles, cucumbers, and squares) hanging from them were used by 19th century Egyptian dancers as a way to accentuate their hip movements. Strings of gold coins were also used and evolved into the belts often used by bellydancers today.

== Contemporary practice and trends ==
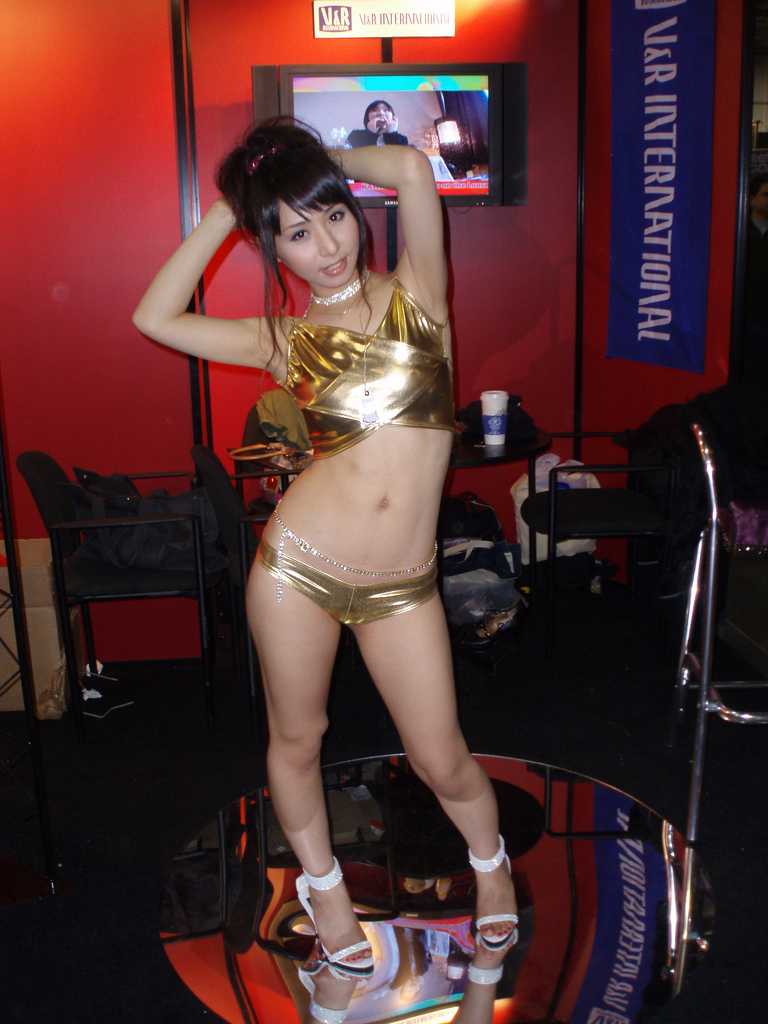
A woman wearing a belly chain

Belly chains are common among women in India. In some regions waist chains are common among men as well. In the southern Indian state of Tamil Nadu, every newborn receives a waist chain as a cultural pact.

Namboothri men generally wear waist strings even as adults. In some aristocratic families, Namboothiri men wore a flattened triple gold string around the waist. As a Hindu custom newborns get a waist chain (Aranjanam) on the 28th day after their birth. In Kerala, almost all newborns irrespective of the religious affiliation get a waist chain. Although many boys generally abandon waist chains during their teenage years, most girls and a sizable number of boys continue to wear waist chains as adults. A follower of Lord Siva is expected to wear a chain, with Rudrakshas strung in a white chain with one hundred beads, around the waist. In Lakshdweep a silver thread is worn by both men and women. Dhodia and Kathodis or Katkari men use ornaments around the waist.

For cultural reasons, waist chains became a fashion accessory for women and men in many parts of the world.

A similar garment of beads worn around the waist has appeared in several aspects of African culture such as dress, childcare, and relationships. Notably in Ghanaian and Nigerian culture, these waist beads have functioned as slings for loincloths, and as support when a child is carried on one's back. In childcare, they have been included as part of naming ceremonies and to measure growth until puberty. As the practice has spread throughout the diaspora, they have become accessories to express femininity, enhance sexuality by drawing attention to the hips, and serve as a symbol of fertility. Some women also wear them to achieve the appearance of a desired hourglass body shape.

== See also ==
- Chatelaine (chain)
- Necklace
- Waist cincher
