= Himation =

Ancient Greek clothing

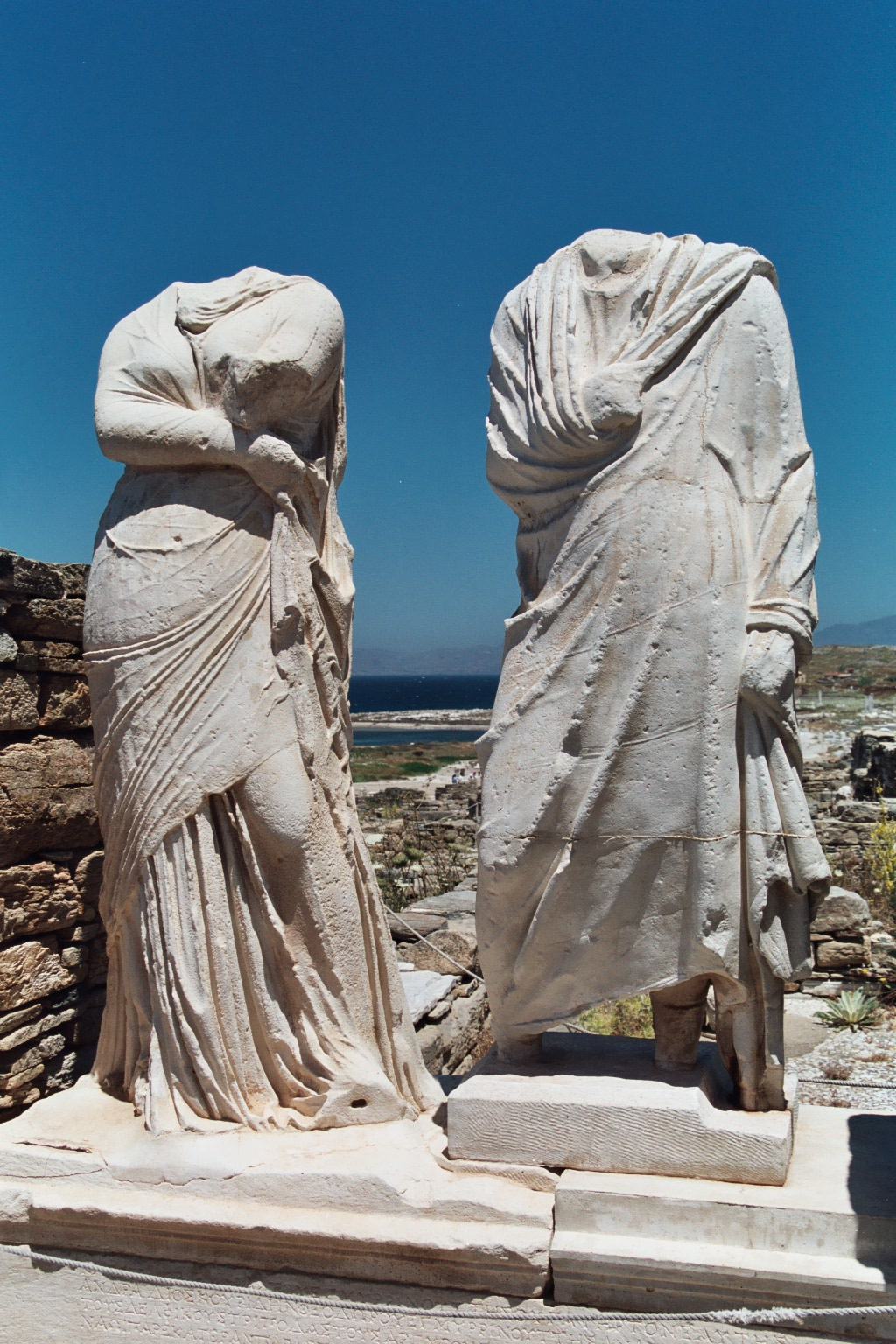
Statues at the "House of Cleopatra" in Delos, Greece. Woman and man wearing himatia

A himation (/hɪˈmætiɒn, -iən/ him-AT-ee-on, -ən; Ancient Greek: ἱμάτιον) (plural: himatia) was a type of clothing, a mantle or wrap worn by ancient Greek men and women from the Archaic period through the Hellenistic period (c. 750–30 BC). It was usually worn over a chiton or peplos, but was made of heavier drape and played the role of a cloak or shawl. When the himation was used alone, without a chiton, it served both as a chiton and as a cloak. The himation was markedly less voluminous than the Roman toga. Many vase paintings depict women wearing a himation as a veil covering their faces.

The himation continued into the Byzantine era as "iconographic dress" used in art and by the lower classes, worn by Christ, the Virgin Mary, and biblical figures.

== Origins ==
While there are no physical remains of himation that have been recovered, it is known that himation was worn by ancient Greeks as early as the 6th century BCE.

Through different decorations, pottery, and statues, it is known that himation was typically made out of wool and linen, usually in the color white. The production of himation was considered a woman's job, as they would spin the wool or linen into yarn and weave the yarn into a large piece of rectangular fabric. While a majority of the time women made himation in their homes, there were also professional weavers and dyers. Because of the price of the material, quality linen was typically reserved for the upper class of Greek society. It is thought that himation may have been patterned or embroidered with eye-catching colors and very complex patterns. These patterns would sometimes be woven into the thick wool or linen, or otherwise painted directly onto the himation.

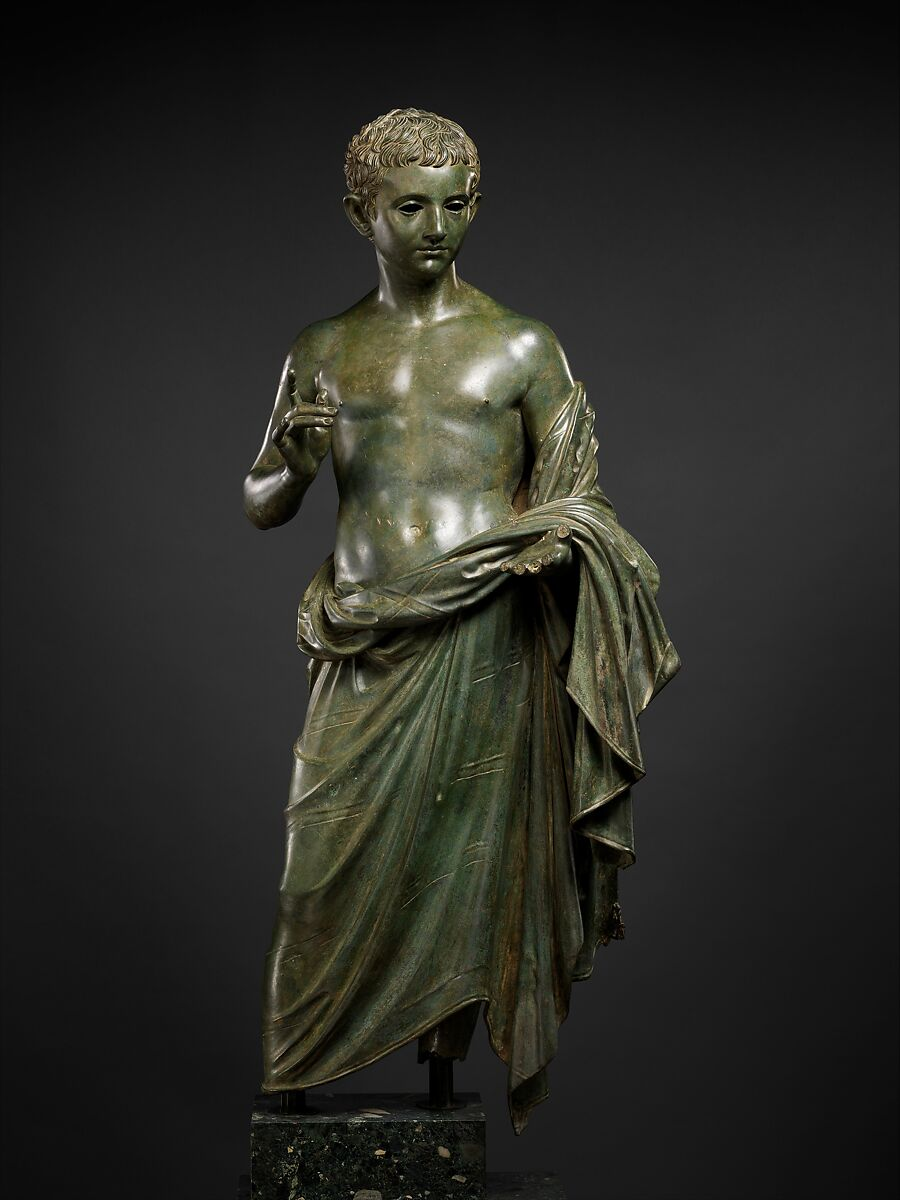
This image is the Bronze Statue of a Roman Aristocratic Boy, wearing himation, from the Metropolitan Museum of Art.

Himation was perhaps the most popular garment worn in ancient Greece, with many different styles of wearing. It also "served as an important means of nonverbal communication. A properly arranged himation conveyed elite status, while garments in disarray created opportunities for bodily display in homosexual and heterosexual courtship."

The himation became so popular that historians use the word to refer to a number of different Greek garments. Due to the popularity of himation, the ancient Romans also adopted the style, making himation a part of their society as well.

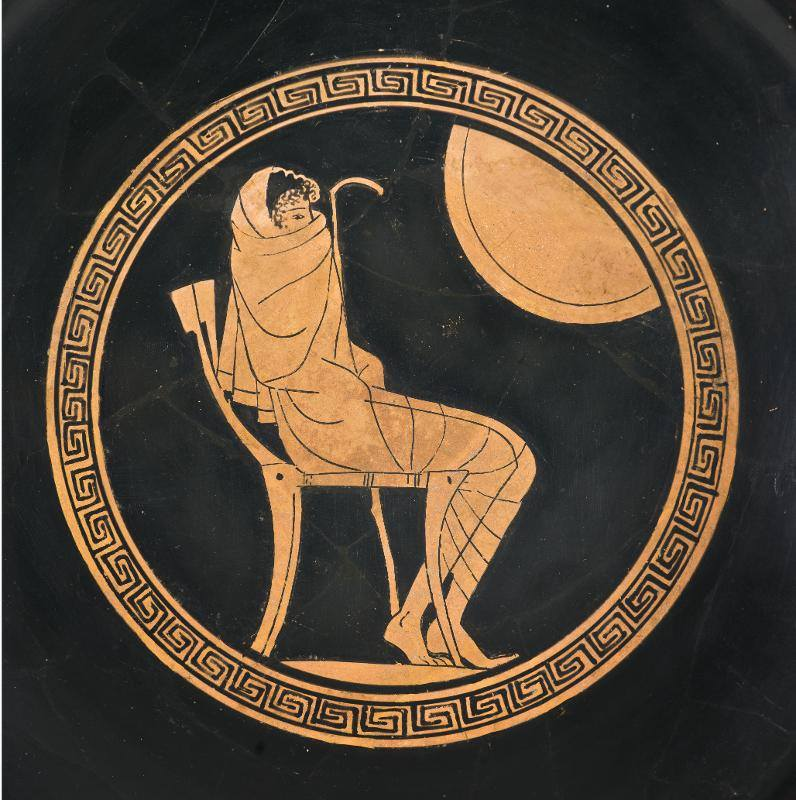
Sitting Achilles wrapped in a himation, from c. 500 BC

== Wearing styles ==
Himation is not kept in place using pins, unlike other types of Ancient Greek overgarments. When worn by men, the himation is draped over the left shoulder and wrapped around the rest of their body, except for their right arms. For women, the himation allows for either the right or the left arm to be freed from the garment.

Vases depicting life during the start of Archaic Greece showed that men of all ages and social classes wore the himation over the chiton. Women also started wearing both the chiton and himation during the same period and continued the practice into the Hellenistic period. Older boys, who are above the age of ephebos, when not wearing the style followed by adult men, covered their entire body with the himation.

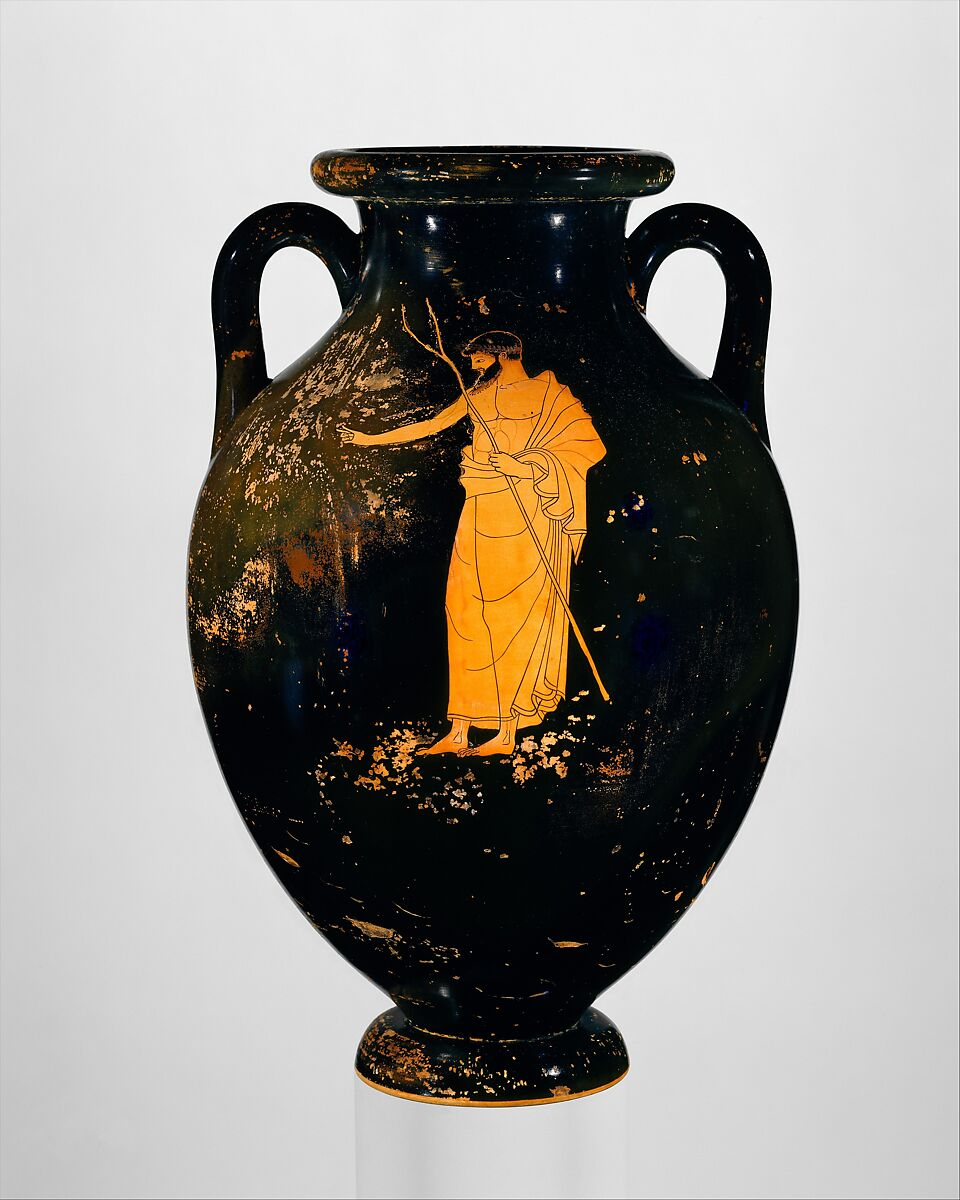
The Terracotta Amphora from the Metropolitan Museum of Art, showing a judge in himation

The style which a person adopts can provide a different meaning and society judges a person's character from how they chose to wear their himation. Ancient Greek philosophers at the time mention this perspective in their works. One of them, Theophrastus, described Boorishness in his work Characters, as a person who sits while allowing his himation to be draped above his knees.

Ancient Greek gods are often described as wearing himation in various situations. For example, Athena has been described as wearing an attic helmet, a peplos, an aegis with a small gorgoneion, and a himation. Another god that has been described as wearing a himation was Dionysos. In an explanation of a piece of artwork at the Baltimore Museum of Art, Dionysos is described as wearing "a himation and ivy wreath and carries Kantharos in uplifted left hand".

Not only did the everyday people of ancient Greek society wear himation, but the most divine figures throughout ancient Greece's history wore himation as well, showing just how popular of a garment it was.

== Men, women, and children in himation ==
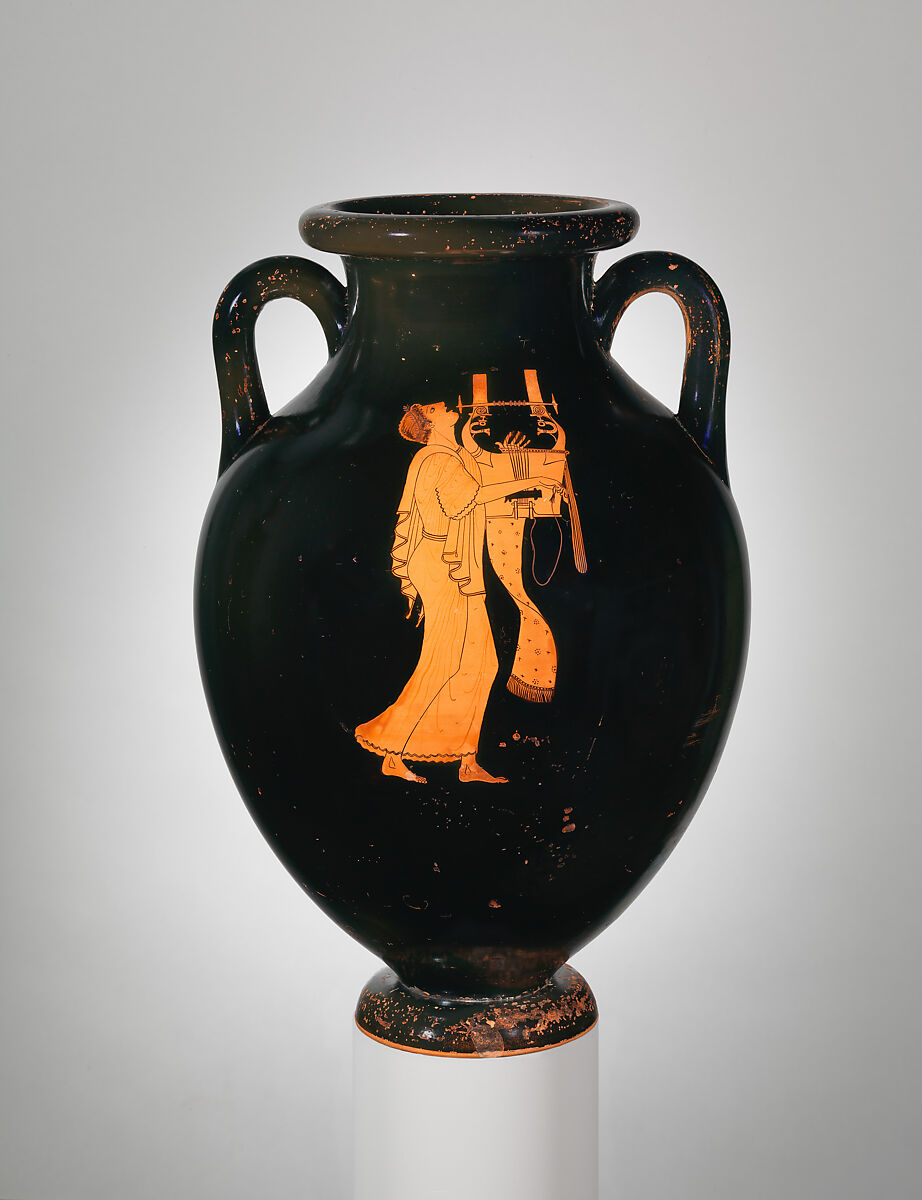
The other side of the Terracotta Amphora from The Metropolitan Museum of Art, showing a young man singing and playing the kithara

Women wearing himation did not come into fashion until around 500 BCE, with the end of the Archaic Period, when it became more frequently worn by women. Women commonly wore himation in public "as warm cloaks over their thin Ionic chitons". Himation was also often used to show off women's personal styles and their statuses in ancient Greek society. In the presence of strangers, himation doubled as a veil. Women were more relaxed with the configuration of their himation.

Men would sometimes wear himation in professional settings. At the Metropolitan Museum of Art in New York, an ancient greek piece of pottery, called the Terracotta Amphora, shows a Greek judge wearing himation. On the other side of the Terracotta Amphora, it shows a far less professional setting of a man wearing himation. In this image a young man is playing the kithara and singing. There were some unwritten rules men had when it came to wearing himation. One of which was the length that himation; if it went past the ankles and dragged, it was considered in poor taste. Also, if the left shoulder was exposed when wearing himation, the man was seen as barbaric.

Children also wore himation, "Notably the himation was sometimes worn by aristocratic Roman school boys, who were sent to schools taught by Greek tutors."

== See also ==
- Chiton (costume)
- Clothing in ancient Greece
- Clothing in the ancient world
- Exomis
- Stephane (Ancient Greece)
- Tunic
- Zoster (costume)
- Toga
