= Classic Shapewear =

American shapewear retailer

- Company type: Privately held company
- Industry: Apparel
- Founded: 2008; 18 years ago
- Headquarters: New York, NY, U.S.
- Products: Shapewear, waist cincher, lingerie, plus-size bras, panties, underwear, hosiery, activewear, bridal shapewear, sleepwear and swimwear
- Website: classicshapewear.com

Classic Shapewear is an American retailer of shaping undergarments for women and men. Classic Shapewear's headquarters are located in New York City.

== History ==
The company was formed in 2008 by a group of investors under the parent company Shapers Unlimited, Inc. and was originally intended to serve exclusively as an online retailer. However, the company later expanded to brick and mortar locations in New York and New Jersey. One of the company's most notable characteristics, as quoted by a company executive, is free shipping with every order regardless of the order amount.

On January 31, 2012 Classic Shapewear was featured on Jill's Deals & Steals, a shopping segment of NBC's Today Show.
