= Clothing in the ancient world =

What people wore in antiquity as inferred from archaeological and historical evidence

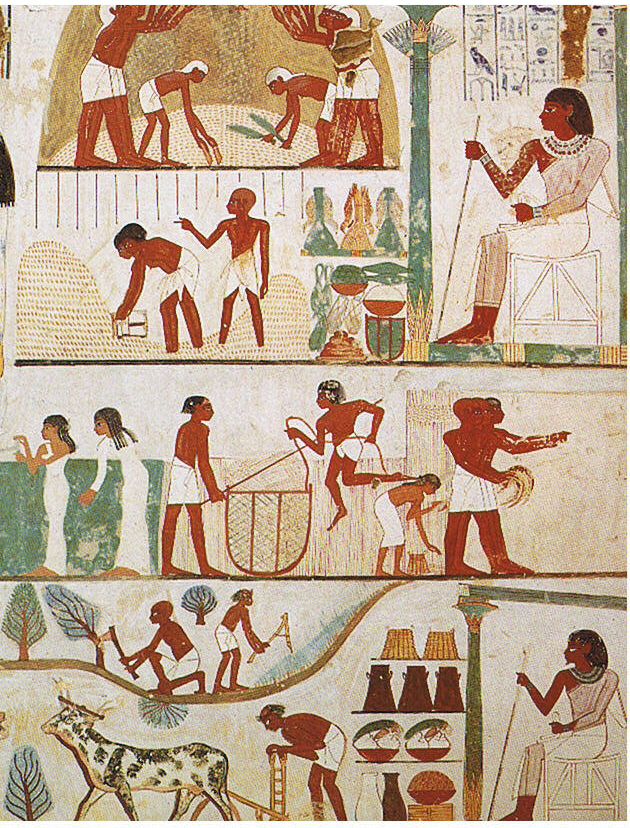
The clothing of men and women at several social levels of Ancient Egypt are depicted in this tomb mural from the 15th century BC

The preservation of fabric fibers and leathers allows for insights into the attire of ancient societies. The clothing used in the ancient world reflects the technologies that these peoples mastered. In many cultures, clothing indicated the social status of various members of society.

The development of attire and fashion is an exclusively human characteristic and is a feature of most human societies. Clothing made of materials such as animal skins and vegetation was initially used by early humans to protect their bodies from the elements. The usage of clothing and textiles across the ages reflects the varying development of civilizations and technologies. Sources available for the study of clothing and textiles include material remains discovered via archaeology; representation of textiles and their manufacture in art; and documents concerning the manufacture, acquisition, use, and trade of fabrics, tools, and finished garments.

== Egyptian clothing ==
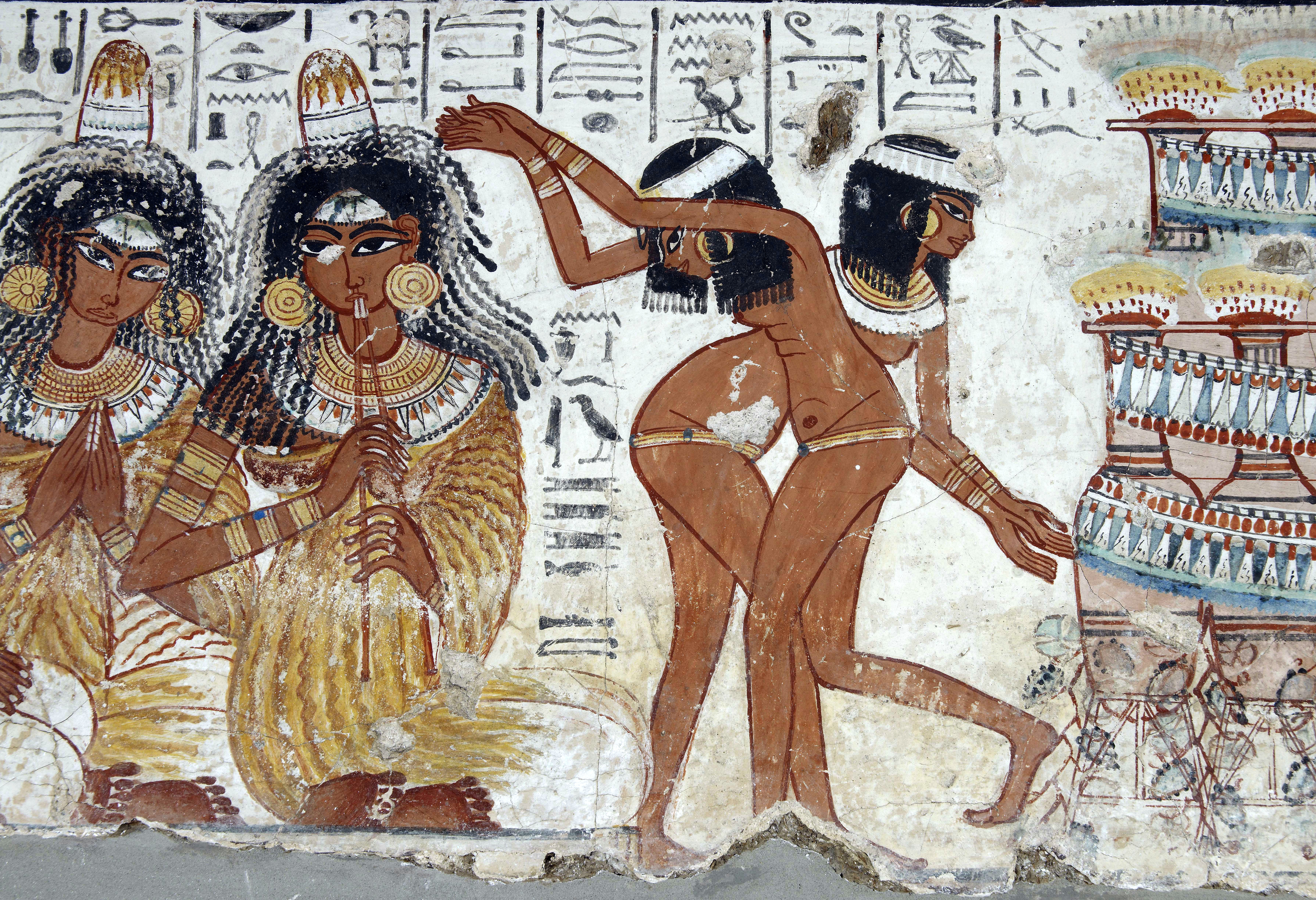
Women entertainers perform at a celebration in Ancient Egypt; the dancers are naked and the musician wears a typical pleated garment as well as the cone of perfumed fat on top of her wig that melts slowly to emit its precious odors; both groups wear extensive jewelry, wigs, and cosmetics; neither wear shoes – Tomb of Nebamun c. 1400 BC

=== Textile materials ===
Although aware of other materials, the ancient Egyptians most commonly used linen, a product made from the abundant flax plant. Due to a belief that animal-based fabrics were impure, wool was rarely used and was forbidden in places like temples and sanctuaries. Other animal-based products such as pelts were reserved for priests and eventually were adopted by only the highest class of ancient Egyptian citizenry. Linen is light, strong and flexible which made it ideal for life in the warm climate, where abrasion and heat would wear and tear at clothing. Thus, most ancient Egyptians used linen as their primary textile.

The material quality of garments differed between the classes, where those of the upper class used finer linens, depicted in statues and paintings by their translucency. They also used more complex drapery, designs and patterns that included dyed threads and feathers. These materials were expensive and the wearer showed greater status by wearing them. On the other hand, cheaper and thicker linen was used within the lower class, where shorter garments were worn by the working class for better mobility in the fields.

=== Garments ===
Men in ancient Egypt often wore the loincloth (or schenti common in all classes) although men of a higher class wore longer schenti, often pairing them with a draped cape or tunic. It was considered acceptable for men and women alike to bare their chests, in both upper and lower classes. A complete lack of clothing, however, was often associated with youth or poverty; it was common for children of all social classes to be unclothed up to the age of six, and for slaves to remain unclad for the majority of their lives. Certain clothing common to both genders included the tunic and the robe. Around 1425 to 1405 BC, a light tunic or short-sleeved shirt was popular, as well as a pleated skirt.

Clothing for adult women remained unchanged over several millennia, save for small details. Draped clothes with very large rolls gave the impression of wearing several items. The dress was rather narrow and even constricting, made of white or unbleached fabric for the lower classes. Garments worn by higher classes featured sleeves starting under the chest and were held up by suspenders tied onto the shoulders. These suspenders sometimes covered the breasts, other times passing between them, and were painted and colored for various reasons such as to imitate the plumage on the wings of Isis.

The characteristic of the female garment in ancient Egypt Old Kingdom was a short skirt for the lower classes, or a kalasiris, a longer skirt reaching from the ankles to just below, or just above the breasts. By the Middle Kingdom, long kilts were a fashion. They were like skirts, reaching from waist to ankles, sometimes even hanging from the armpits. The New Kingdom was the more luxurious period; people wore more clothing, sometimes in layers, with an inner and an outer garment. This outer layer was made of particularly fine, diaphanous pleated linen, and would appear almost transparent.

Clothing of the royal family was different, and was well documented; for instance the crowns of the Pharaohs as mentioned below, feather headdresses, and the khat or head cloth were all worn by nobility.

Shoes were the same for both sexes; sandals braided with leather, or, particularly for the bureaucratic and priestly classes, papyrus.

=== Perfume and cosmetics ===
Embalming made it possible to develop cosmetic products and perfumery very early. Perfumes in Egypt were scented oils which were very expensive. In antiquity, people made great use of them. The Egyptians used make-up much more than anyone else at the time. Kohl, used as eyeliner, was galena. Eye paint was the most common form and was used to shield the eyes from the sun.The reason for them to wear eye makeup is to protect the eyes from the sun's rays and ward off infection. The dramatic makeup also imitated the facial markings of the sun god Horus, who was often depicted as a falcon. Eye shadow was made of crushed malachite and lipstick of ochre. Substances used in some of the cosmetics were toxic, and had adverse health effects with prolonged use. Beauty products were generally mixed with animal fats in order to make them more compact, more easily handled and to preserve them. Only women had tattoos.It was also fashionable at parties for men and women to wear a perfumed cone on top of their heads. The cone was usually made of ox tallow and myrrh and as time passed, it melted and released a pleasant perfume. When the cone melted it was replaced with a new one (see the adjacent image with the musician and dancers). The use of cosmetics differed slightly between social classes, where more make-up was worn by higher class individuals as wealthier individuals could afford more make-up. Although there was no prominent difference between the cosmetics styles of the upper and lower class, noble women were known to pale their skin using creams and powders. This was due to pale skin being a sign of nobility as lighter skin meant less exposure to the sun whereas dark skin was associated with the lower class who tanned while taking part in menial labor such as working in the fields. This led to paler skin represented the non-working noble class, as noble woman would not work in the sun.

=== Wigs and headdresses ===
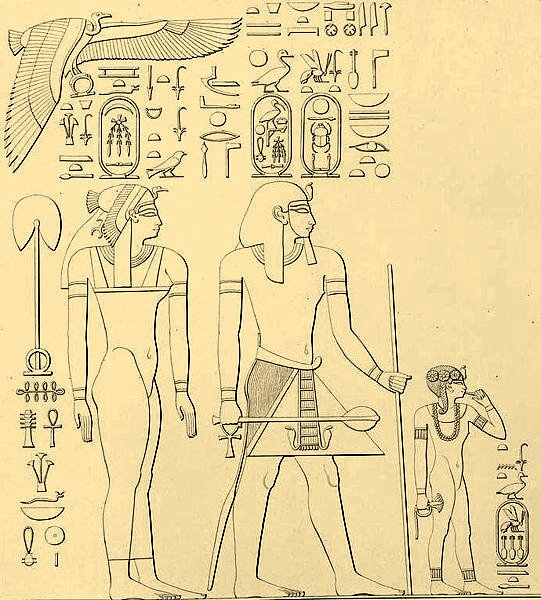
Queen Ahmose, Pharaoh Thutmose I, and daughter Neferubity – note the youthful sidelock on the child and the royal attire and wigs on the adults

Although heads were shaven as both as a sign of nobility and due to the hot climate, hairstyle was a huge part of ancient Egyptian fashion through the use of wigs. Wigs were used by both sexes of the upper and lower class; the quality of wigs depended on the amount of disposable income available, which created a visual rift between classes. Good quality wigs were made of human hair and were ornamented with jewels and woven with gold. In the court, the more elegant examples had small goblets at the top filled with perfume; Pharaohs even wore wig beards for certain special occasions. There is evidence of cheaper wigs made from wool and palm fibres, which were further substituted the woven gold used in its more expensive counterpart with beads and linen. The ancient Egyptians talent with substitution enabled wigs and headdresses to be worn by all social classes; for example. the nemes headdress, made from stiff linen and draped over the shoulders was reserved for the elite class to protect the wearer from the sun. On the other hand, headdresses such as the pschent were exclusive for the Pharaoh. Pharaohs also wore various crowns to identify different divinities, such as the horned crown of the goddess Hathor. In both social classes children were represented with one lock of hair remaining on the right side of their head (see the adjacent image). The most common headgear was the kaften, a striped fabric square worn by men.

=== Ornaments ===
Ornaments could be worn by all and were even woven into hair, resulting in wigs containing ornamental decorations.

=== Jewellers ===
It was common for ancient Egyptians to be covered in jewellery because they believed it made them more attractive to the Gods. The upper class Egyptians were fascinated with gold jewelry. They believe that gold is the color of the sun, and it symbolises the sun's permanence and immortality, because this metal does not corrode or oxidize with time. Accessories were often embellished with inlaid precious and semi-precious stones such as emeralds, pearls, and lapis lazuli, to create intricate patterns inspired from nature. Common motifs included white lotuses, palm leaves, and even animals that represented the gods. Although the jewellery used by the lower class had similar motifs and designs, they were made with cheaper substitute materials. Copper was used in place of gold, and glazed glass or faience – a mix of ground quartz and colorant – to imitate precious stones. The most popular stones used were lapis lazuli, carnelian, and turquoise. The lower classes wore small and simple glassware; bracelets also were heavy. They wore a large disk as a necklace of strength, sometimes described as an aegis. Gold was plentiful in Nubia and imported for jewelry and other decorative arts.

== Minoan clothing ==
As elsewhere, Cretan clothes in the ancient times were well documented in their artwork where many items worn by priestesses and priests seem to reflect the clothing of most. Wool and flax were used. Spinning and weaving were domestic activities, using a similar technique to the Egyptians of the time. Fabrics were often embroidered and dyed.

Minoan clothing is exceptionally gendered, male clothing is in general sparse and uniform, whereas female clothing has much variety and intricacy; indicating well defined social constructs around gender.

=== Female Minoan dress ===
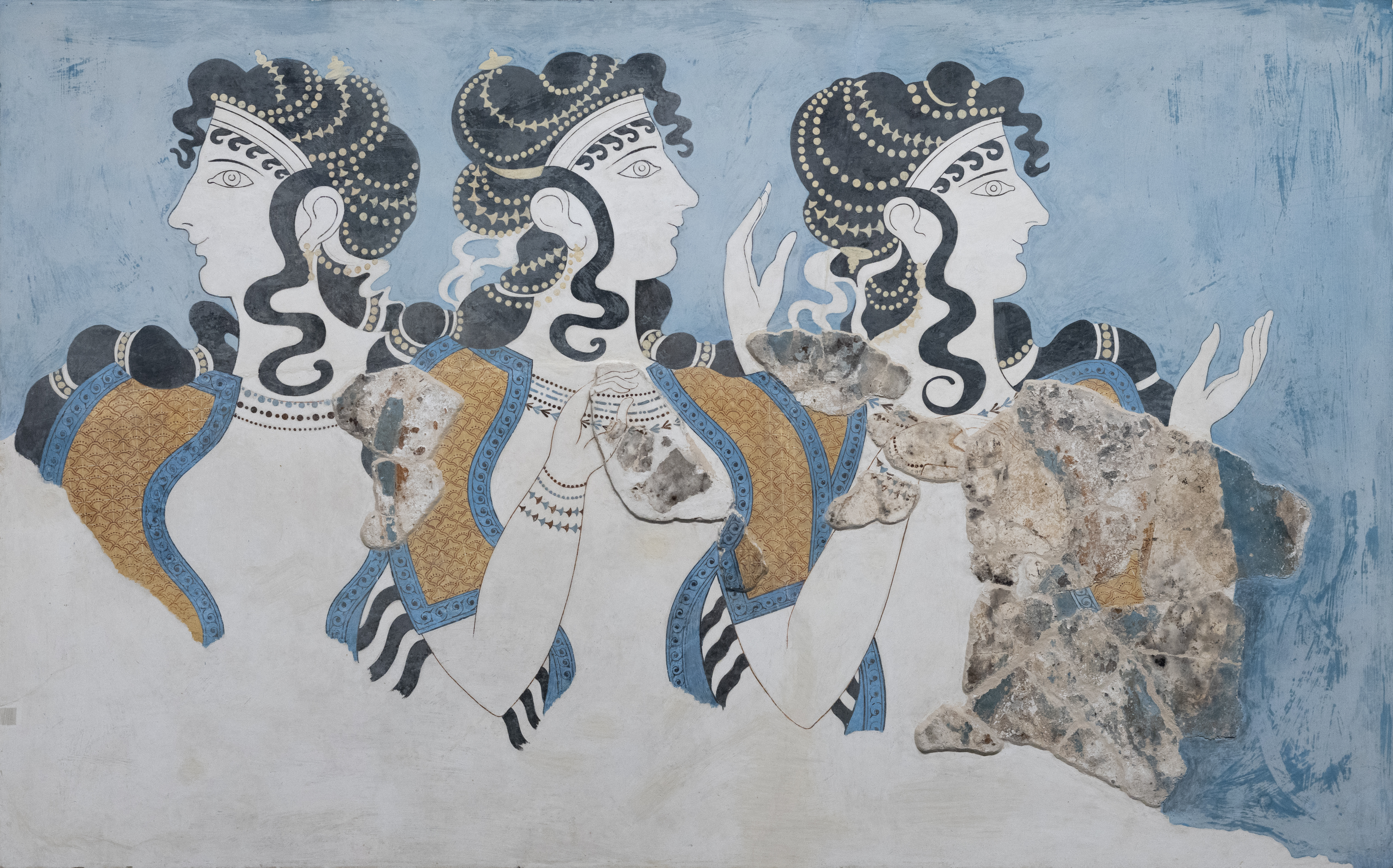
Fresco of three Cretan women in the open blouse that was typical in the later Minoan Culture - their skirts would have begun at the waist, were flounced, and of many colorful patterns

In Minoan culture the loincloth was worn by both men and women. They are often illustrated in statuettes with a large dagger fixed at the belt. In contrast to Minoan males, females would wear less jewelry, though elaborate hairstyles were equally common.

Cretan women's clothing included the first sewn garments known to history. Dresses were long and low-necked, with the bodice being open almost all the way to the waist, leaving the breasts exposed. Dresses were often accompanied by the Minoan corset, an early form of corset created as a close fitting blouse, designed to narrow the waist. The belt, also kept tight, and used to narrow the waist before the corset, a long or short coat, or a hat were used to supplement the female outfit. Ancient brooches, widespread in the Mediterranean, were used throughout the period.

The fabric of women's clothes in elite portraits shows that colourful dyes were common as was intricate embroidery.

=== Male Minoan dress ===
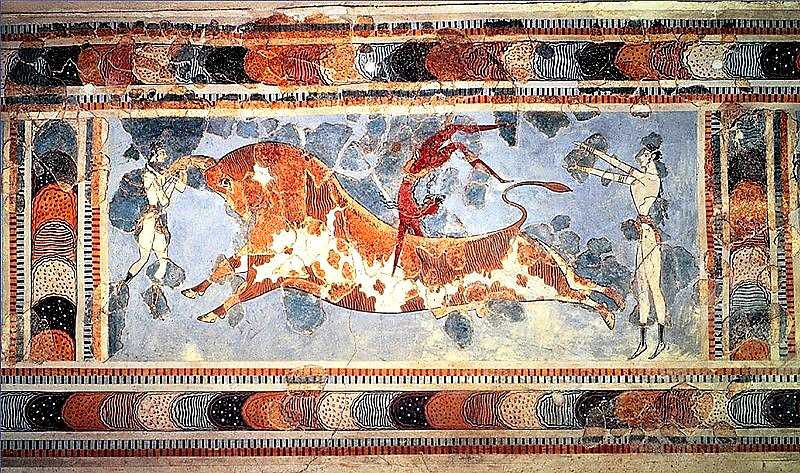
The loincloth worn by both men and women of Crete is shown in this fresco of a religious event where the women are light-skinned and the man is deeply tanned.

Our knowledge of the dress of male minoans is exceptionally limited as most depictions focus on women. Where we see men they are depicted they wearing a phallic sheath or codpiece. These would sometimes be embroidered or with a simple patterned border. Males are also frequently seen wearing a tight fitting belt, perhaps to accentuate the waist.

Men appear to have grown their hair long, and styled it in a variety of ways, including elaborate braids and knots.

== Israelite clothing ==
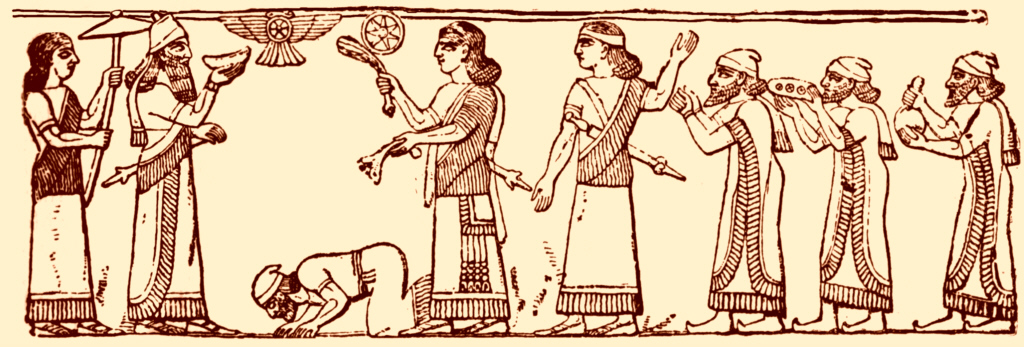
In a rare depiction of Israelite clothing, King Jehu, or possibly his ambassador, kneels at the feet of Shalmaneser III on the Black Obelisk.

=== Men ===
==== Undergarments ====
The earliest and most basic garment was the ezor (/eɪˈzɔːr/ ay-ZOR) or ḥagor (/xəˈɡɔːr/ khə-GOR), an apron around the hips or loins, that in primitive times was made from the skins of animals. It was a simple piece of cloth worn in various modifications, but always worn next to the skin. Garments were held together by a belt or girdle, also called an ezor or ḥagor.

The ezor later became displaced among the Hebrews by the kuttoneth (/kɛˈtɔːnɛt/ ket-AW-net). an under-tunic. The kuttoneth appears in Assyrian art as a tight-fitting undergarment, sometimes reaching only to the knee, sometimes to the ankle. The kuttoneth corresponds to the undergarment of the modern Middle Eastern agricultural laborers: a rough cotton tunic with loose sleeves and open at the breast. Anyone dressed only in the kuttoneth was considered naked.

==== Outer garments ====
simla

The simla (/sɪmˈlɑː/ sim-LAH) was the heavy outer garment or shawl of various forms. It consisted of a large rectangular piece of rough, heavy woolen material, crudely sewn together so that the front was unstitched and with two openings left for the arms. Flax is another possible material.

In the day it was protection from rain and cold, and at night peasant Israelites could wrap themselves in this garment for warmth (see Deuteronomy 24:13). The front of the simla also could be arranged in wide folds (see Exodus 4:6) and all kinds of products could be carried in it (See 2Kings 4:39, Exodus 12:34).

Every respectable man generally wore the simla over the kuttoneth (See Isaiah 20:2–3), but since the simla hindered work, it was either left home or removed when working. (See Matthew 24:18). From this simple item of the common people developed the richly ornamented mantle of the well-off, which reached from the neck to the knees and had short sleeves.

me'il

The me'il (/məˈiːl/ mə-EEL) or cloak was generally worn over the undergarment, (See 1Samuel 2:19, 1Samuel 15:27). The me'il was a costly wrap (See 1Samuel 2:19, 1Samuel 18:4, 1Samuel 24:5, 1Samuel 24:11) and, according to the description of the priest's me'il, was similar to the sleeveless abaya (Exodus 28:31). This, like the me'il of the high priest, may have reached only to the knees, but it is commonly supposed to have been a long-sleeved garment made of a light fabric, probably imported from Syria.

==== Religious wear ====
The Torah commands that Israelites wear tassels or fringes (ẓiẓit, /tsiːˈtsiːt/ tsee-TSEET or gedilim, /ɡɛˈdiːl/ ghed-EEL) attached to the corners of garments (see Deuteronomy 22:12, Numbers 15:38). Women would wear head coverings.

Phylacteries or tefillin (Hebrew: תְפִלִּין) are in use by New Testament times (see Matthew 23:5). Tefillin are boxes containing biblical verses that are attached to the forehead and arm by leather straps. They are worn only during prayer.

==== Headwear ====
Depictions show some Hebrews and Syrians bareheaded or wearing merely a band to hold the hair together. Hebrew peasants undoubtedly also wore head coverings similar to the modern keffiyeh, a large square piece of woolen cloth folded diagonally in half into a triangle. The fold is worn across the forehead, with the keffiyeh loosely draped around the back and shoulders, often held in place by a cord circlet. Men and women of the upper classes wore a kind of turban, cloth wound about the head. The shape varied greatly.

==== Footwear ====
Sandals (na'alayim) of leather were worn to protect the feet from burning sand and dampness. Sandals might also be of wood, with leather straps (Genesis 14:23, Isaiah 5:27). Sandals were not worn in the house nor in the sanctuary (see Exodus 3:5, Joshua 5:15).

=== Women ===
A woman's garments mostly corresponded to those of men: they wore simla and kuttoneth. Women's garments evidently differed too from that of men (see Deuteronomy 22:5). Women's garments were probably longer (compare Nahum 3:5, Jeremiah 13:22, Jeremiah 13:26, Isaiah 47:2), had sleeves (2Samuel 13:19), presumably were brighter colors and more ornamented, and may also have been of finer material.

Women used to wear veils in public, which distinguished them from women in pagan ancient societies. Even as the custom of veiling dwindled among other ancient societies Israelite females retained it for religious identification. Shawls, dictated by Jewish piety, and other forms of head coverings were also worn by ancient Israelite women in towns such as Jerusalem.

== Greek clothing ==
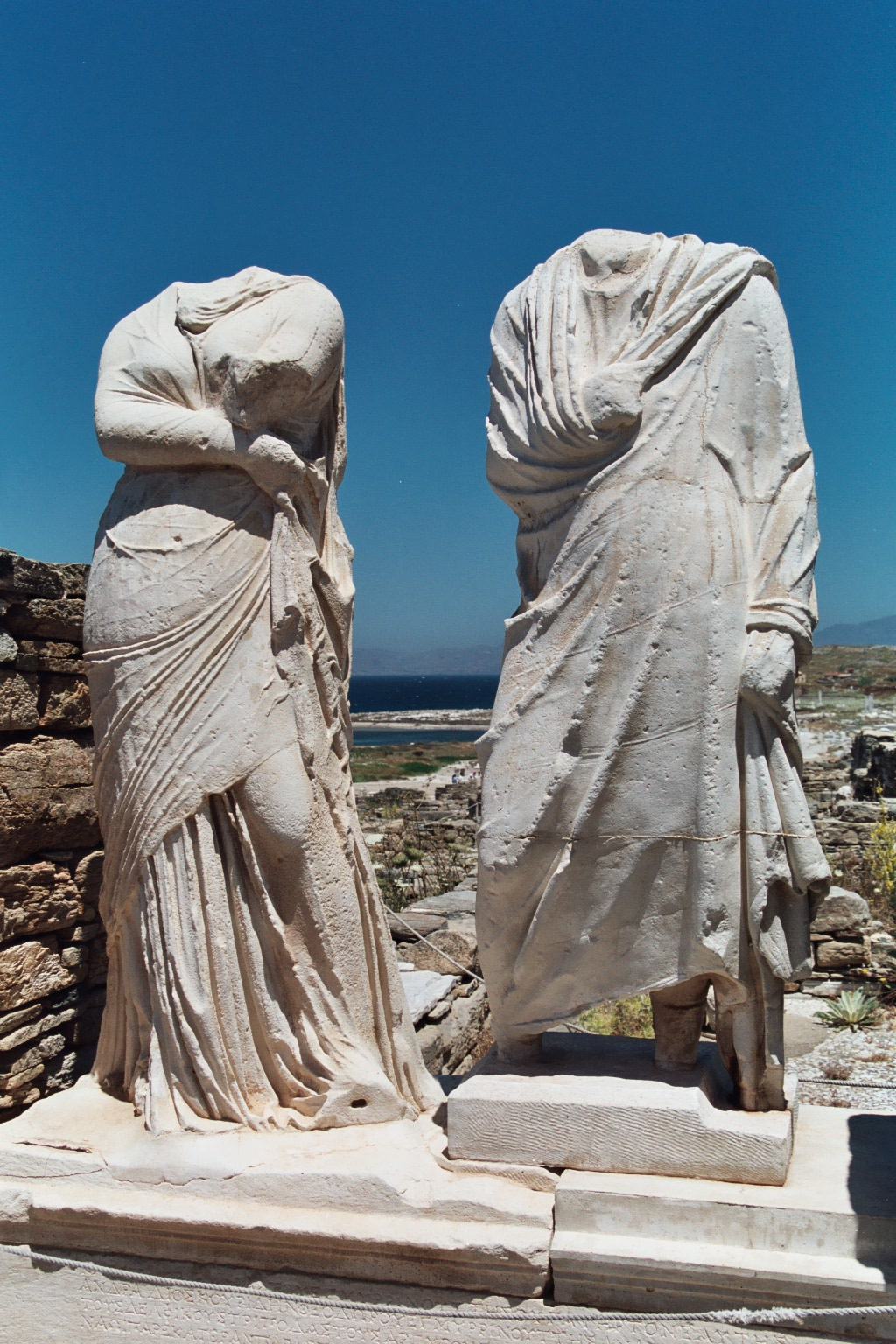
Statues at the "House of Cleopatra" in Delos, Greece. Man and woman wearing the himation

Ancient Greece is famous for its philosophy, art, literature, and politics. As a result, classical period Greek style in dress often has been revived when later societies wished to evoke some revered aspect of ancient Greek civilization, such as democratic government. A Greek style in dress became fashionable in France shortly after the French Revolution (1789–1799), because the style was thought to express the democratic ideals for which that revolution was fought, no matter how incorrect the understanding of the historical reality was.

Clothing reformers later in the 19th century AD admired ancient Greek dress because they thought it represented timeless beauty, the opposite of complicated and rapidly changing fashions of their time, as well as the more practical reasoning that Grecian-style dresses required far less cloth than those of the Rococo period.

Clothing in ancient Greece primarily consisted of the chiton, peplos, himation, and chlamys. While no clothes have survived from this period, descriptions exist from contemporary accounts and artistic depiction. Clothes were mainly homemade, and often served many purposes (such as bedding). Despite popular imagination and media depictions of all-white clothing, elaborate design and bright colors were favored.

Ancient Greek clothing consisted of lengths of linen or wool fabric, which generally was rectangular. Clothes were secured with ornamental clasps or pins (περόνη, perónē; cf. fibula), and a belt, sash, or girdle (zone) might secure the waist.

Peplos, Chitons

The inner tunic was a peplos or chiton. The peplos was worn by women. It was usually a heavier woollen garment, more distinctively Greek, with its shoulder clasps. The upper part of the peplos was folded down to the waist to form an apoptygma. The chiton was a simple tunic garment of lighter linen, worn by both genders and all ages. Men's chitons hung to the knees, whereas women's chitons fell to their ankles. Often the chiton is shown as pleated. Either garment could be pulled up under the belt to blouse the fabric: kolpos.

Strophion, Epiblema, Veil

A strophion was an undergarment sometimes worn by women around the mid-portion of the body, and a shawl (epiblema) could be draped over the tunic. Women dressed similarly in most areas of ancient Greece although in some regions, they also wore a loose veil as well at public events and market.

Chlamys

The chlamys was made from a seamless rectangle of woolen material worn by men as a cloak; it was about the size of a blanket, usually bordered. The chlamys was typical Greek military attire from the 5th to 3rd century BC. As worn by soldiers, it could be wrapped around the arm and used as a light shield in combat.

Himation

The basic outer garment during winter was the himation, a larger cloak worn over the peplos or chlamys. The himation has been most influential perhaps on later fashion.

Athletics and nudity

During Classical times in Greece, male nudity received a religious sanction following profound changes in the culture. After that time, male athletes participated in ritualized athletic competitions such as the classical version of the ancient Olympic Games, in the nude as women became barred from the competition except as the owners of racing chariots. Their ancient events were discontinued, one of which (a footrace for women) had been the sole original competition. Myths relate that after this prohibition, a woman was discovered to have won the competition while wearing the clothing of a man—instituting the policy of nudity among the competitors that prevented such embarrassment again.

== Roman and Italic clothing ==
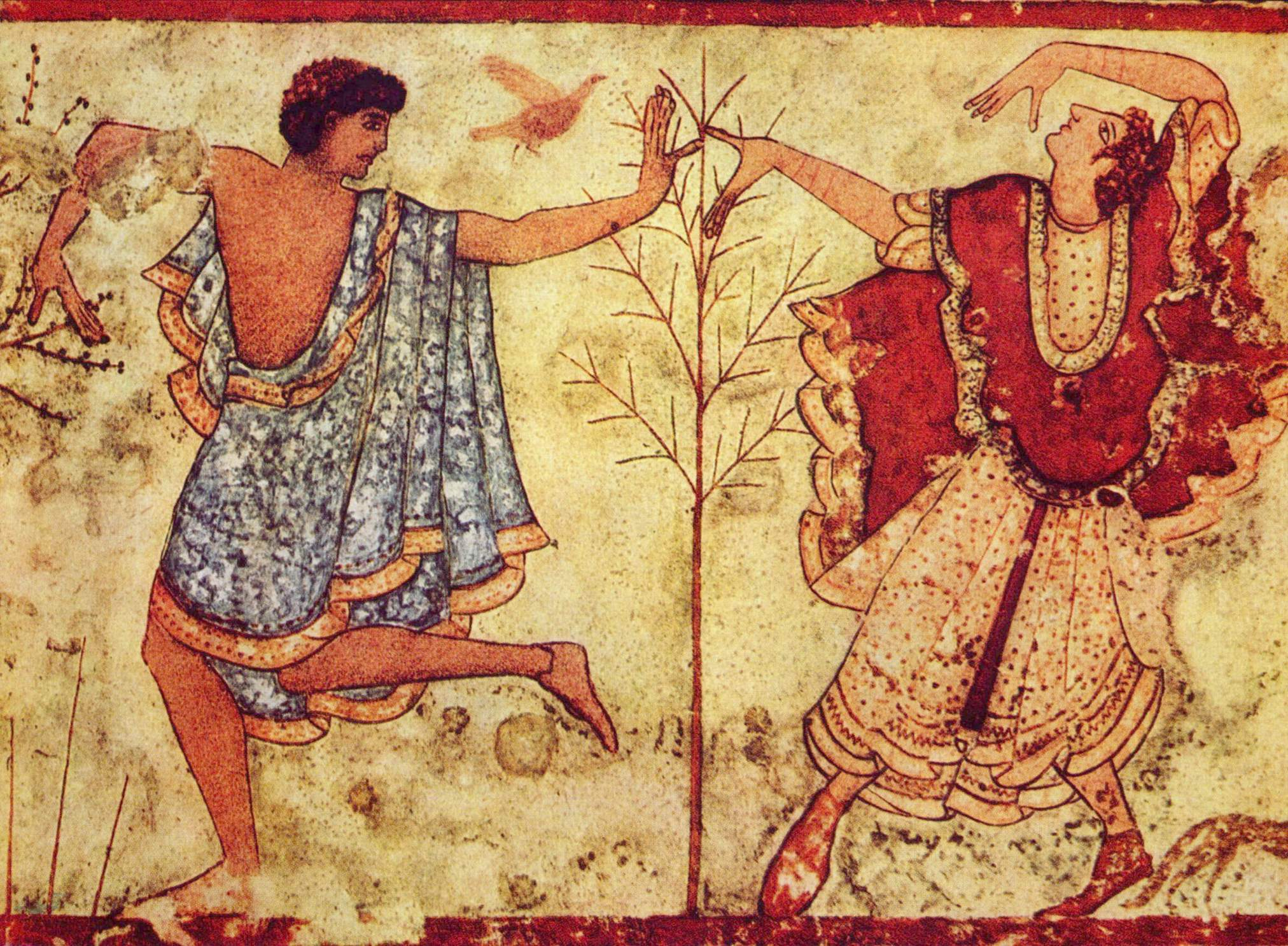
Etruscan dancers in the Tomb of the Triclinium near Tarquinia, Italy (470 BC)

The clothing of ancient Italy, like that of ancient Greece, is well known from art, literature & archaeology. Although aspects of Roman clothing have had an enormous appeal to the Western imagination, the dress and customs of the Etruscan civilization that inhabited Italy before the Romans are less well imitated (see the adjacent image), but the resemblance in their clothing may be noted. The Etruscan culture is dated from 1200 BC through the first two phases of the Roman periods. At its maximum extent during the foundation period of Rome and the Roman kingdom, it flourished in three confederacies of cities: of Etruria, of the Po valley with the eastern Alps, and of Latium and Campania. Rome was sited in Etruscan territory. There is considerable evidence that early Rome was dominated by Etruscans until the Romans sacked Veii in 396 BC.

In ancient Rome, boys after the age of sixteen had their clothes burned as a sign of growing up. Roman girls also wore white until they were married to say they were pure and virginal.

=== Toga and tunics ===
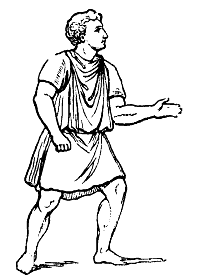
The tunic was adapted into many styles and was the basic garment of adults in ancient Rome after the 2nd century BC

Probably the most significant item in the ancient Roman wardrobe was the toga, a one-piece woolen garment that draped loosely around the shoulders and down the body. Togas could be wrapped in different ways, and they became larger and more voluminous over the centuries. Some innovations were purely fashionable. Because it was not easy to wear a toga without tripping over it or trailing drapery, some variations in wrapping served a practical function. Other styles were required, for instance, for covering the head during ceremonies.

Historians believe that originally the toga was worn by all Romans during the combined centuries of the Roman monarchy and its successor, the Roman Republic. At this time it is thought that the toga was worn without undergarments. Free citizens were required to wear togas because only slaves and children wore tunics. By the 2nd century BC, however, it was worn over a tunic, and the tunic became the basic item of dress for both men and women. Women wore an outer garment known as a stola, which was a long pleated dress similar to the Greek chitons.

Although togas are now thought of as the only clothing worn in ancient Italy, in fact, many other styles of clothing were worn and also are familiar in images seen in artwork from the period. Garments could be quite specialized, for instance, for warfare, specific occupations, or for sports. In ancient Rome women athletes wore leather briefs and brassiere for maximum coverage but the ability to compete.

Girls and boys under the age of puberty sometimes wore a special kind of toga with a reddish-purple band on the lower edge, called the toga praetexta. This toga also was worn by magistrates and high priests as an indication of their status. The toga candida, an especially whitened toga, was worn by political candidates. Prostitutes wore the toga muliebris, rather than the tunics worn by most women. The toga pulla was dark-colored and worn for mourning, while the toga purpurea, of purple-dyed wool, was worn in times of triumph and by the Roman emperor.

After the transition of the Roman Republic into the Roman Empire in c. 44 BC, only men who were citizens of Rome wore the toga. Women, slaves, foreigners, and others who were not citizens of Rome wore tunics and were forbidden from wearing the toga. By the same token, Roman citizens were required to wear the toga when conducting official business. Over time, the toga evolved from a national to a ceremonial costume. Different types of togas indicated age, profession, and social rank. Roman writer Seneca criticized men who wore their togas too loosely or carelessly. He also criticized men who wore what were considered feminine or outrageous styles, including togas that were slightly transparent.

The late toga of adult citizens, the toga virilis, was made of plain white wool and worn after the age of fourteen. A woman convicted of adultery might be forced to wear a toga as a badge of shame and curiously, as a symbol of the loss of her female identity.

The ancient Romans were aware that their clothing differed from that of other peoples. In particular, they noted the long trousers worn by people they considered barbarians from the north, including the Germanic Franks and Goths. The figures depicted on ancient Roman armored breastplates often include barbarian warriors in shirts and trousers.

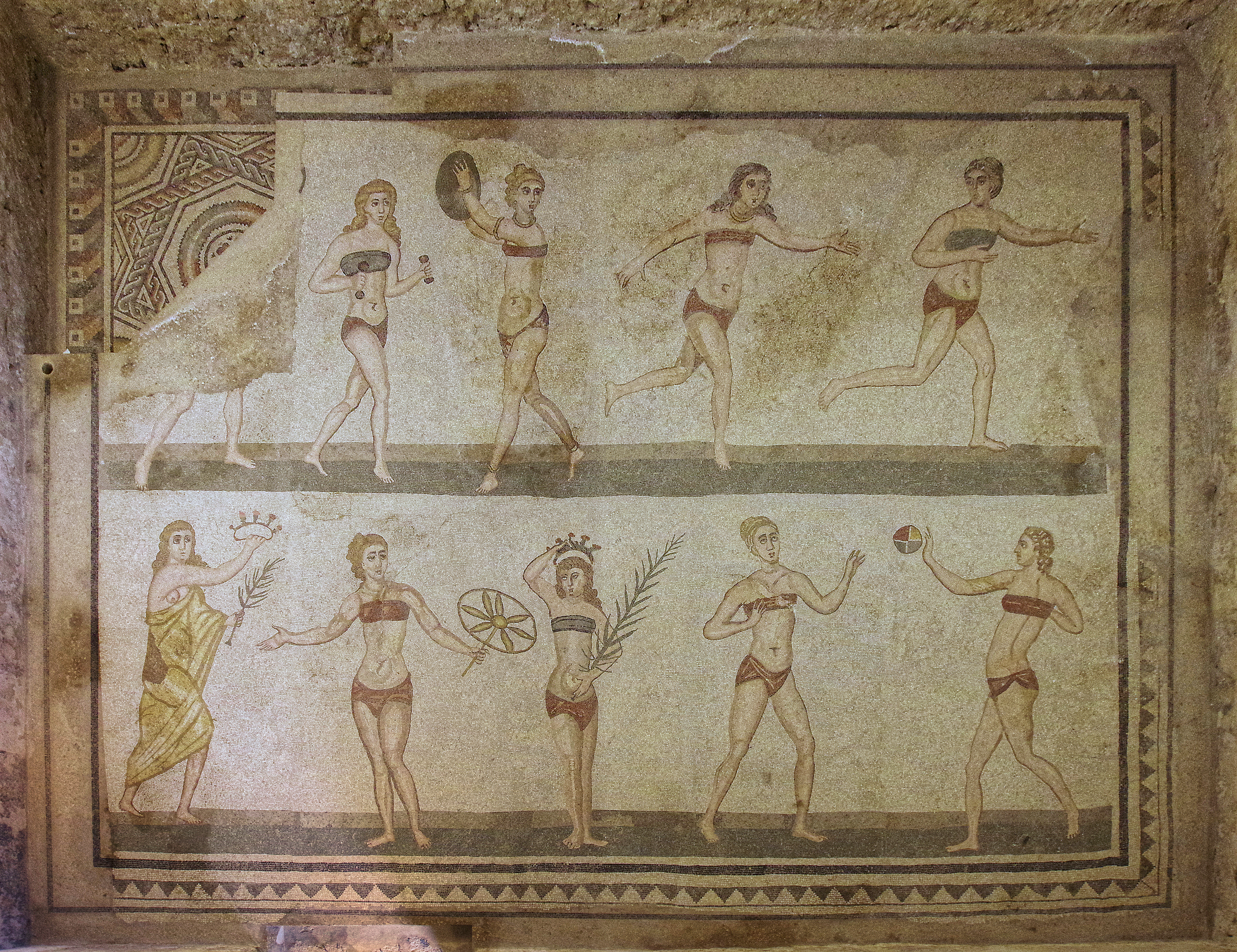
Mosaic of ancient women dressed for sports – Roman villa near Piazza Armerina – Sicily

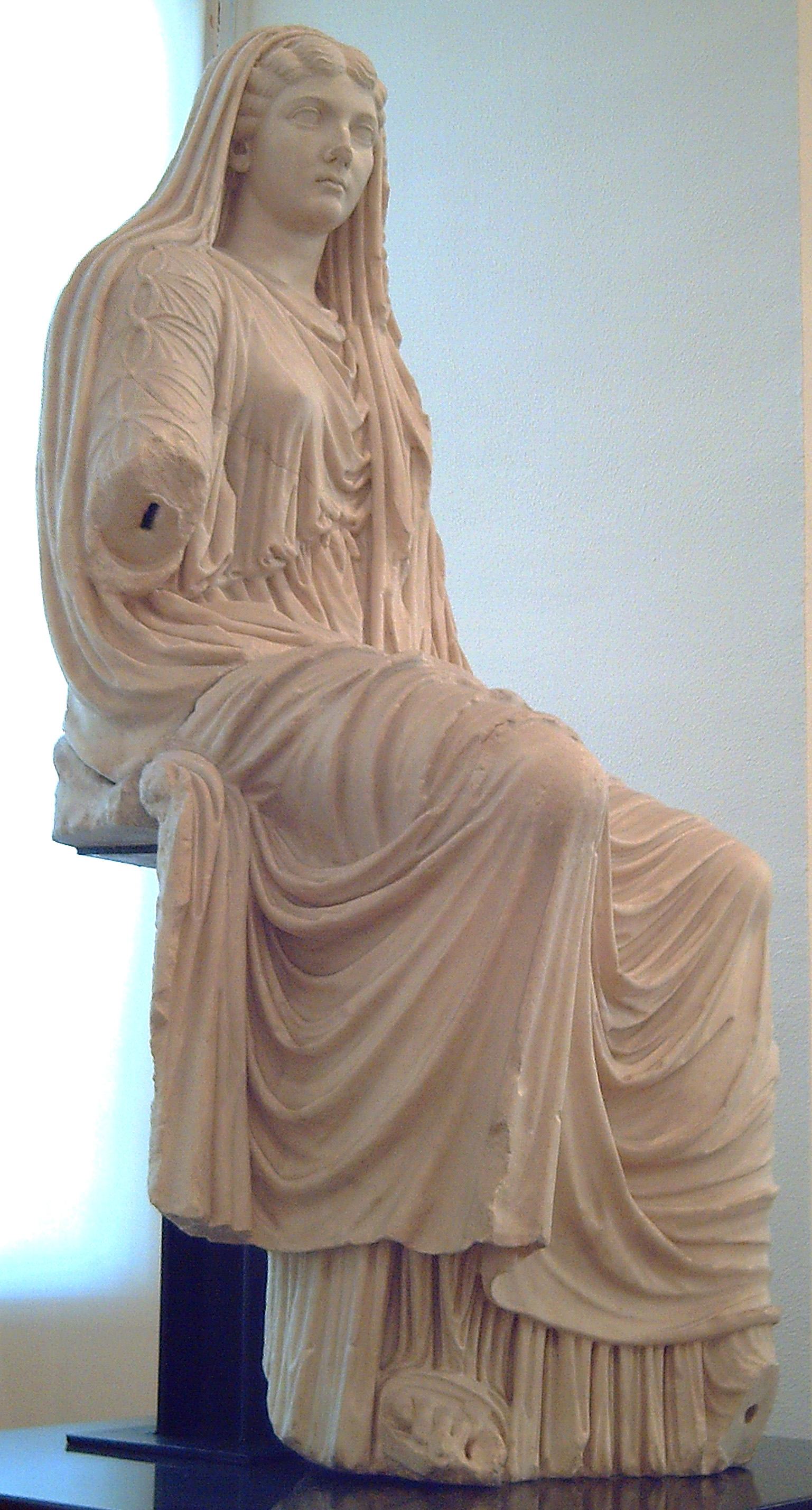
Livia Drusilla (58 BC–29 AD) wearing a stola and palla – early 1st century AD – Museo Arqueológico Nacional de España, Madrid

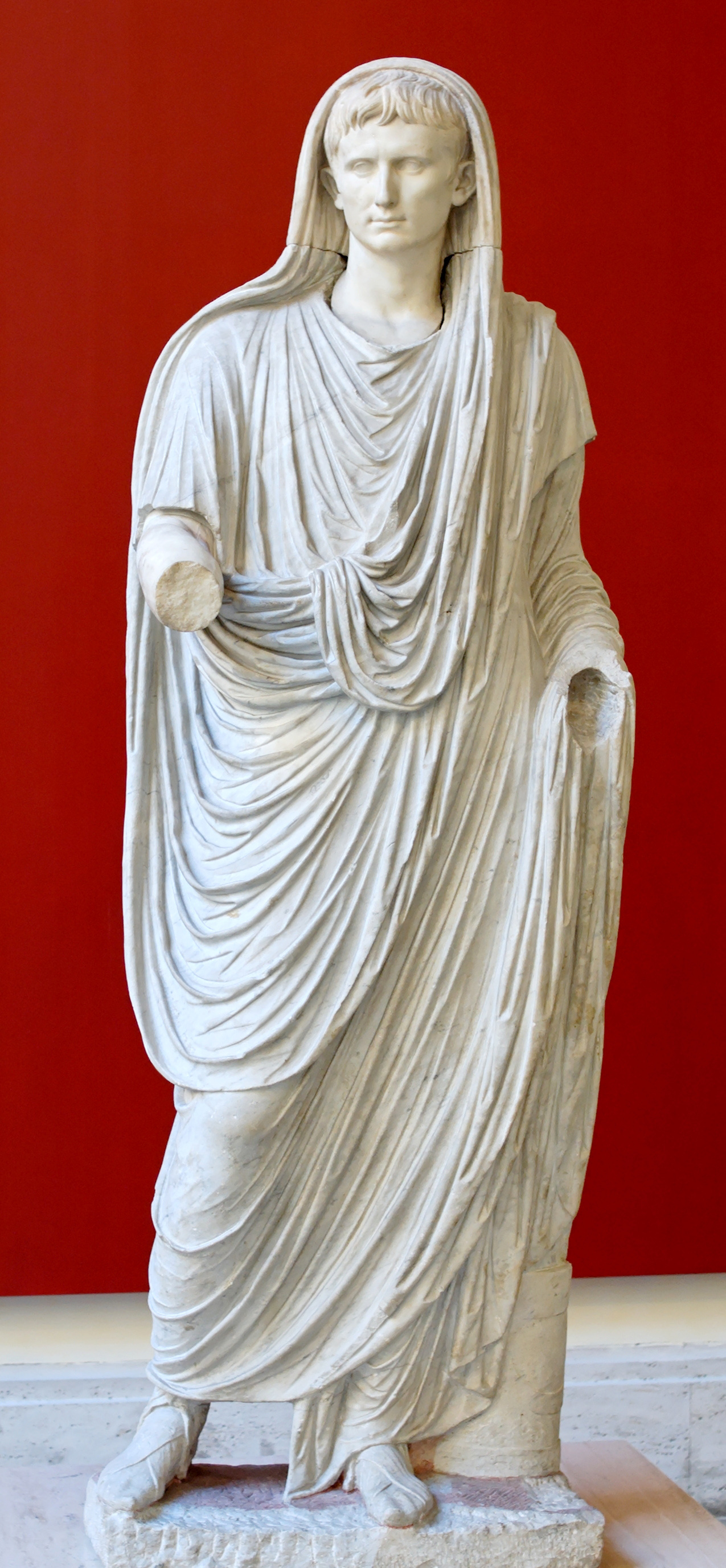
Augustus (63 BC–14 AD) wearing a toga and calcei patricii (shoes reserved for Patricians), a capsa (container for documents) lies at his feet – late 1st century AD – Museo Nazionale Romano Rome

=== Symbolism and influence ===
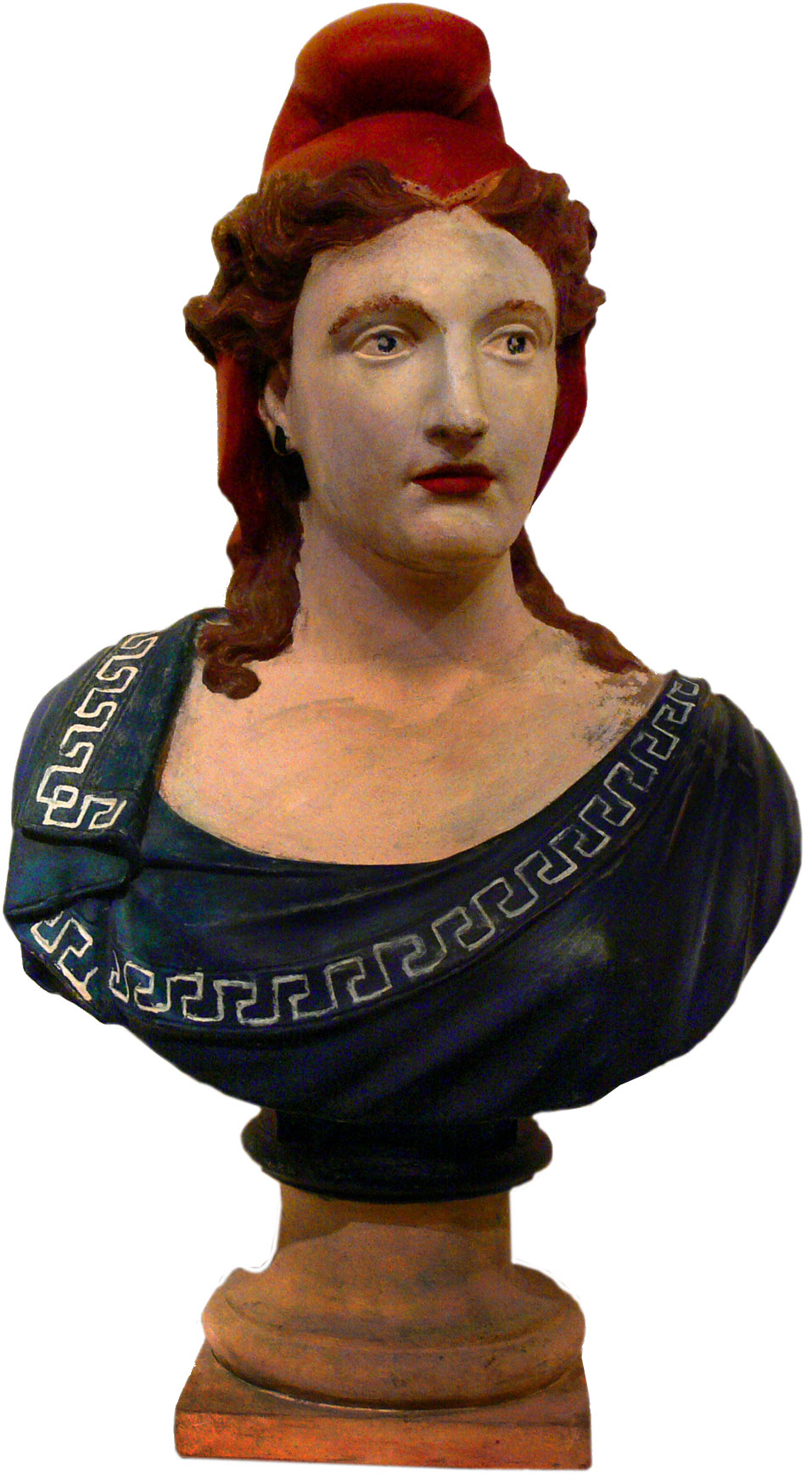
Bust of Marianne, a French national symbol, adopting a Phrygian cap in imitation of freed slaves of Rome – Palais du Luxembourg, Paris

Roman clothing took on symbolic meaning for later generations. Roman armour, particularly the muscle cuirass, has symbolized amazing power. In Europe during the Renaissance (15th and 16th centuries AD), painters and sculptors sometimes depicted rulers wearing pseudo-Roman military attire, including the cuirass, military cloak, and sandals.

Later, during the French Revolution, an effort was made to dress officials in uniforms based on the Roman toga, to symbolize the importance of citizenship to a republic. Adopted by the rank and file revolutionaries, the 18th-century AD liberty cap, a brimless, limp cap fitting snugly around the head, was based on a bonnet worn by freed slaves in ancient Rome, the Phrygian cap.

The modern Western bride also has inherited elements from ancient Roman wedding attire, such as the bridal veil and the wedding ring.

== South Asia ==
Evidence of ancient Indian clothing can be found in figurines, rock cut sculptures, cave paintings, and human art forms found in temples and monuments. These sculptures show human figures wearing clothes wrapped around the body, such as sari, turbans and dhoti. Upper classes of the society wore fine muslin and imported silk fabrics while the common classes wore locally made fabrics such as cotton, flax, wool, linen, and leather.

India was one of the first places where cotton was cultivated and used as early as 2500 BC during the Harappan Era (3300–1300 BC). Recent analysis of Harappan silk fibers in beads have shown that silk was made by the process of reeling, an art known only to China until the early centuries AD. The only evidence found for clothing is from iconography and some unearthed Harappan figurines which are usually unclothed. These little depictions show that usually men wore a long cloth wrapped over their waist and fastened it at the back (just like a close clinging dhoti). Turbans were worn, and a long robe over the left shoulder was worn by those of high social rank. The normal attire of the women at that time was a skirt up to knee length leaving the waist bare, and cotton head dresses. Jewellery was very popular, and men wore their hair in various styles with trimmed beards.

Vedic period (c. 1750 – 500 BC) garments for both sexes included a single cloth wrapped around the whole body and draped over the shoulder. A lower garment called paridhana was pleated in front and tied with a belt (mekhala), and worn with a shawl-like upper garment called uttariya. Orthodox males and females usually wore the uttariya by throwing it over the left shoulder only, in the style called upavita. The lower garment was called 'nivi' or 'nivi bandha', while the upper body was mostly left bare. In cold weather a garment called pravara was worn. Sometimes the poor people wore the lower garment as a loincloth, while the rich wore foot-length pravara to show their prestige. Vedic women mainly wore the sari, which is derived from शाटी, the Sanskrit for 'strip of cloth' śāṭī. Towards the later Vedic period, the choli and dupatta, a smaller version of sari, were introduced. The dupatta was worn with ghaghara (an ankle-length skirt). Vedic men wore lungi (a garment like a sarong and dhoti, a single cloth wrapped around the waist and legs which is still traditionally worn by men in villages. Wool, linen, silk and cotton were the main fibers used for making clothes, with woven stripes and checks. Gold jewellery remained very popular.

Evidence of clothing worn during the Maurya Empire (322–185 BC) comes from statues of yakshini, the female epitome of fertility. The most common attire of the people at that time was a lower garment called antariya, generally made of cotton, linen or muslin and decorated with gems, and fastened in a looped knot at the centre of the waist. A cloth was covered in lehenga style around the hips to form a tubular skirt. Another embellished long piece of cloth, hanging at the front and wrapped around the waist, was called patka. Mauryan Empire ladies often wore an embroidered fabric waistband with drum headed knots at the ends. As an upper garment, people's main garb was uttariya, a long scarf worn in several ways.

== Mesopotamia ==
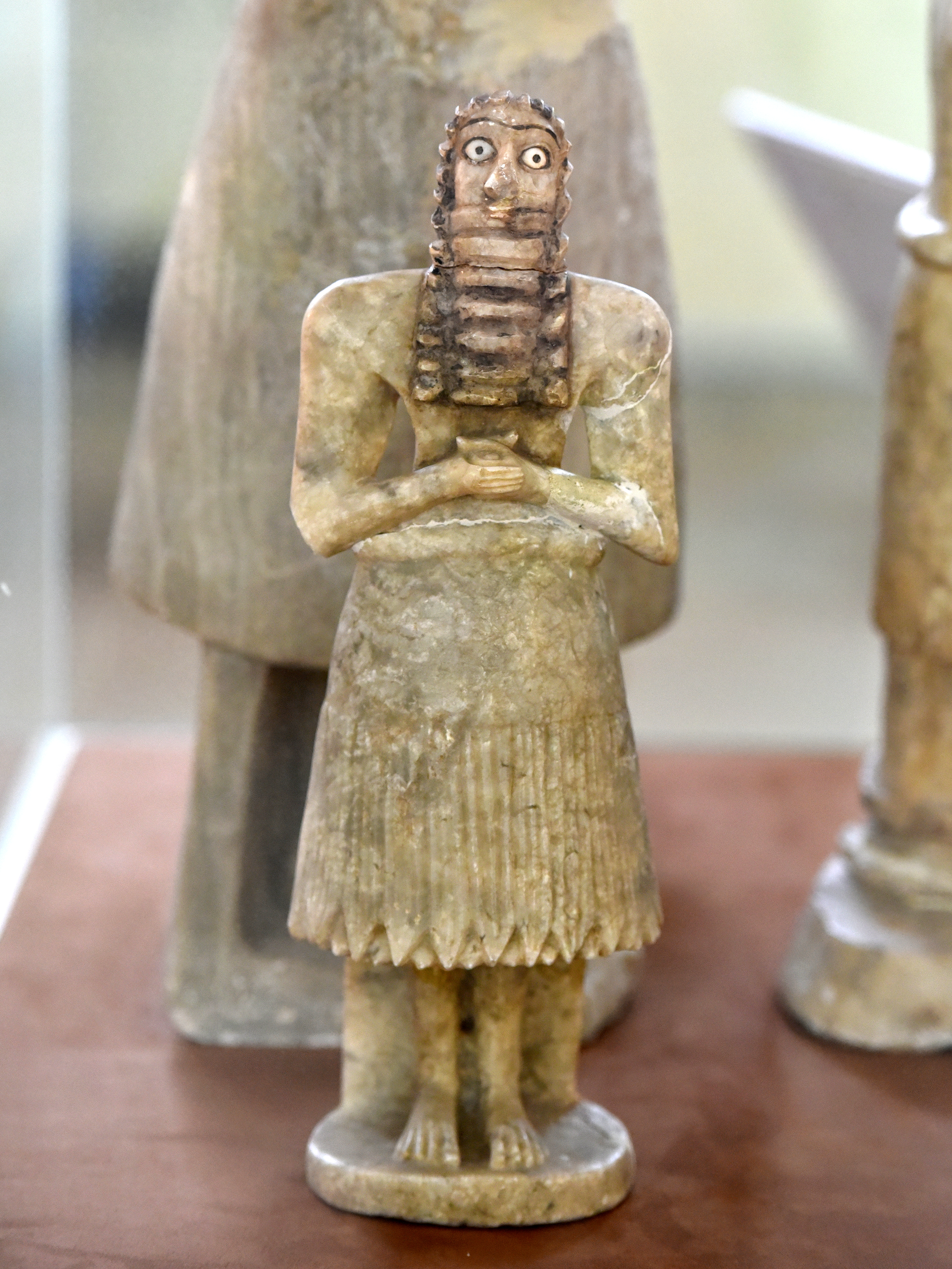
Statue of a male worshipper and the typical dress in Ancient Sumer

=== Sumer ===
From 3500-1900 BCE, the Sumerians—as a distinct people—lived in Mesopotamia. Evidence from statues and wall paintings, as well as written works help depict what society was like in that era. Society was very patriarchal and stratified by class. Wool was one of the biggest products of Ancient Sumer. Sumerian women would weave and spin the wool into textiles while the Sumerian men would dye the textiles to be different colored.

==== Kaunakes ====
Both men and women alike wore skirts or tunics called Kaunakes. Kaunakes were made out of a fleece-like textile on the exterior, and the interior was made out of sheepskin. The length of the kaunake determined hierarchal rank in society. The shorter the length of the skirt, the lower an individual was in society, i.e. slaves, soldiers, and servants. The longer the length of the skirt, the higher an individual was in society, i.e. royalty and priests.

==== Woven dress ====
Around 2370 BCE, there was a switch from the traditional non-woven dress to woven dress. This included the addition of shawls and longer fabrics that would wrap around the shoulders and waist, similar to the toga. This type of dress by the Ancient Sumerians inspired many other civilizations such as Ancient Greece, Egypt, Assyria, and Rome. For the upper class, these woven fabrics were dyed brilliant colors and decorated to show the status of an individual. Linen was a woven fabric that typically was only made for those with higher class.

==== Women's Dress ====
Women typically wore either the kaunakes or woven dresses that left their right shoulder and right arm uncovered. These fabrics were usually embroidered with some type of design to stand out. Their hair was usually left in either braids or in updos. A lot of the time, they would braid beads into their hair for special events. The princesses and high women in society typically chose to decorate themselves in the most lavish fabrics that were an array of colors. Makeup was also worn, displaying the necessity and want for color in Sumer. Women would typically wear sandals on their feet or would go barefoot if they were lower class.

==== Men's Dress ====
In the early periods of their history they would wear strings with loincloths attached. Later on, men typically wore no shirts and a kaunake. In the winter, they would wear a woven wool or flax shawl or cape. Typically kings, priests, and high officials would wear kaunakes down to the floor and these skirts would be embedded with ornaments and tassels and fringes. Men would usually wear their hair down and grow out long beards (meant to signify wisdom) that were curled artificially and treated with oils to maintain the curl. Men with higher status, especially priests, would shave their head and beards. Men would also wear sandals on their feet or go barefoot if they were lower class.

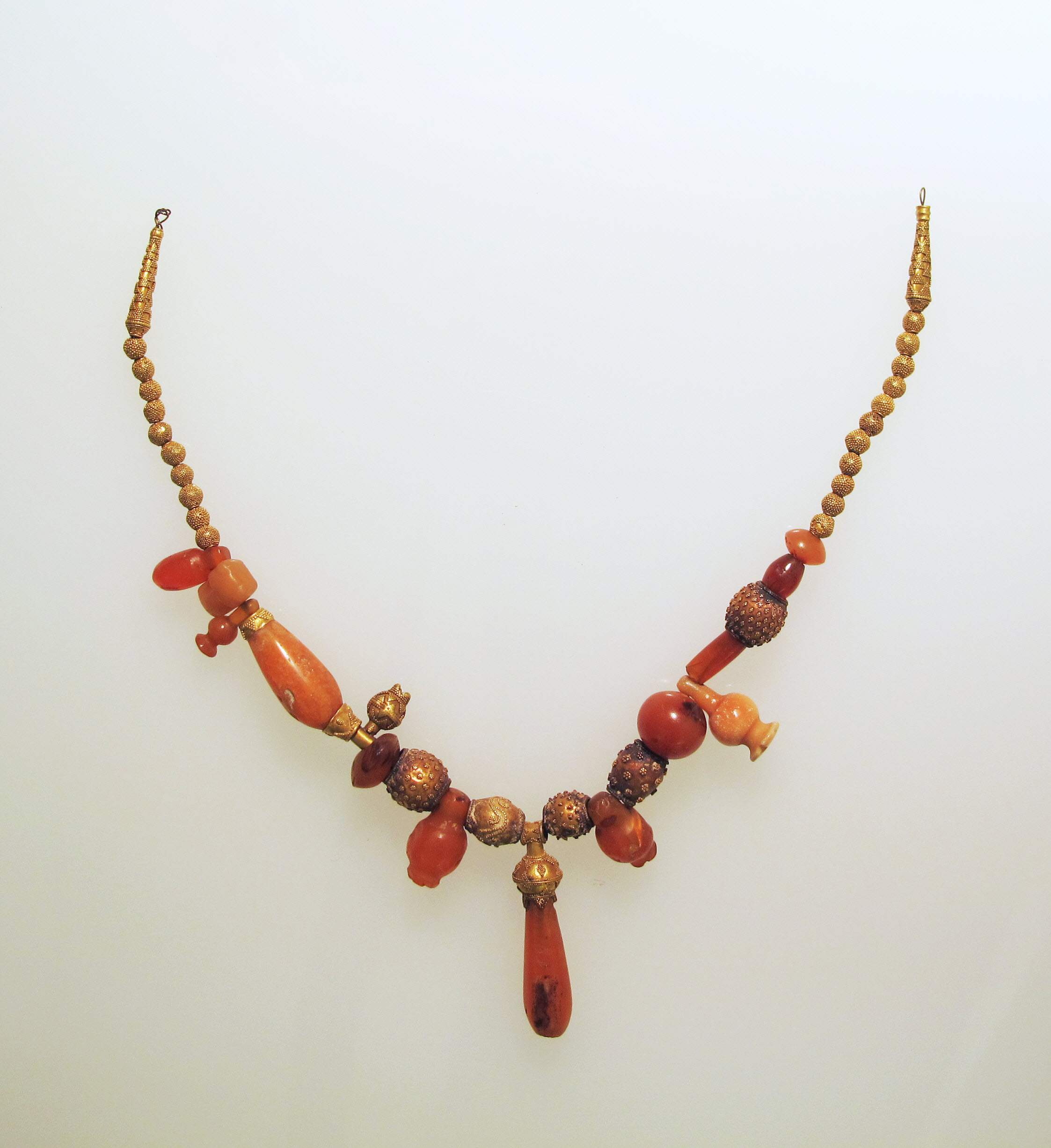
Carnelian Jewelry was used to add more color and liveliness

==== Accessories ====
Sumerian jewelry was typically made out of gold, silver, and bronze and was frequently embedded with carnelian, a reddish-orange gemstone. Accessories such as headdresses, bracelets, necklaces, and pendants were created. Jewelry was typically worn during religious celebrations. Jewelers used bronze, flowers, and beadwork as a medium.

== See also ==
- Clothing in ancient Shu
- History of clothing and textiles

== Sources ==
- Metropolitan Museum of Art
