= Chiton (garment) =

Sewn garment in Ancient Greece

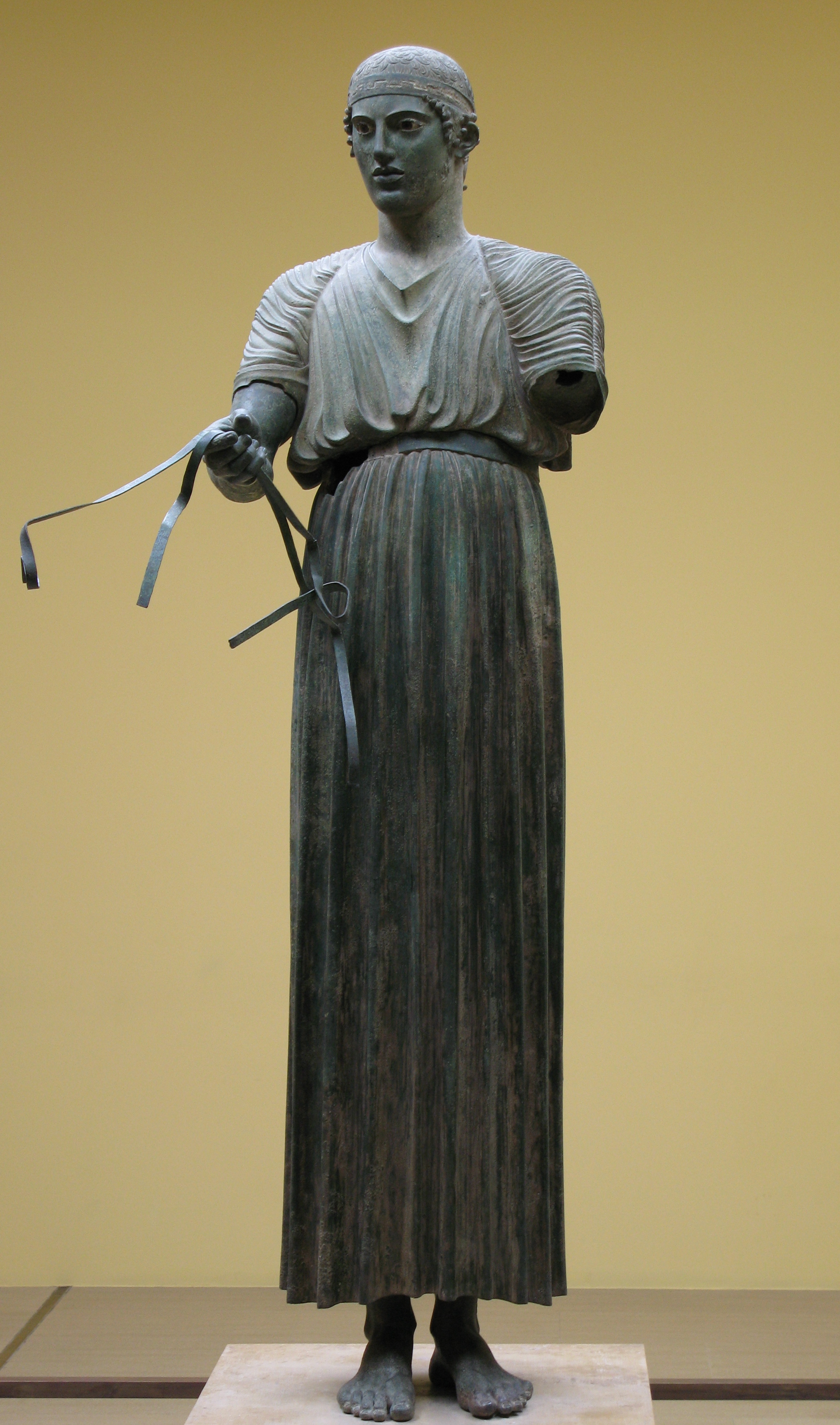
Charioteer of Delphi in an Ionic chiton

A chiton (/ˈkaɪtɒn, -tən/; Ancient Greek: χιτών, romanized: khitṓn [kʰitɔ̌ːn]) is a form of tunic that fastens at the shoulder, worn by men and women of ancient Greece and Rome. There are two forms of chiton: the Doric and the later Ionic. According to Herodotus, popular legend was that Athenian women began to wear the chiton as opposed to the peplos after several women stabbed a messenger to death with the bronze pins characteristic of the peplos.

== Etymology ==
The word chiton is derived from Ancient Greek χιτών (khitṓn, “tunic”), from a Central Semitic language *kittān (as in Maltese) from the Akkadian𒌆𒃰 (kitû, literally “flax, linen”), from Sumerian 𒄑𒃰 (kitû [GIŠ.GADA]).

== Different forms and wearing styles ==
A shorter version of the chiton was called the chitoniskos.

=== Doric chiton ===
The Doric chiton is a single rectangle of woolen or linen fabric. It can be worn plain or with an overfold called an apoptygma (ἀπόπτυγμα), which is more common to women. It can be draped and fastened at the shoulder by pins (Greek: peronai; Latin: fibulae) or sewing, or by buttons.

=== Ionic chiton ===
The Ionic chiton could also be made from linen or wool and was draped without the fold and held in place from neck to wrist by several small pins or buttons.

Herodotus states the dress of the women in Athens was changed from the Doric peplos to the Ionic chiton after the widows of the men killed on military expedition to Aegina stabbed and killed the sole survivor with their peplos pins, each demanding where their husband was. This lynching 'seemed a thing more terrible than the disaster'. Thereafter their chitons were held with buttons, often styled with the face of the Gorgon.

=== Zoster ===
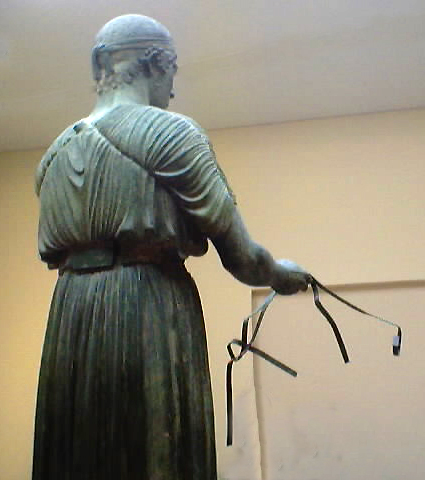
Belting of the charioteer (front view above)

A large belt called a zoster could be worn over the chiton, usually under the breast ("high-girdled") or around the waist ("low-girdled") or a narrower "zone" or girdle could be used. The chiton's length was greater than the height of the wearer, so excessive fabric was pulled above the belt, like a blouse. A double-girdled style also existed. The chiton was often worn in combination with the heavier himation over it, which had the role of a cloak.

==== Monochiton ====
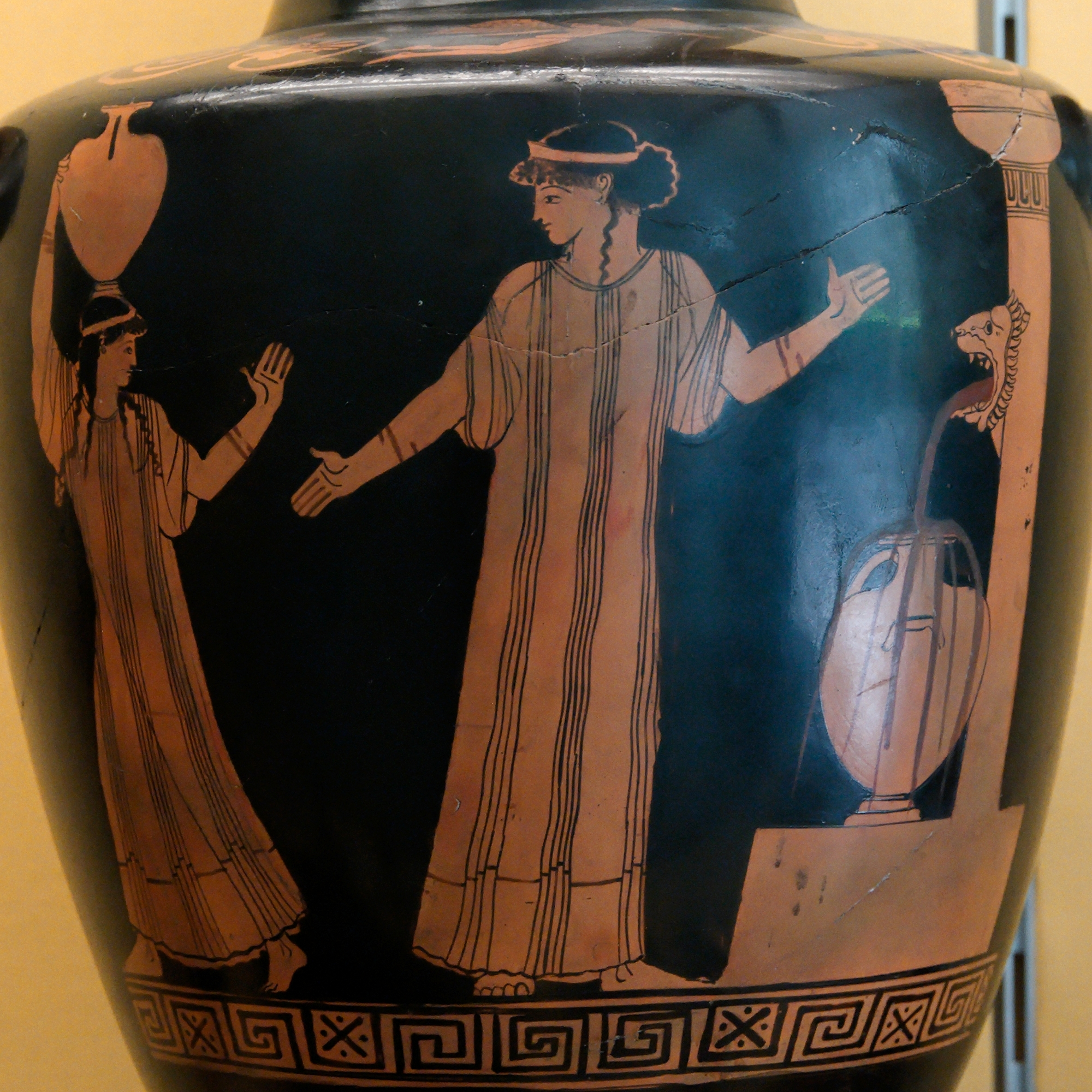
Two women wearing simple chiton poderes, without a belt or apoptygma (overfold). As they are not wearing himations, these are monochitons

When used alone (without a himation), the chiton was called a monochiton. A long chiton which reached the heels was called a chiton poderes, while a longer one which dragged the ground was called a chiton syrtos or an helkekhitōn (ἑλκεχίτων) (lit. 'a chiton that drags the ground'). A woman's chiton would always be worn at ankle length. Men wore the long chiton during the Archaic period, but later wore it at knee length, except for certain occupations such as priests and charioteers, and also the elderly.

A sleeved form was worn by priests and actors. The colour or pattern would often indicate status, but varied over time. The chiton was the outfit of Aphrodite because it was considered very feminine, although men also wore it. Dionysus is often depicted wearing it. The chiton was also worn by the Romans after the 3rd century BC. However, they referred to it as a tunica. An example of the chiton can be seen, worn by the caryatids, in the porch of the Erechtheion in Athens. A charioteer's chiton can be seen on the Charioteer of Delphi (474 BC) in the image at the beginning of the article.

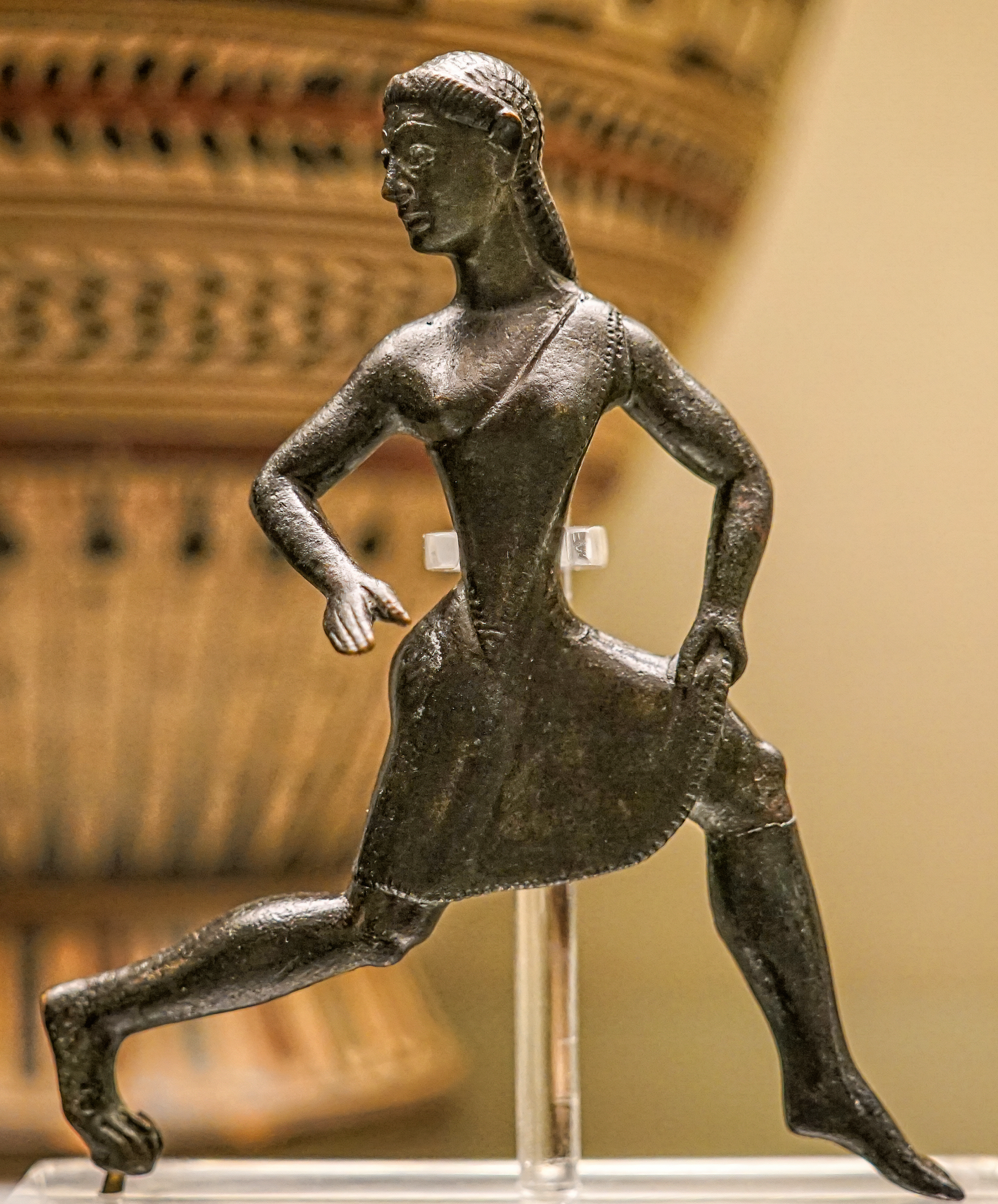
This statuette of a Laconian shows a short oneshouldered chiton.

In Sparta, Laconian women's clothing was simple and short. They wore the Dorian peplos, with slit skirts which bared their thighs. The Dorian peplos was made of a heavier woolen material than was common in Ionia, and was fastened at the shoulder by pins. When running races, Spartan girls wore a distinctive single-shouldered knee-length chiton.

== See also ==
- Clothing in the ancient world
  - Clothing in ancient Greece
- Exomis
- Raglan sleeve
- Seamless robe of Jesus, sometimes called the "Holy Chiton"
- Stephane (Ancient Greece)
- Toga

== Sources ==
- Pomeroy, Sarah B. (1994), Goddesses, Whores, Wives and Slaves: Women in Classical Antiquity, London: Pimlico, ISBN 978-0-712-66054-9
- Pomeroy, Sarah (2002), Spartan Women, Oxford: Oxford University Press, ISBN 0-195-13067-7
- "Chiton" Encyclopædia Britannica
- Garland, Robert (2008), Ancient Greece Everyday Life in the Birthplace of Western Civilization, New York: Sterling Press, ISBN 978-1-4549-0908-8
- Radicke, Jan (2022), Roman Women's Dress, Berlin: De Gruyter, ISBN 978-3-11-071155-4
