= Waist cincher =

Type of corset (garment)

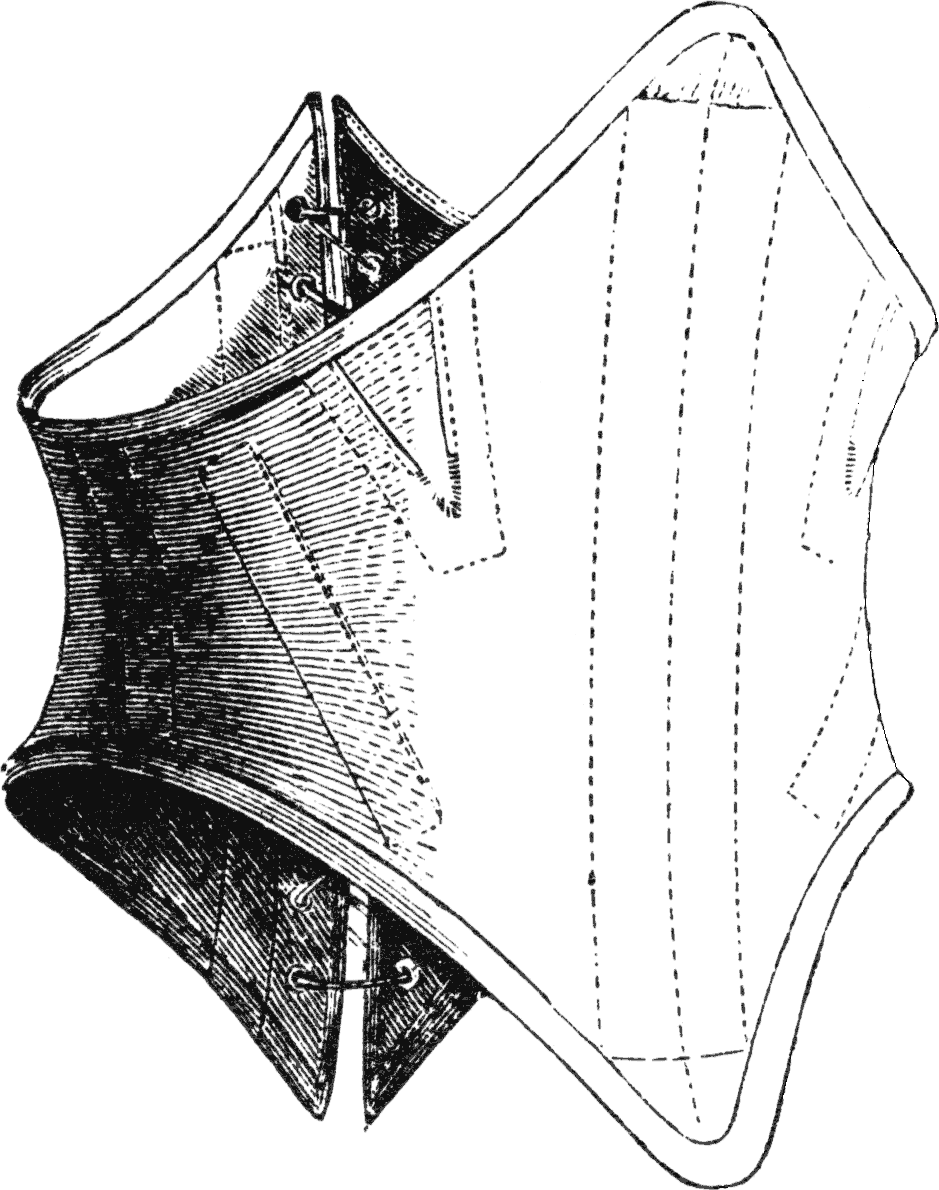
A short corset, 1860, of one part.

A waist cincher (sometimes referred to as a waspie) is a belt worn around the waist to make the wearer's waist physically smaller, or to create the illusion of being smaller.

== Today ==
Waist cinchers and waspies from the 1980s are a type of wide, laced belts with elastic fabric and soft plastic stiffeners.

== Ribbon corset ==
The ribbon corset is made of pieces of ribbon, as opposed to fabric. In 1901, a simple pattern of silk ribbon, two bones, and a busk was available, allowing women to construct their own ribbon corsets.

A pseudo-ribbon corset looks like a ribbon corset but is made from cut cloth instead of ribbons. The outside seam of the cut cloth is sewn fine, while the tight inside seam is sewn plain and curved.

== Function ==
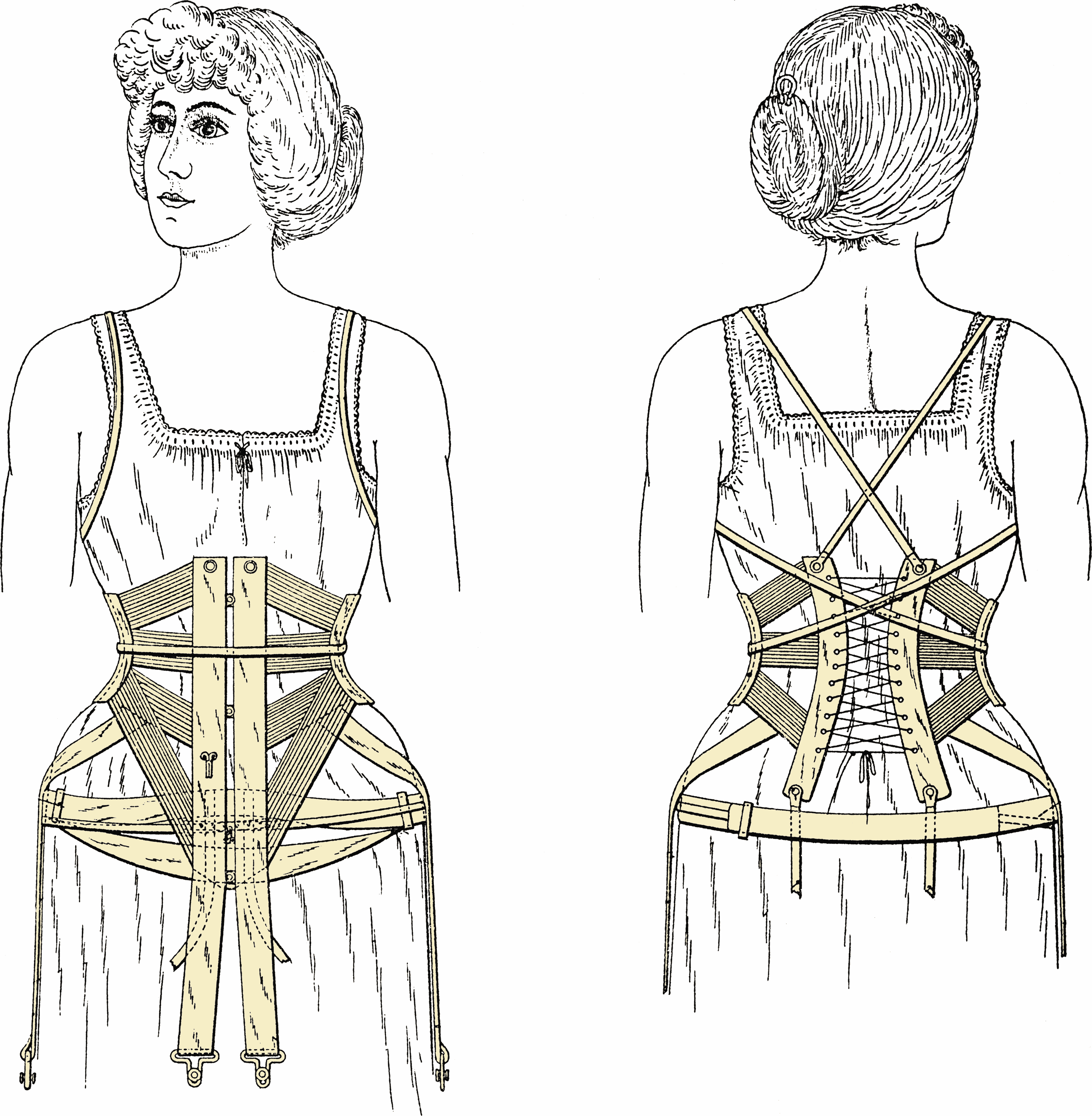
A short corset from 1906

Short corsets have been used as light corsets for sleeping or light corsets that may be used next to the skin or over clothing. There are also elastic girdle belt styles that have been used on the inside of shape-enhancing garments, on their own as shapeware (items designed to be worn under and not be visible that help smooth, shape the figure to improve look of the wearer.)

There are a number of modern fashions that resemble the styles of the past, from wide elastic belts to actual modern corsets. The trend and styling of these belts moves rather quickly but the basic design remains the same: elastic in the back with some sort of closure in the front meant to define the waist or accent an outfit.

The more traditional boned styles of corset still exist in modern corset making. The corset styles that best represent this classic waist cincher fashion are 'Spanish belts' that can also come with elastic in the back, and act very much like the more modern belt-like styles.

More classic corset styles from which lighter corsets have adopted their fit and function are still available. They work basically the same way as the elastic and lighter styles, accenting an outfit or defining a waist, but they also offer better back support. Some serve as a fashionable alternative to certain kinds of medical back braces; these styles include the 'French underbust' and the 'long line underbust'.

== The "New Look" ==
Dior's "New Look" brought the waist cincher to popularity around 1947. In his autobiography, Dior wrote: "I designed clothes for flower-like women, with rounded shoulders, full feminine busts, and hand-span waists above enormous spreading skirts".

The hand-span waists so beloved by Dior were achieved by foundation garments, of which the most popular was the waist cincher. Called the "waspie" or "guepiere", it became the quintessential undergarment of the "New Look". Boned and back-laced, it differed from the Victorian corset of decades past primarily in its length, usually only 6 to 7 inches. Fashion magazines of the time stressed that it was "super-light weight" and contained "feather boning". Such garments were worn tightly cinched at the waist, usually over a girdle. The combination was described by Anne Fogarty, an American dress designer who popularized the "New Look" in the US: "To maintain your figure at its flattering best, depend on foundation garments to control and distribute; a cinch or tight belt to restrain."

== Examples and similar corsets and belts ==
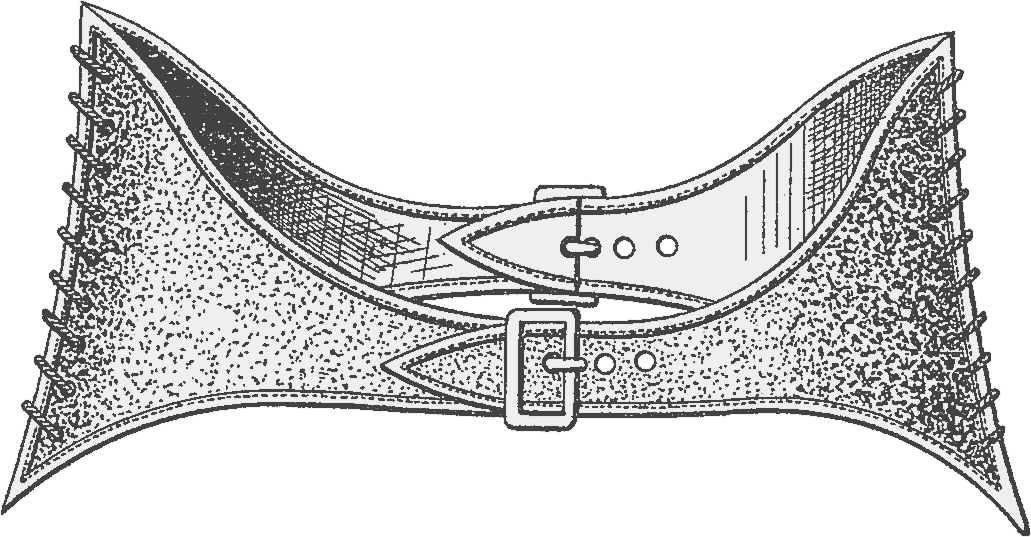
Bodice Belt
(1893)

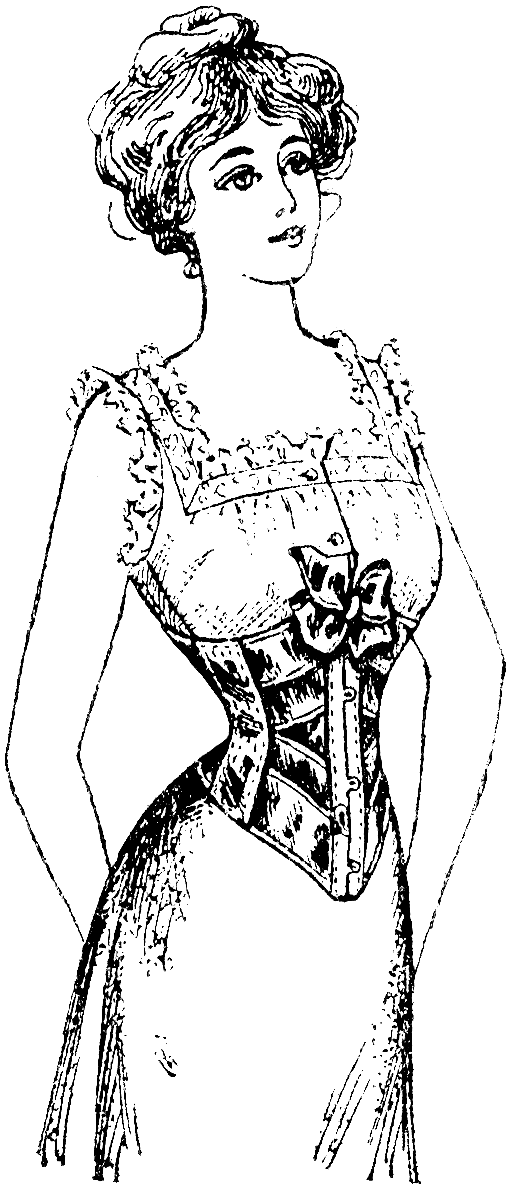
Straight-front short corset of ribbon, named Ribbon Corset, circa 1901.
(concealed underwear 1901-1908)

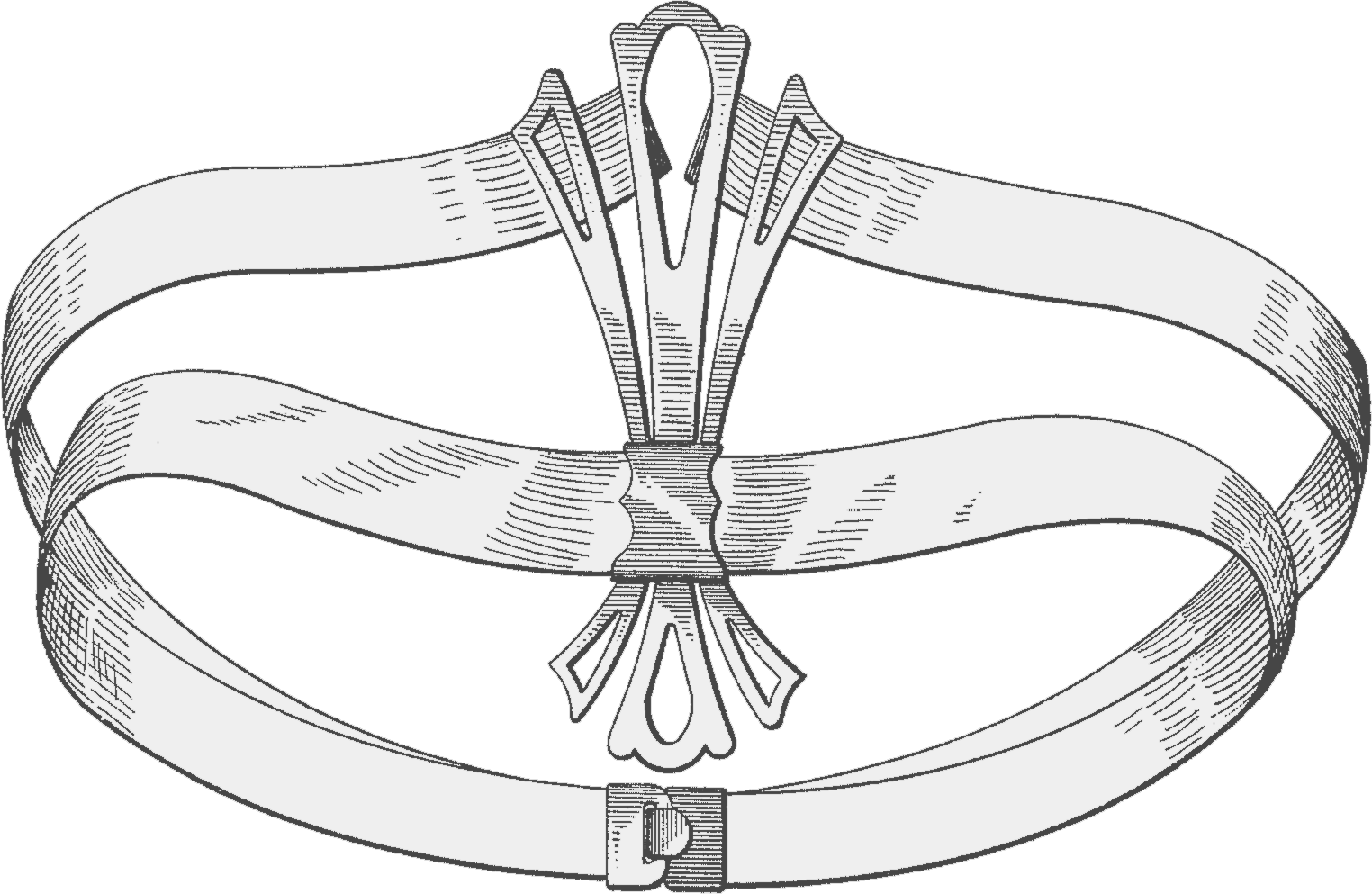
Lady's belt, something between belt and waist cincher
(visible 1902)

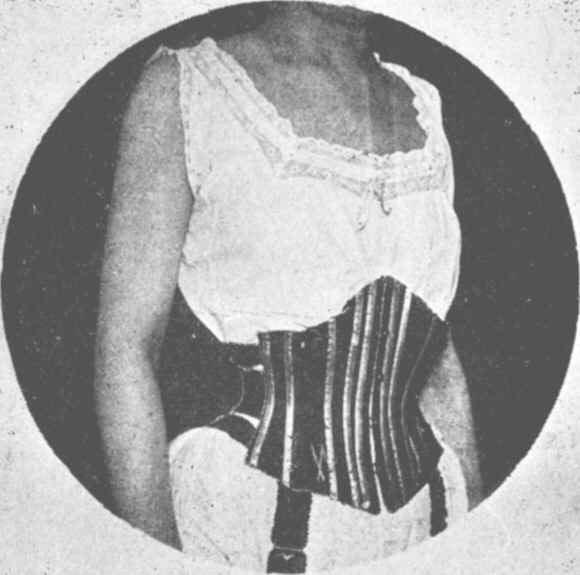
A Waist Cincher for rest.
(concealed underwear c. 1905)

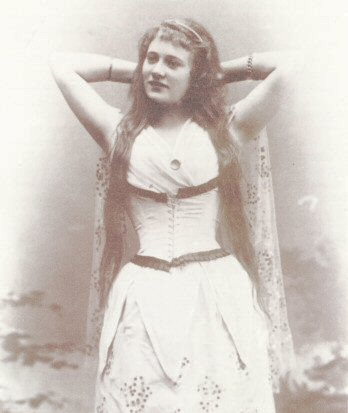
A Waist Cincher for a singer's costume.
(visible c. 1905)

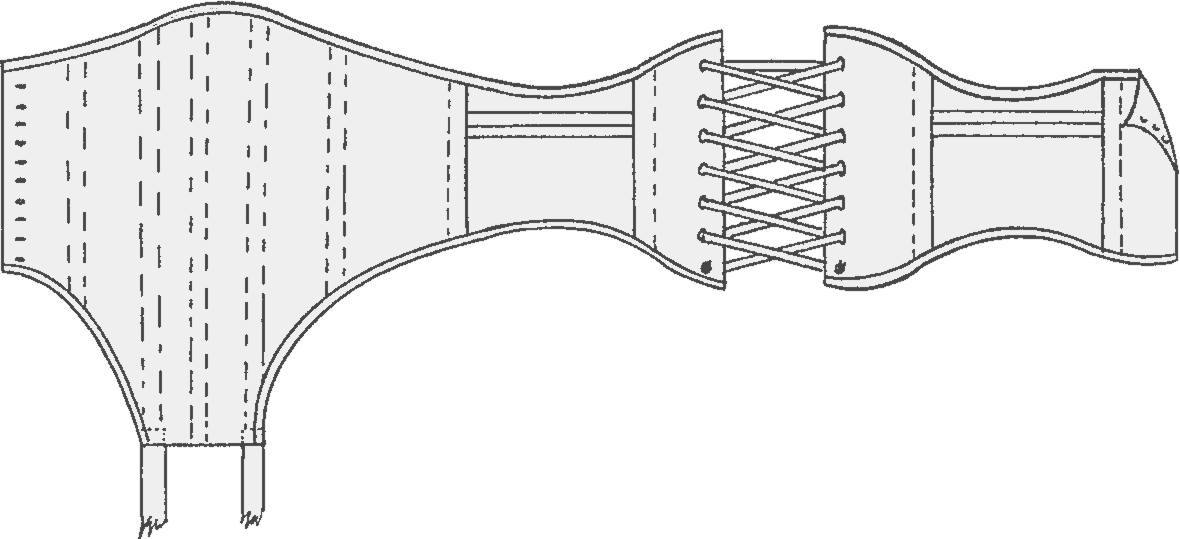
Belt Corset
(concealed underwear 1920)

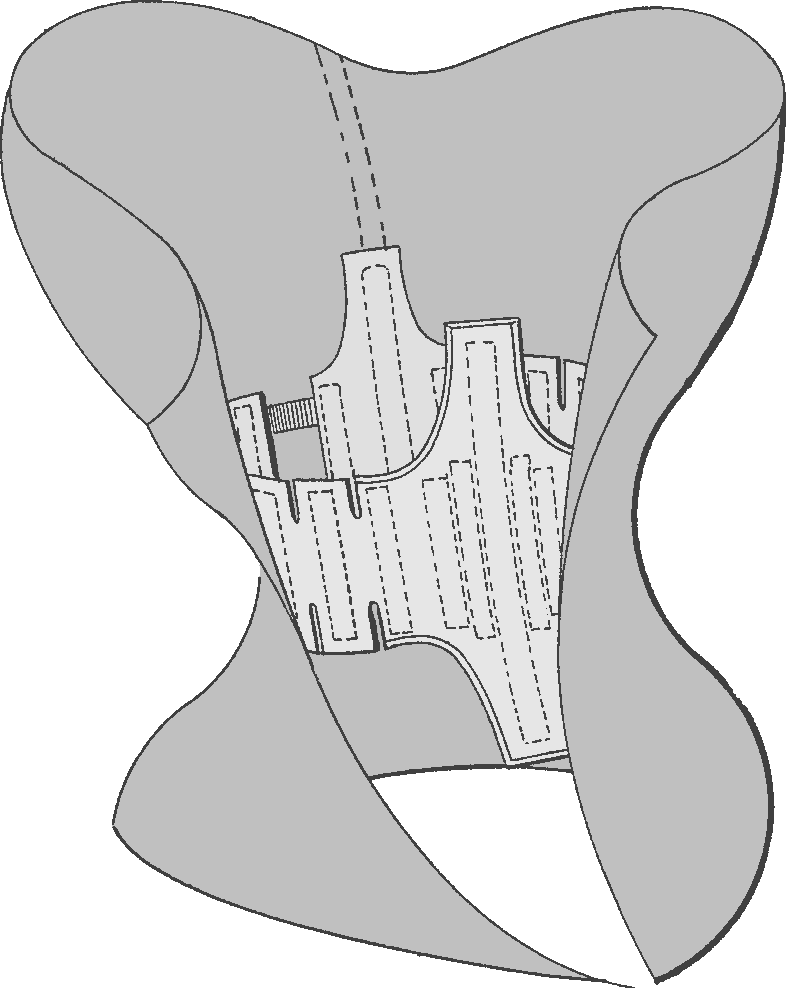
Inner Belt in corset, concealed underwear, but the same principle as a Waist cincher
(1890)

== See also ==
- Corset controversy
- Waist chain
