= Zoster (costume) =

Soldier's belt, later a woman's girdle, in Ancient Greece

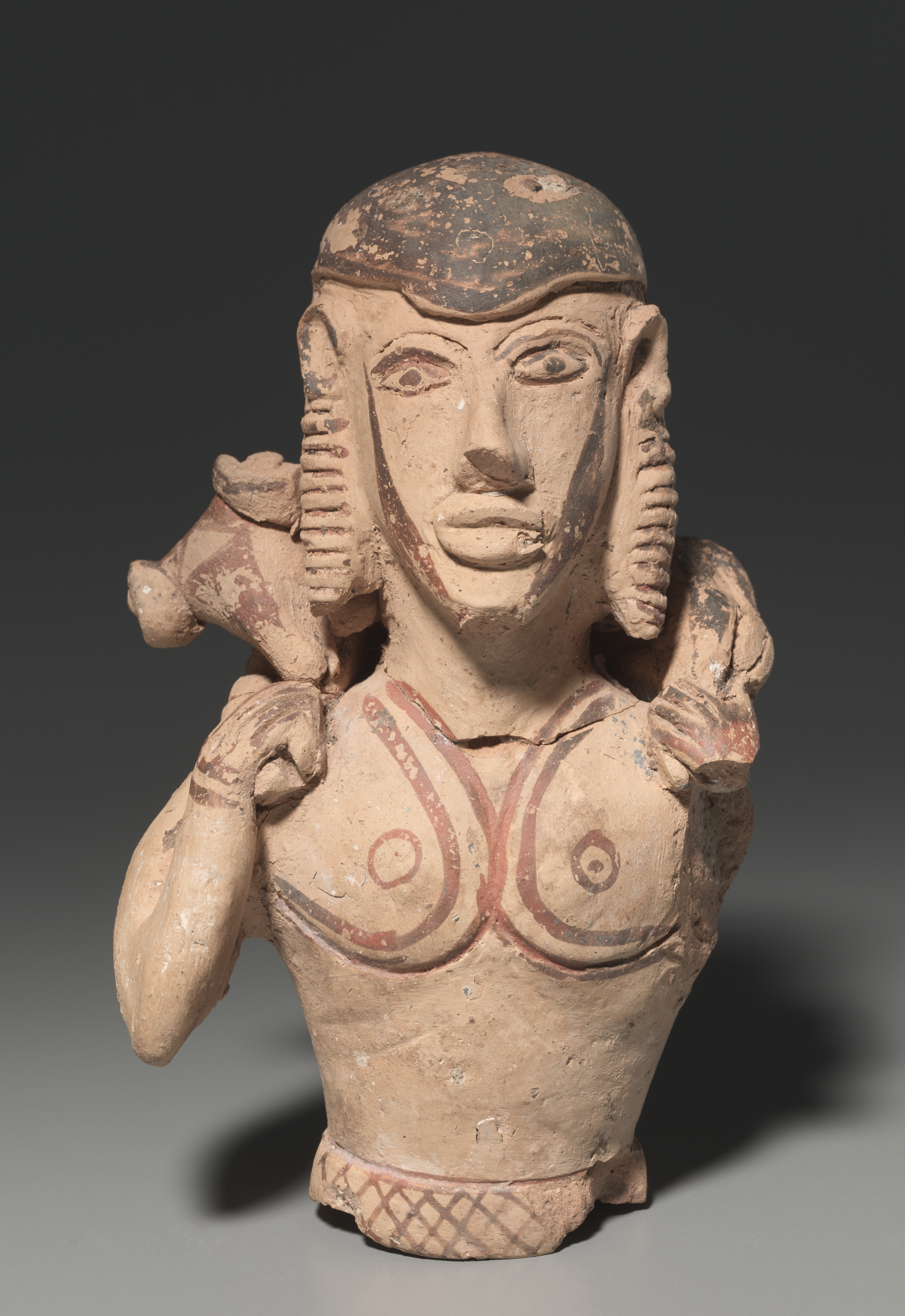
Terracotta figure of Kriophoros wearing a zoster (c. 650 BC)

A zoster (Greek: ζωστήρ, zōstēr) was a form of girdle or belt worn by men and perhaps later by women in ancient Greece, from the Archaic period (c. 750 – c. 500 BC) to the Hellenistic period (323–30 BC).

The word occurs in Homer, where it appears to refer to a warrior's belt of leather, possibly covered in bronze plates. Later references in the late Archaic and early Classical periods show it used as a belt or cloth girdle with men's clothes, especially the shorter chiton.

The word is also used in the 9th labour of Heracles/Hercules, where he must steal Hippolyta's zoster, although in translation the word girdle is preferred. In this myth the word is used as war belt rather than just a piece of clothing.

There are also zosteres in Nausicaa's wardrobe, when she goes out to do her laundry, so as to encounter Odysseus (6:38). It's not clear whether her zoster is a form of underwear of just a linen belt over her peplos.

By the Hellenistic period, it had become synonymous with "zone" and was used for women's clothes as well as men's.

The zoster was also worn and is still worn by Greeks when wearing traditional costumes (regional clothing).

== See also ==
- Clothing in ancient Greece
