= Patka (disambiguation) =

Patka is a smaller version of the full Sikh turban.

Patka may refer to:

- A style or synonym of katzeb
- A style or synonym of izarband
- Pátka, village in Hungary
- Pätkä from the Finnish comedy film series Pekka and Pätkä played by Masa Niemi
- Juhana Tuomas "Pätkä" Rantala, musician from the Finnish band HIM (Finnish band)
