= Clothing in ancient Greece =

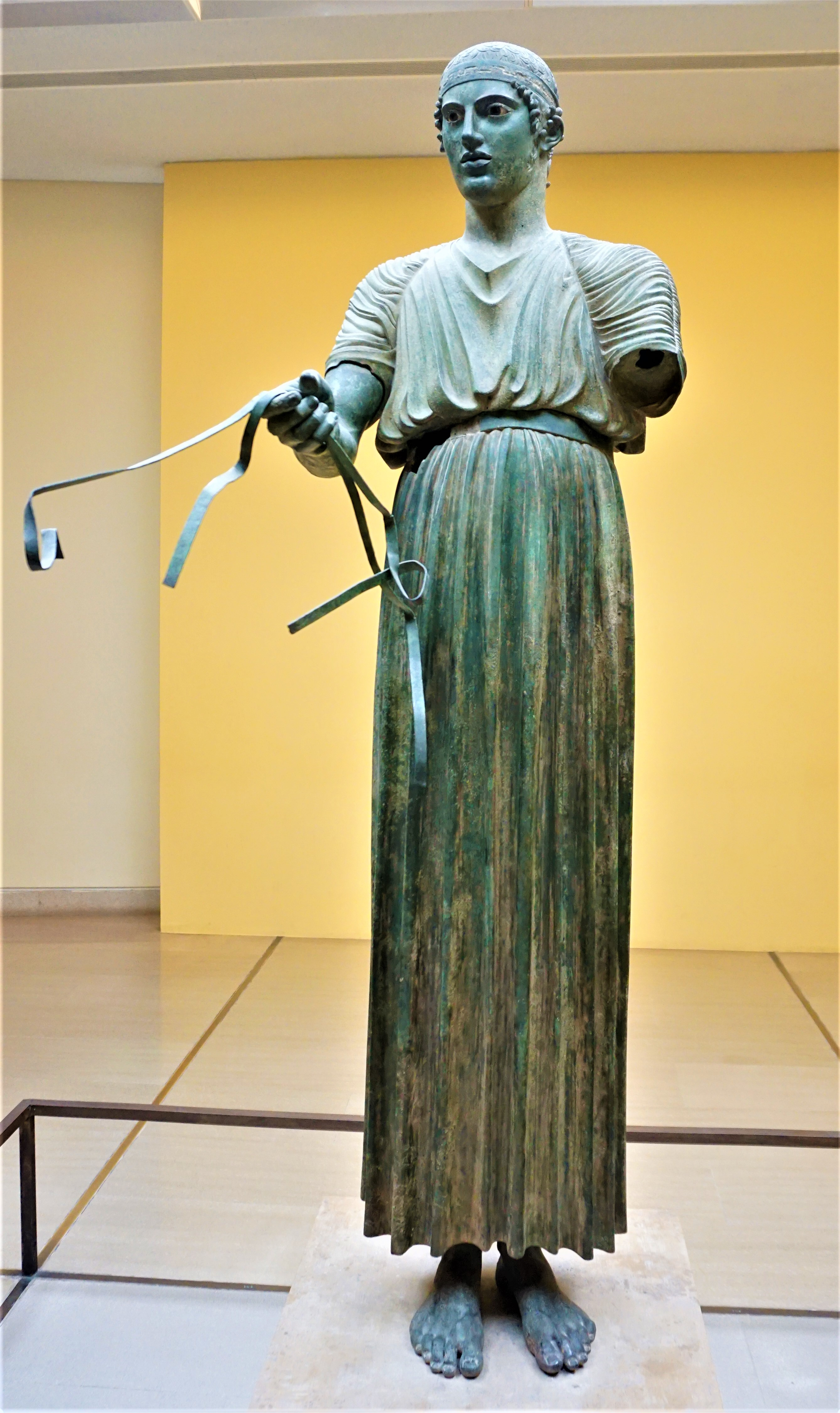
Charioteer of Delphi wearing a chiton.

Clothing in ancient Greece refers to clothing starting from the Aegean bronze age (3000 BCE) to the Hellenistic period (31 BCE). Clothing in ancient Greece included a wide variety of styles but primarily consisted of the chiton, peplos, himation, and chlamys. Ancient Greek civilians typically wore two pieces of clothing draped about the body: an undergarment (χιτών : chitōn or πέπλος : péplos) and a cloak (ἱμάτιον : himátion or χλαμύς : chlamýs). The people of ancient Greece had many factors (political, economic, social, and cultural) that determined what they wore and when they wore it.

Clothes were quite simple, draped, loose-fitting and free-flowing. Customarily, clothing was homemade and cut to various lengths of rectangular linen or wool fabric with minimal cutting or sewing, and secured with ornamental clasps or pins, and a belt, or girdle (ζώνη: zōnē). Pieces were generally interchangeable between men and women. However, women usually wore their robes to their ankles while men generally wore theirs to their knees depending on the occasion and circumstance. Additionally, clothing often served many purposes other than just being used as clothes such as bedding or a shroud.

In ancient Greece the terms ἀκεστής (male) and ἀκέστρια (female) were used for people who patched and restored clothing.

The shoemakers had two kind of knives for cutting leather, the σμίλη or σμιλίον, which has a straight blade and the τομεὺς or περιτομεύς, which had a crescent shaped blade.

== Textiles ==
Small fragments of textiles have been found from this period at archaeological sites across Greece. These found textiles, along with literary descriptions, artistic depictions, modern ethnography, and experimental archaeology, have led to a greater understanding of ancient Greek textiles. Clothes in ancient Greece were mainly homemade or locally made.^{[} Linen was the most common fabric worn by both sexes until it was rejected by the men for more 'moderate clothes', as those worn by the Spartans. Wool was worn because of its warmth and ability to be dyed, unlike linen. Silk was also used for the production of clothing, though for ceremonial purposes by the wealthy. In Aristotle's The History of Animals, Aristotle talks about the collection of caterpillar cocoons to be used to create silk. There is a lot of writing from ancient Greece discussing the use of silk because it was nearly transparent, revealing the body of the person wearing it, and, therefore, perfect for women to wear. Sindon (σινδών) was a fine, lightweight cloth used for summer clothing.

Amorgina (τὰ Ἀμόργινα; singular: Ἀμόργινον), were fine, muslin-like fabrics made from amorgis (ἀμοργίς), a particular type of flax. This flax, named after the island of Amorgos, but was also grown in other regions. The fabrics produced from it were highly prized for their fine texture, being even finer than byssos (βύσσος; usually applied to linen, but sometimes to very fine cotton) and karpasos (κάρπασος; cotton (Strabo even applies it to silk)). These fabrics were almost transparent and very costly, as noted in various ancient texts. The use of the adjective ἀμοργινὸς (amorginos) in reference to these fabrics can sometimes cause confusion, as it is not always clear whether the term refers to the island of Amorgos or the flax itself.

Cilicia (Κιλίκια) was called a coarse, thick cloth woven from the hair of Cilician goats, valued for its toughness and density. It was used both for garments and for protective screens in military contexts, where it could resist arrows and fire, and later became known in Latin as cilicium, the rough material used for hairshirts.

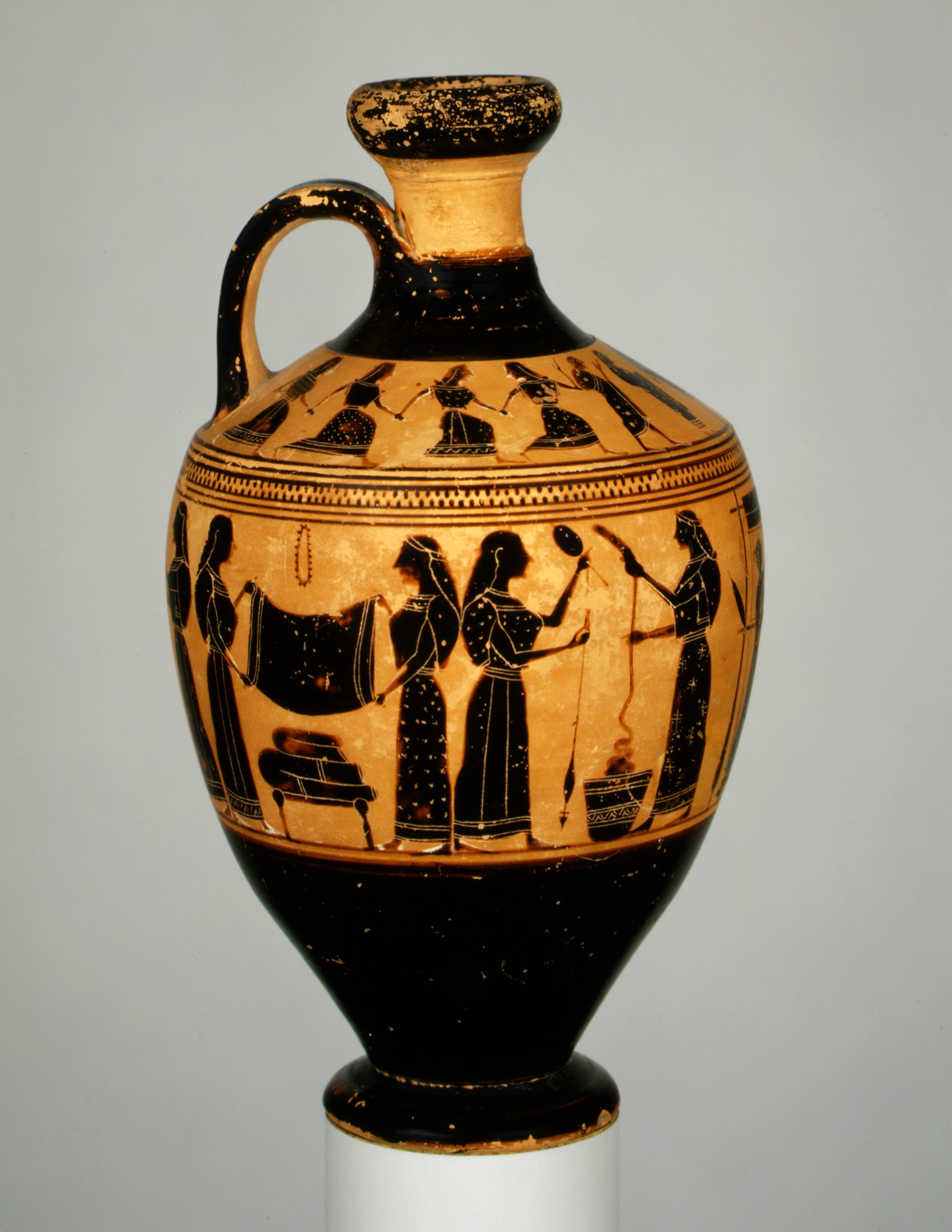
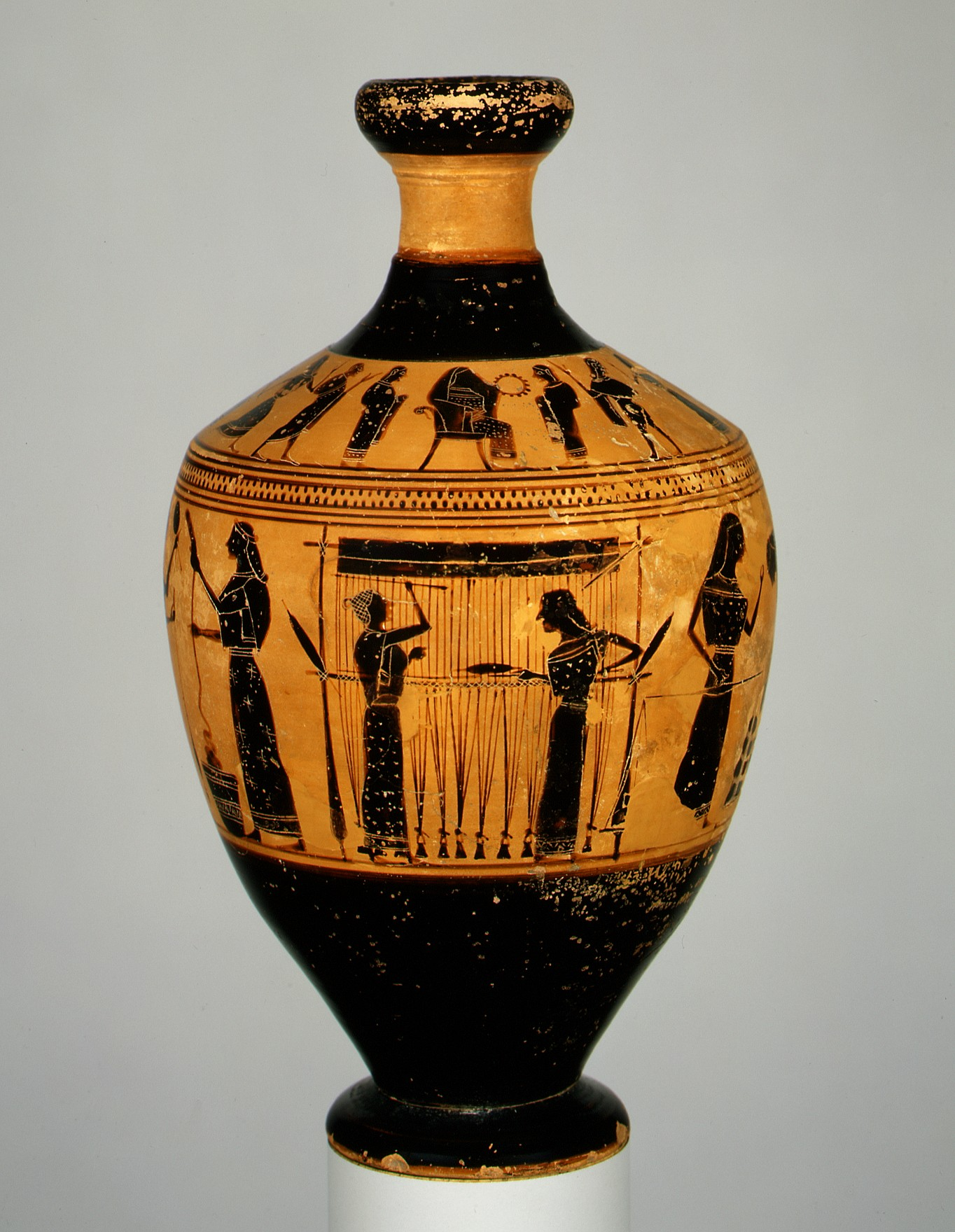
In ancient Greece, textile manufacture was largely the responsibility of women. On this lekythos attributed to the Amasis painter, women are shown folding cloth, spinning wool into yarn, and weaving cloth on an upright loom.

=== Production process ===
In the production of textiles, upright warp-weighted loom were used to weave clothing in Ancient Greece.

These looms had vertical threads or warps that were held down by loom weights. The use of looms can be seen in Homer's Odyssey when Hermes comes across Calypso weaving on a loom. Another example of the loom in Homer's Odyssey can be seen when Odysseus comes across Circe for the first time. The use of looms can also be seen being depicted on ancient Greek pottery.

=== Color and decoration ===
Clothing in ancient Greece has been found to be quite colorful with a wide variety of hues. Colors found to be used include black, red, yellow, blue, green, and purple. Yellow dyed clothing has been found to be associated with a woman's life cycle. The elite typically wore purple as a sign of wealth and money as it was the most expensive dye due to the difficulty in acquiring it. The ancient Greeks also embroidered designs into their clothes as a form of decoration. The designs embroidered included representations of florals patterns and geometric patterns as well intricate scenes from Greek stories. An example of this embroidery can be seen in Homer's Iliad where Helen is described as wearing a purple textile on which she embroidered a scene of Trojans in battle.

There was the proverbial phrase Θετταλικαὶ πτέρυγες, meaning Thessalian wings, because the Thessalian cloaks had a small flap in each side which resemble wings.

== Styles of clothing ==
The epiblema (ἐπίβλημα), periblema (περίβλημα), amfelone (ἀμφελόνη) were general terms for the outer clothing while the endyma (ἔνδυμα) was most often applied to the underclothing. The lope (λώπη) and lopos (λῶπος) were also general terms referring to the mantle. Speiron (σπεῖρον) was a term referring to a piece of cloth, garment or ragged fabric.

Hemipharion (Ἡμιφάριον) was the half of an outer-garment, but the spelling of this rare and late noun varies across lexicons, with some offering hemipharion, while others suggest hemiphorion (ἡμιφόριον) or hemiphoreion (ἡμιφόρειον), yet none can settle on a definitive form.

Paryfi (παρυφή), was the border of a tunic or a scarf, primarily in women's clothing.

Doriazein (Δωριάζειν), literally meaning "to dress like a Dorian girl," was a phrase used to describe the practice of being half-naked. This stemmed from the Dorian custom where girls would reveal their bodies at the side, as they typically wore chitons without girdles. In Sparta, however, it was not uncommon even for maidens to appear completely naked. This is how the Suda describes it.

In addition to tunics that had sleeves sewn onto them and were known as chiridota, sleeves were also worn as separate garments, not attached to the tunic.

The poderes or poderis (ποδήρης) is described as a long garment reaching down to the ankles.

Ζῶσμα φατεινόν and ζῶμα φαεῖνον were brightly-colored garments, their name coming from the verb ζώννυμαι ("to gird"). Some sources identify them with a tunic (χιτῶνα), others with a corslet (θώρακα) and others treat them strictly as a girdle or sash (ζῶσμα). Roman light-armed troops each wore a surcoat (ἐφαπτίδα) and kilts (ζώματα) around the thighs.

=== Staple garments ===
==== Chiton ====
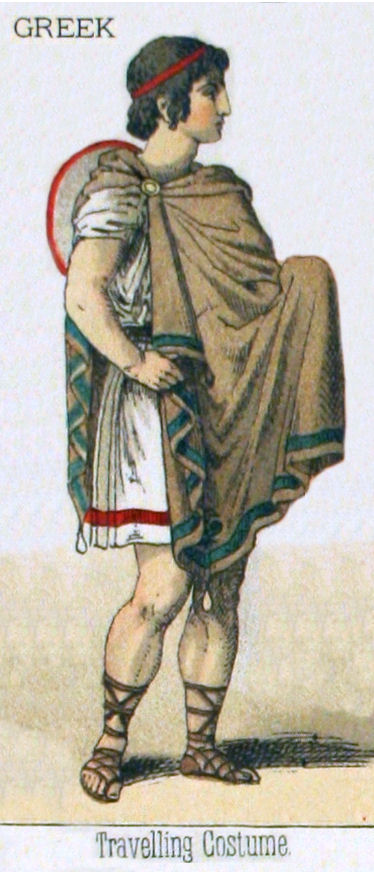
Greek travelling costume, incorporating a chiton, a chlamys, sandals, and a petasos hat hanging in the back

The chiton (plural: chitones) was a garment of light linen consisting of sleeves and long hemline. It consisted of a wide, rectangular tube of material secured along the shoulders and lower arms by a series of fasteners. The chiton was commonly worn by both men and women but the time period in which each did so depended. Chitons typically fell to the ankles of the wearer, but shorter chitons were sometimes worn during vigorous activities by athletes, warriors, or slaves.

Often excess fabric would be pulled over a girdle, or belt, which was fastened around the waist (see kolpos). To deal with the bulk sometimes a strap, or anamaschalister was worn around the neck, brought under the armpits, crossed in the back, and tied in the front. A himation, or cloak, could be worn over top of the chiton.

Διαφανῆ χιτώνια, means "see-through, thin chitons", were garments through which women's bodies were visible.

==== Chlamys ====
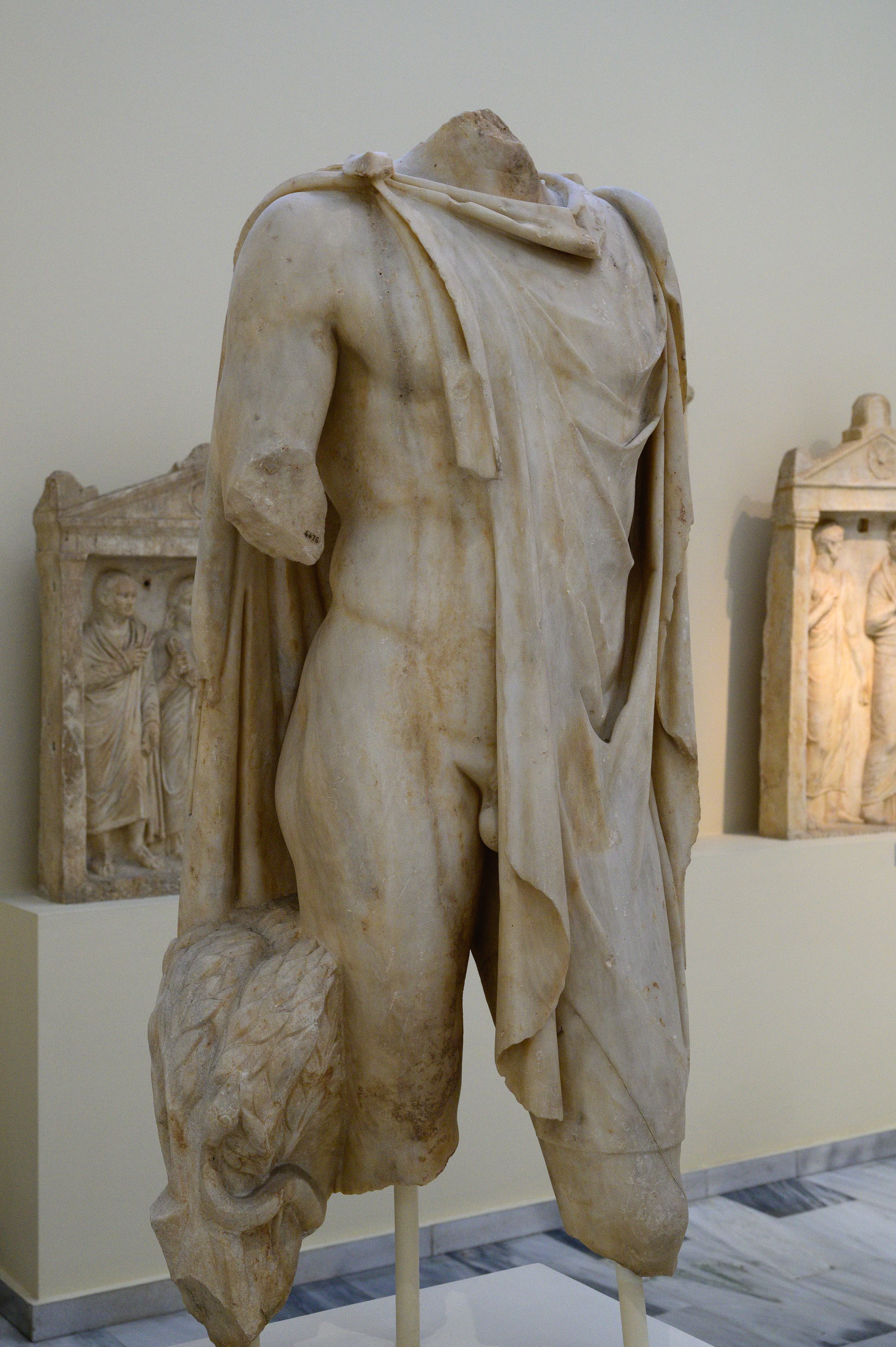
Statue of a youth wearing a chlamys. Pentelic marble, late 1st century BC - early 1st century AD. Found in Athens, probably a funerary statue. NAMA 4476.

The chlamys was a seamless rectangle of woolen material worn by men for military or hunting purposes. It was worn as a cloak and fastened at the right shoulder with a brooch or button.

The chlamys was typical Greek military attire from the 5th to the 3rd century BC. It is thought that the chlamys could ward against light attacks in war.

The chlamys went on to become popular in the Byzantine Empire by the high class and wealthy.

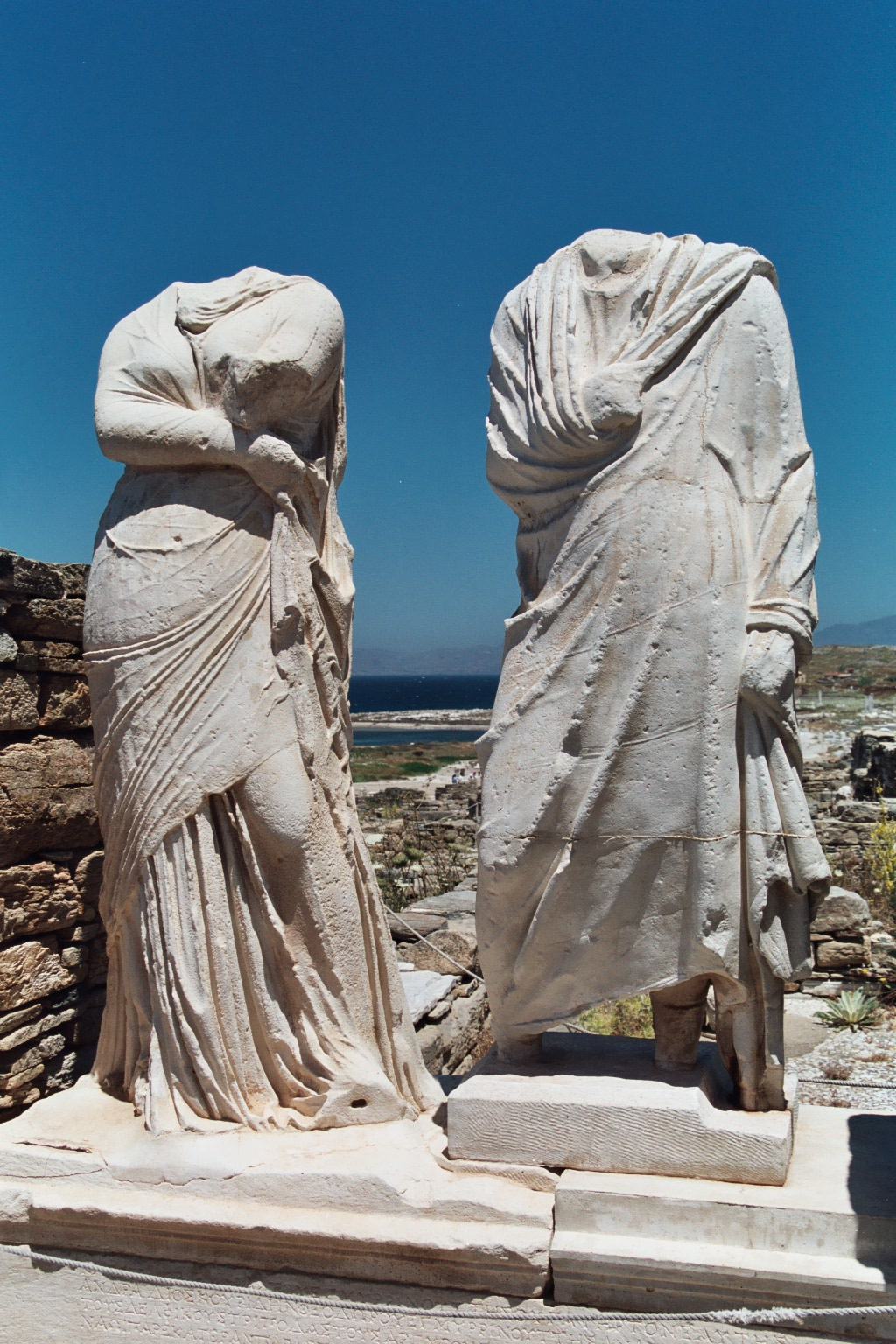
Statues at the "House of Cleopatra" in Delos, Greece. Man and woman wearing the himation

==== Himation ====
The himation was a simple wool outer garment worn over the peplos or chiton by both men and women. It consisted of heavy rectangular material, passing under the left arm and secured at the right shoulder. The himation could also be worn over both shoulders. Women can be seen wearing the himation over their head in depictions of marriages and funerals in art. Men and boys can also be seen depicted in art as wearing solely the himation with no other clothing. A more voluminous himation was worn in cold weather. The himation is referenced as being worn by Socrates in Plato's Republic.

Thoimation (Θοιμάτιον) was a contracted or colloquial form of himation.

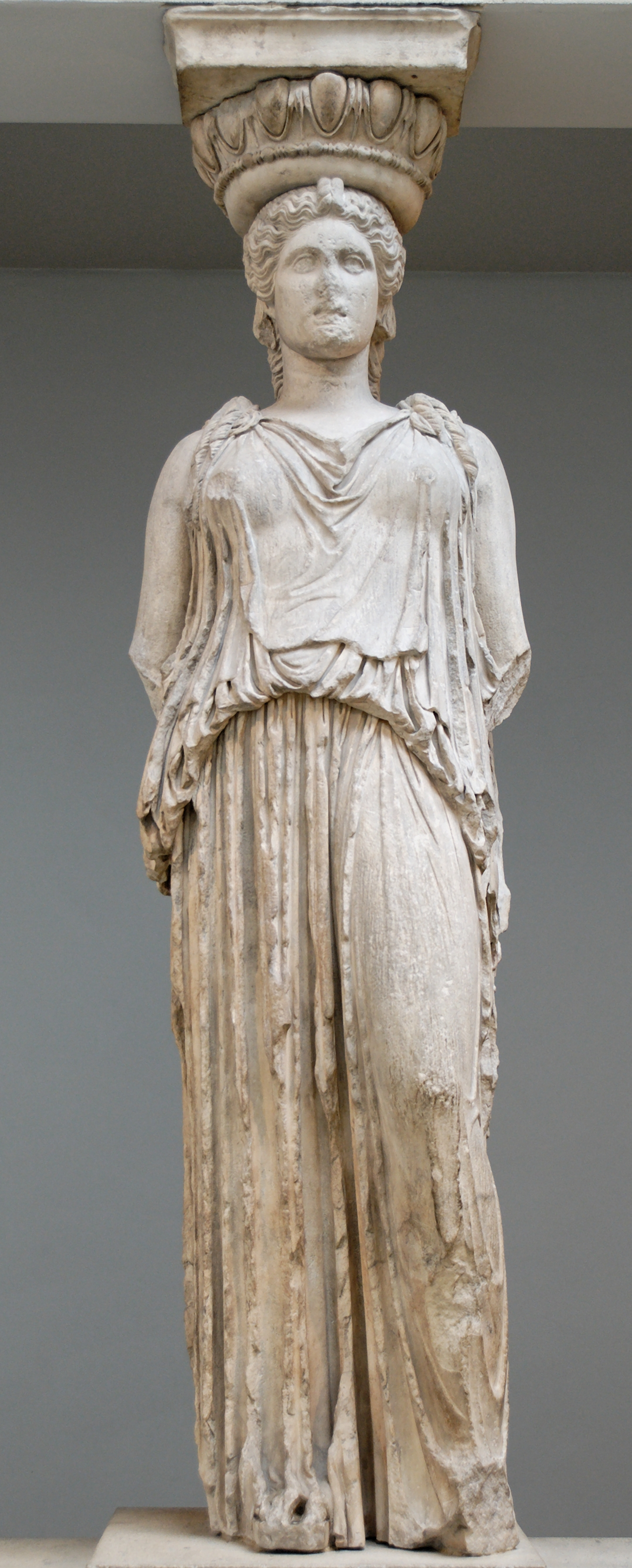
Caryatid from the Erechtheion wearing a peplos. The blousing, or kolpos, is atop zone

==== Peplos ====
The peplos was a rectangular piece of woollen garment that was pinned at both shoulders leaving the cloth open down one side which fell down around the body. The top third of the cloth was folded over to create an over-fold. A girdle or belt was used to fasten the folds at the waist and could be worn over or under the over-fold. The overfold was called apoptygma (ἀπόπτυγμα). Variations of the peplos were worn by women in many periods such as the archaic, early classical, and classical periods of ancient Greece.

=== Other garments ===
==== Allix ====
Allix (Ἄλλικα) and Gallix (Γάλλικά) was a chlamys, according to Thessalians, which was fastened with gilt brooches.

==== Ampechone ====
Ampechone (ἀμπεχόνη, ἀμπέχονον, ἀμπεχόνιον), was a shawl or scarf worn by women over the chiton or inner garment.

==== Amphimaschalos ====
Amphimaschalos (Ἀμφιμάσχαλος), a specific type of chiton that was wider. It extended over the shoulders and arms, covering the armpits (μασχάλαι). The name amphimaschalos (meaning "double-armholed" or "double-armholer") was misunderstood by later grammarians (e.g. Suda), who mistakenly believed it referred to a two-sleeved chiton. This misunderstanding led them to create the term heteromaschalos (ἑτερομάσχαλος) for a one-sleeved chiton, while the actual distinction for the ancient Greeks should have been between the amphimaschalos and exomis (one-sleeve garment, see the exomis section below).

Aristophanes, uses it mockingly or evaluatively, implying that a "double-armholer" was a garment of higher status or refinement, something not granted to everyone.

==== Aphabroma ====
Aphabroma (ἀφἀβρωμα), was a garment worn by Megarian women. According to legend, when Abrota died, her husband Nisos commanded all the Megarian women to wear a garment similar to the one Abrota had worn, which was called aphabroma. It was still in use in the time of Plutarch.

==== Birrus ====
Birrus or Burrus (βίρρος), was a cloak or cape furnished with a hood; a heavy, coarse garment for use in bad weather.

==== Cento ====
Cento (κέντρων) originally referred to a garment or covering made by sewing together various pieces of fabric. Commonly worn by slaves, soldiers, and workers, it served a practical purpose in various contexts. It was used as a protective layer in the trenches by soldiers, as a simple coverlet for beds, or as a curtain in place of a door. The cento was also employed in more utilitarian ways, such as being placed under the saddles of mules or used as a cap under a soldier’s helmet to prevent chafing. Additionally, during times of war, centones were hung on fortifications to shield them from fire and absorb the impact of weapons. Workers called centonarii were employed to craft these patchwork items.

==== Chitoniskos ====
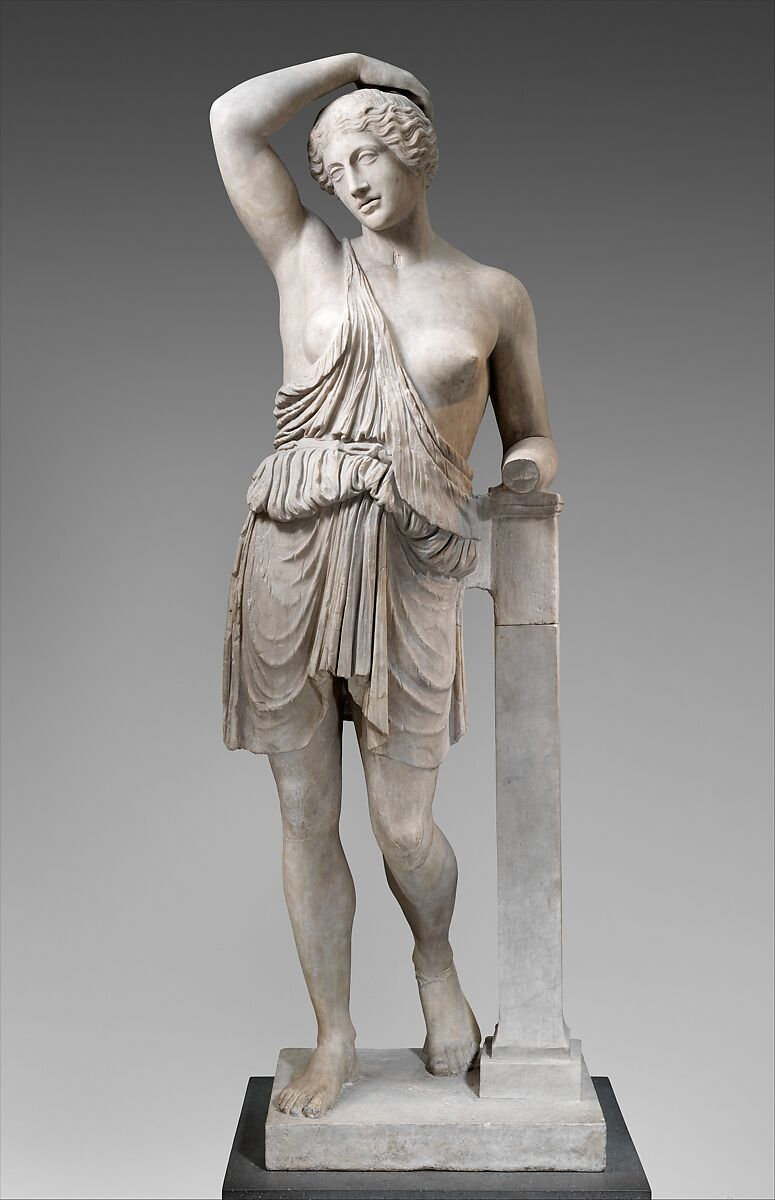
Marble statue of a wounded Amazon, wearing a Chitoniskos

Chitoniskos (χιτωνίσκος), was a short chiton sometimes worn over another chiton.

==== Chiridota ====
Chiridota (singular χειριδωτός, plural χειριδωτοί), were tunics with sleeves.

==== Chlaina, Ephaptis ====
Chlaina (Χλαῖνα) or Chlaine (Χλαῖνη), was a thick overgarment/coat. It was laid over the shoulders unfolded (ἁπλοΐς; haploís) or double-folded (δίπλαξ; díplax) with a pin. It was used as a winter cloak or as a blanket, but was finer than the sisura which was also used for a similar purpose.

Ephaptis (ἐφαπτίς) was a more costly form of the chlaina and was used by hunters and warriors.

==== Chlanis ====
Chlanis (Χλανίς), was a finer garment than chlaina and it was worn in hot weather by men, at other times by ladies, old men and effeminate persons.

==== Cyclas ====
Cyclas (Κυκλάς), was a luxurious robe worn by Roman women. In the fifth century was used as a ceremony dress and was used also by men.

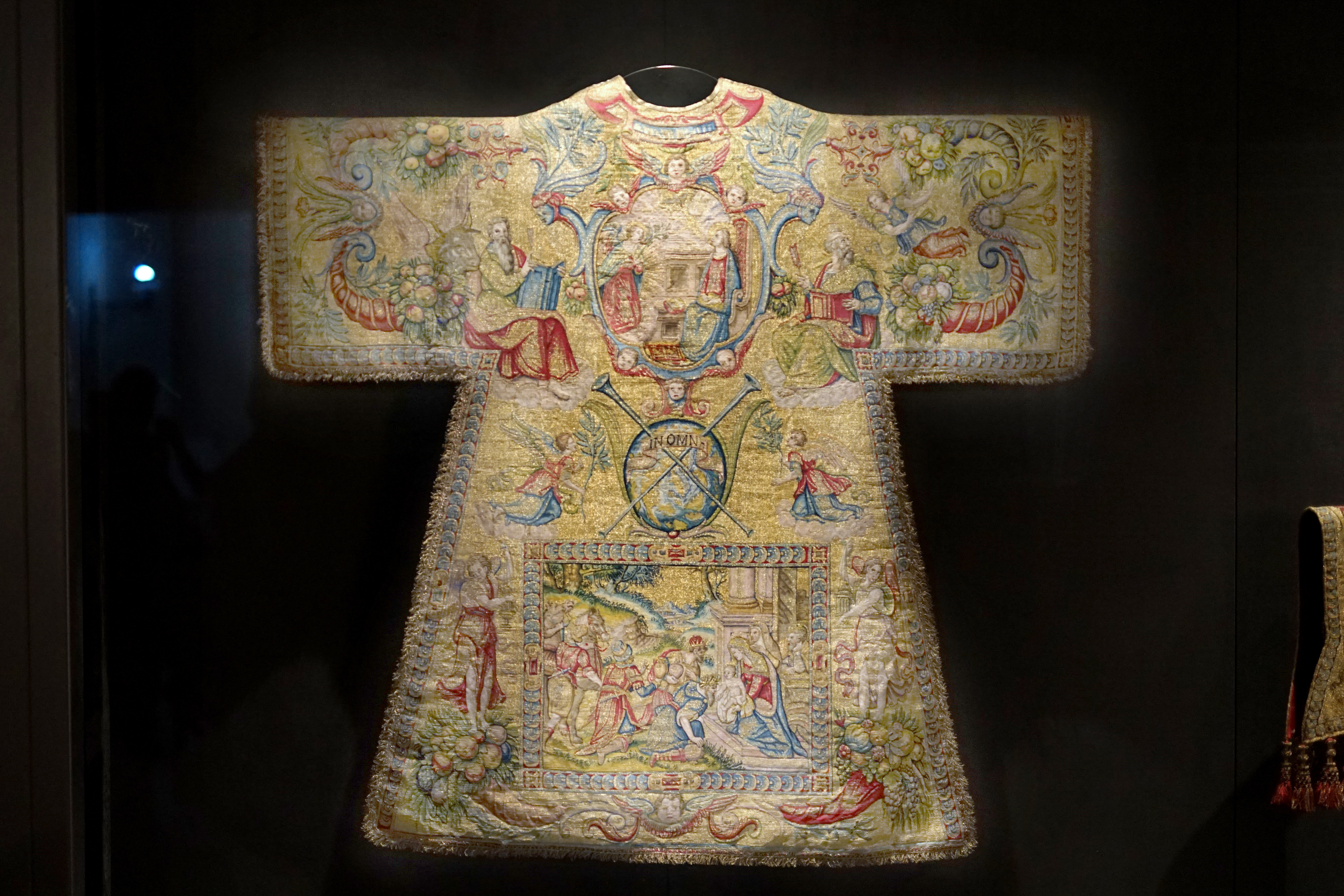
Dalmatica in Vatican Museum

==== Dalmatica ====
Dalmatica (Δαλματική) or Delmatica (Δελματική), a tunic with long sleeves, introduced from Dalmatia.

==== Diphthera ====
Diphthera (Διφθέρα) (meaning leather), a type of cloak made from hides, commonly worn by shepherds, laborers and rural people. Julius Pollux, in his descriptions of leather clothing (σκυτίναι ἐσθῆτες), notes that some versions included a hood or head-covering (ἐπίκρανον), similar to the Roman cucullus.

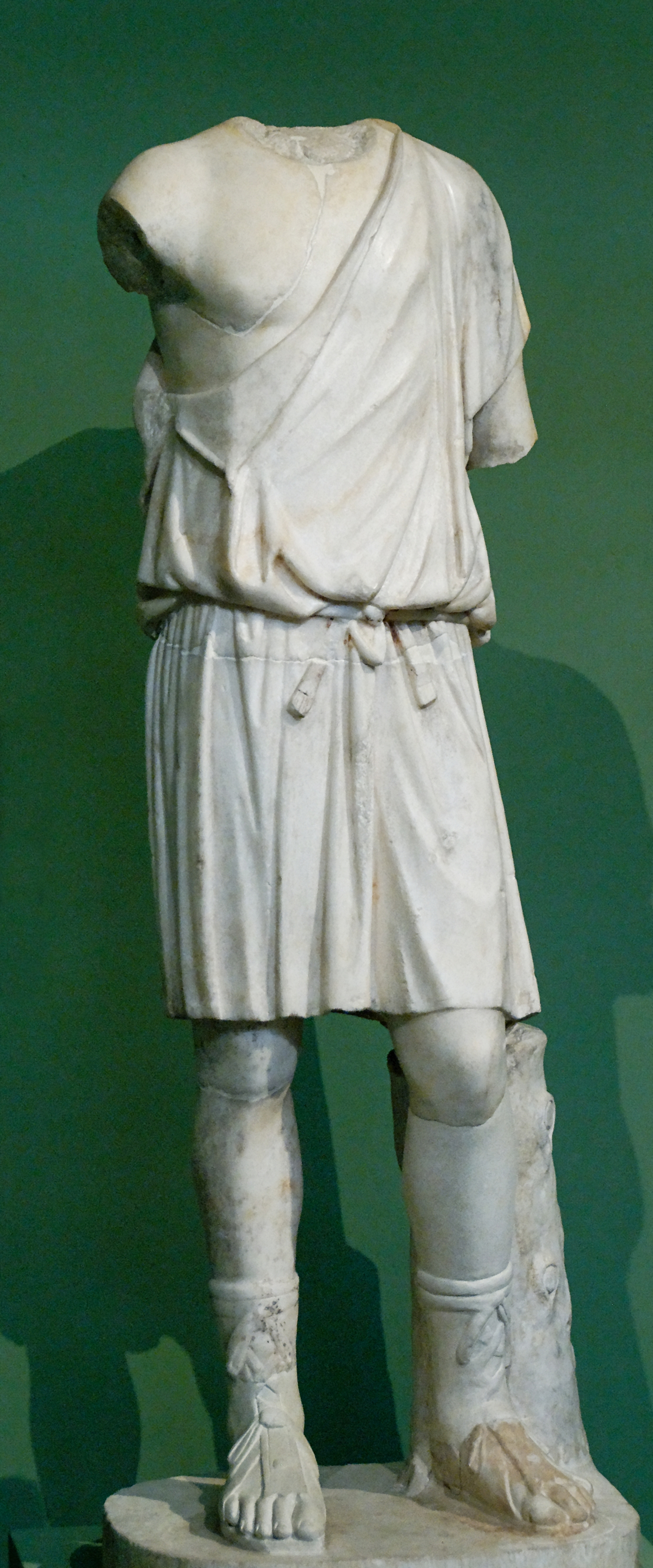
Young man wearing the exomis (tunic). Parian marble, copy after a Greek original of the 4th century BC.

==== Exomis ====
The exomis was a tunic which left the right arm and shoulder bare. It was worn by slaves and the working classes. In addition, it was worn by some units of light infantry.

==== Encomboma ====
The encomboma (ἐγκόμβωμα) was an upper garment tied round the body in a knot (κόμβος), whence the name, and worn to keep the tunic clean.

==== Egkuklon and Tougkuklon ====
Egkuklon (Ἔγκυκλον) and Tougkuklon (Τοὔγκυκλον) were woman's upper garment.

==== Kandys ====
Kandys (κάνδυς) was a Persian mantle with sleeves worn by Greek women.

==== Katonake ====
Katonake (Κατωνάκη), it was a cloak which had a fleece (nakos) hanging from the lower (kato) parts, that is a wrapped-around hide and stretched down to the knees.

==== Kolobus ====
Kolobus or Kolobium (Κολόβιον) was like a Tunic but sleeveless.

==== Krokotos ====
Krokotos (Κροκωτός) was a saffron-coloured robe/chiton.

==== Ledos, Ledarion, Speiron, Speirion ====
Λῇδος, Λῃδάριον, Σπεῖρον, Σπειρίον were summer garments.

==== Nebris ====
Nebris (Νεβρίς) (from νεβρός, a fawn), a fawn's skin worn originally mostly by hunters and afterwards attributed to Dionysus and was worn by Dionysus priestess during religious festivals.

==== Pharos ====
Pharos (Φᾶρος) was used in Homer in a general sense, referring to a textile fabric for women's garments, swaddling clothes, winding sheets, and as a substitute for sails and in a more special sense for a man's garment.

As a garment it was worn by the people of rank. Most probably it was larger than the chlaina.

There is some debate of this definition in reference to Alkman's writing on ritual activity at the sanctuary of Artemis Orthia in Sparta; Alkman Parthenion fr. i. 60: ταὶ Πελειάδες γὰρ ἆμιν Ὀρθ[ρ]ίᾳ φάρος φεροίσαις/νύκτα δι᾽ ἀμβροσίαν ἄστρον αὐειρομέναι μάχονται. Stehle here interprets the pharos as a type of ploughshare, relating it back to the fertility functions of the sanctuary.

==== Phoinikis ====
Phoinikis (Φοινικὶς) was a military chlamys.

==== Sisura ====
Sisura (Σισύρα or Σίσυρα) or Sisurna (Σίσυρνα), type of inexpensive cloak/mantle, like a one-shoulder tunic.

==== Spelex/Hemidiploidion ====
Spelex (Σπέληξ) and Hemidiploidion (ἡμιδιπλοίδιον, "semi-double") were terms used for a type of women's outer garment folded over at the upper part so that the overfold fell to the waist.

==== Spolas ====
Spolas (Σπολάς), a leather cloak, perhaps being worn on top.

==== Tebennos ====
Tebennos (Τήβεννος) and Tebenneion (Tηβέννειον), a garment like Toga.

According to tradition, the garment took its name from an Arcadian named Tebennos, who introduced this style of clothing to the people of the Ionian Gulf. They imitated his dress and named the garment after him, originally calling it tebenneion. As the word evolved over time, it became tebennos.

==== Tribon ====
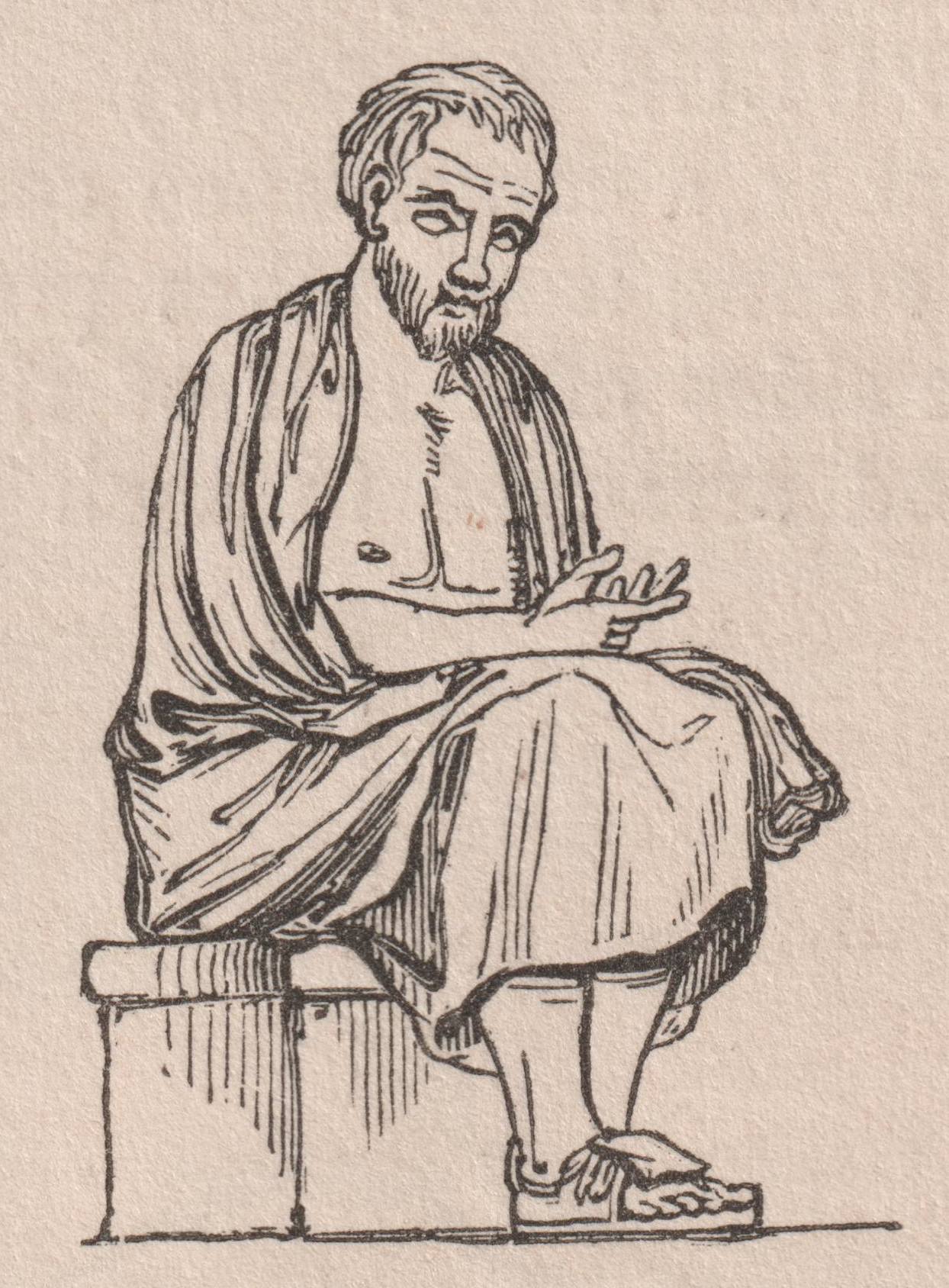
A Spartan man wearing a Tribon

Tribon (Τρίβων), simple cloak. It was worn by Spartan men and was the favorite garment of the Cynic philosophers.

==== Trichaptum ====
Trichaptum or Trichapton (Τρίχαπτον) was a fine, soft garment woven from hair, a hair garment.

==== Paenula/Phainoles ====
Paenula, Greeks called it Phainoles (φαινόλης), was a thick upper garment without sleeves, buttoned or stitched up in front, with a hood generally fastened on to it.

==== Xystis, Ephestris ====
Xystis (ξυστὶς) was a garment of fine quality worn by women of quality at festivals and by great men especially on state occasions and was used on the stage for the attire of heroic personages.

Ephestris (ἐφεστρὶς) was somewhat similar to the xystis. In Xenophon called it παχεῖα (thick) which most probably mean that it was not so light as the xystris.

==== Named after colors and texture ====
Some mantles denoted colour and texture. For example, the krokotos/crocotos (κροκωτὸς, κροκωτόν), meaning saffron-coloured, variously described as an under-garment or an upper one. Edmond Pottier suggested that this ambiguity indicates its proper place was actually between the two. It was worn by women; its use by men was considered either a mark of effeminacy or a joke (as by Agathon in The Frogs). Vatrachis (βατραχίς), meaning frog-coloured, was a man's garment. Halourga (Ἁλουργά), meaning sea-purple, were girdles, undergarments and the Laconian cloaks. Phossonion (Φωσσώνιον) was a linen item, such as a curtain, garment, or even something like a face towel, and was also the Greek term for what the Romans called an orarium.

=== Eastern clothing ===
The Greeks adopted clothing from the East such as the Lydian μανδύη, the καπυρὶς ἀκταῖα or σαραπὶς of Persia and nationalised them all over the Greek world.

Ovid, during his exile to Tomis in the early 1st century AD, documented that the descendants of the Greek colony there had replaced their ancestral attire with Persian trousers.

=== Undergarments ===
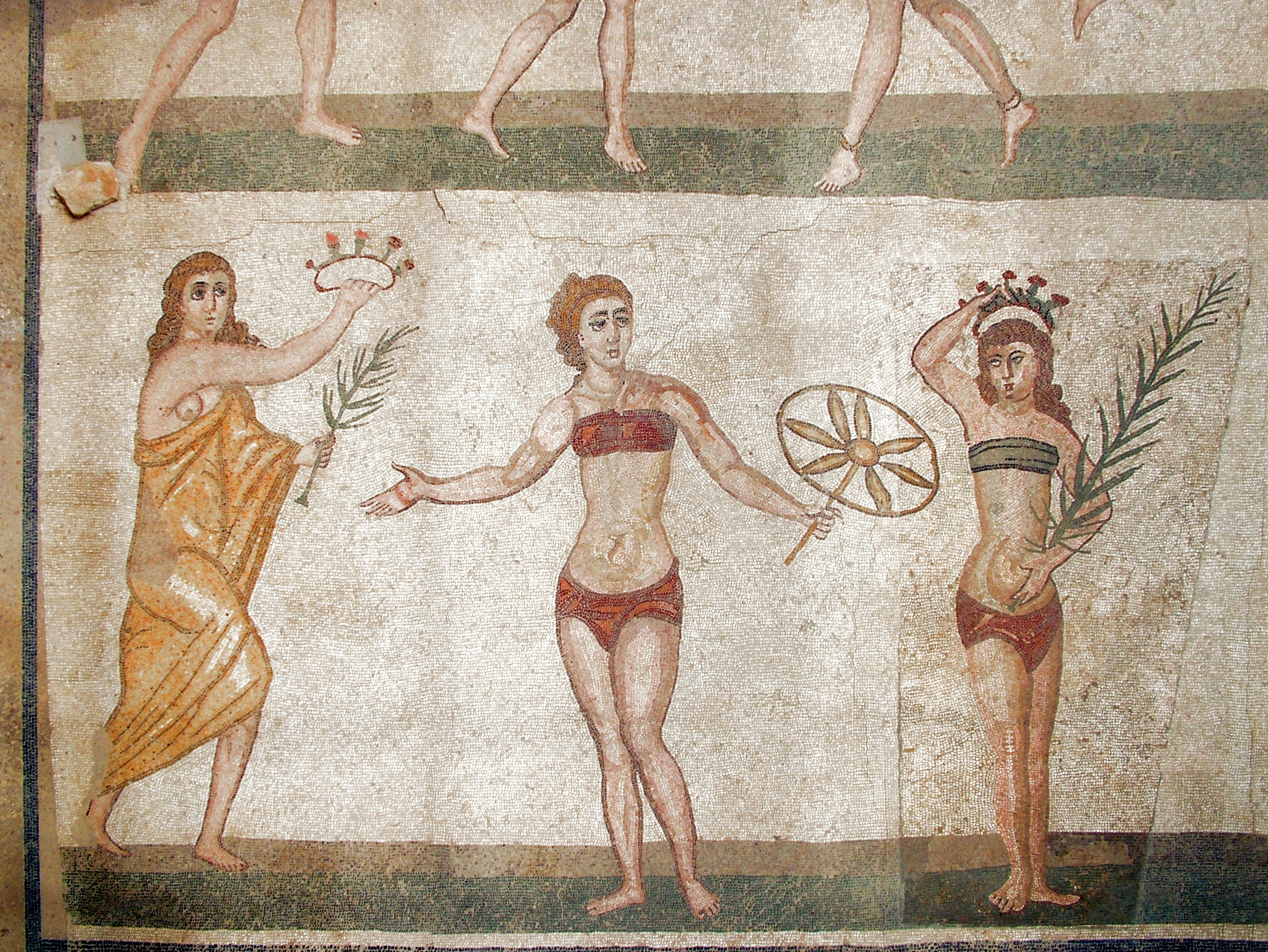
Detail of a mosaic from the Villa Romana del Casale, Sicily, featuring a woman in a strophic

Women often wore a strophic, the bra of the time, under their garments and around the mid-portion of their body. The strophic was a wide band of wool or linen wrapped across the breasts and tied between the shoulder blades.

Men and women sometimes wore triangular loincloths, called perizoma, as underwear.

=== Nudity ===
The ancient Greeks viewed nudity as an essential part of their identity that set them apart from other cultures. Males went nude for athletic events such as the Olympics. Male nudity could also be seen in Symposiums, a social event for elite men. Male nudity could also be seen in rituals such as a boys coming of age ceremony. Public female nudity was generally not accepted in ancient Greece, though occasionally woman are nude in athletic events and religious rituals. Women who were sex workers are commonly depicted as nude in ancient Greek art. Partial nudity could also be seen through the linen fabric being expertly draped around the body, and the cloth could be slightly transparent.

== Accessories ==
=== Fasteners, belts, sashes, buttons, pins, etc. ===
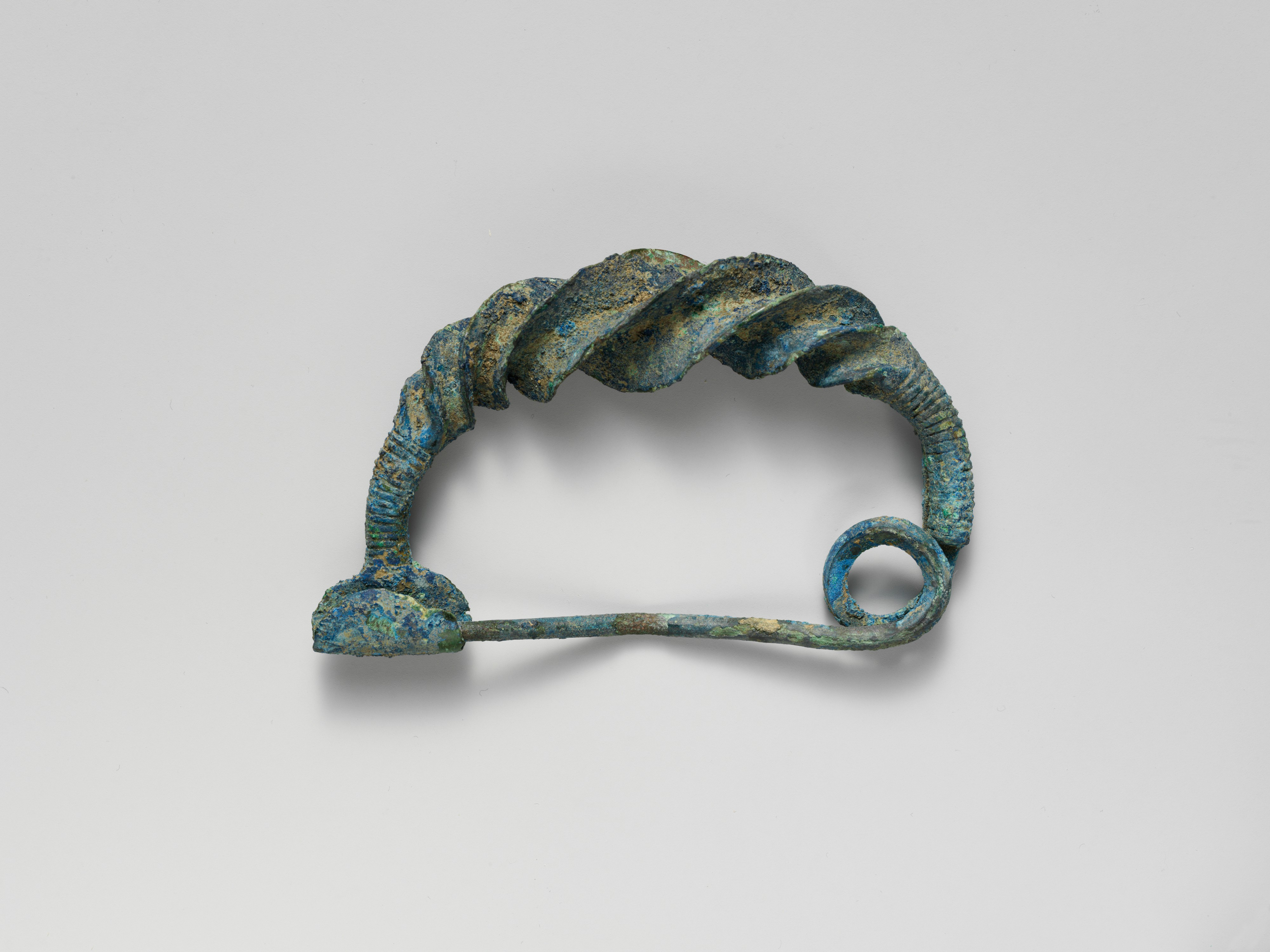
Bronze Fibula

Since clothing was rarely cut or sewn, fasteners and buttons were often used to keep garments in place. Small buttons, pins, and brooches were used.

Porpe (πόρπη), was the pin of a buckle or clasp and also the clasp itself. Large straight pins, called peronai, were worn at the shoulders, facing down, to hold the chiton or peplos in place. Fibulae were also used to pin the chiton, peplos or chlamys together. These fibulae were an early version of the safety pin. In Sophocles' Oedipus Rex, Oedipus uses pins to stab out his eyes after learning he was the one to kill his father and marry his mother.^{[}

Belts, sashes, or girdles were also worn at the waist to hold chitons and peplos.

Zone (ζώνη) was a flat and rather broad girdle worn by young unmarried women (ζώνη παρθενική) around their hips. In addition, it was a broad belt worn by men round their loins, and made double or hollow like our shot-belts, for carrying money. Furthermore, it was also called a soldier's belt, worn round the loins, to cover the juncture of the cuirass and the kilt of leather straps.

Zoster (ζωστήρ) was a belt or girdle. In the Iliad, it always refers to a warrior's belt, probably of leather covered with metal plates. It is also used of an Amazon and for a swineherd in the Odyssey. Later, it came to mean a woman's girdle. It can also refer to anything that goes round like a girdle.

Zostra (ζῶστρα) refers to belts, girdles, or waistbands. It designates certain garments for men, such as thick tunics, that are tied with a belt.

Sudarium (σουδάριον), also called ἡμιτύβιον and καψιδρώτιον, was a linen handkerchief used mostly to remove sweat from the brow or face. It was sometimes worn around the neck and, later periods, waved in the circus to indicate acclaim.

=== Footwear ===
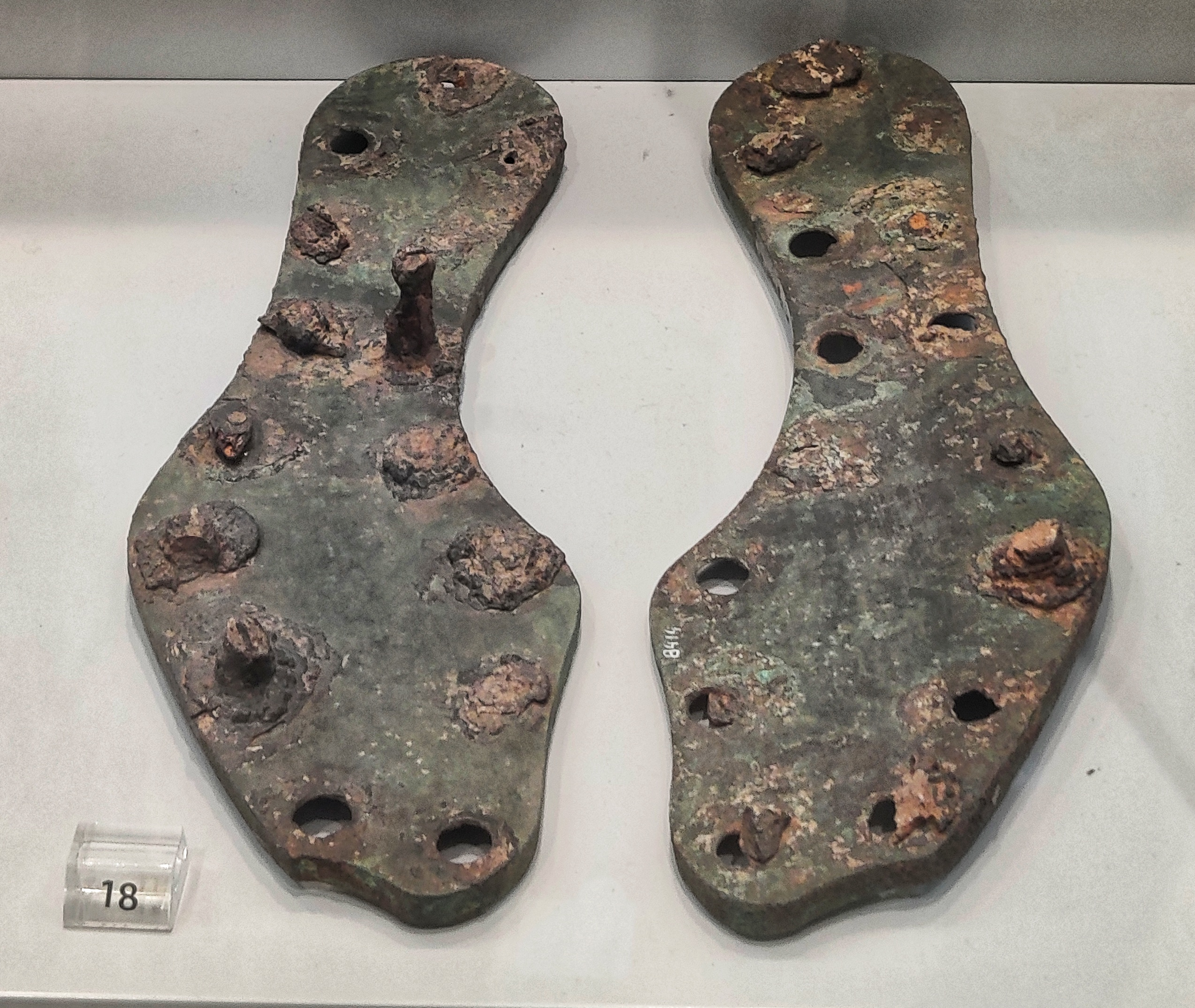
Soles of probably women's sandals, with iron nails on the periphery. After 3rd BC. National Archaeological Museum, Athens

Hesiod in his Works and Days advise his brother Perses to cover his feet with πίλοις inside his boots, similar to modern socks.

Men and women wore footwear such as sandals, shoes or boots, which were made most commonly out of leather. At home, people typically went barefoot. It was also common for philosophers such as Socrates to be barefoot as well.

The Athenian general, Iphicrates, made soldiers' boots that were light and easy to untie. These boots were called afterwards, from his name, Iphicratids (Ancient Greek: Ἰφικρατίδες).

The bodyguards of the Peisistratid tyrants were called wolf-feet (Λυκόποδες). According to one theory, they were called like this because they had their feet covered with wolf-skins, to prevent frostbites.

Kassyma (κάσσυμα) was an extra thick sole for the shoe or sandal frequently used to increase the height of the wearer. They were made of cork.

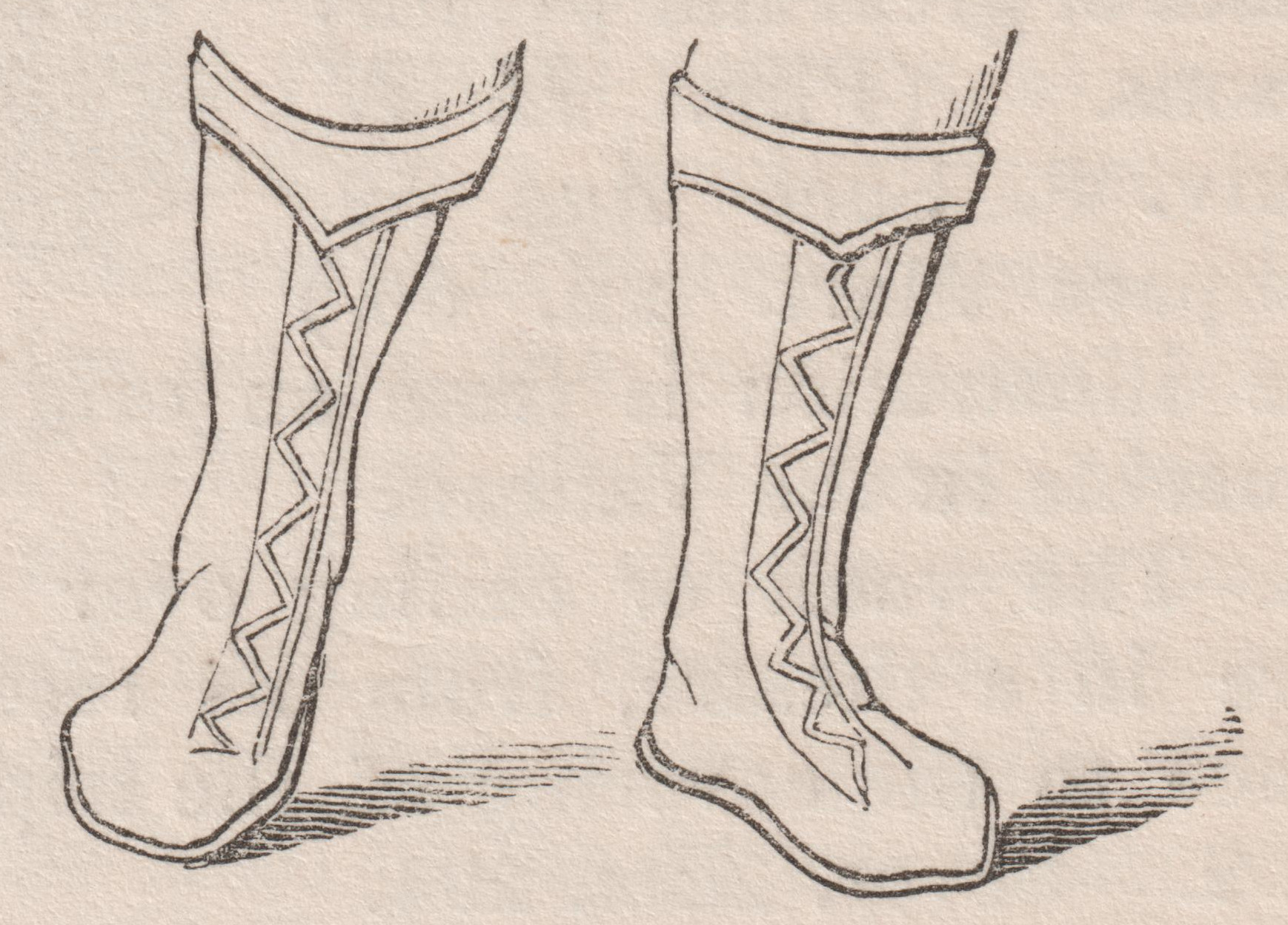
Cothurnus drawing

Cothurnus (Κόθορνος) was a high shoe or buskin with several soles. It covered the whole foot, and rose as high as the middle of the leg. It was made so as to fit either foot and was generally fastened in front with straps. Although originally a hunting boot, it was adopted by Aeschylus as part of theatrical costumes to make actors appear taller. The Greeks did not use this term for the tragic boot; instead, they called it okribas (ὀκρίβας) or, more commonly, embates (ἐμβάτης).

==== Other footwear ====
Arbele (ἀρβύλη, arbýlē), a short or half-boot.

Baucides (βαυκίδες, baukídes) or Boucidium (βουκίδιον, boukídion), a kind of costly shoe of a saffron colour, worn exclusively by women.

Blaute (βλαύτη) refers to a type of footwear, specifically slippers.

Blautiois (βλαυτίοις) were sandals.

Carbatina (καρβατίνη, karbatínē), shoes worn by rustics, with sole and upper leather all in one. A piece of untanned ox-hide placed under the foot and tied up by several thongs, so as to cover the whole foot and part of the leg.

Crepida (κρηπίς, krēpís), a kind of shoe between a closed boot and plain sandals.

Croupezai (κρούπεζαι, kroúpezai), croupezia (κρουπέζια, kroupézia), or croupala (κρούπαλα, kroúpala), wooden shoes worn by peasants and taking their names from noise which they made. Photius wrote that they were used for treading out olives.

Embas (ἐμβάς, embás) or embates (ἐμβάτης, embátēs), kind of a closed boot.

Endromis (ἐνδρομίς, endromís), a kind of a leather boot (In Roman times endromis was a thick woollen rug/cloak).

Zinixion (ζινίχιον) and sfairwthr (σφαιρωτήρ) were the strap/latchet of the sandal.

Amyklai (Ἀμύκλαι) were described as a type of bronze shoes or foot ornaments worn by Empedocles.

Diabathrum or Diabathron (διάβαθρον) was a sandal or light shoe or slipper.

Milesian shoes were a type of footwear that, according to ancient sources, Antigenidas of Thebes, was wearing.

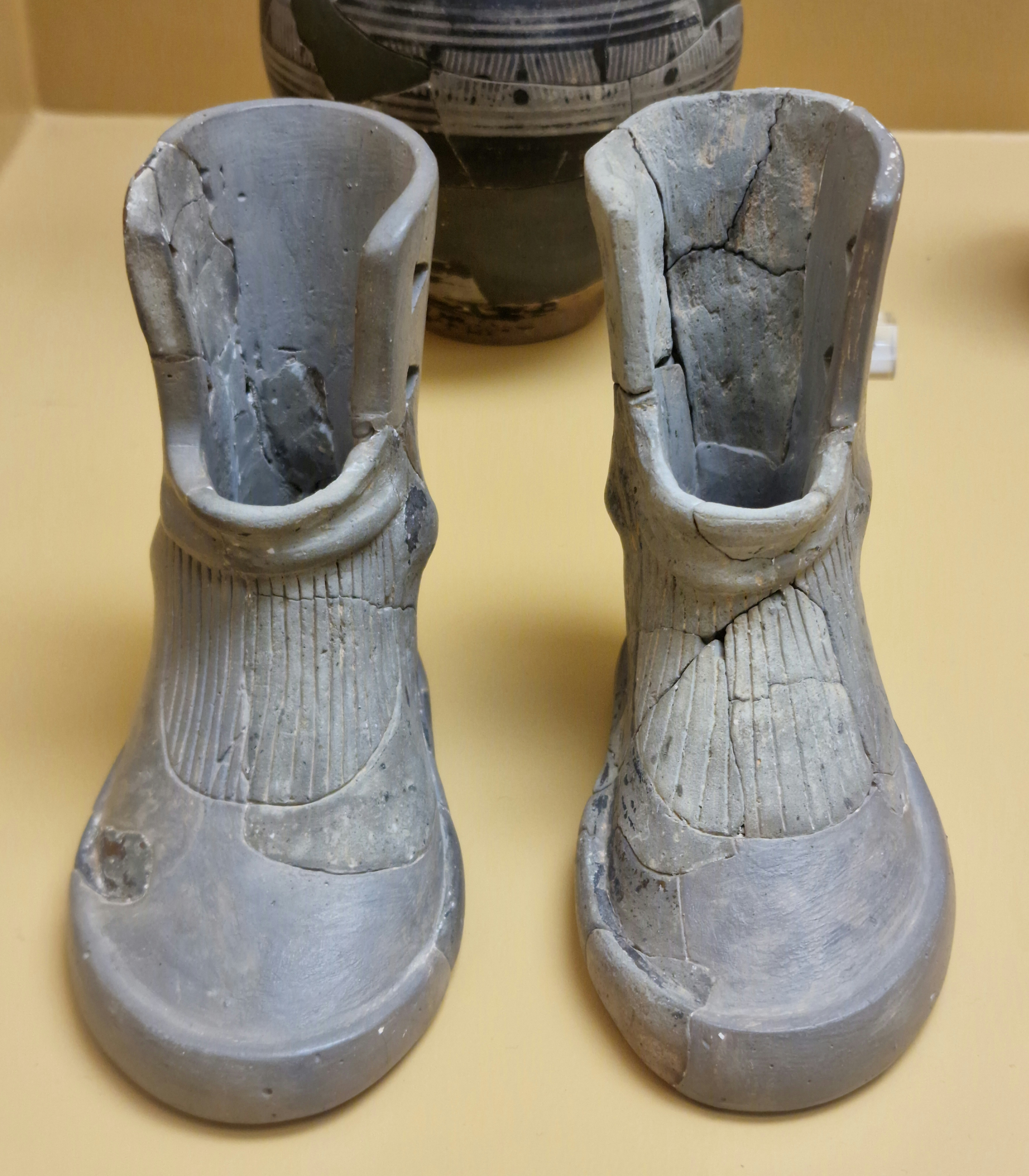
Pair of terracotta boots, offerings at a burial of a woman, circa 900 BC, Stoa of Attalos, Athens.

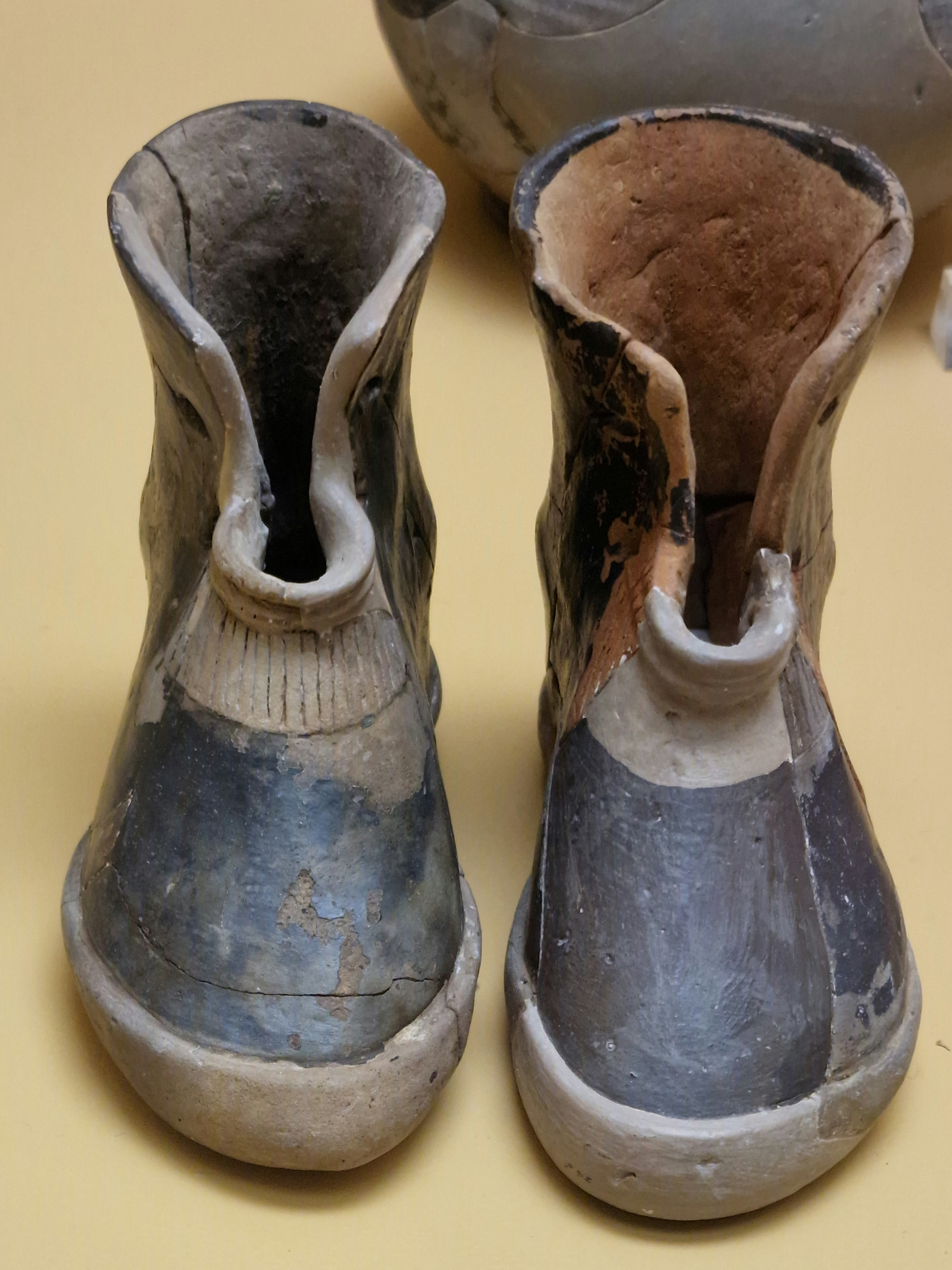
Pair of terracotta boots, offerings at a burial of a woman, circa 900 BC, Stoa of Attalos, Athens.

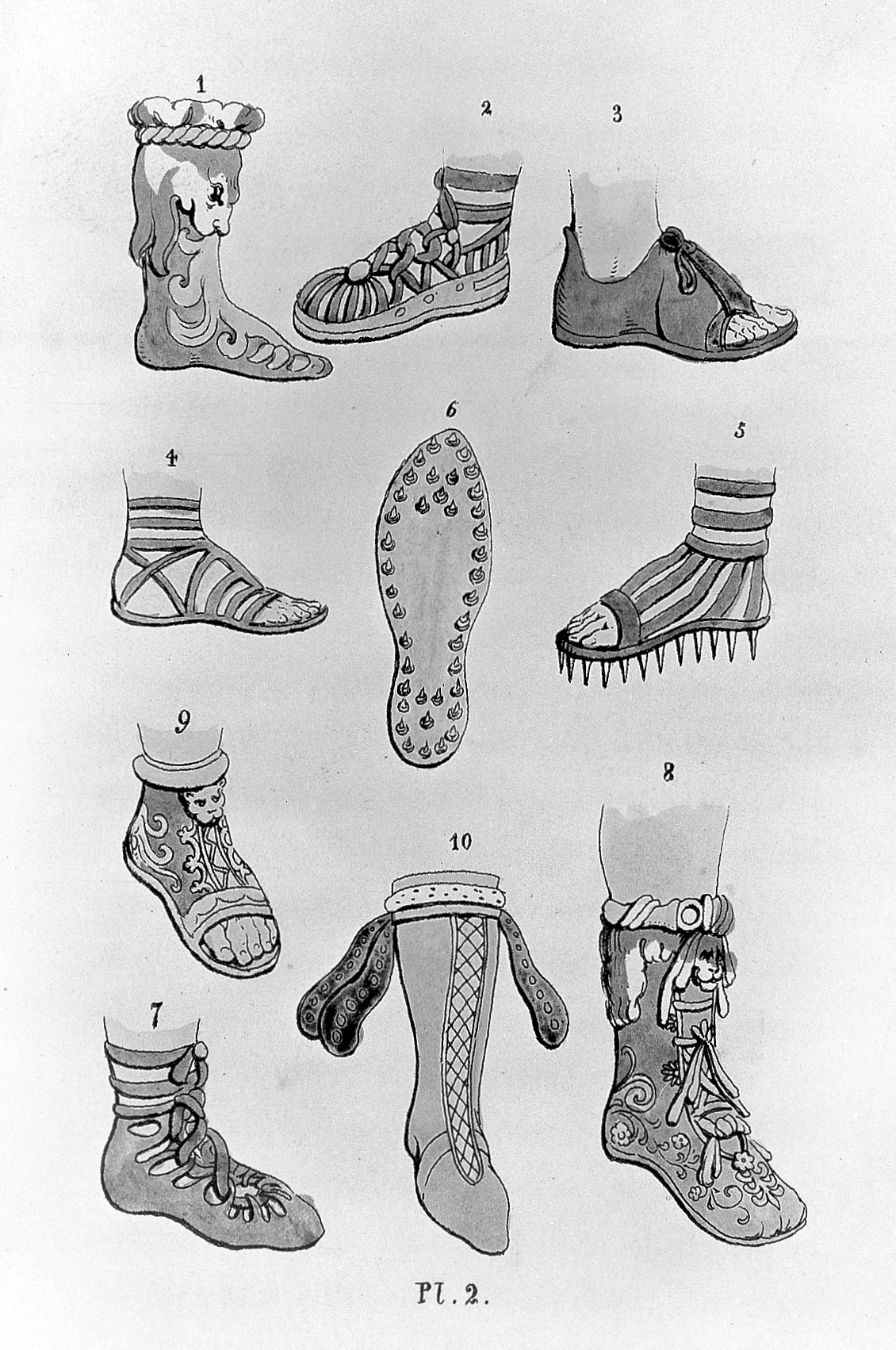
Greek and Roman shoes from The book of the feet by Joseph Sparkes Hall, 1847

=== Headgear ===
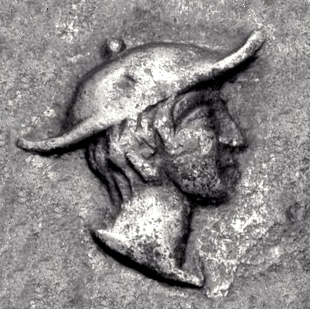
Man wearing a petasos, Coinage of Kapsa Macedon c. 400 BCE

Women and men wore different types of headgear. Women could wear veils to preserve their modesty. Men would wear hats for protection against the elements. Both men and women also wore different types of headbands to pull their hair up or for decoration.

Pilei and petasoi were common hats worn by men in ancient Greece. The pileus was a close-fitting cap which could have been made out of a variety of materials such as leather and wool. While the petasos was a broad brimmed hat with an attached cord that hung down around the chin.

Kredemnon (κρήδεμνον) was a woman's headdress or veil of uncertain form, a sort of covering for the head with lappets hanging down to the shoulders on both sides, and when drawn together concealing the face.

Ampyx (ἄμπυχ) was a headband worn by Greek women to confine the hair, passing round the front of the head and fastening behind. It appears generally to have consisted of a plate of gold or silver, often richly worked and adorned with precious stones.

Sphendone (σφενδόνη) was a fastening for the hair used by the Greek women.

Tainia was a headband, ribbon, or fillet.

Kekryphalos (κεκρύφαλος) was a Hairnet and Sakkos (σάκκος) a hair sack/cap used by the Greek women.

Diadema (διάδημα), a fillet which was the emblem of sovereignty.

Kuneh (κυνέη) was a peasant's cap (the term was also used to describe a helmet).

Phakellos (φάκελλος) and Phakelos (φάκελος), Phakiolion (Φακιόλιον), Simikinthion (Σιμικίνθιον) were all terms used to describe various types of head wraps.

The Suda records that, according to Creon, the kordyle (κορδύλη) is the term used by the Cypriots for the band or wrapping worn on the head; the Athenians called it a krobylon (κρώβυλον) or krobylos (κρώβυλoς and κρωβύλος), and the Persians called it a nidarion (νιδάριον). However, elsewhere the Suda refers to the Persian head wrap as a kidaris (κίδαρις), and notes that people used the term kidaris to refer to various types of headwear, such as a royal skullcap or a priest's headband.

At one time, ancient Athenian men wore gold hair ornaments in the shape of cicadas, symbolizing their claim to being autochthonous. For this reason, they were also called cicada-wearers (Τεττιγοφόροι). This fashion, later spread to the Ionians as well.

Greeks also used wigs made from real and artificial hair, worn by both men and women for personal adornment, disguise or as a symbol of status. Of artificial hair, one type was called ἔντριχον (entrixon, "hairpiece/wig/with the hair on"), another προκόμιον (prokomion, "forelock") and another πηνίκη (phnike, "false hair"; from which also comes the verb πηνικίζειν, meaning "to deceive"). Wigs were also used in the theatre, with hairstyles tailored to characters in comedy and tragedy: black hair for tyrants, fair curls for young heroes and red hair for deceitful slaves. The wig were also called phenake (φενάκη; "deception") or κόμαι πρόσθετοι ("additional hair/attached hair").

=== Jewelry ===
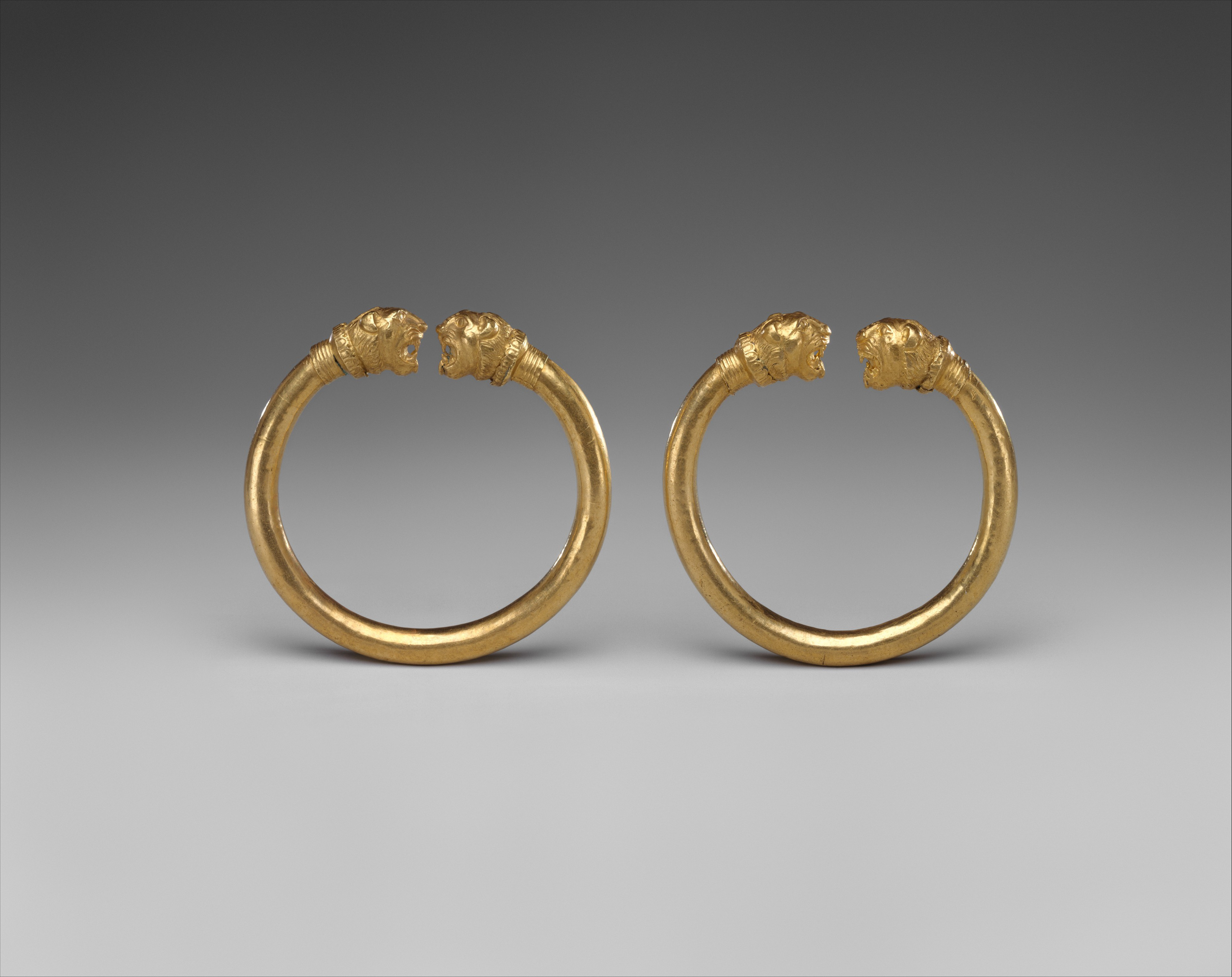
Gold bracelets decorated with lion heads.

Ornamentation in the form of jewelry, elaborate hairstyles, and make-up was common for women. While jewelry was used to decorates oneself, it was also used as status symbol to show one's wealth. The Greeks wore jewelry such as rings, wreaths, diadems, bracelets, armbands, pins, pendants, necklaces, and earrings. Small gold ornaments would be sewn onto their clothing and would glitter as they moved. Common designs on jewelry in ancient Greece included plants, animals and figures from Greek mythology. Gold and silver were the most common mediums for jewelry. However, jewelry from this time could also have pearls, gems, and semiprecious stones used as decoration. Jewelry was commonly passed down in families from generation to generation.

Greeks used many different words to describe the earrings including the Elikteres (ἑλικτῆρες), Enotia (ἑνώτια, sometimes called Enodia (ἑνώδια) in some inscriptions), Plastra (πλάστρα), Ellobia (ἑλλόβια) and ermata (ἕρματα).

Sphingter (σφιγκτήρ) was a coil bracelet, made of gold, worn by women on the left arm. Pselion (ψέλιον) was a kind of bracelet or armlet worn by Persians, but also adopted by Greeks.

Arm ornaments were distinguished by their placement on the arm. The περιβραχιόνιον (plural περιβραχιόνια; from βραχίων, the upper arm from elbow to shoulder) and ὄκκαβος were worn on the upper arm, while the περικάρπιον (plural περικάρπια) was worn on the wrist, functioning as a bracelet. In later Greek, additional terms such as βραχιόλιον, βραχίολος and βραχιόνιον emerged to describe similar ornaments. The Suda defines χλιδόνες as decorative items worn around the arms, synonymous with βραχιόλια. These items came in various shapes and were sometimes named accordingly, for example ὄφεις ("snakes") and δράκοντες ("dragons") referred to coiled bracelets that wrapped multiple times around the arm, while ἐχῖνοι ("sea urchins") likely described spiked or rounded designs.

In Homer's works, the terms hormos (ὅρμος) and isthmion (ἴσθμιον) both describe neck adornments, but they are not identical. The ἴσθμιον was a tight-fitting necklace encircling the neck. The ὅρμος, on the other hand, was often much longer and draped loosely so that it lay across the chest. According to scholiasts, the ἴσθμιον clings closely to the neck, whereas the ὅρμος hangs down in a more relaxed fashion.

Periscelis (περισκελίς), was an anklet worn by women. The plebeian women wore anklets of silver, whereas the patricians of gold. These ornaments are also called περισφύρια, while sometimes they are referred to by more general names such as πέδαι (singular πέδη) or ἀμφιδέαι (singular ἀμφιδέα). The word πέδη was also used to describe a fetter or shackle for the ankles constructed as to deprive the prisoner almost wholly of the power of walking.

Pyxis (πυξίς) was a small container made from boxwood (πύξος), typically used as a jewelry box or for storing small valuable items.

Dactylios (Δακτύλιος; plural: Δακτύλιοι), was a term used for a ring of any kind, especially a finger-ring. Seal rings made of amber and ivory were frequently worn by women. Dactyliotheca (Δακτυλιοθήκη), derived from the words daktylios (ring) and theke (casket/case), was a case or box where rings were kept, the same term was used to describe a collection of rings.

=== Gloves ===
Cheirides (χειρίδες) were fingerless gloves, primarily for protection against briars and thorns. These gloves were distinct from full gloves, which had fingers and called χειρίδες δακτυλωταί or δακτυλῆθραι. Additionally, the term χειρὶς πλέα ἀργυρίου likely referred to a leather glove used as a purse.

=== Stick, baculum and staff ===
In ancient Greece, the stick (known variously as βάκλον, βακτηρία, ῥάβδος, σκῆπτρον or σκυτάλη) was a common and versatile object, serving both practical and symbolic purposes. It appeared in several distinct forms across regions and social contexts. Athenian dandies during the time of Aristophanes favored a straight cane with an ornamented head, popularly called the Persian stick (Περσικὴ βακτηρία). In contrast, elderly men and rural folk typically carried a crooked staff (καμπύλη). In more austere Greek areas such as Sparta and Sicyon, people often wielded heavier, club-like sticks (called σκυτάλη or βακτηρία ἀκροπαχὴς). These were later adopted in Athens by admirers of Spartan culture (Λακωνισταί) and also became emblematic of Cynic philosophers. Additionally, there was also a crutch-style stick used for physical support. Beyond their practical function, sticks carried symbolic weight. In Athens, dicasts (jurors) received a staff upon appointment as a mark of their civic role. Similarly, Spartan kings carried staffs as emblems of authority.

=== Purse and Pouch ===
The ballantion (βαλλάντιον) or balantion (βαλάντιον) was a leather purse, known in Latin as a crumena (plural crumenae), typically worn slung around the neck and hanging behind the back, making it vulnerable to thieves known as ballantiotomoi (βαλλαντιοτόμοι, “cut-purses”). To guard against theft, masters often walked behind the slaves who carried their purses. These purses came in various shapes, including flat, flap-closed bags similar to a postman’s satchel and round drawstring pouches known as συσπαστὰ βαλλάντια.

The term marsupium (μαρσύπιον), a diminutive of marsipos (μάρσιπος) meaning a "bag", was also used to describe a small pouch or purse. The Suda also attests the term fagylion (φαγύλιον) with the meaning "purse" or "small bag".

Boulgidion (Βουλγίδιον; diminutive from Latin bulga), Korykion (Κωρύκιον) and Korykos (Κώρυκος) were terms used for a small bag/pouch.

For journeys and campaigns, a safer type of purse, the girdlepurse, was often used to protect valuables more securely.

The term χειρὶς πλέα ἀργυρίου likely referred to a leather glove used as a purse.

Adoros (Ἄδορος) was meaning a leather bag.

== See also ==
- Greek dress
- Biblical clothing
- Clothing in ancient Rome
- Clothing in the ancient world
