= Antigenidas =

Antigenidas may refer to:

- Antigenidas of Thebes, 4th century BC Greek musician and poet
- Antigenidas of Orchomenus, 4th century BC cavalryman to Alexander the Great
