= Kolpos =

Loose fold of an ancient Greek garment

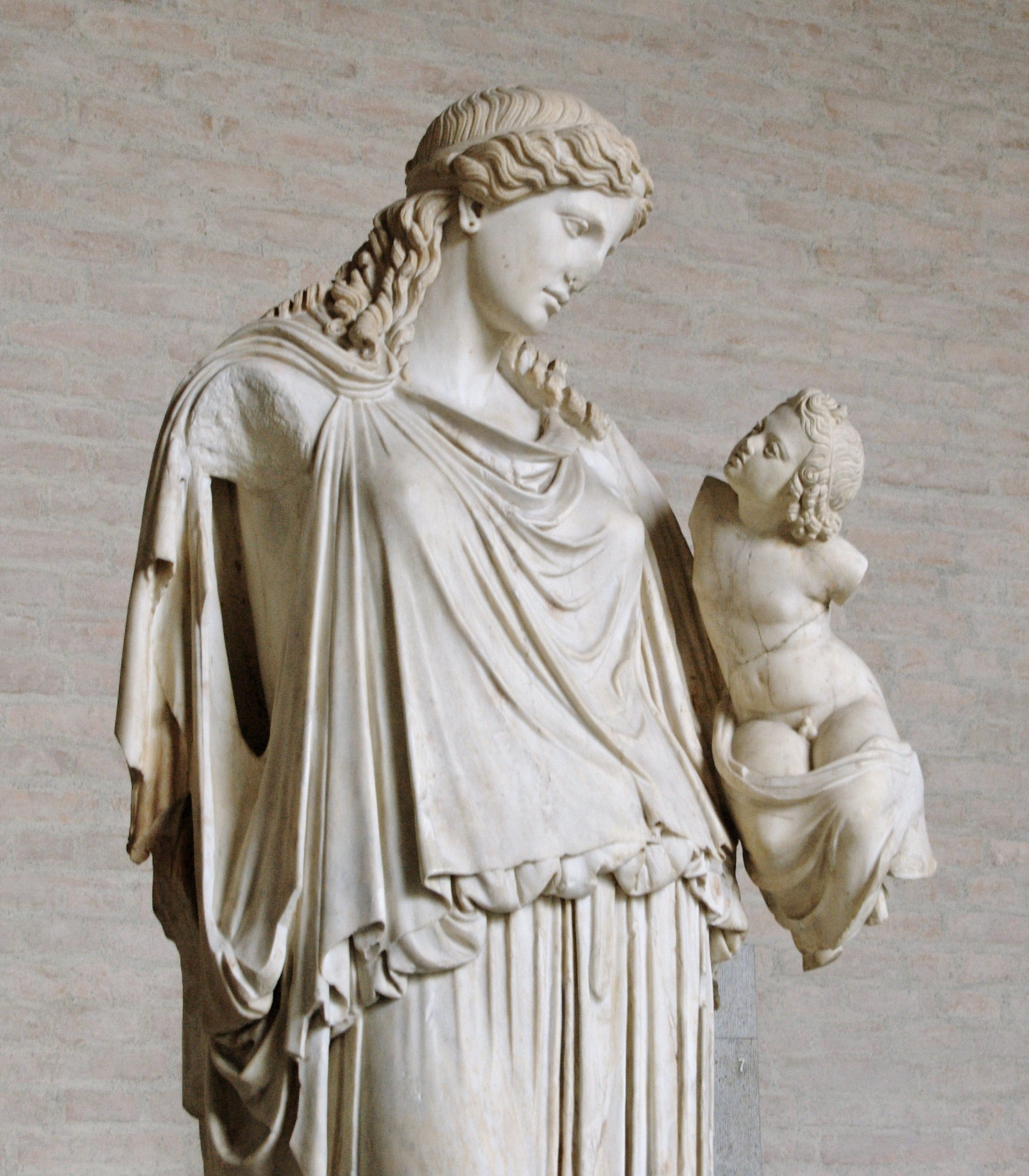
A statue wearing a peplos. The kolpos is visible as a fold over the hip, underneath the apoptygma (top edge of the peplos) hanging down almost to the same length.

The kolpos (Greek κόλπος, breast) is the blousing of a peplos, chiton, or tunic in Ancient Greek clothing, whereby excess length of the material hangs folded over a zone (a narrow girdle).

The fabric of the garment was typically cut longer than the shoulder-to-floor measurement of the women or men wearing it. The excess length was dealt with, at the waist (creating the kolpos) and optionally the top edge (creating the apoptygma). To create the kolpos, a zone was tied around the body below the breast (high-girdled) or at the waist (low-girdled) and excess fabric was pulled up over it. The fabric fell over the girdle so as to hide it, and was often pulled longer in back than in front. This fold was the kolpos. A second (visible) zone could be tied over the kolpos to redefine the waist, high or low. This might be hidden again by the apoptygma, the loose, folded down top of the peplos.

== See also ==
- Clothing in ancient Greece
