= Zone (vestment) =

Vestment; form of girdle or belt common in the ancient eastern Mediterranean

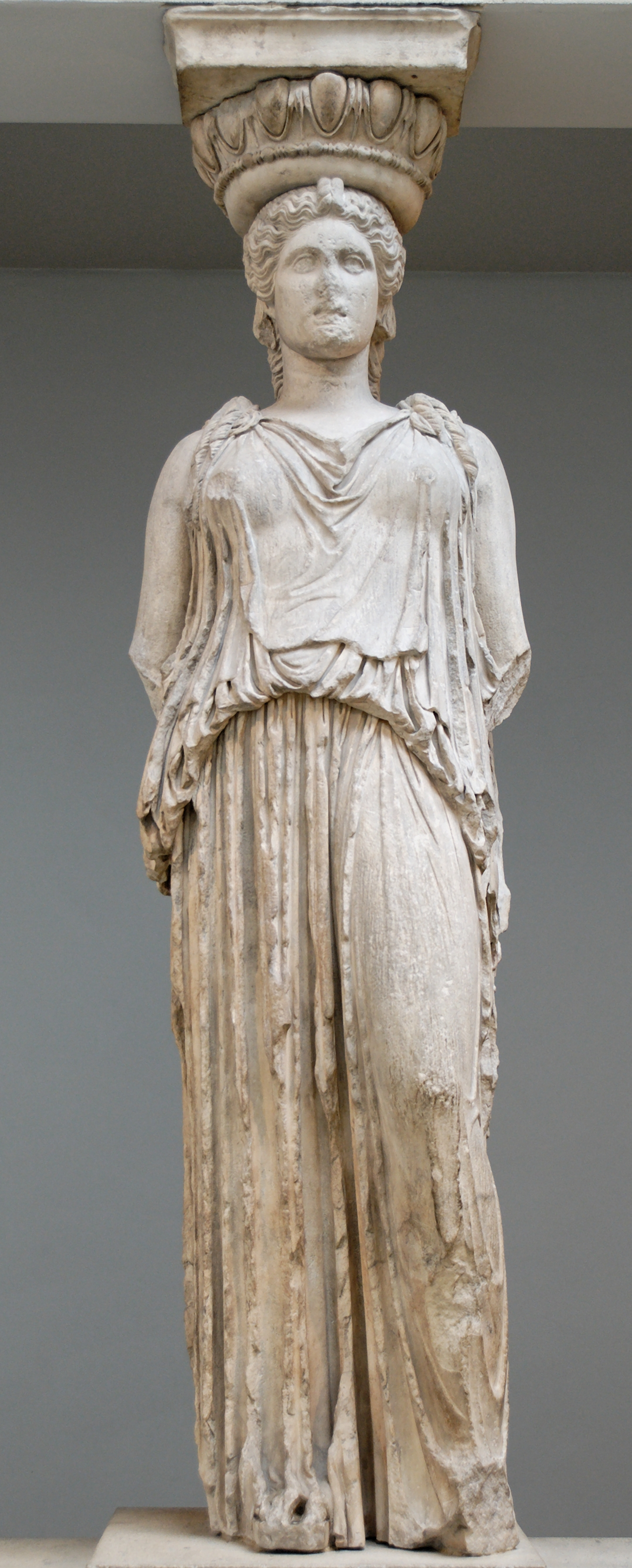
Caryatid wearing peplos from the Erechtheion (British Museum). Note the blousing, or Kolpos, over the Zone.

Zone belt in the Russian edition of Reallexikon des classischen Alterthums

The zone (/ˈzoʊnɛ/ ZOH-neh or /ˈzoʊni/ ZOH-nee; Greek: ζώνη, romanized: zṓnē) is a form of girdle or belt common in the ancient Eastern Mediterranean. In ancient Greece, the zone was traditionally worn by women.

== In ancient Greece ==
=== Cultural significance ===
For ancient Greek women, the zone is used as a sign of their sexual maturity, since pre-pubescent girls do not wear them. However, younger girls do wear zones, but an unbelted version of it. Adult women who are unmarried wear a belted version of the zone which signifies their virginity. The process of the bride tying the belt's knot prior to the wedding is symbolic of her readiness for marriage. The belt is meant to be removed by their husband on their wedding night. A married woman still uses a zone, and also a belted version, though it looks different from the one used by an unmarried woman. The belts are only removed during their pregnancy and childbirth.

At the same time, female foreigners (also known as barbarians in ancient Greece) do not wear belts. The male foreigners, however, do, and this signifies their lack of manliness.

=== In literature ===
The zone has featured in Greek literature depicting female mythological figures. It is often used to symbolize female sexuality, such as when Hera seduced her husband, Zeus, while wearing her zone in the Iliad or Pandora, as she was created by Athena in Works and Days, appeared with her zone and "silvery raiment". The zone is also used as a way to maintain female agency, where the zone is used by Aeschylus' Suppliant Maidens as a way to die by suicide when the alternative is to enter unwanted matrimony.

== In Christianity ==
In modern Greek and Church Slavonic the zone or (Пояс, poyas - belt) is a liturgical belt worn as a vestment by priests and bishops of the Eastern Orthodox Church, Oriental Orthodox Churches, and Eastern Catholic Churches. It is made of brocade with an embroidered or appliquéd cross in the center, with long ribbons at the ends for tying around the waist. It is worn over the sticharion and the epitrachelion and keeps them in place as the priest performs the Divine Liturgy. In this regard it is similar to the cincture of the Roman Catholic Church.

The zone is not worn for services when the priest is not fully vested, e.g. vespers or matins.

The zone worn by priests of the Old Believers of the Russian Tradition, have a unique design, with four pendant strips, two on each hip. This was the result of legislation passed under Empress Catherine the Great, mandating that the vestments of Old Believer clergy be sufficiently different from those of clergy belonging to the State Church, in order to avoid confusion.

== See also ==
- Clothing in the ancient world
- Clothing in ancient Greece
- Chiton (garment)
- Peplos
- Zoster (costume)
- Kushti worn by Zoroastrians
- Himiana worn by Mandaeans
