= Peronai =

Clothing pin from ancient Greece

The peronai or perone (Ancient Greek: περόνη, perónē), also known as porpe (πόρπη), is a straight, long pin used to fasten the outerwear worn by women and men in Ancient Greece. Historically, peronei is also used as a weapon by women in Greek literature.

== Usage ==
=== As accessories ===
The visual depiction of peronai shows that the pin is used mostly by women to fasten their peplos. One of the only surviving vases depicting how peronai is used – the François Vase – showed one of the women in the vase, using the peronai where the head of the pin is inserted in between parts of the fabric on her shoulder, with the unprotected part facing upwards.

However, descriptions from Ancient Greek literature show that peronai is also used by men. One of these examples was found in the Odyssey, where a peronai is used to fasten Odysseus’ mantle. The Iliad also mentions gold peronai as gifts given by Athena Ergane to Hera.

Peronai seems to have been used as an accessory until the Classical era when the use of buttons was more favored.

=== As weapons ===
Peronai is often used as a weapon by female mythological figures and characters from Ancient Greek literature. For example, in the Iliad, Athena mentions the usage of peronai as a weapon used by an Achaian woman. Peronai is also mentioned several times for causing the blindness of figures in Greek legends such as Oedipus and Polymestor, who were both injured by female characters.

== Materials and size ==
Archeological discoveries of peronai from Ancient Greece showcased two different sizes of the pins, with the length of the first pin at 23 cm, and the other at 40 cm. Peronai tends to be made from metallic materials, such as bronze, silver, and gold.

== In other cultures ==
Peronai bears similarity to a similar, unnamed pin used by the people of Hasanlu of ancient Iran, whose women also used the pin as weapons.

== See also ==
- Himation
- Clothing in ancient Greece
- Women in Greece
