= Kandys =

Type of three-quarter-length Persian coat

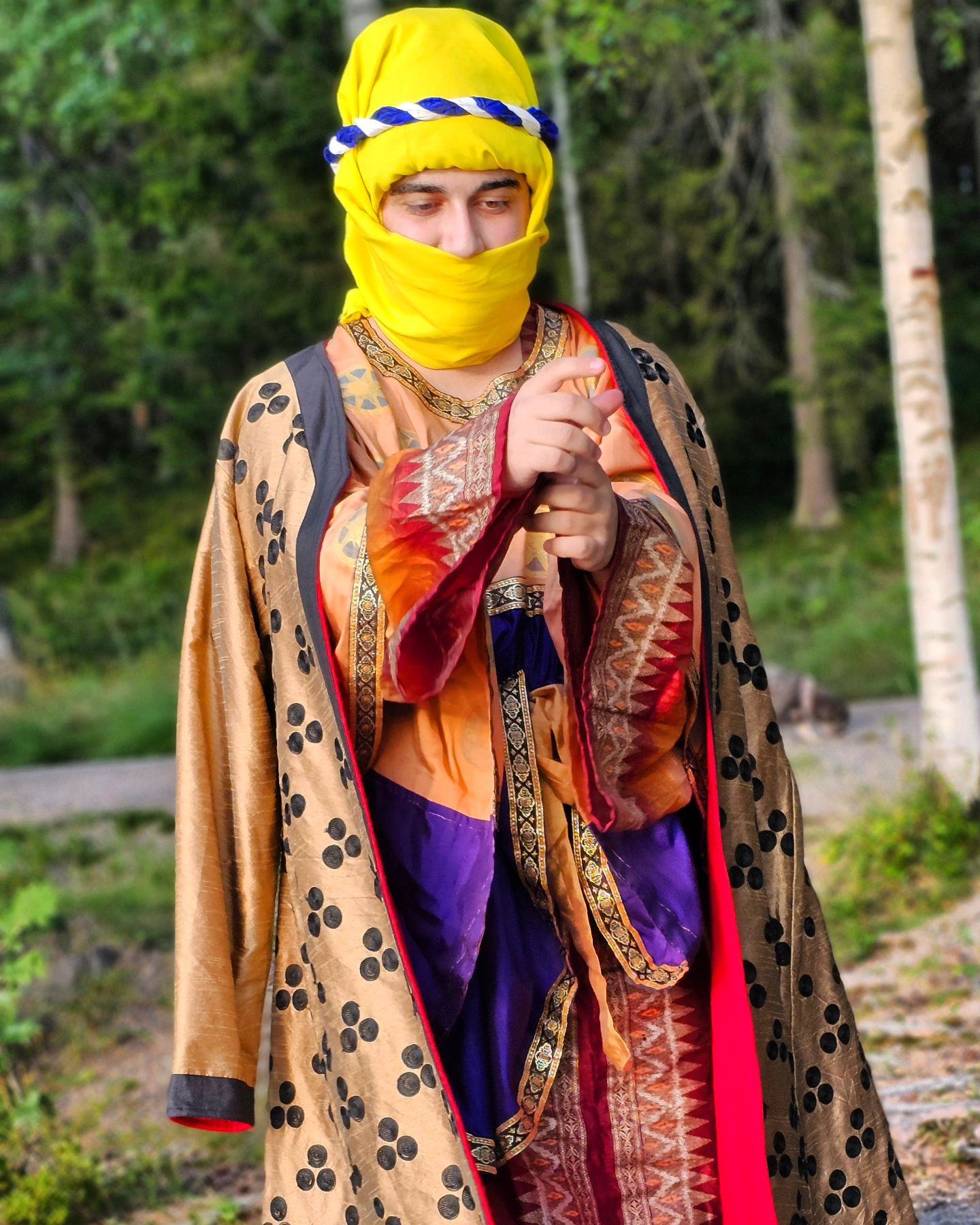
Modern reconstruction of Achaemenid era Persian noble attire featuring the "Kandys" and wearing the Medo-Persian headwear known as a "Tiara"

A kandys, plural kandyes (Ancient Greek: κάνδυς, plural κᾰ́νδῠες, probably from Old Persian * kandu "mantle, cover"), also called candys, kantuš, or Median robe, is a type of three-quarter-length Persian coat. It originally described a leather cloak with sleeves worn by men, but evolved into a garment worn by Athenian women. The kandys is sometimes compared to the much later 17th-19th century military pelisse as worn by Hussars, in the sense that it was a sleeved jacket or coat worn cloak-style.

== Semantics ==
It is suggested that the term kandys / candys was probably an Iranian word that was appropriated by the Greeks to describe the Persian garment, which in Old Persian would have been called kandu (cloak). Other terms in languages of Ancient Iran include kanzu-ka (Median), kan-su-ka (Elamite) and gnjwg (Parthian), all of which correspond with the term cloak. The prefix 'kan-', in such languages, means to cover or to throw, as in a coat thrown around the shoulders. Although some sources have suggested a link to kontusz, the Polish term for a greatcoat, the link is anachronistic and not considered credible.

== Persian usage ==
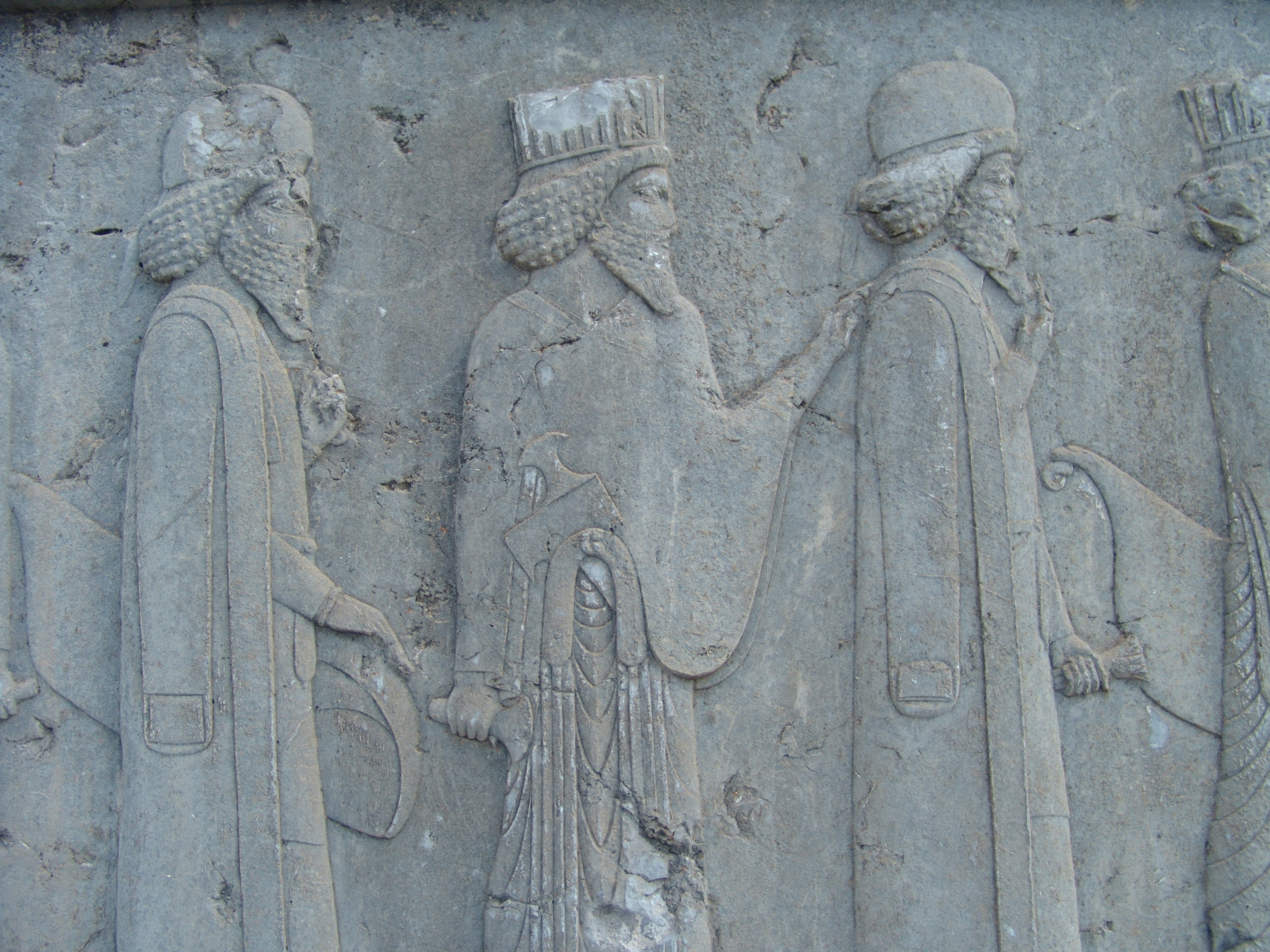
Detail of a relief showing two men (left and right) wearing kandys. Apadana of Persepolis, 550-330 BC.

The earliest evidence of the sleeved kandys is found on a 9th-century BC Iranian bronze stand excavated at Teppe Hasanlu, while garments have been found in 4th and 5th century BC Scythian graves showing that the sleeves were so narrow and placed in such a manner that they could not realistically function as sleeves. The kandys was worn as a cloak rather than a coat, except in the presence of the King for inspections, when the arms were placed in the kandys's overlong or sewn-up sleeves. This has been interpreted as a precaution against assassination attempts. The Persian kandys was often purple, or made from leather and skins. Since 1990 the Encyclopædia Iranica has stated that most people believe that the candys, along with a long-sleeved coat called a sárapis and long trousers called anaxyrides, formed part of the riding dress of the Medes people and is represented by the mantle with hanging empty sleeves portrayed in the Persepolis reliefs. These reliefs are also used as evidence for the theory that the Persian kandys may have acted as a status garment, as it is shown being worn by Iranian nobility, but not by their servants.

== Greek usage ==
The kandys, now made with sleeves, was historically worn by Greek women, particularly in Athens, in the 4th century BC, and towards the end of the 5th century BC. At this time, fashions were increasingly influenced by imports from the East and Asia Minor. Among the more typical chitons and himatia that Athenian women dedicated to Artemis at Brauron were six kandyes, mostly described as being patterned. One of these was dedicated in 347 BC, although no dates were given for the other dedications, and Margaret C. Miller suggests they must date no later than the early 4th century BC. In Greece, the six kandyes linked with Brauron also had special significance - two were chosen to adorn the cult statue, one may have been made of silk, and another is described as ornamented with gold. Miller notes that one was made from linen, which was considered unusual enough to mention in the lists, in contrast to the leather used for Persian kandyes, and suggests the use of Greek-made linen means that kandyes were made in Greece as well as potentially imported from Persia. At odds with the concept of the kandys as a symbol of luxury is an interpretation from the 1990s where the kandys is described as reflecting non-Attic and slave status. Towards the end of the 5th century BC, Miller noted a surge in the number of depictions of Athenian women and children wearing kandys-like garments. While girls wore them as overgarments, small boys wore them open and without undergarments. One suggestion was that the kandys was dedicated prior to marriage, as a child's garment, but Miller notes that this interpretation is challenged by the use of husband's names in the Brauronian lists, and that contemporary vase paintings show mature women wearing kandyes.

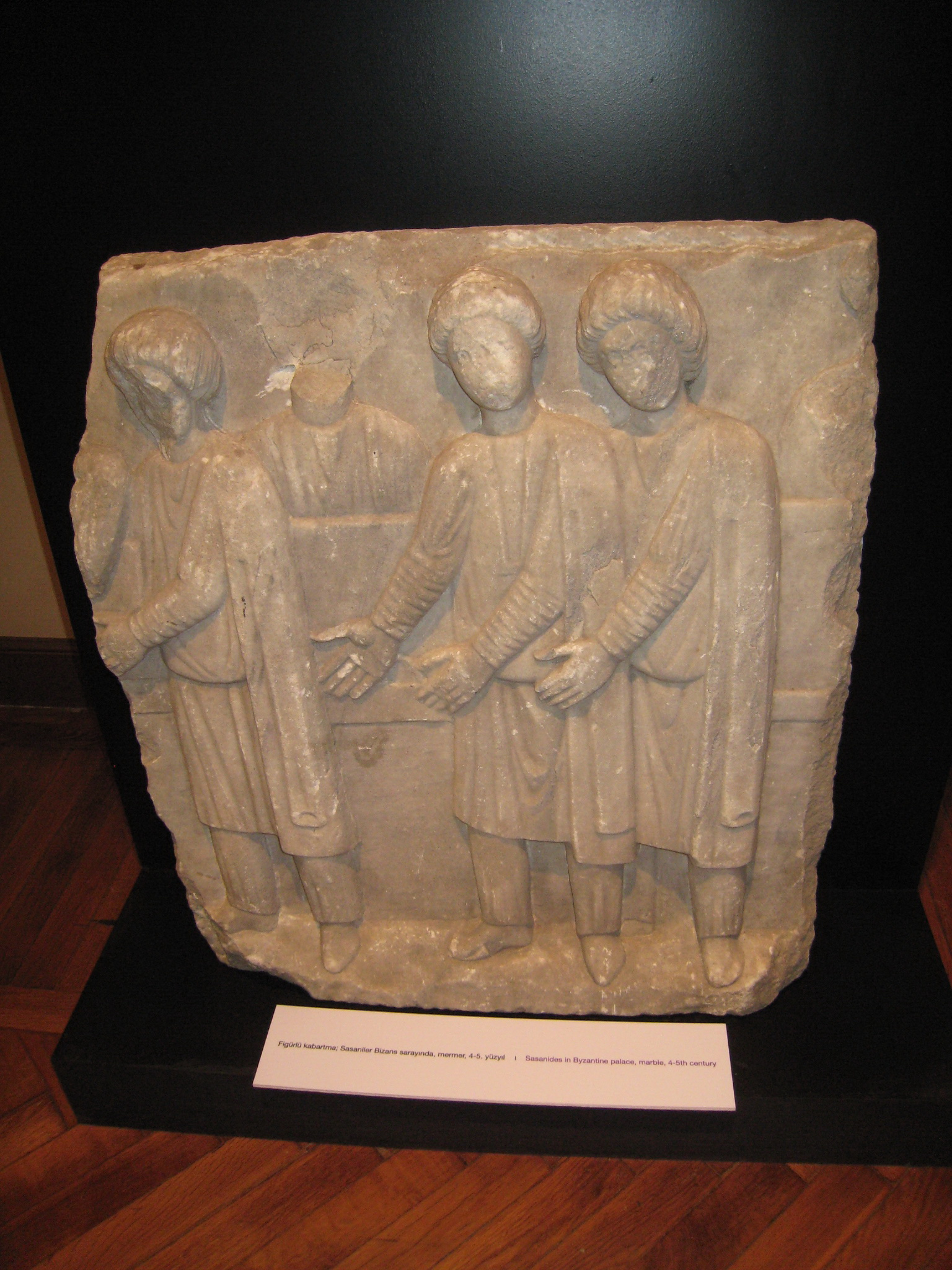
Sasanian embassy to Byzantine Empire, stone relief in Istanbul Archaeological Museums, Turkey
