= Nebris (mythology) =

Animal skin worn as a garment

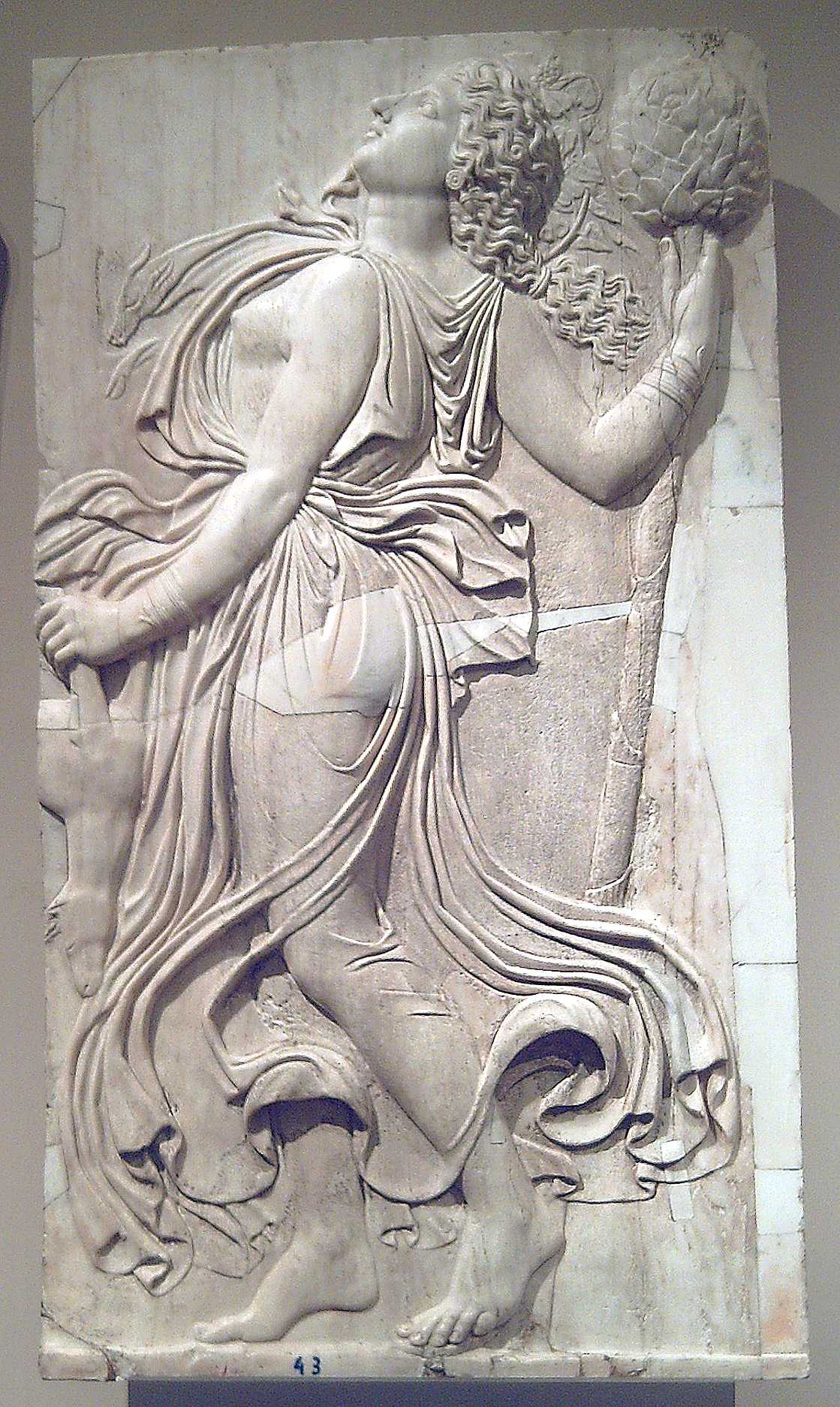
A maenad with a nebris (and a thyrsus)

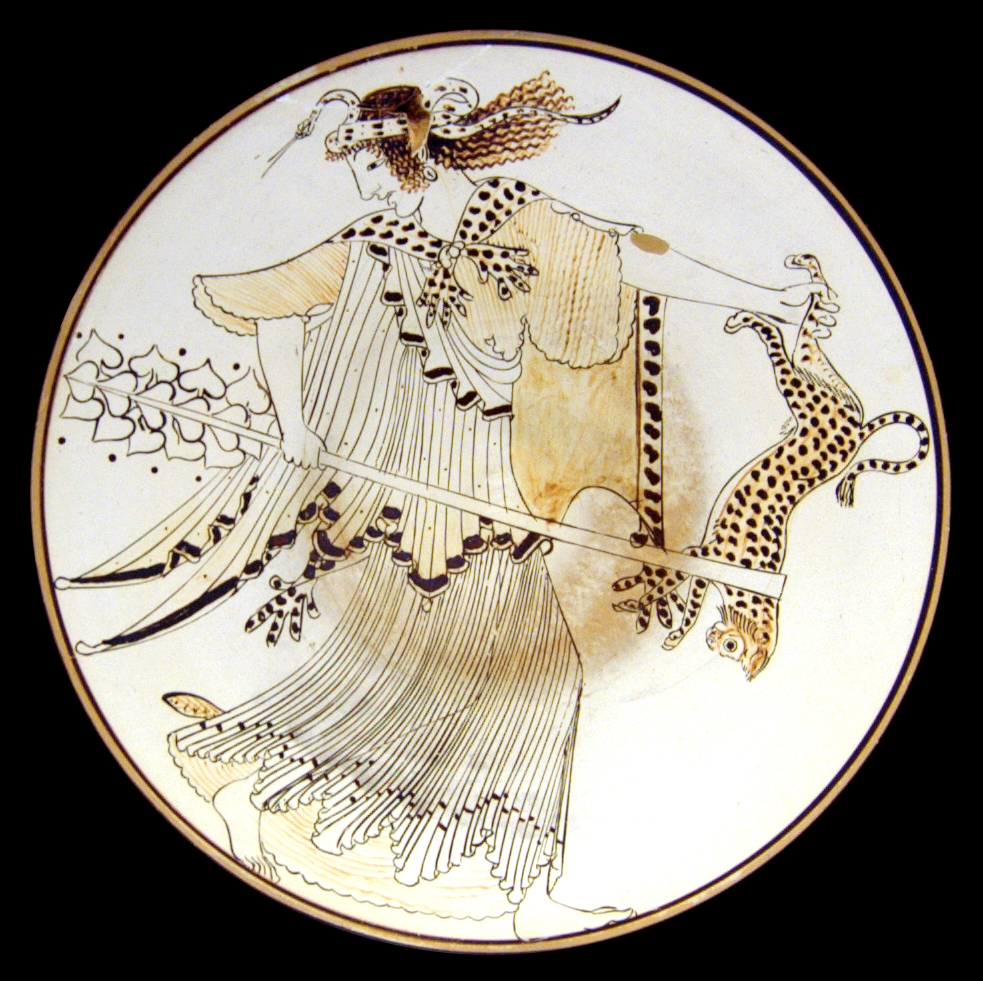
Maenad with a Nebris

Nebris (νεβρίς; or nebride, from νεβρός, ‘fawn’) is the skin of a young deer, similar to an aegis, originally worn as a hunter's clothing item and later attributed to Dionysus (Euripides, Le Baccanti, 99, 125, 157, 790; Aristophanes, Le rane, 1209; Dionigi il Periegeta, 702, 946; Rufo Festo Avieno, 1.129).

As a young boy, Dionysus was wrapped in such a brown, brightly spotted fur as protection against Hera, who was seeking his life because he was the son of Zeus and a mortal woman, Semele. Accordingly, the nebris was adopted by his followers in processions and ceremonies that were held in his honor during the liturgical celebrations of the Dionysia.

In works of ancient art it is seen not only on maenads and male bacchantes, but also on figures of Pan and satyrs. It is commonly worn in the same way as the aegis, or goatskin, by tying the two front legs over the right shoulder in order to allow the body of the skin to cover the left side of the wearer. A woodcut from the work Vases by Sir William Hamilton (I, 37), reproduces a priestess of Bacchus in the act of offering a nebris to the god or one of his ministers.
