= Antigenidas of Orchomenus =

Antigenidas, son of Simylus, (fl. 4th century BC) was a cavalryman from Orchomenus, who served with Alexander's allied cavalry until the expedition reached Ecbatana in 330 BC. There he and his compatriots were discharged. On their return around 329, they made a dedication to Zeus Soter in Orchomenus.
