= Crepida =

Ancient Greek footwear

Crepida (crepis or krepis; Ancient Greek: κρηπίς), also known as Crepidula, was a type of footwear similar to a sandal, but distinct from a basic sandal. It served as a middle form between a fully enclosed boot and a simple sandal. Originally, it was worn by peasants and featured a thick, sturdy sole, often reinforced with nails. Some versions had metal plates made of lead or bronze, these were called Chian crepides (Χῖαι κρηπῖδες). A follower of Alexander the Great, Hagnon, is even said to have worn crepidae that had gold or silver nails.

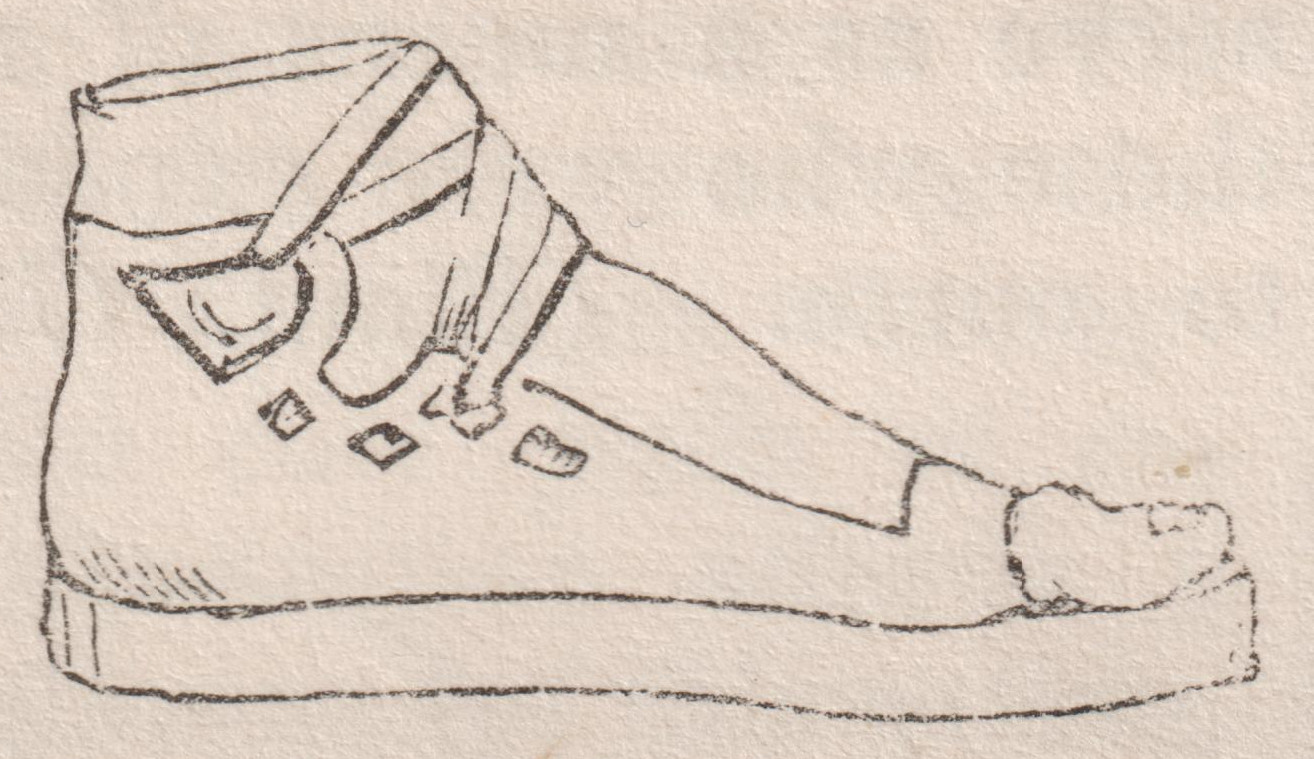
Crepida by Anthony Rich, Illustrated Companion to the Latin Dictionary, and Greek Lexicon, p. 213

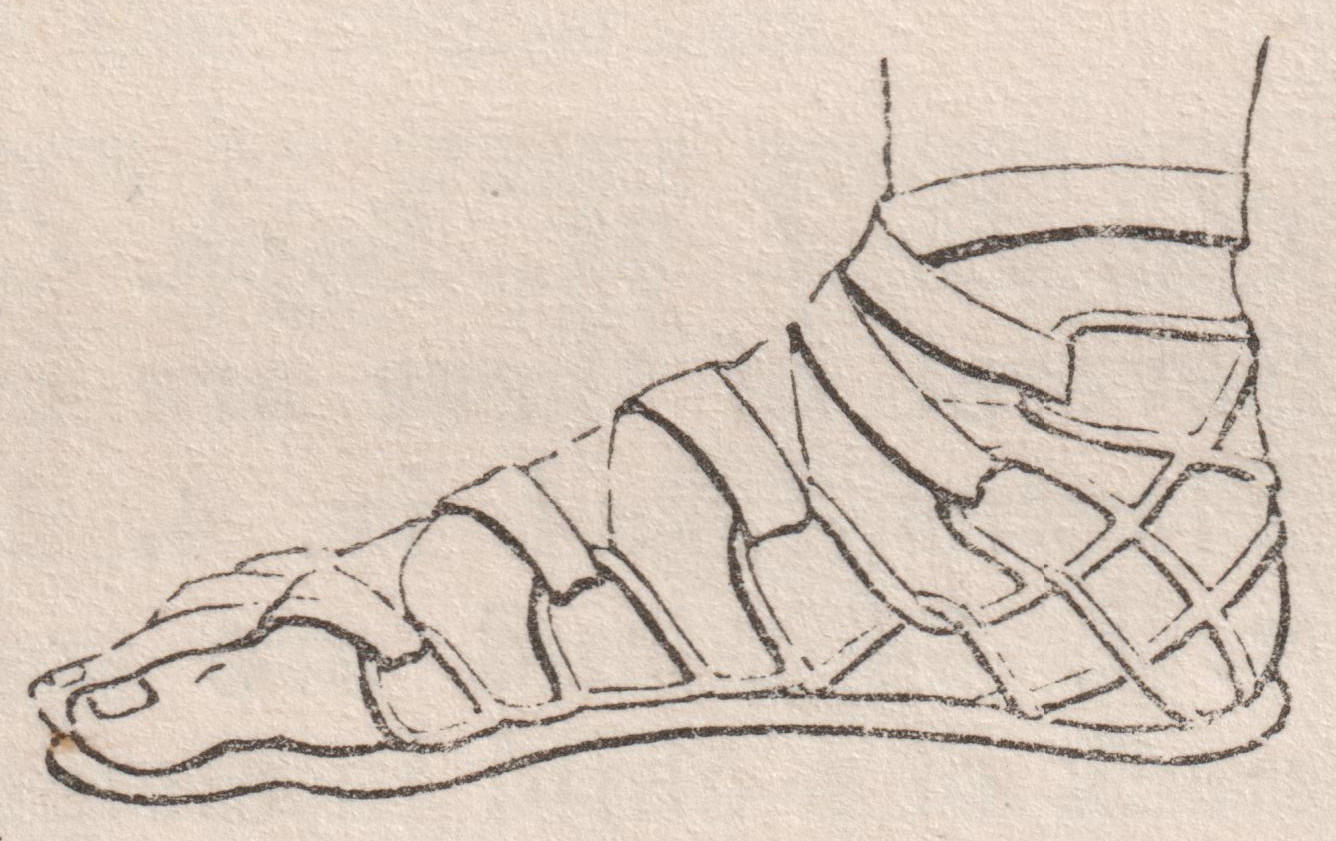
Crepida by Anthony Rich, Illustrated Companion to the Latin Dictionary, and Greek Lexicon, p. 213

The design sometimes included a low upper with small loops, through which straps were threaded to secure the shoe over the foot. These straps could be ornamental, dyed purple or set with jewels. The upper part was made of several large loops, forming an open, net-like covering over the top of the foot, this open-laced style is likely why Lucian referred to them with the term πολυς χιδές ("many parted"). In some cases, the back of the shoe was closed, possibly referred to as opisthokrepis (ὀπισθοκρηπὶς). Some special types of crepidae had a fixed number of loops.

In vase paintings, young men are sometimes shown wearing crepidae with straps that go halfway up the calf. These shoes could be worn on either foot and were typically made of leather. Archaeological finds include lamps shaped like crepidae or caligae, complete with nail-studded soles.

The κρηπὶς was considered the national shoe of the Greeks, which is why Roman tragedies performed in Greek costume were referred to as "fabula crepidata". It is also mentioned as a type of military boot worn by the Macedonian army. The crepida was commonly worn with other Greek garments such as the pallium, chlamys and causia, and served to distinguish Greek attire from Roman fashion. Although the Romans eventually adopted it, as we can see from Suetonius who says about Emperor Tiberius that he set aside his Roman-style clothing and adopted to the Greek cloak (pallium) and sandals (crepidas): "Deposito patrio habitu redegit se ad pallium et crepidas."

In some contexts, it was also a soft shoe worn by women, likely lighter and more decorative than the rugged versions used by peasants or soldiers. Sophocles is said to have introduced white krepides for dancers in the chorus and actors playing women or effeminate roles, though these were likely still based on the peasant-style shoe with elevated soles.

The Suda notes that the word “crepidoumenos” (κρηπιδούμενος), meaning “putting on crepides,” can be used in place of the full phrase "ὑποδούμενος τὰς κρηπῖδας," which has the same meaning.

According to the Suda, the term “monocrepidi” (μονοκρήπιδι) (“with one crepis/shoe”) is explained in connection with Hermes and Perseus. It states that Hermes gave Perseus one of his shoes as he was going to cut off the head of Medusa, leaving him with only one shoe. This is linked to an offering made to Hermes in the dative case after a dream. However, historians clarify that the myth of the single sandal is traditionally connected to Jason, not Perseus, and that this passage likely reflects some confusion or blending of myths.

The word κρηπίς could also refer to a type of cake or pancake filled with fruit.

Additionally, the term crepida was used to describe a raised walkway or pavement along the side of a street, designed for pedestrian use.
