= Antigenidas of Thebes =

Antigenidas or Antigenides of Thebes (Ancient Greek: Ἀντιγενίδης; fl. 4th century BC), the musician, son of Satyrus or Dionysius, was a celebrated Greek aulos-player, and also a poet. He lived in the time of Alexander the Great. His two daughters, Melo and Satyra, who followed the profession of their father, are mentioned in an epigram of the Greek Anthology. Gian Francesco Malipiero, Italian musician of the 20th century, composed an honorary Sinfonia per Antigenida in 1962.
