= John William Godward =

English painter (1861–1922)

- Born: 9 August 1861; Wimbledon, England, United Kingdom of Great Britain and Ireland
- Died: 13 December 1922 (aged 61); Fulham, London, United Kingdom
- Resting place: Brompton Cemetery, West London
- Known for: Painting, drawing
- Movement: Neo-Classicism, Academism
- Patrons: Lawrence Alma-Tadema

John William Godward (9 August 1861 – 13 December 1922) was an English painter from the end of the Neo-Classicist era. He was a protégé of Sir Lawrence Alma-Tadema, but his style of painting fell out of favour with the rise of modern art.

== Early life ==
Godward was born in 1861 and lived in Wilton Grove, Wimbledon. He was born to Sarah Eboral and John Godward (an investment clerk at the Law Life Assurance Society, London). The eldest of five children, he was named after his father John and grandfather William, and was christened at St Mary's Church, Battersea on 17 October 1861. The overbearing behaviour of his parents made him reclusive and shy later in adulthood.

== Career ==
He exhibited at the Royal Academy from 1887. His growing popularity allowed him to move out of his parents' home to a studio in Chelsea, which he outfitted with antiques and marble statues to inform his painting. In 1912, Godward moved to Italy with one of his models, ultimately settling in Rome, near the Villa Borghese. Disliking his move to Italy, his family broke off all contact with him and even cut his image from family pictures.

Godward returned to England in 1921, but suffered from poor health and depression, and his output declined sharply. In 1922, less than one year after his return, Godward committed suicide at age 61. He was buried in Brompton Cemetery, West London. His estranged family, who had disapproved of his becoming an artist, were ashamed of his suicide and burned his papers. Only one photograph of Godward is known to survive.

One of his best-known paintings is Dolce far Niente (1904), which was purchased for the collection of Andrew Lloyd Webber in 1995. As in the case of several other paintings, Godward painted more than one version; in this case, an earlier (and less well-known) 1897 version with a further 1906 version.

== Works ==
Godward was a Victorian Neo-Classicist, and therefore, in theory, a follower of Frederic Leighton. However, he is more closely allied stylistically to Sir Lawrence Alma-Tadema, with whom he shared a penchant for the rendering of Classical architecture – in particular, static landscape features constructed from marble.

The vast majority of Godward's extant images feature women in Classical dress posed against landscape features, although there are some semi-nude and fully nude figures included in his oeuvre, a notable example being In The Tepidarium (1913), a title shared with a controversial Alma-Tadema painting of the same subject that resides in the Lady Lever Art Gallery. The titles reflect Godward's source of inspiration: Classical civilization, most notably that of Ancient Rome (again, a subject binding Godward closely to Alma-Tadema artistically).

Given that Classical scholarship was more widespread among the potential audience for his paintings during his lifetime than in the present day, meticulous research of detail was important in order to attain a standing as an artist in this genre. Alma-Tadema was an archaeologist as well as a painter, who attended historical sites and collected artifacts he later used in his paintings: Godward, too, studied such details as architecture and dress, in order to ensure that his works bore the stamp of authenticity.

In addition, Godward painstakingly and meticulously rendered other important features in his paintings, animal skins (the paintings Noon Day Rest (1910) and A Cool Retreat (1910) contains examples of such rendition) and wildflowers (Nerissa (1906) and Summer Flowers (1903) are again examples of this).

The appearance of beautiful women in studied poses in so many of Godward's canvases causes many newcomers to his works to categorize him mistakenly as being Pre-Raphaelite, particularly as his palette is often a vibrantly colourful one. The choice of subject (ancient civilization versus, for example, Arthurian legend) is more properly that of the Victorian Neo-classicist. In common with numerous painters contemporary with him, Godward was a 'High Victorian Dreamer', producing images of an idealized and romanticized world that, in the case of both Godward and Alma-Tadema, came to be criticized as a world-view of 'Victorians in togas'.

Godward "quickly established a reputation for his paintings of young women in a classical setting and his ability to convey with sensitivity and technical mastery the feel of contrasting textures, flesh, marble, fur and fabrics." Godward's penchant for creating works of art set in the classical period probably came from the time period in which he was born. "The last full-scale classical revival in western painting bloomed in England in the 1860s and flowered there for the next three decades."

Today, Godward's works can be found in the J. Paul Getty Museum, Metropolitan Museum of Art, and British Museum, among others.

== Gallery ==
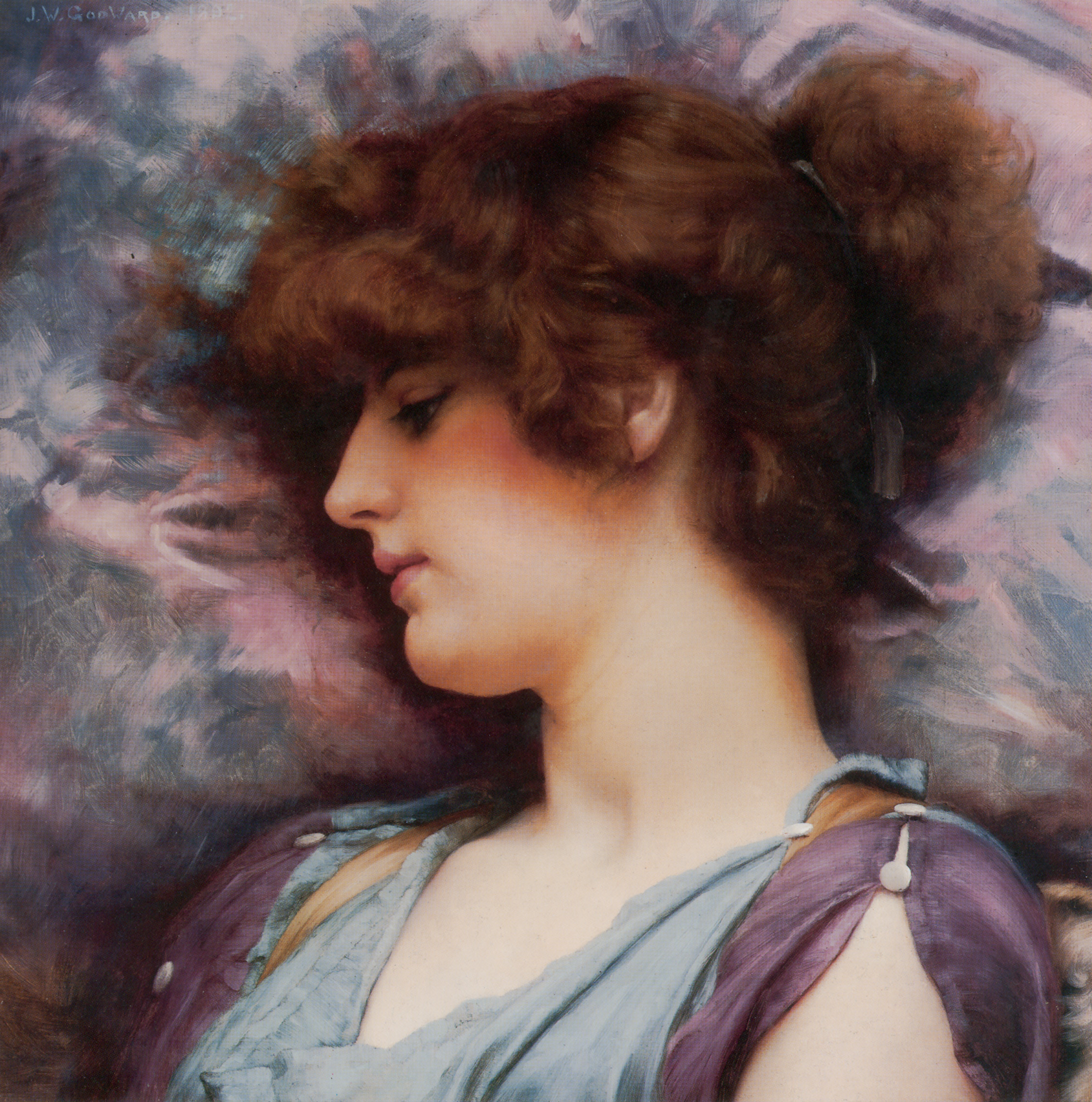
Far Away Thoughts, 1892

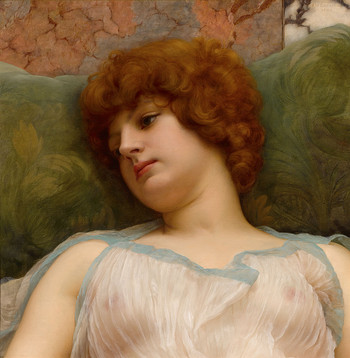
Idle Moments, 1895

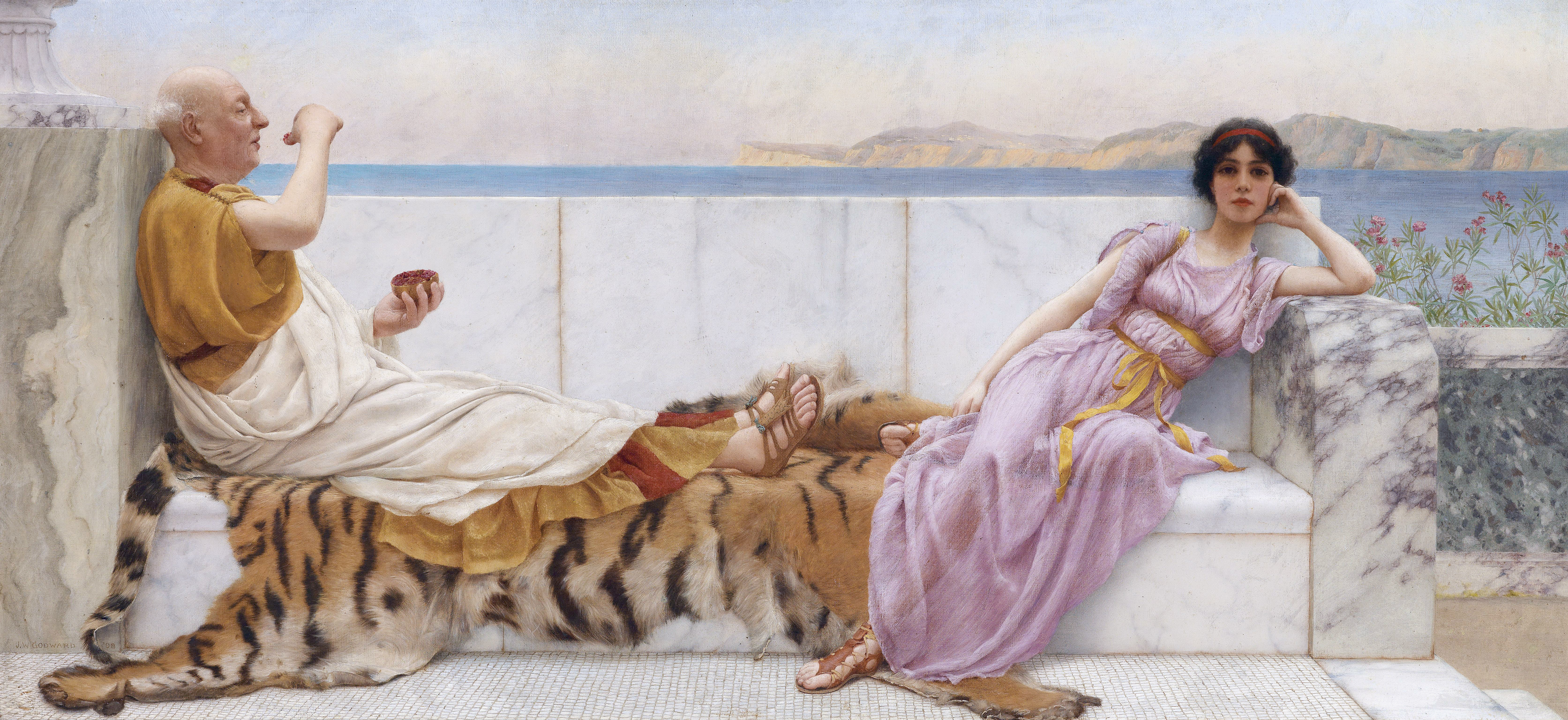
Eighty and eighteen, 1898

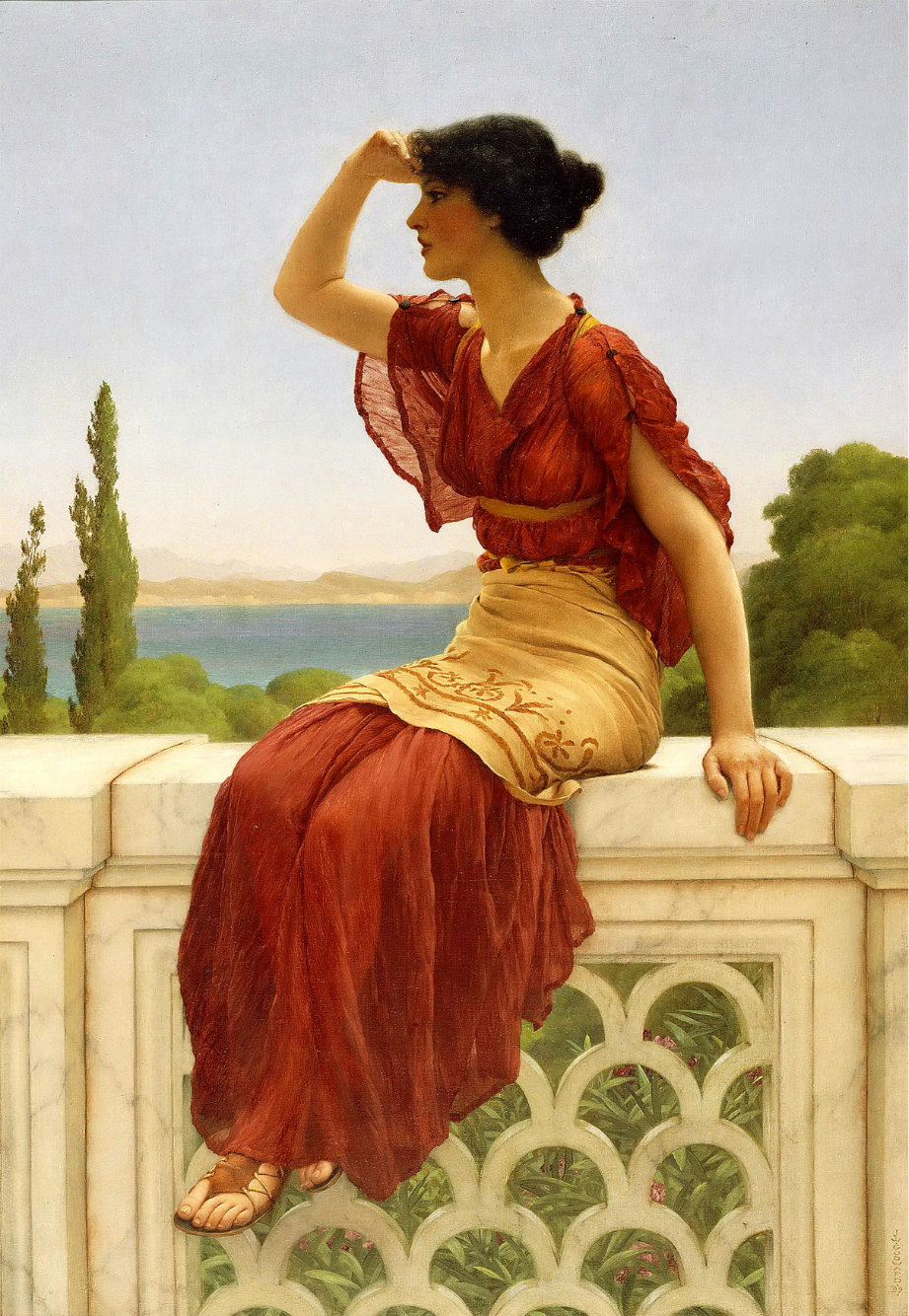
The Signal, 1899

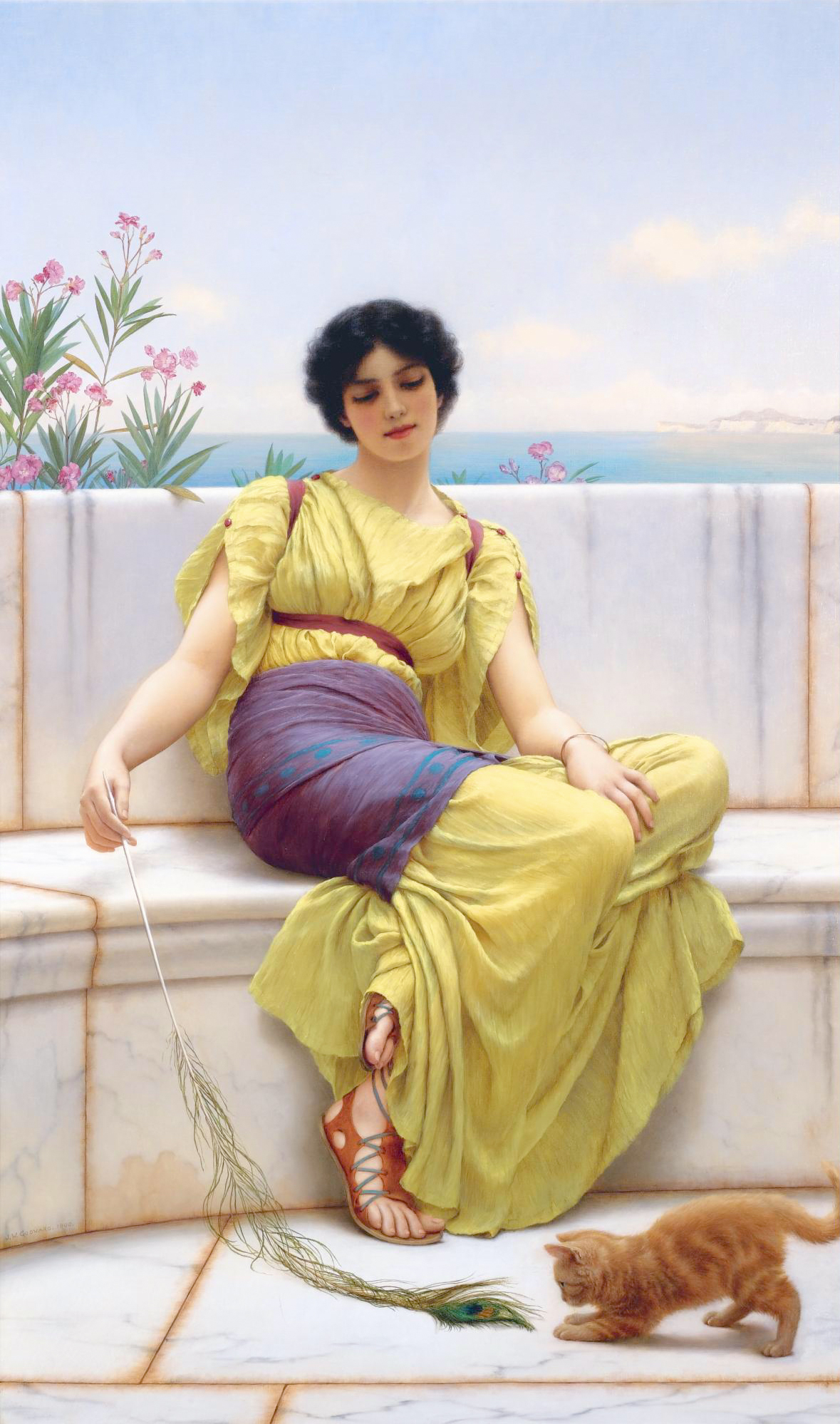
Idleness, 1900

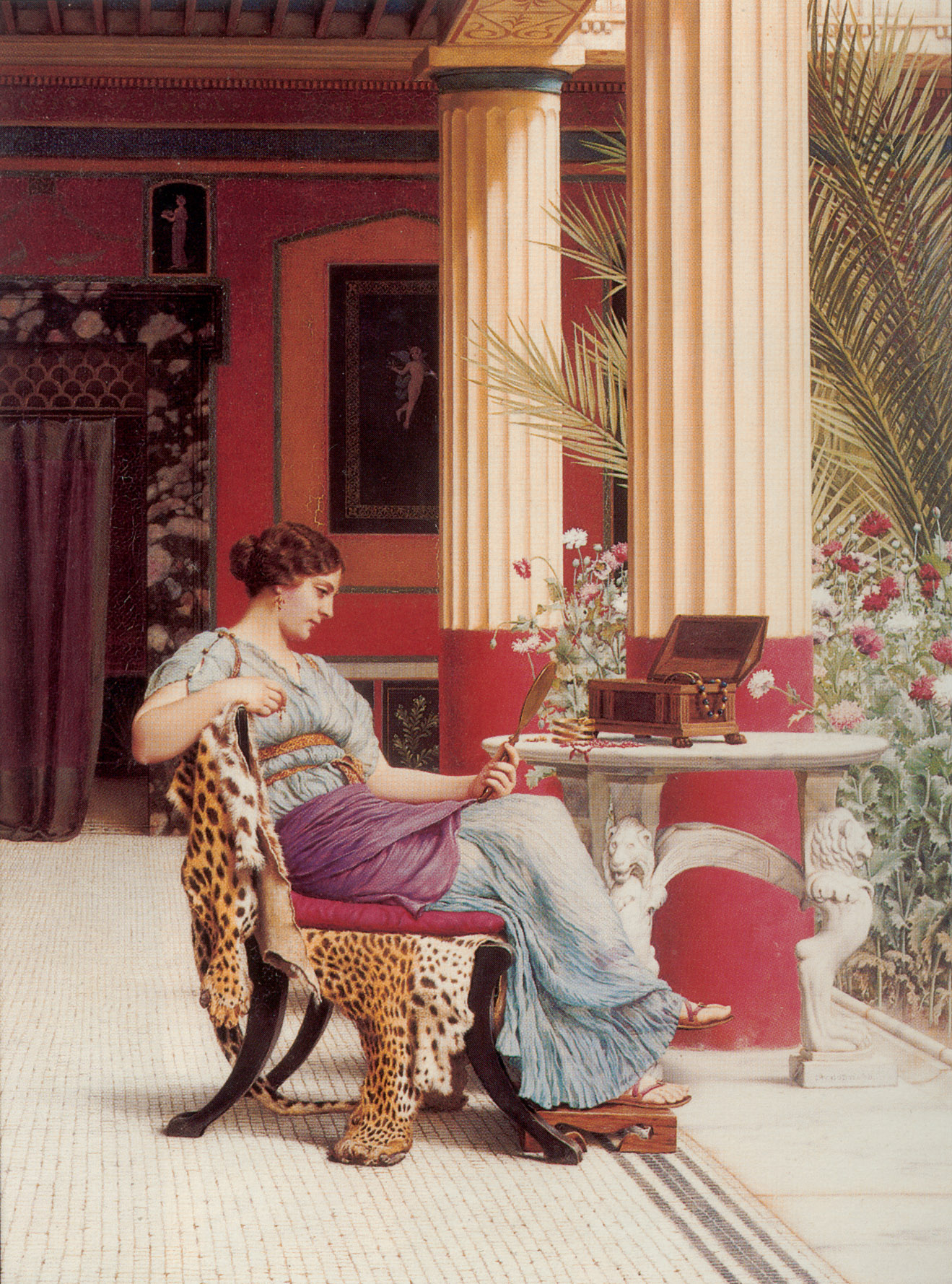
The Jewel Casket, 1900

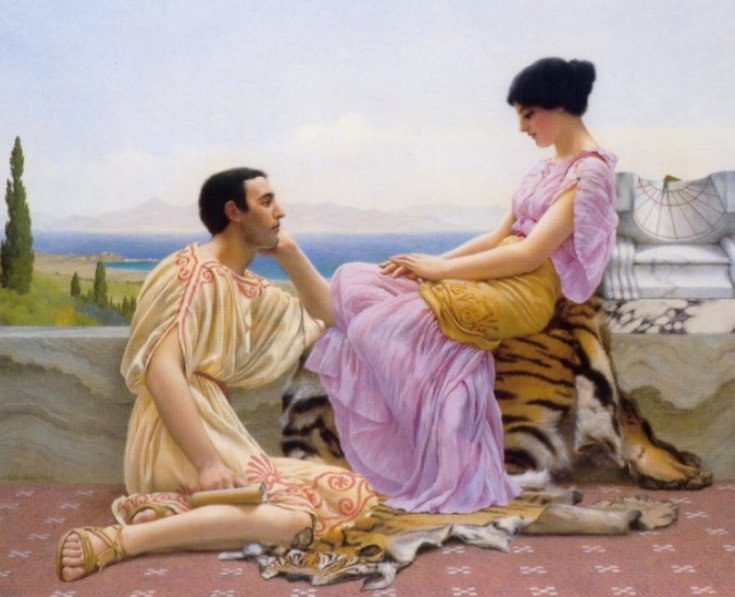
Youth and Time, 1901

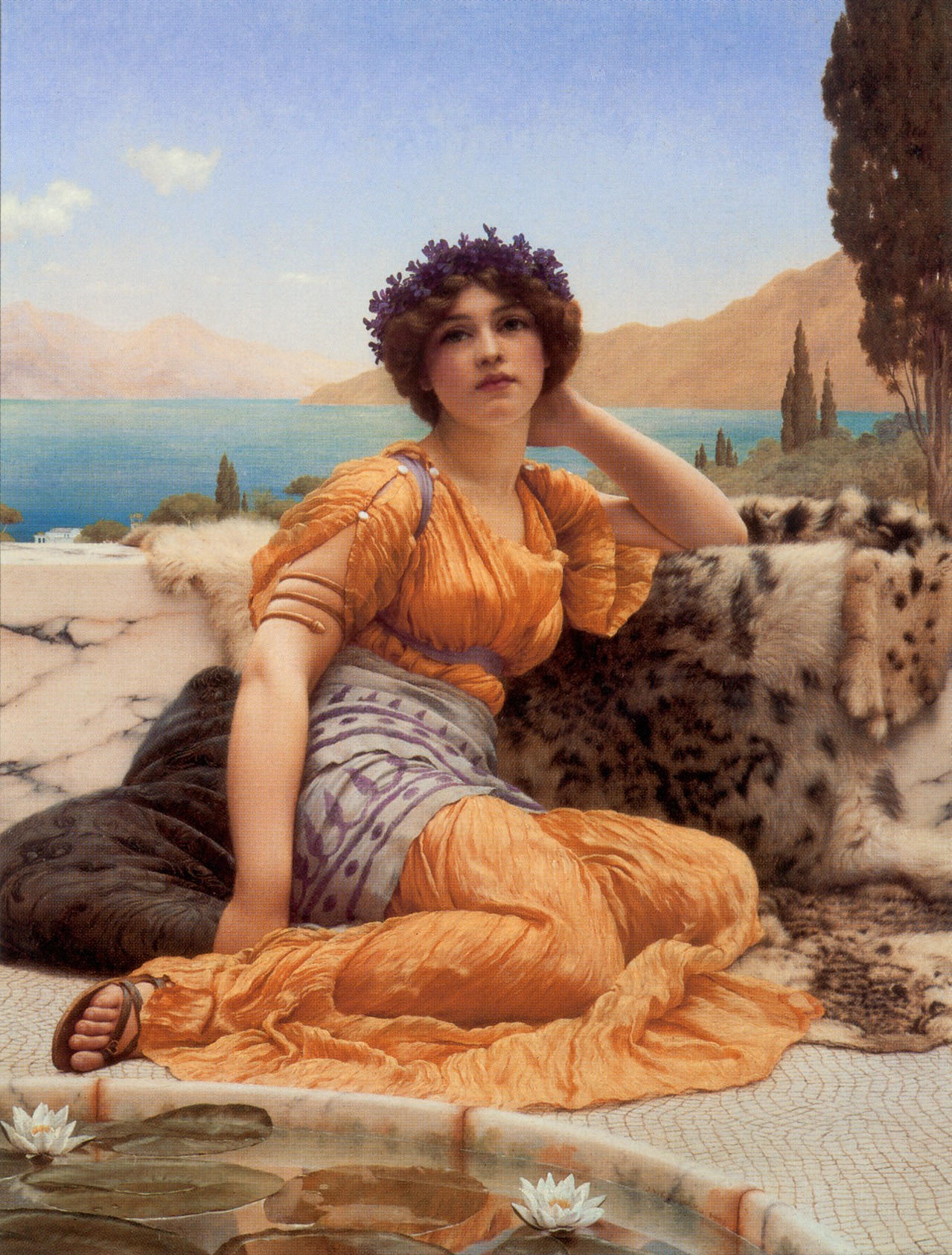
With Violets Wreathed and Robe of Saffron Hue, 1902

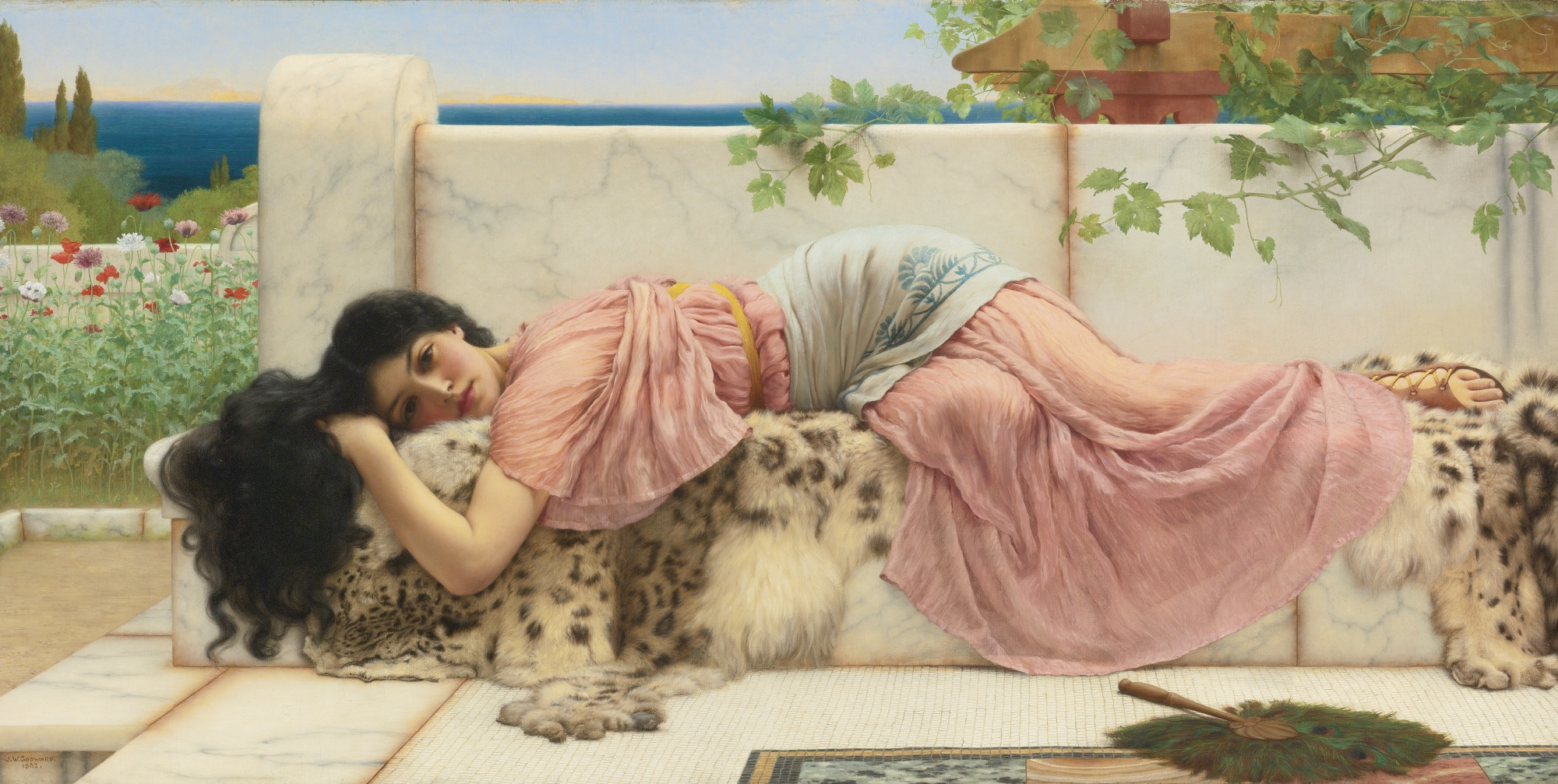
When the heart is young, 1902

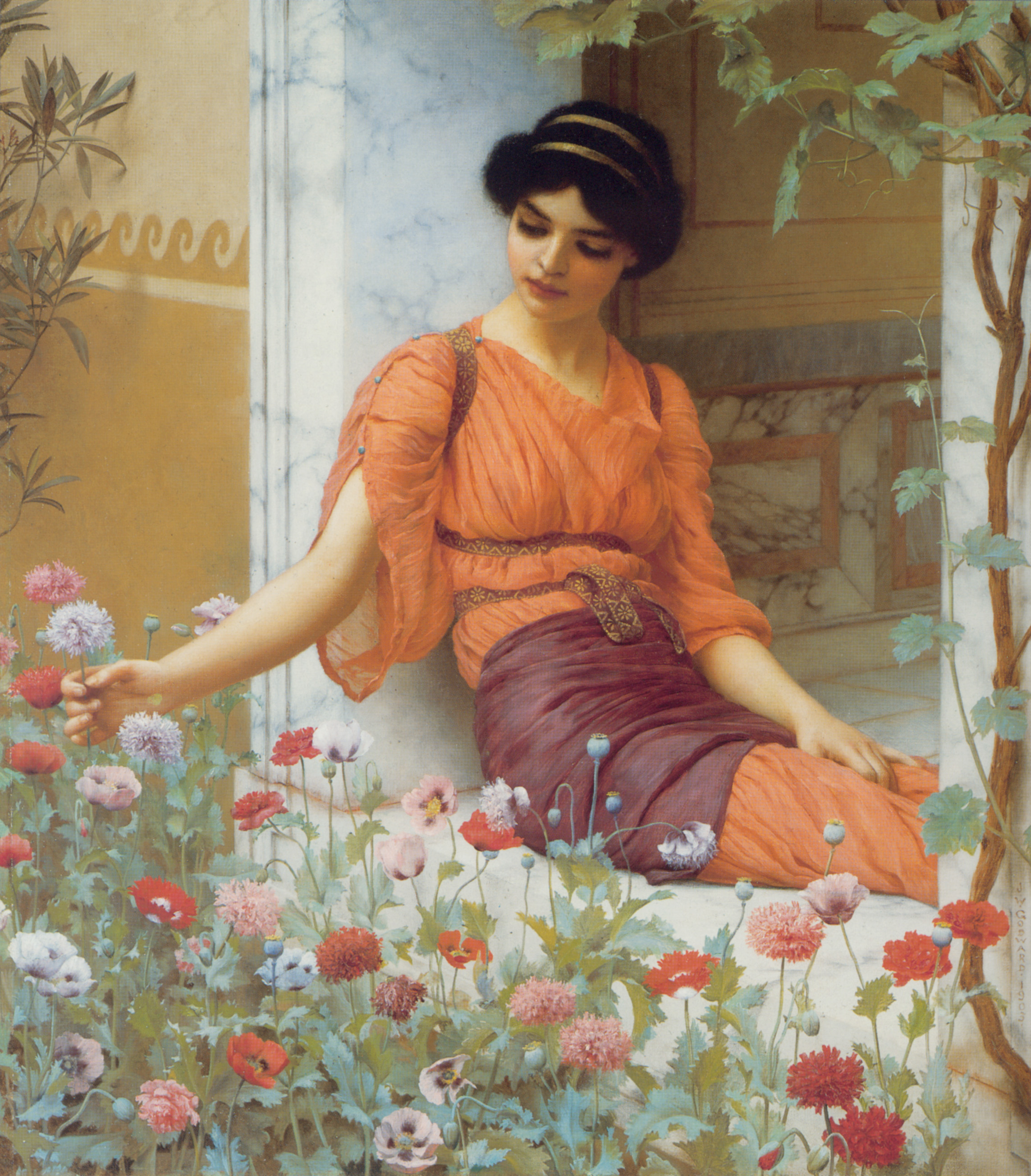
Summer Flowers, 1903

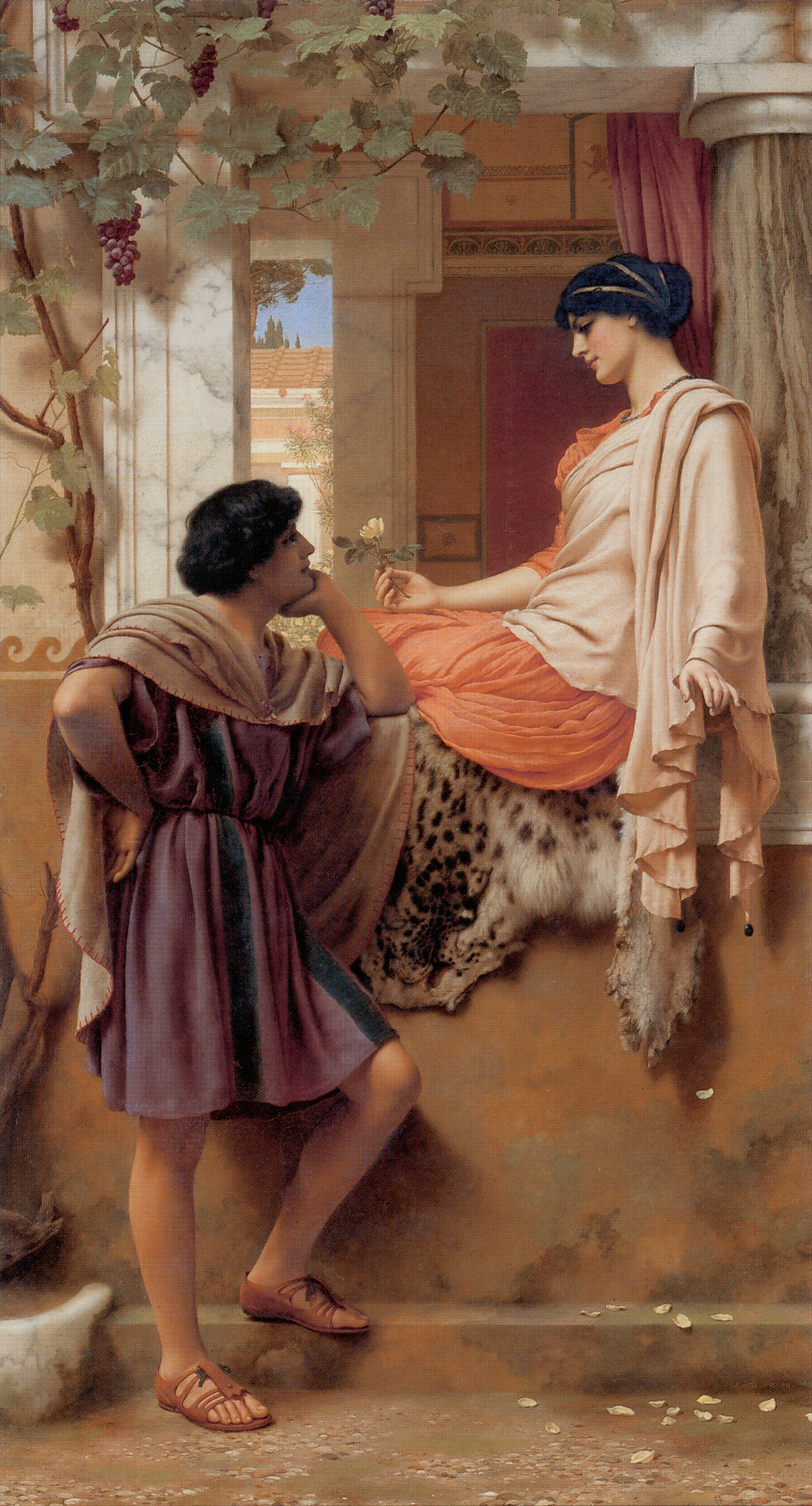
The Old Old Story, 1903

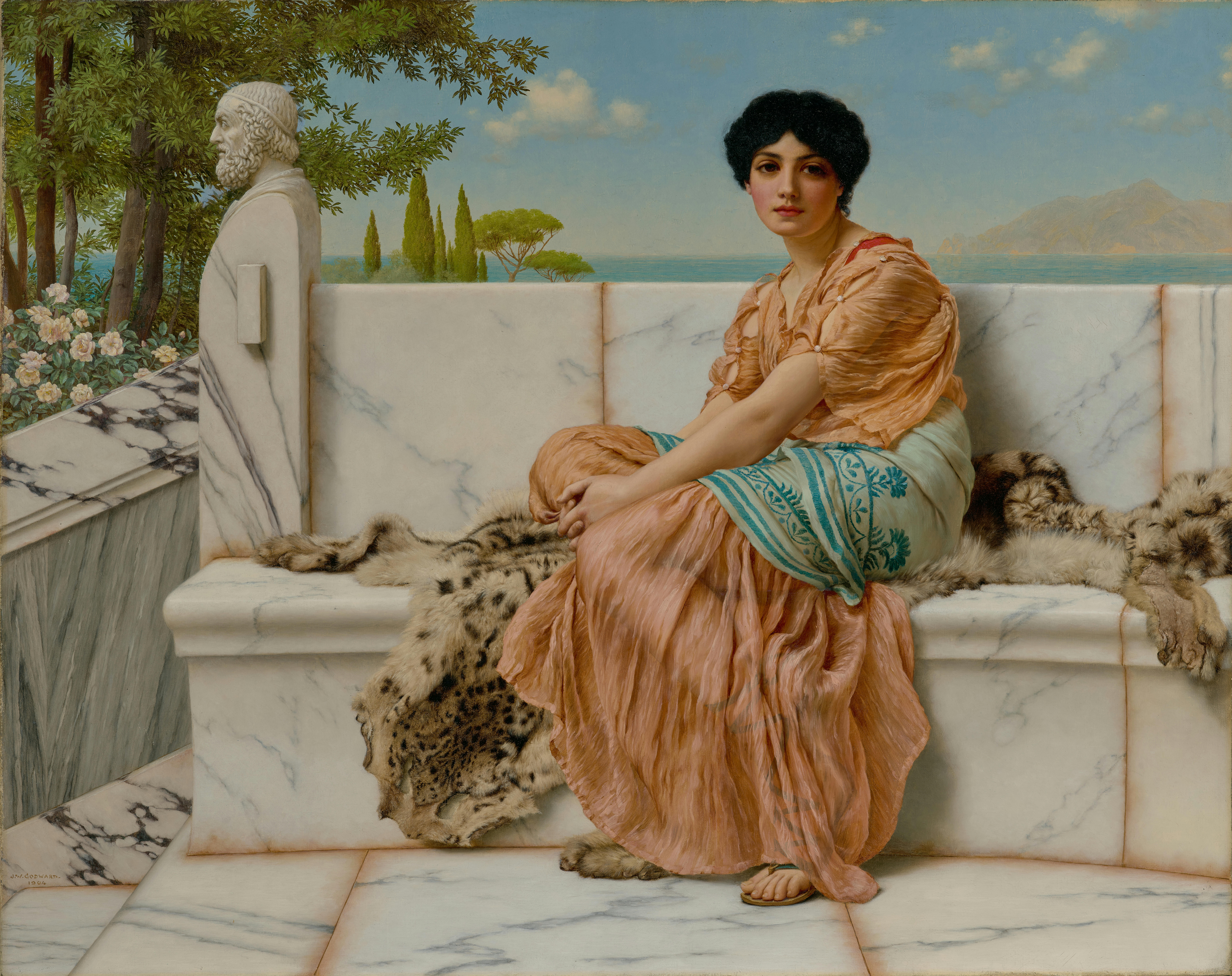
In the Days of Sappho, 1904

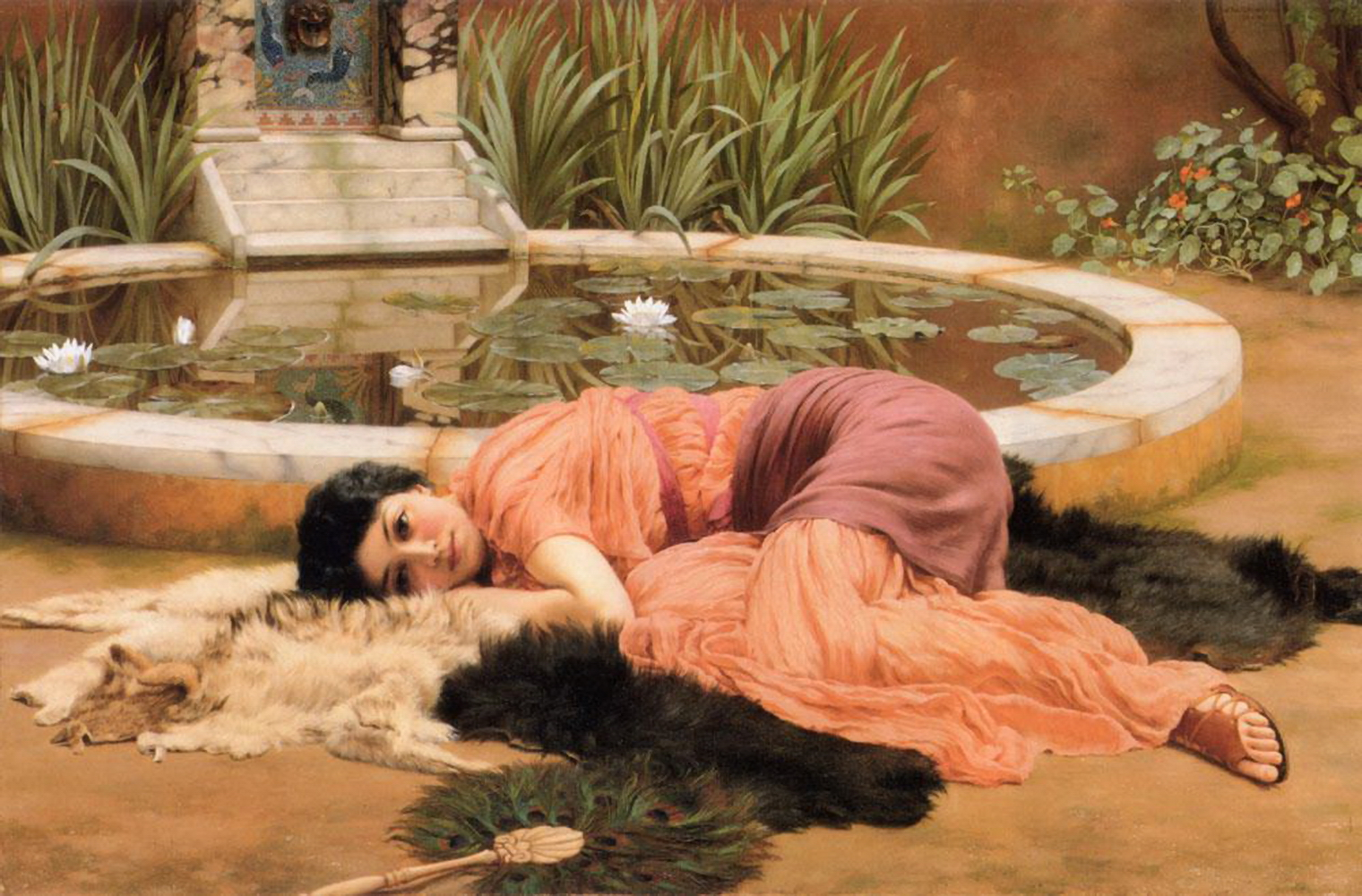
Dolce far Niente, 1904

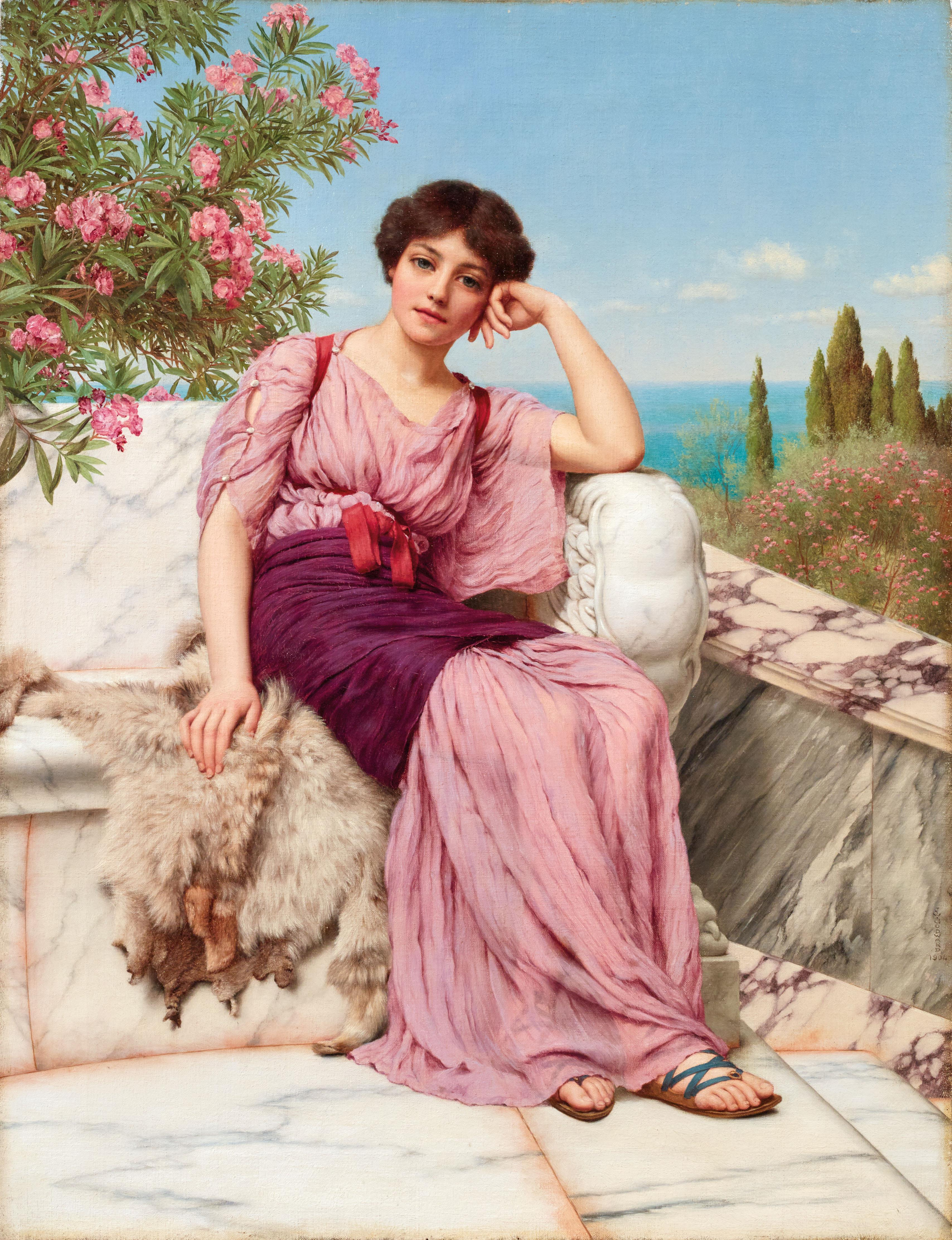
Sweet Dreams, 1904

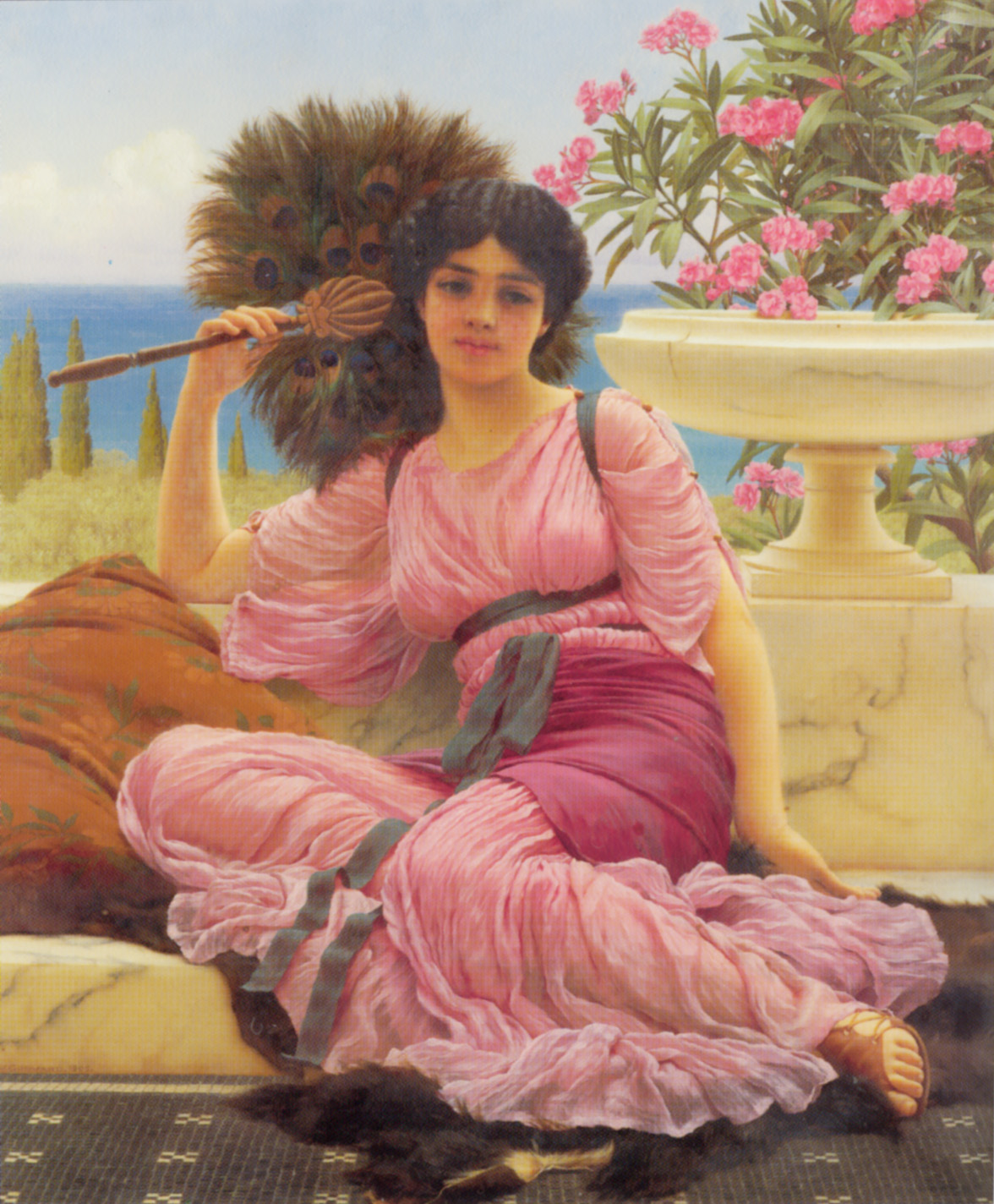
Flabellifera, 1905

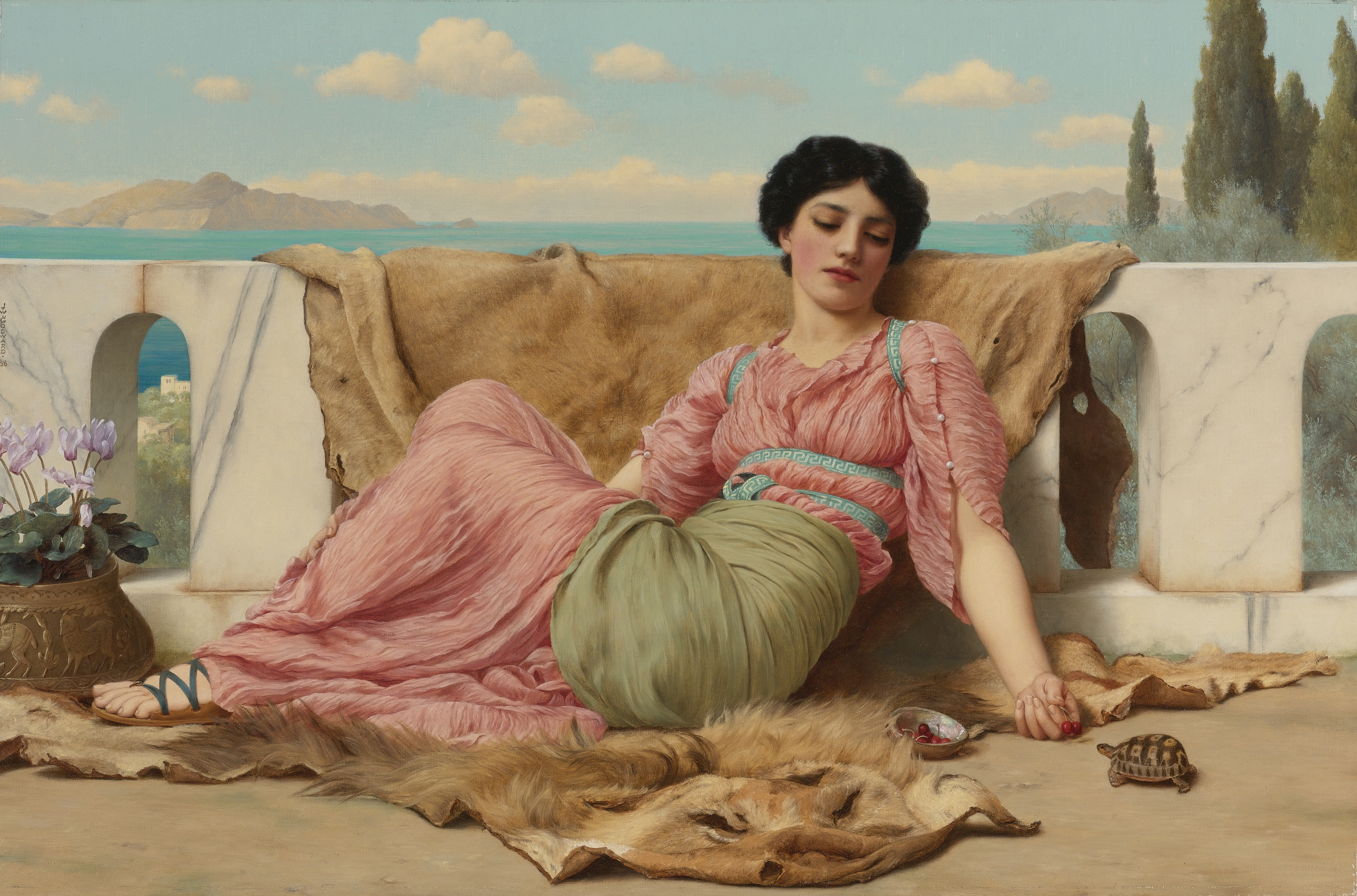
The quiet pet, 1906

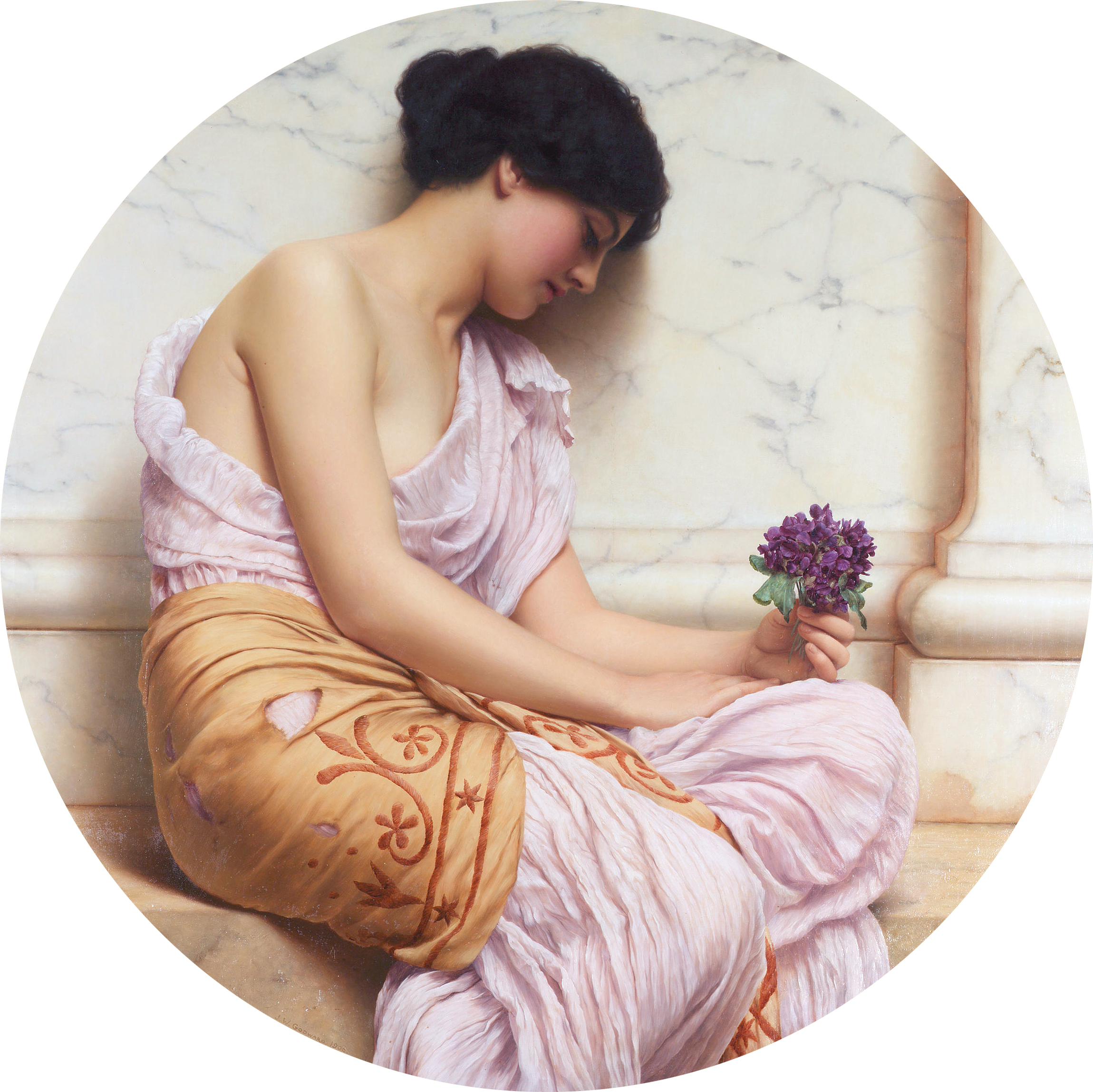
Violets, sweet violets, 1908

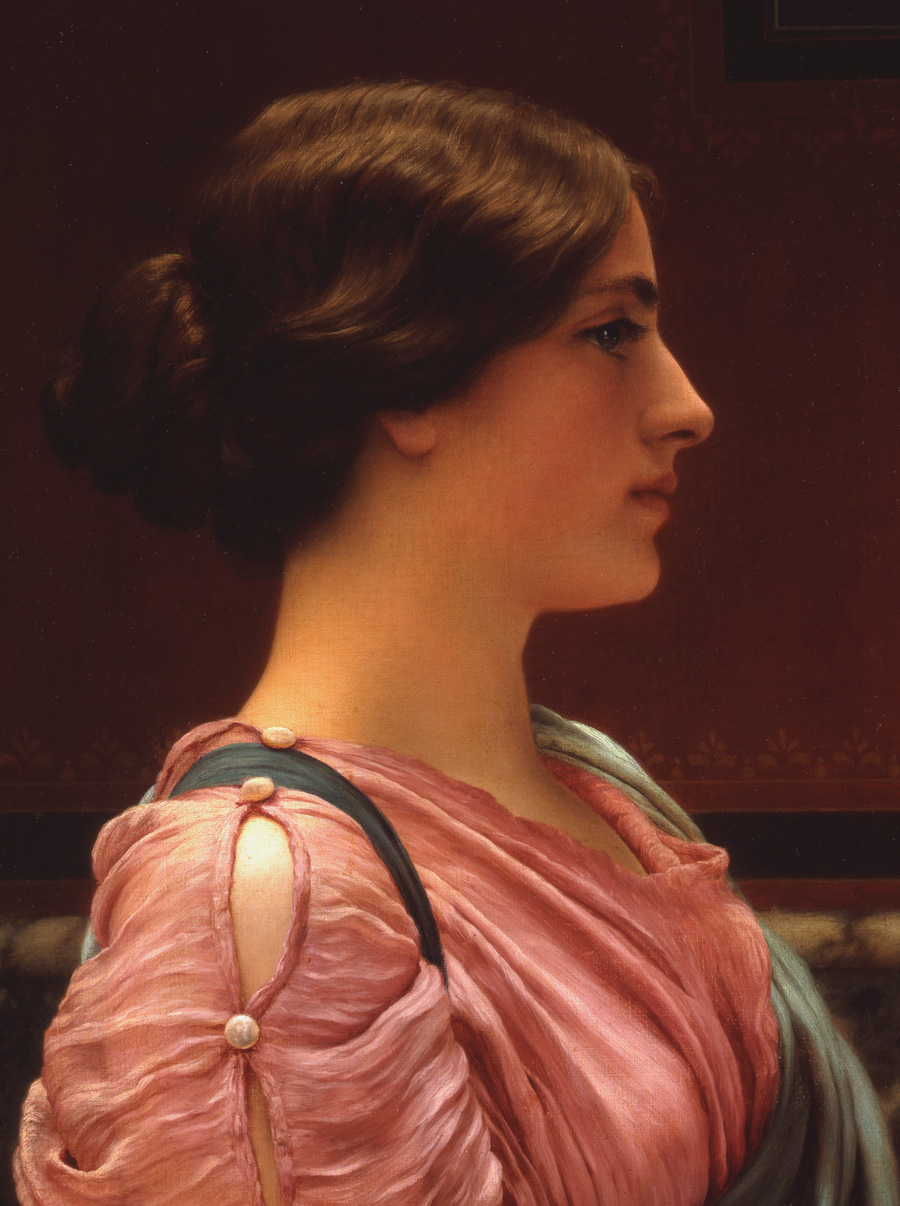
A Classical Beauty
Standing poses

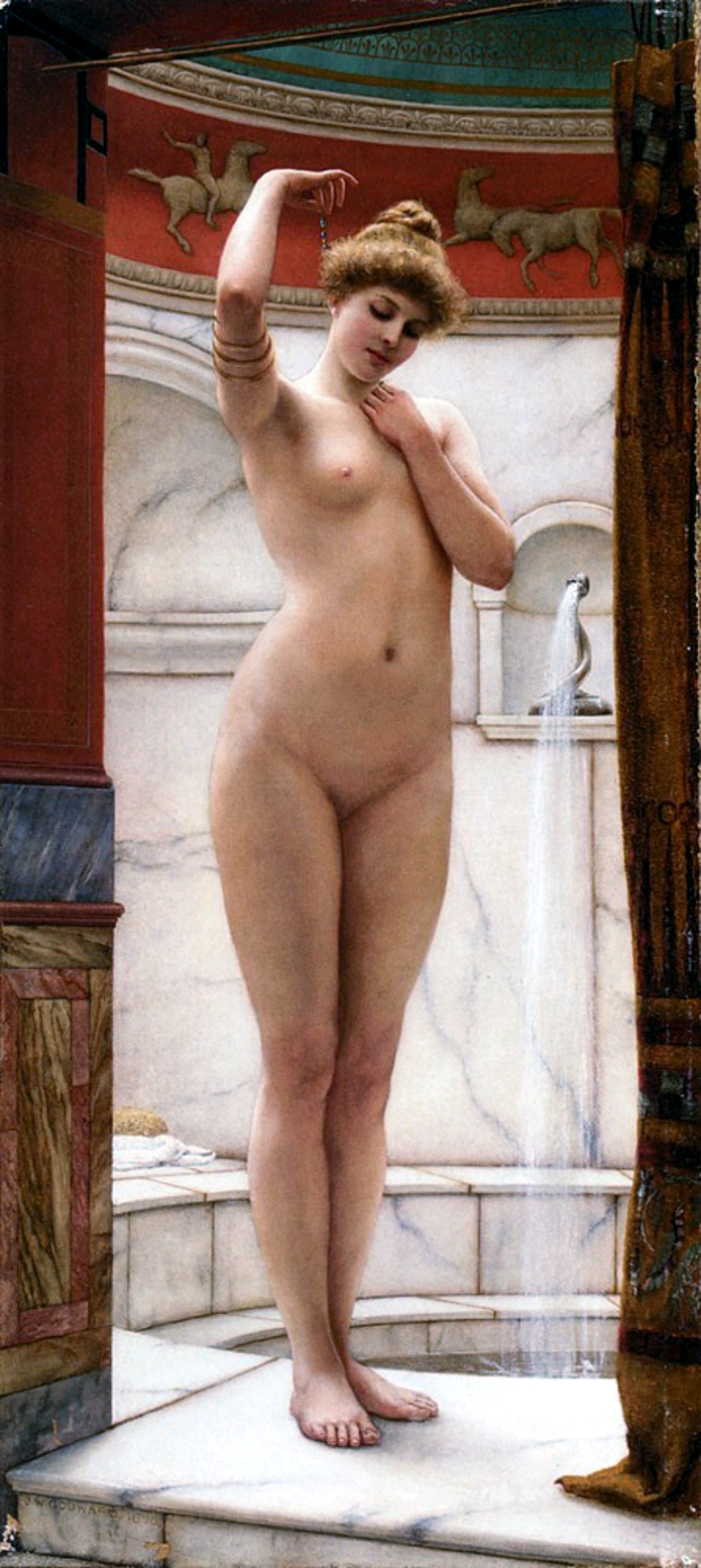
A Pompeian Bath, 1890

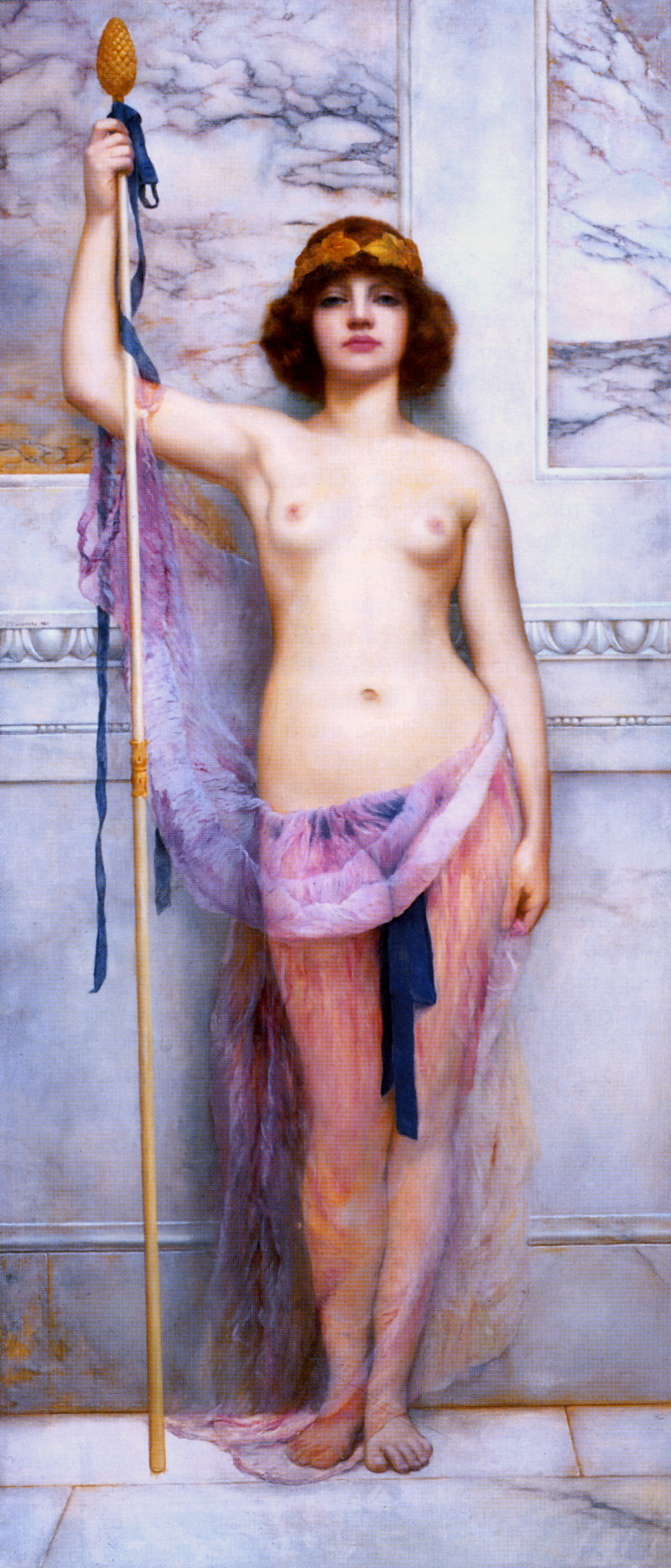
A Priestess 2 1893

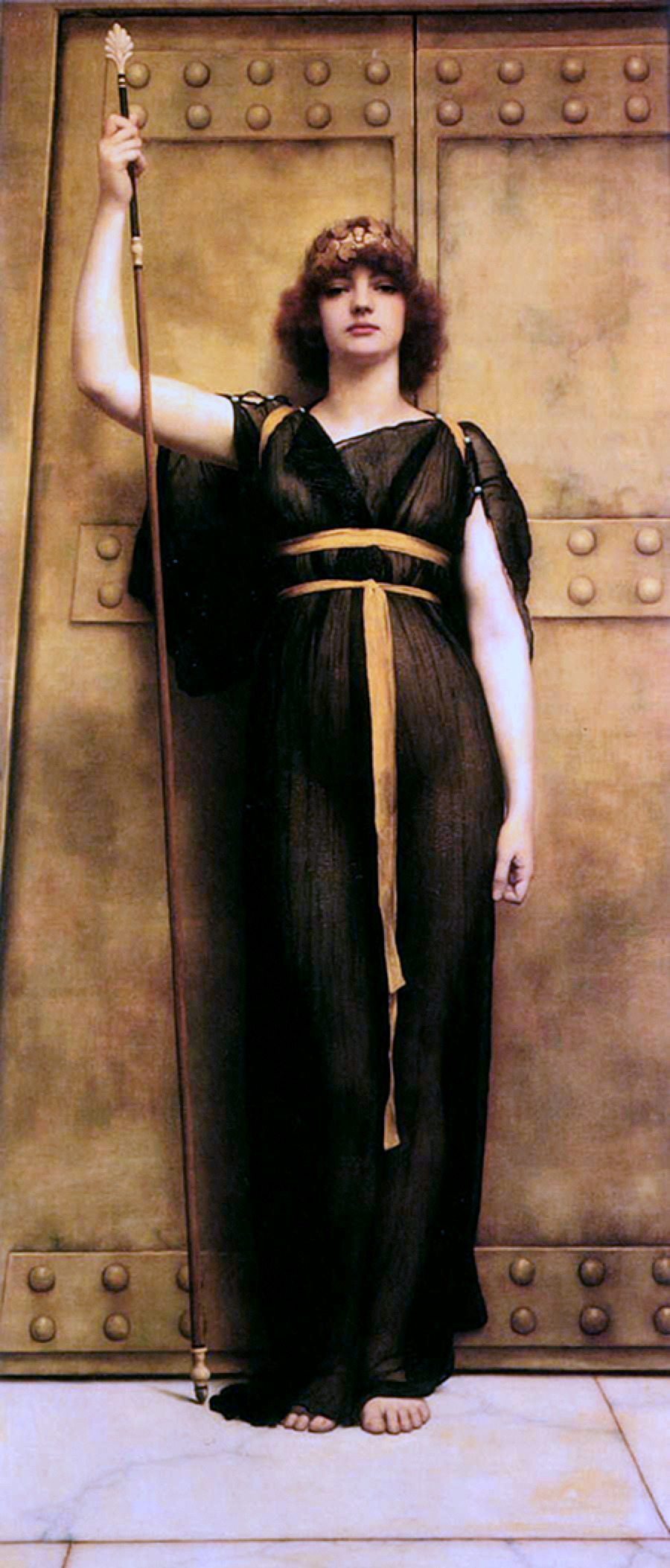
A Priestess, 1894

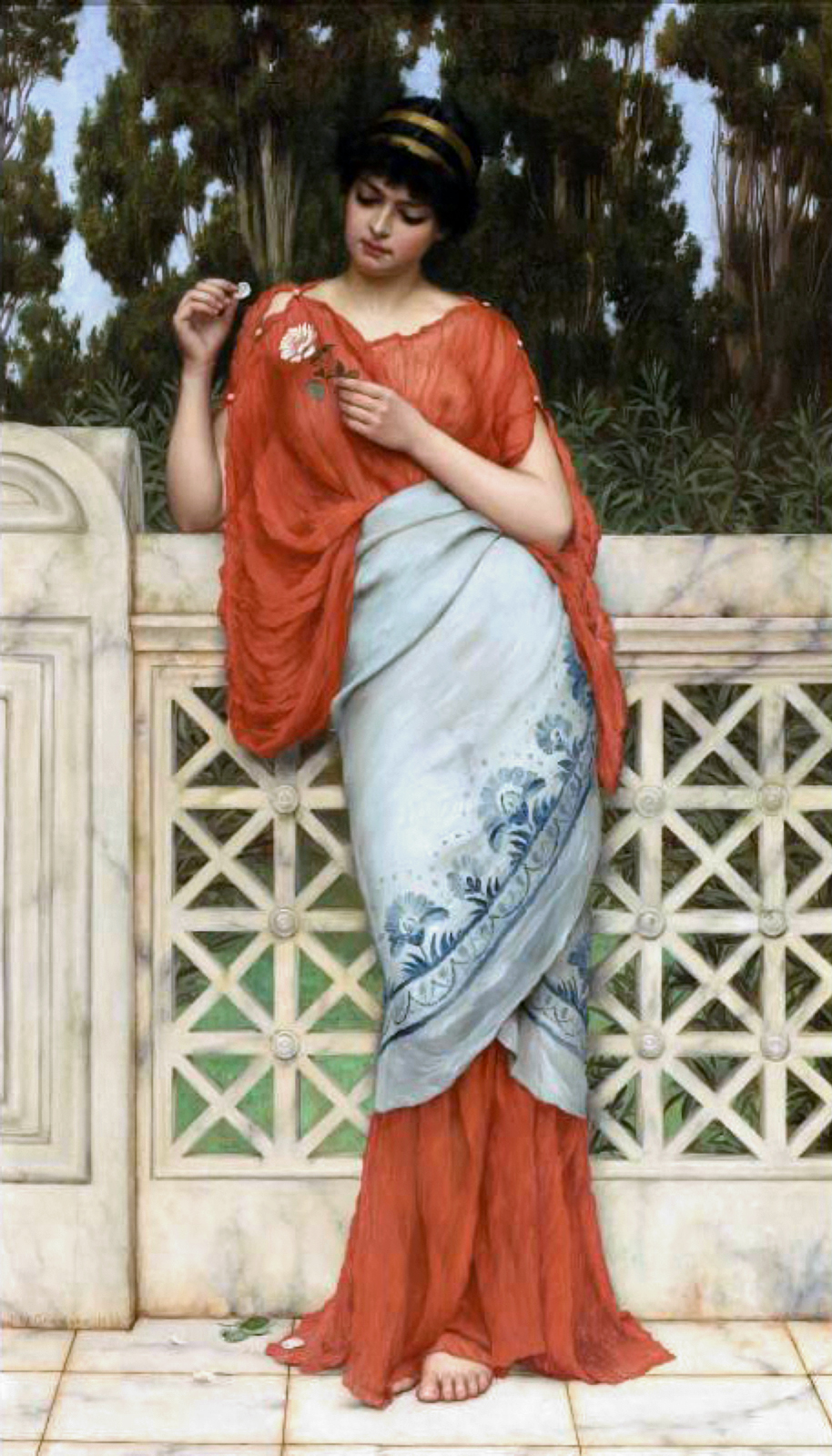
He Loves Me, He Loves Me Not, 1896

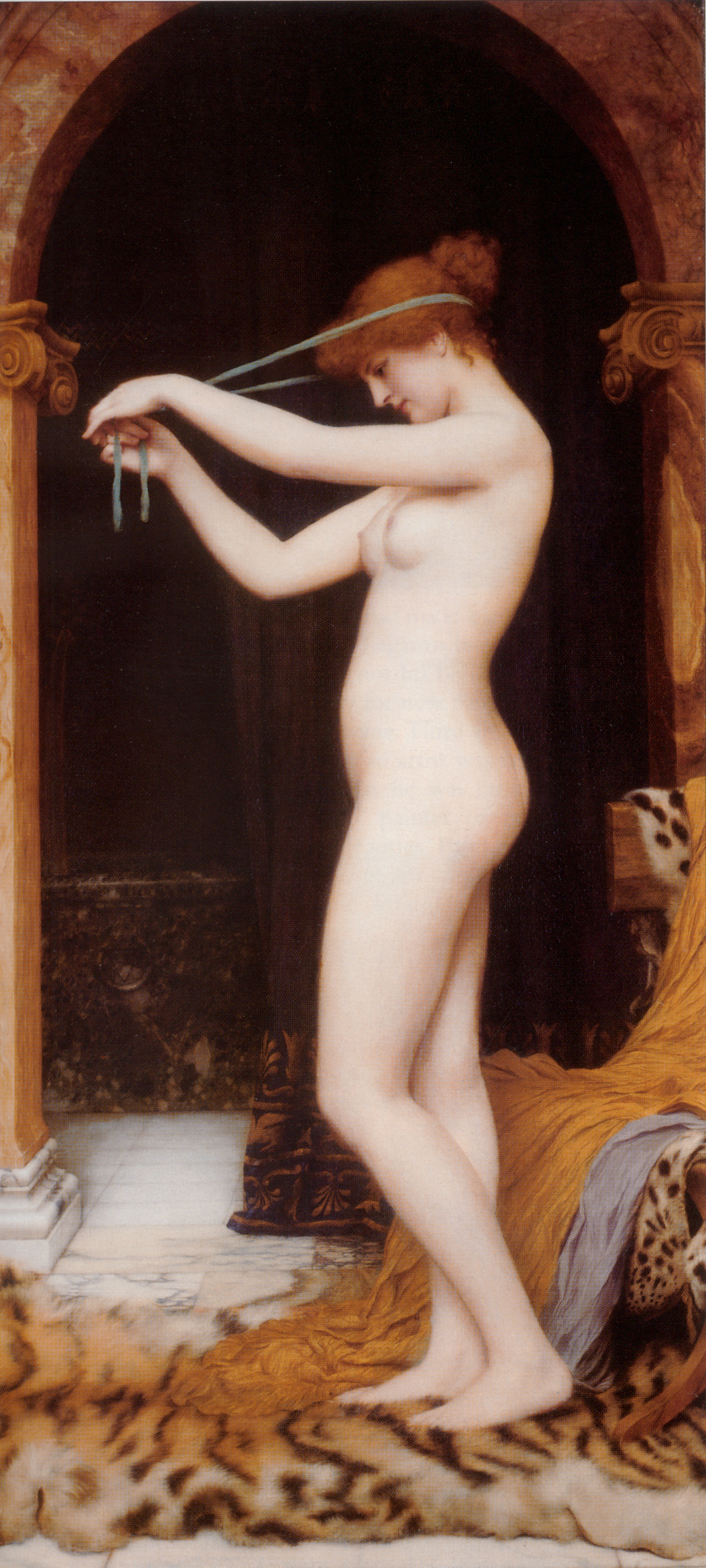
Venus Binding Her Hair, 1897

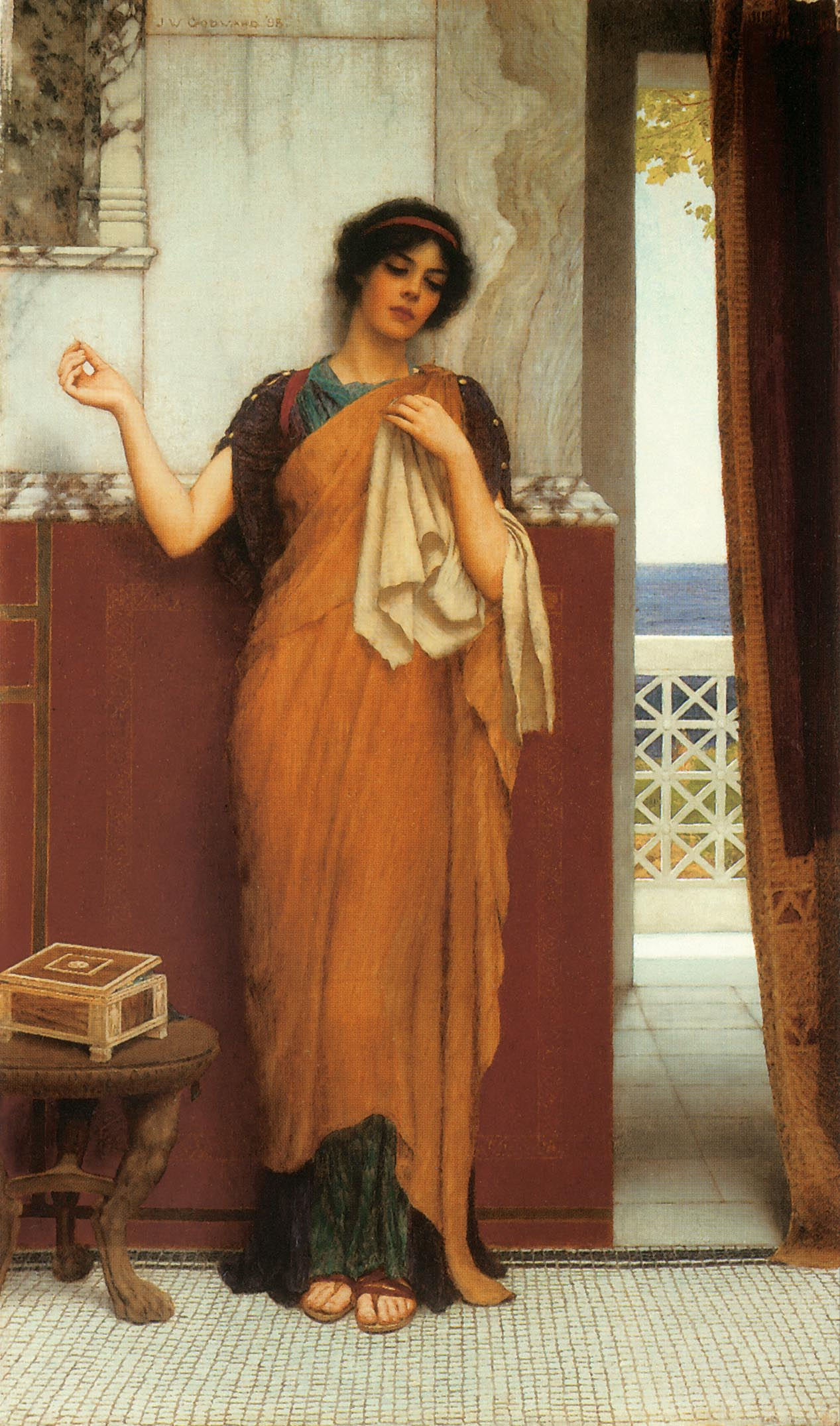
Idle Thoughts, 1898

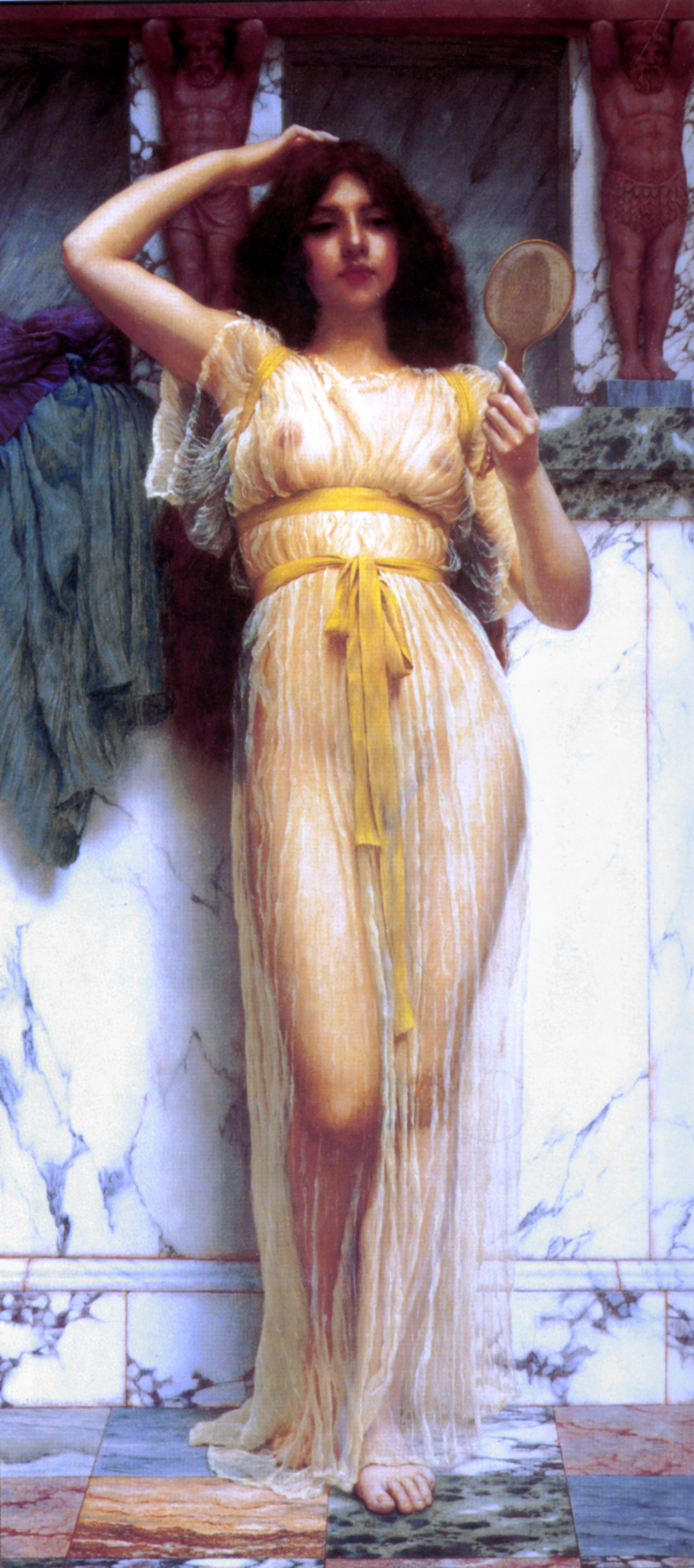
The Mirror, 1899

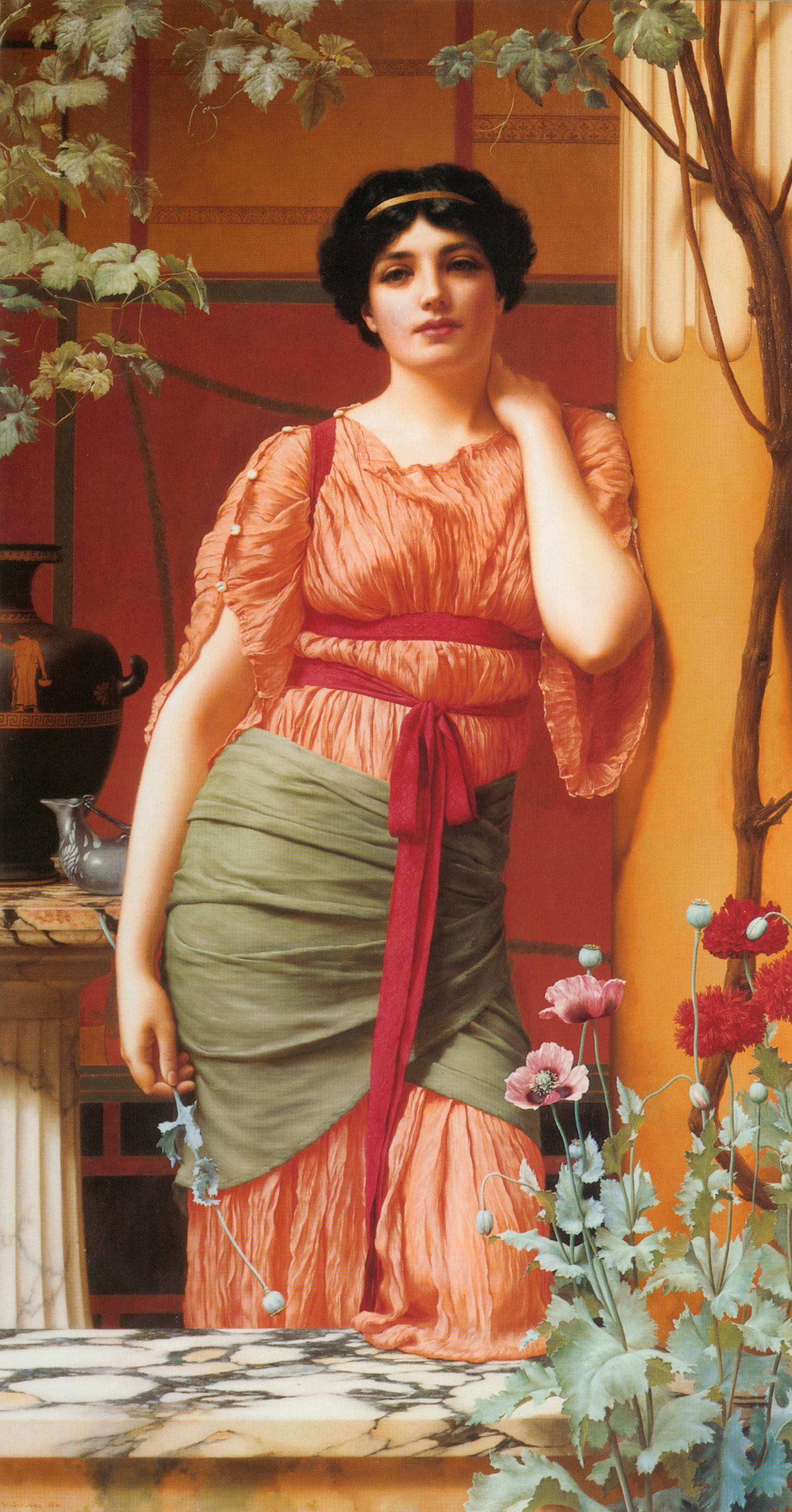
Nerissa (1906)

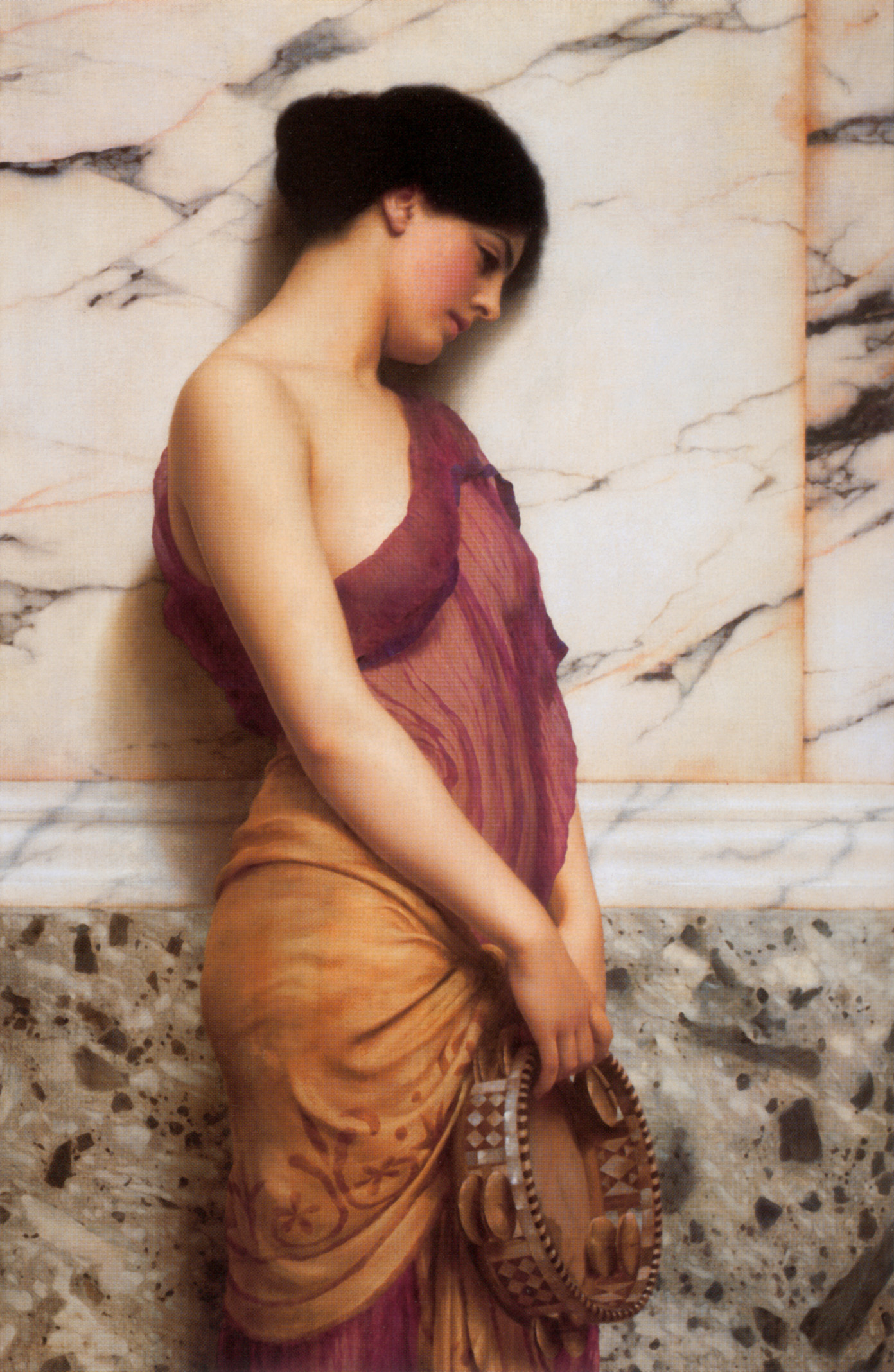
The Tambourine Girl, 1906

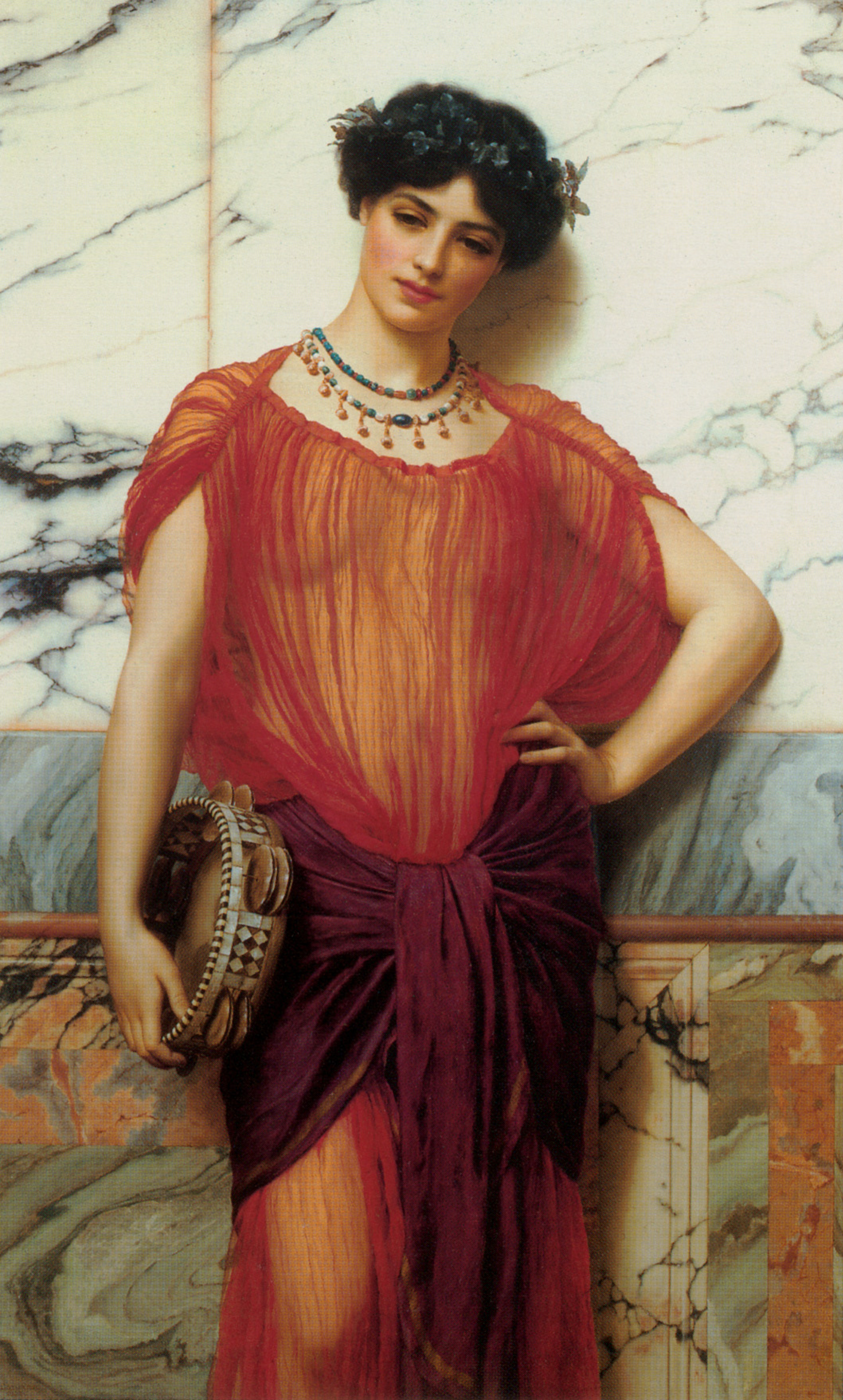
Drusilla, 1906

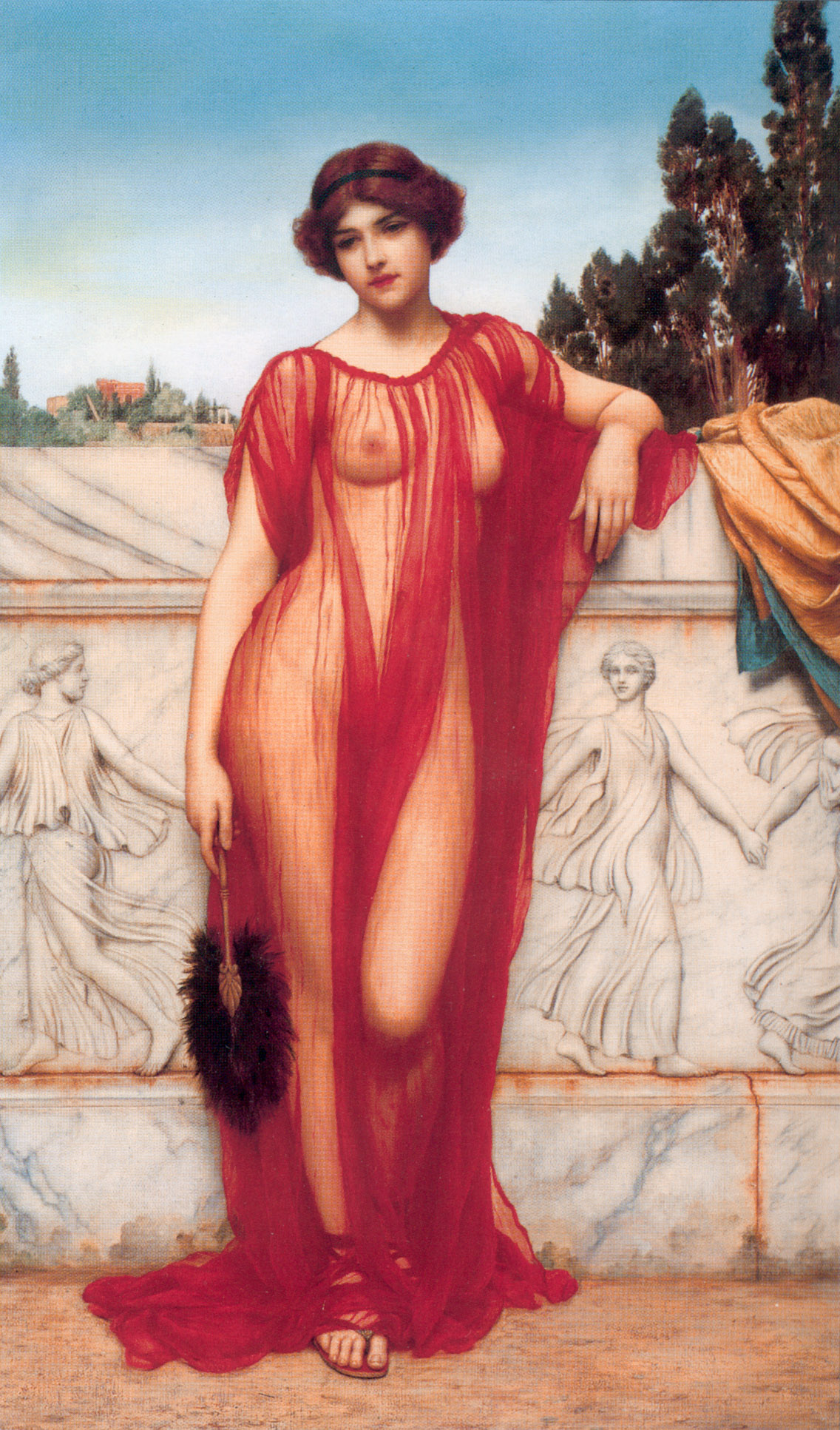
Athenais, 1908

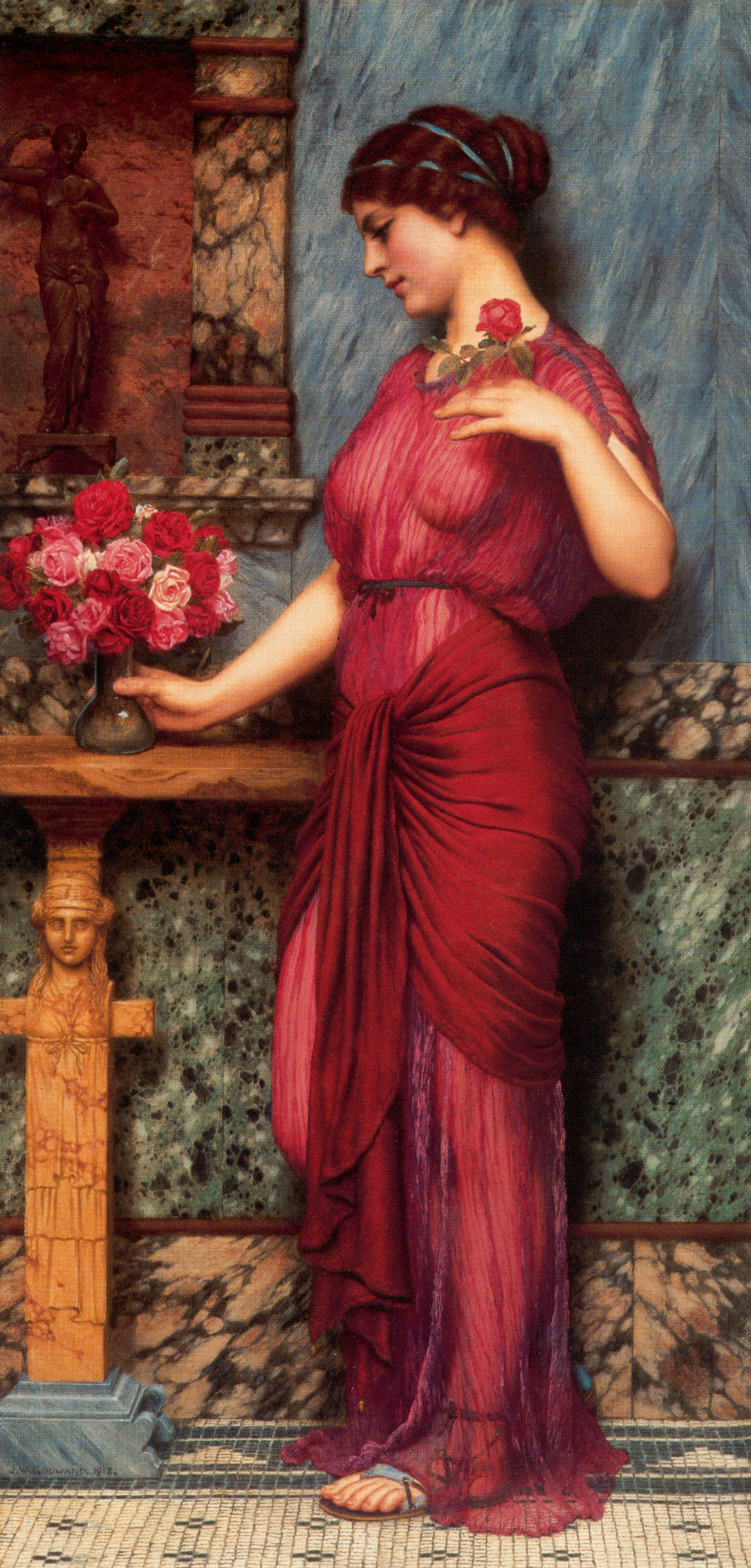
An Offering to Venus, 1912

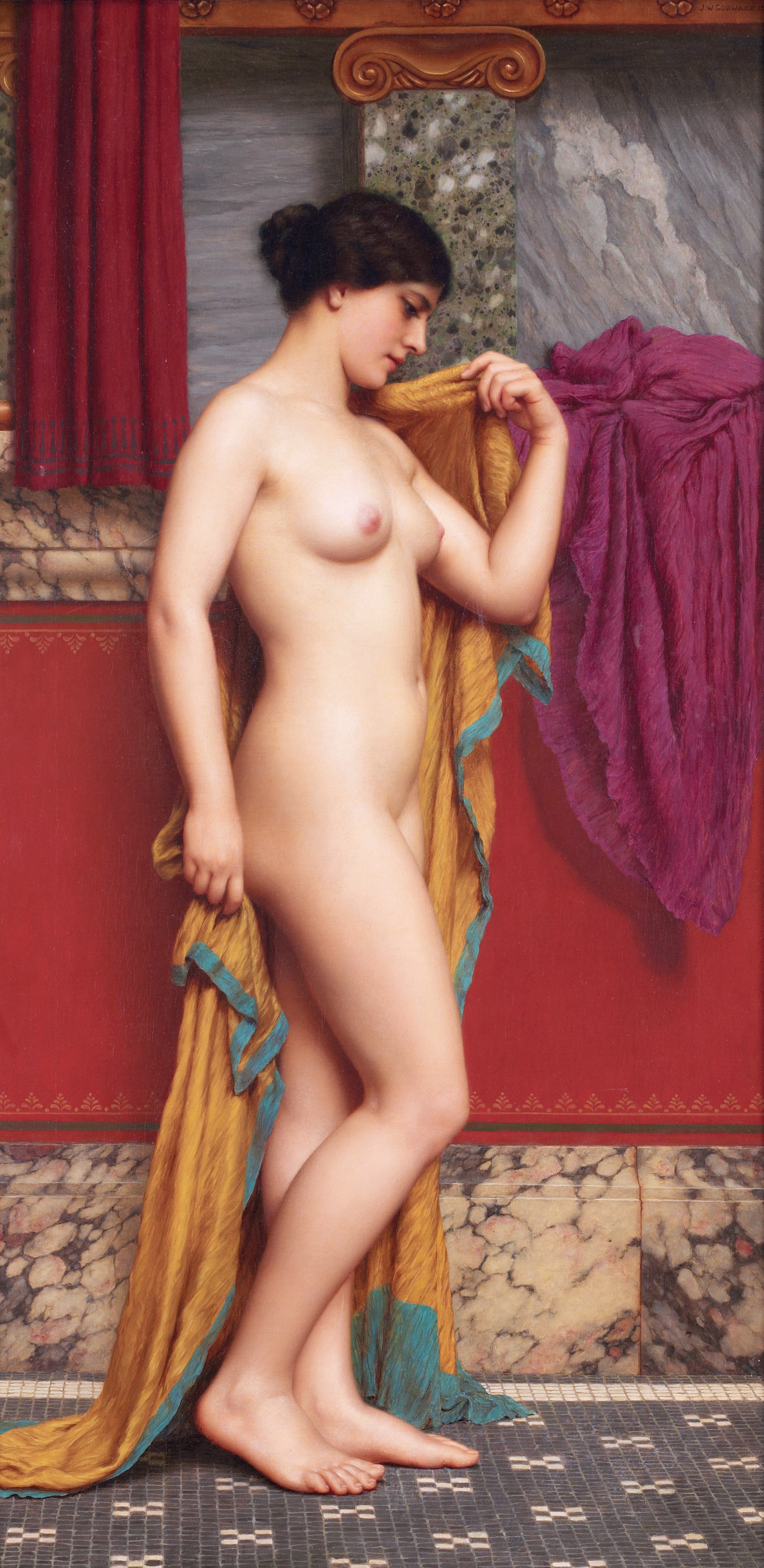
In the Tepidarium, 1913

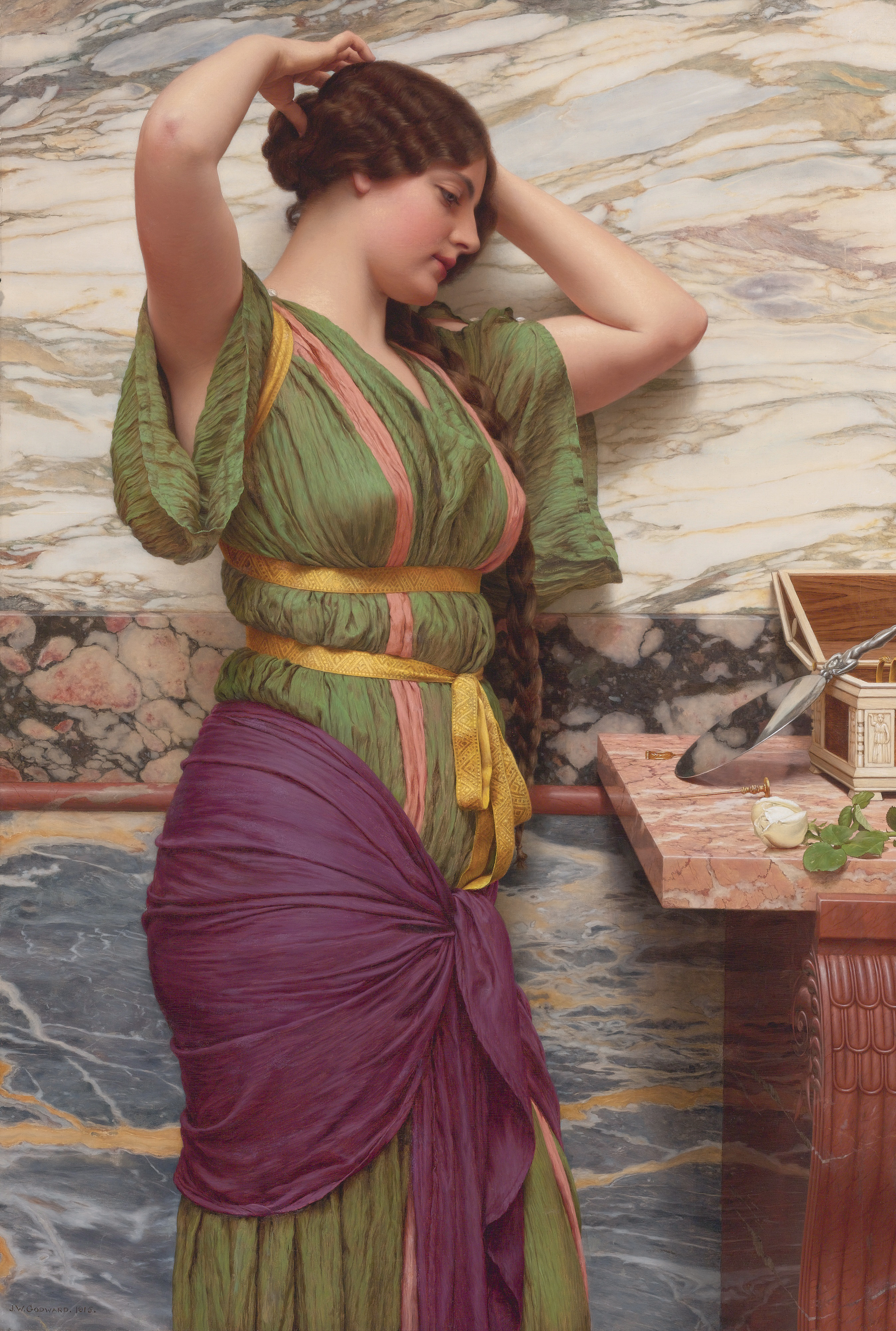
A fair reflection, 1915

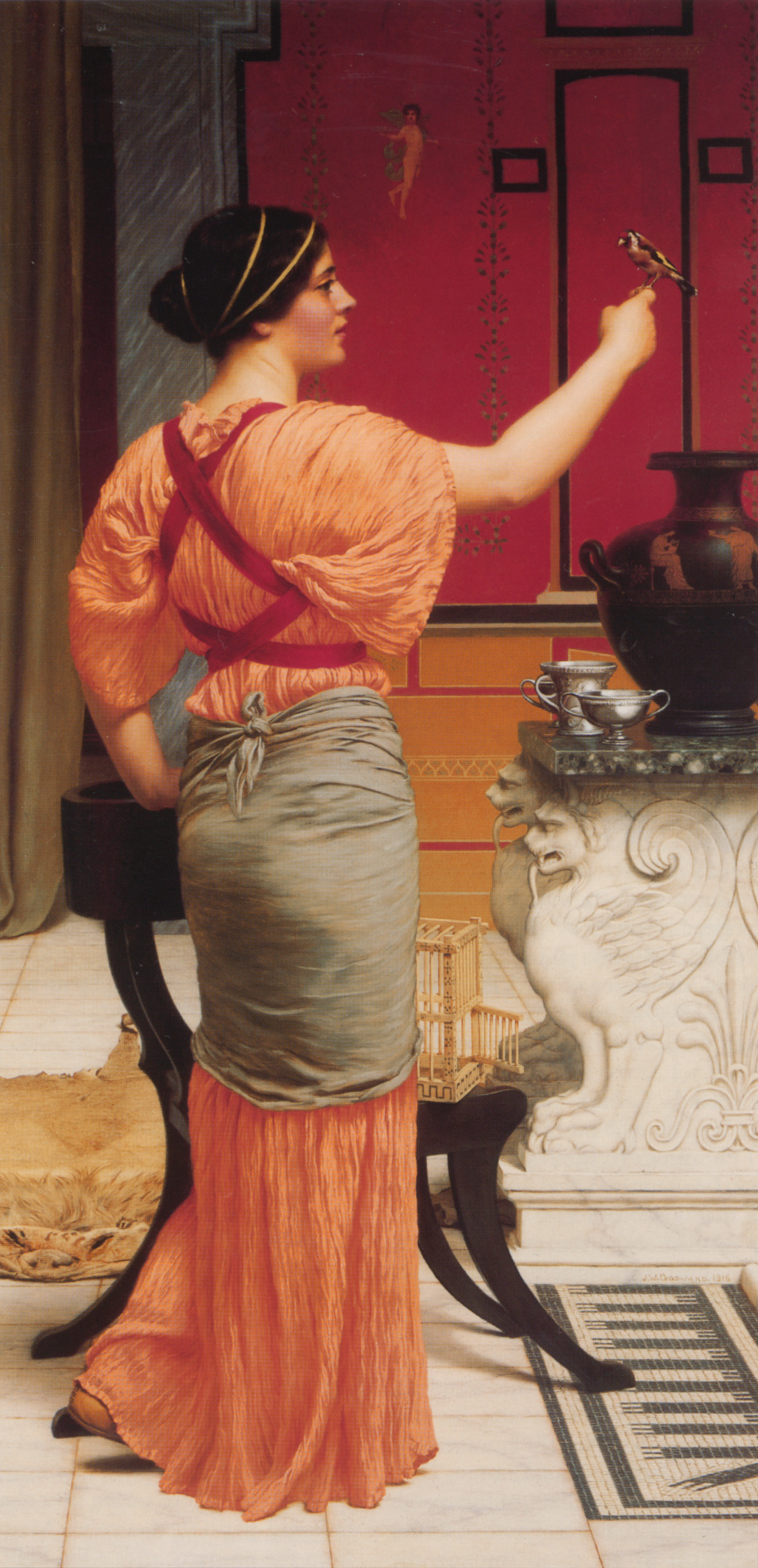
Lesbia with the Sparrow, 1916

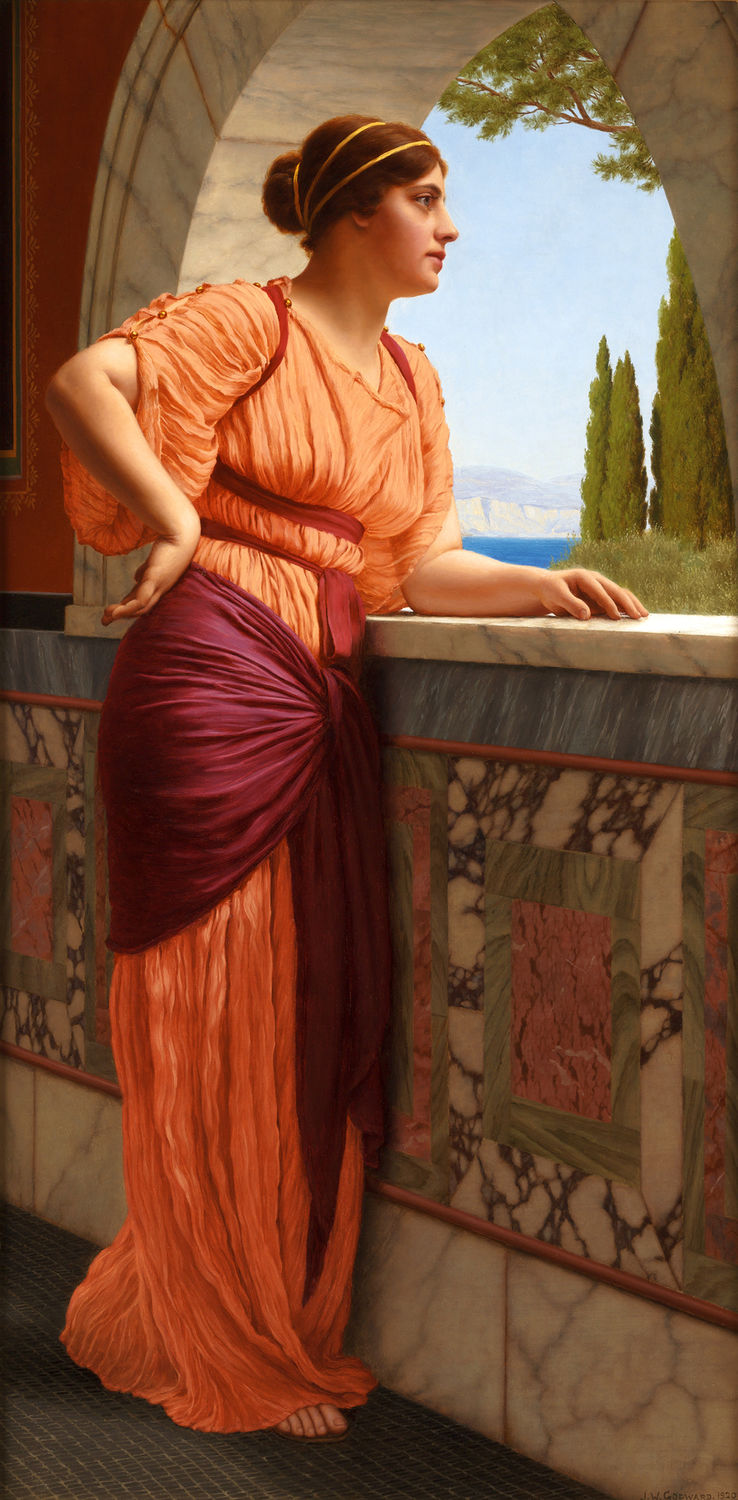
At the Window, 1920

== List of works by the artist ==
c. 1880–1881

- Portrait of Mary Perkington Godward

c. 1882–1883

- Portrait of Mary Frederica Godward

c. 1883

- Country House in the 18th Century

c. 1887

- Expectation
- Poppaea
- Portrait of Harriet (Hetty) Pettigrew in Classical Dress
- Portrait of Lillian (Lilly) Pettigrew in Classical Dress
- A Yellow Turban

c. 1887–1888

- Japonica
- A Roman Head

1888

- A Beauty in Profile
- An Eastern Beauty
- The Engagement Ring
- Flo
- Ianthe
- Lily
- Threissa
- The Tiff
- Waiting for the Dance

1889

- Callirhoe
- Grecian Reverie
- A Greek Girl
- Head of a Roman Woman
- Ianthe
- His Birthday Gift
- Waiting For An Answer

1890

- A Pompeian Bath
- A Priestess of Bacchus
- Athenais
- Flowers Of Venus

1891

- A Pompeian Lady
- Innocent Amusement
- The Sweet Siesta of a Summer Day

1892

- At The Garden Shrine, Pompeii
- Classical Beauty
- Far Away Thoughts (landscape format)
- Far Away Thoughts (portrait format)
- Leaning On The Balcony
- The Betrothed
- The Playground
- With Violets Wreathed And Robe Of Saffron Hue

1893

- A Priestess (nude)
- Reflections
- Yes Or No
- At the Fountain

1894

- A Priestess

1895

- Mischief and Repose
- The Muse Erato At Her Lyre
- Tigerskin (date uncertain)

1896

- Campaspe (nude)
- He Loves Me, He Loves Me Not
- Female Portrait

1897

- Dolce Far Niente (first version)
- Venus Binding Her Hair, by 1897 (nude)

1898

- At The Gate Of The Temple
- Eighty and Eighteen
- Idle thoughts
- On The Balcony (first version)
- The Ring

1899

- The Bouquet
- The Delphic Oracle
- The Mirror
- The Signal

1900

- Idleness
- The Jewel Casket
- The Toilet

1901

- At The Garden Door
- Chloris
- Girl In Yellow Drapery
- Idle Hours
- Sweet Dreams
- The Favourite
- The Seamstress
- Venus At The Bath (nude)
- Youth And Time

1902

- An Italian Girl's Head
- Ionian Dancing Girl
- When the Heart is Young

1903

- Amaryllis
- Summer Flowers
- The Old, Old Story
- The Rendezvous

1904

- The Melody (or A Melody)
- Dolce Far Niente (second version)
- In The Days Of Sappho

1905

- A Greek Beauty
- A Roman Matron
- Flabellifera
- Mischief

1906

- Dolce Far Niente (third version)
- Drusilla
- Nerissa
- The Tambourine Girl (first version - girl facing the viewer)
- The Tambourine Girl (second version - girl reclining against wall)

1907

- The Love Letter

1908

- A Classical Lady
- A Grecian Girl
- Ismenia

1909

- A Classical Beauty
- A Grecian Lovely (date uncertain)
- At The Thermae (semi nude)
- Tympanistria

1910

- A Cool Retreat
- Noon Day Rest
- Reverie (first version)
- Sappho

1911

- In Realms Of Fancy
- On The Balcony (second version)

1912

- A Tryst
- Absence Makes The Heart Grow Fonder
- An Offering To Venus
- By The Wayside
- Reverie (second version)
- Sabinella
- The Peacock Fan

1913

- Golden Hours
- In The Tepidarium (nude)
- La Pensierosa
- Le Billet Doux
- The Belvedere

1914

- The Necklace
- The New Perfume
- Tranquility

1915

- In The Prime Of The Summer Time

1916

- Ancient Pastimes
- By The Blue Ionian Sea
- Lesbia With Her Sparrow

1917

- A Lily Pond
- The Fruit Vendor
- Under The Blossom That Hangs On The Bough

1918

- A Fond farewell
- Sweet Sounds

1920

- A Red, Red Rose

1921

- Megilla

1922

- Contemplation
- Nu Sur La Plage (an exception to all other works, this is a 'modern' nude)

Date unknown

- Grape Vines
- Ophelia
- Time To Play

This list is not a complete list but serves to illustrate the extent of Godward's output.
