= Mischief and Repose =

Painting by John William Godward

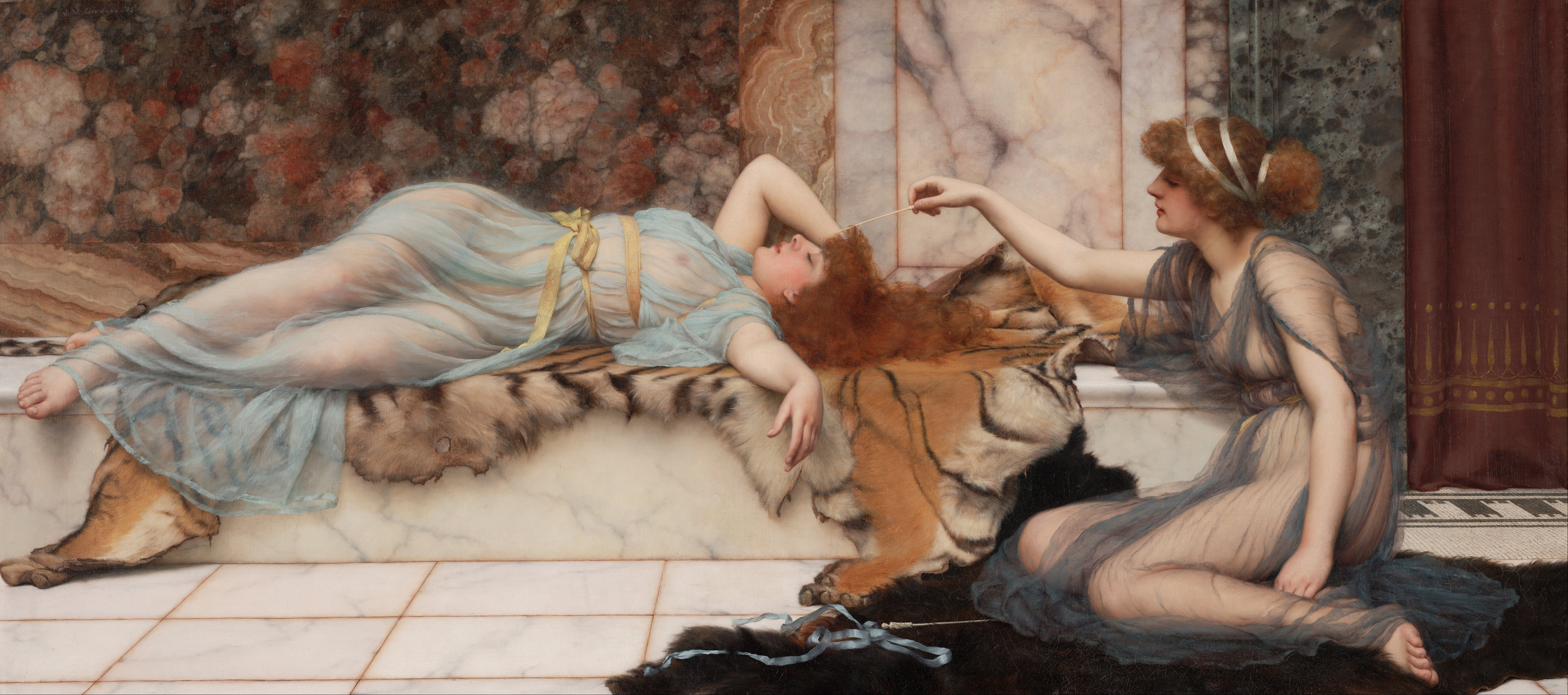
John William Godward, Mischief and Repose, 1895, J. Paul Getty Museum

Mischief and Repose is an 1895 oil-on-canvas painting by British artist John William Godward. It has been held by the J. Paul Getty Museum in Los Angeles since 1979. Godward painted a second, smaller painting, with a different composition but the same title, in 1909.

Godward's 1895 painting depicts an interior scene from Ancient Greece or Rome, following the Neoclassical tradition of Lawrence Alma-Tadema. It depicts two auburn-haired young women, both dressed in long flowing robes modelled on an ancient chiton, made of a sheer material, respectively blue and grey, and tied at the waist. For the two female subjects, Godward used his regular models, Hetty Pettigrew and Lily Pettigrew. It is signed and dated on the multicoloured marble wall in the upper left corner, "J. W. GODWARD '95". The landscape composition measures 60.6 cm × 133 cm (23.9 in × 52.4 in).

The first woman to the left ("Repose") is lying on a tiger skin spread over a marble bench, with her right hand lifted behind her head and her left arm sprawling outward. To the right, a second woman ("Mischief") is kneeling on a black animal skin on the floor, attempting to disturb the other's slumbers: Mischief is reaching out her hand, holding a long white dress pin over the forehead of Repose. A second dress pin lies on the floor, beside a discarded hair ribbon. To the left, the floor has large white marble tiles, and to the right, small tesserae of a white mosaic with a black patterned border. The bench is a white marble with light grey veins, and the wall behind is clad with panels of several richly coloured and patterned marbles. A purple curtain with a gold border hangs to the right. Neither of the women engages with the viewer, and the cold academic style of the painting and their pale skin makes each as a petrified statue, like the rest of the marble room.

The painting was bought from the artist by the art dealer Léon Henri Lefèvre in 1895. It was sold at Christie's in 1924 by Sir Henry Grayson, and passed through the hands of several deals and collectors, including Nathan Mitchell and H. Aron. It was sold by J. Woolf at Christie's in 1938 and acquired by J. Paul Getty; after his death in 1976, his estate passed the work to the J. Paul Getty Museum in Los Angeles in 1979.

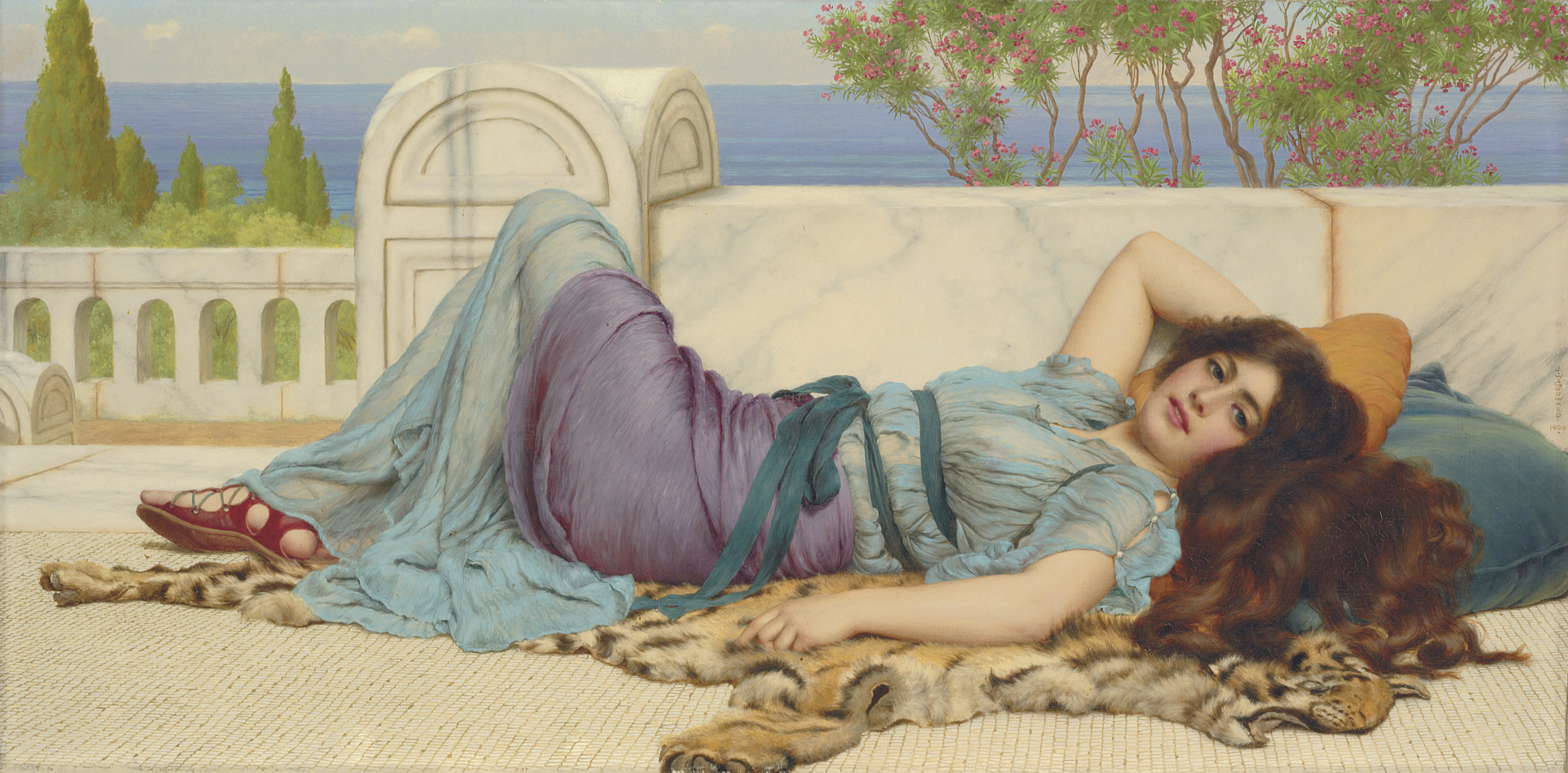
John William Godward, Mischief and Repose, 1909

Godward completed a second painting with the same title in 1909, about half the size at 38.4 cm × 76.9 cm (15.1 in × 30.3 in) and with a somewhat different composition, in which a single woman reclines outdoors on a tiger skin, glancing mischievously at the viewer. This later version was sold at Christie's in 2008 for £181,250.
