= Indian honorifics =

Courtesy form of address in the Indian subcontinent

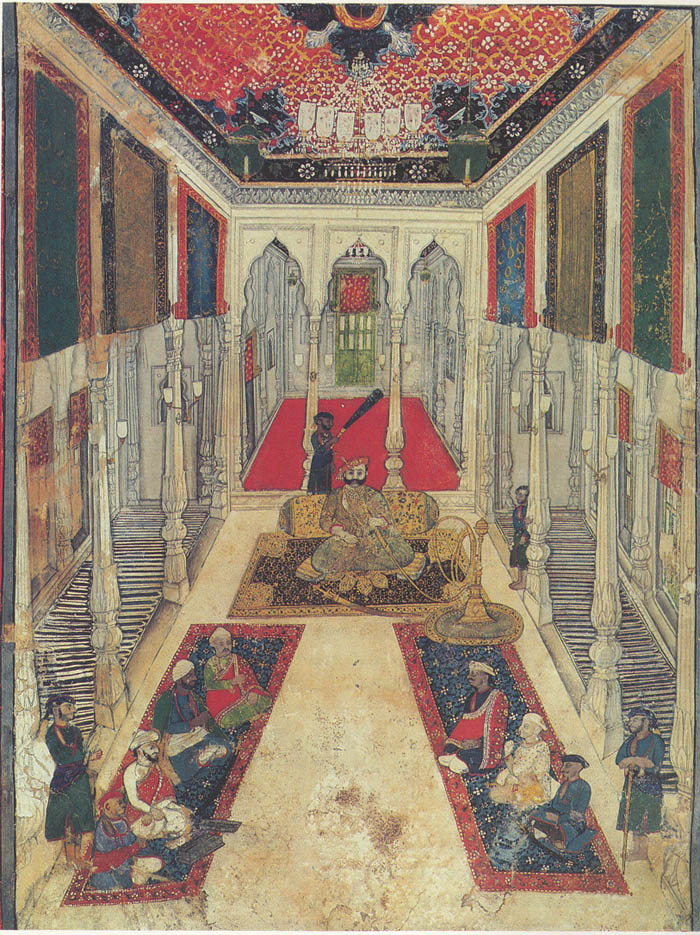
A Maratha Durbar showing the Chief (Raja) and the nobles (Sardars, Jagirdars, Sarpatil, Istamuradars & Mankaris) of the state.

Indian honorifics are honorific titles or appendices to names used in the Indian subcontinent, covering formal and informal social, commercial, and religious relationships. These may take the form of prefixes, suffixes or replacements.

== Native honorifics ==
Honorifics with indigenous Indian origin.

=== Indigenous honorifics ===
==== List of titles ====
- Abhyasi
- Acharya
- Aasaan
- Appa - title given to Lingayat and Maratha Kings meaning "head" or "father".
- Ayya
- Baba
- Babu
- Bhagavan
- Bhagat
- Bhonsle
- Bhai
- Chhatrapati
- Chakravarti, Chakraborty
- Chettiar, suffix denoting a man's wealth
- Chitnis one of the most important and highest-ranking ministers in a court.
- Chauradia
- Choudhury
- Chempakaraman
- Das, a common surname on the Indian subcontinent which has also been applied as a title, signifying "devotee" or "votary" (in the context of religion); also, Dasa
- Devi
- Deshmukh, Maratha title given to "Head of State".
- Dvija
- Gain or Gayen
- Goaysain
- Guru
- Hati
- Jagadguru
- Jagirdar
- Jena
- Kothari
- Kshatriya Kulavantas, Maratha title given to "Kshatriya Family".
- Kumari
- Kunwar, Kumar
- Mahacharya — an honorific spiritual title meaning "great teacher", used in Hinduism, Buddhism, and Jainism.
- Mahamandaleshwar
- Mahant
- Maharaj, Maharaja, Maharajadhiraj
- Mahātmā
- Maharani
- Maharishi, Maharshi
- Mahayogi, Mahayogini
- Mankari
- Mantrik
- Melshanthi
- Menon
- Muni
- Naidu
- Naicker
- Nayak
- Pandit
- Patil, Maratha title given to "Head of Village" & "Kshatriya Noble Family".
- Patlin, Maratha Title given to "Wife of Patil Saheb & Kshatrani".
- Paramahamsa
- Paramguru
- Potdar
- Prabhu
- Pujari
- Raj
- Raje, Raidu, Raja, Rai/Ray, Rana, Rao, Rawal, Rawat
- Rajarshi
- Rajguru
- Rajkumar, Maharajkumar
- Rajkumari, Maharajkumari
- Rani
- Reddy
- Rishi
- Rao
- Rishi Mudgal
- Rout
- Sādhaka
- Sadhu
- Sahu/Sahoo
- Sain, Saeen
- Samanta
- Samrat
- Sannyasin
- Sardar
- Sarpatil
- Satguru, Sadguru
- Sawai
- Singh
- Sethi, Sheth, suffixes denoting a man's wealth
- Shankaracharya
- Shaunaka
- Shishya
- Sri Shri, Shree
- Shrimati, Maratha title given to "Rich or Noble Person".
- Swami
- Thakur
- Thiru or Thirumathi
- Yogi, Yogini
- Yuvraj
- Veer

==== Secular profession-specific honorifics ====
- Lambardar
- Patwari
- Pandit (Can have Hindu connotations)
- Zamindar
- Ghatwal
- Mulraiyat
- Pradhan
- Jagirdar
- Mustajir
- Zaildar
- Talukdar
- Thikadars

==== Influence on other cultures ====
Hinduism expansion in Asia, from its heartland in Indian subcontinent, to the rest of Asia, especially Southeast Asia, started circa 1st century marked with the establishment of early Hindu settlements and polities in Southeast Asia.

With the expansion of Indosphere cultural influence of Greater India, Indian cultural influence spread through the transmission of Hinduism in Southeast Asia and the Silk Road transmission of Buddhism. These processes contributed to the Indianization of Southeast Asia. Non-Indian Southeast Asian Indianised kingdoms adopted Sanskritization in their languages and titles. The expansion of the Indian diaspora was associated with the use of Indianised names in places outside India, including names of people, places, institutions, and educational institutes, as well as influences on architecture, martial arts, music and dance, clothing, and cuisine.

Examples of Indian-influenced honorifics include:

- Burmese honorifics and Burmese Buddhist titles
- Cambodia honorifics
- Cham honorifics
- Filipino styles and honorifics
- Indonesian honorifics
- Khmer honorifics
- Lao honorifics
- Malay styles and titles
- Sinhala honorifics
- Thai royal ranks and titles
- Tamil honorifics

=== Indo-Islamic honorifics ===
- Amir
- Badshah
- Bahadur
- Beg
- Begum
- Darogha
- Dastur / Dastoor
- Ghazi
- Hazrat
- Khan or Khatoon for females
- Khaqan
- Mahaldar
- Mansabdar
- Mir
- Mirza
- Sahib
- Shah and Shahanshah
- Shahzada
- Sultan
- Syed
- Taluqdar
- Ustad

=== Maratha honorifics ===
Associated with the Maratha Kingdom or general Marathi-speaking population.

- Kshatriyakulavatans
- Chhatrapati
- Maharaj
- Maharani
- Peshwa
- PratapRao
- Appa
- Sardar
- Deshmukh
- Patil
- Rao

=== Sikh honorific ===
- Sardar
- Sardarni
- Giani

=== Nepali (Gorkhali) honorifics ===
Associated with the Khas Kings of Nepal, esp. the Shah dynasty of the Kingdom of Gorkha.

- Kaji
- Mukthiyar
- Jangi Lat
- Khazanchi
- Maharajdhiraj
- Maharathi
- Nayab
- Rajpratinidhi

== See also ==
- Honorary titles of Indian leaders
- Currently official honors:
  - Indian honours system
  - Awards and decorations of the Indian Armed Forces
  - Battle and theatre honours of the Indian Army
  - India Style (manner of address)
- Past or unofficial honors:
  - English honorifics
  - Order of British India
