= Clothing in India =

Variety of ethnic and cultural clothing worn by the people of India

Clothing in India varies with the different ethnicities, geography, climate, and cultural traditions of the people of each region of India. Historically, clothing has evolved from simple garments like kaupina, langota, achkan, lungi, sari, to perform rituals and dances. In urban areas, western clothing is common and uniformly worn by people of all social levels. India also has a great diversity in terms of weaves, fibers, colors, and the material of clothing. Sometimes, color codes are followed in clothing based on the religion and ritual concerned. The clothing in India also encompasses a wide variety of Indian embroidery, prints, handicrafts, embellishments, and styles of wearing clothes. A wide mix of Indian traditional clothing and Western styles can be seen in India.

== History ==
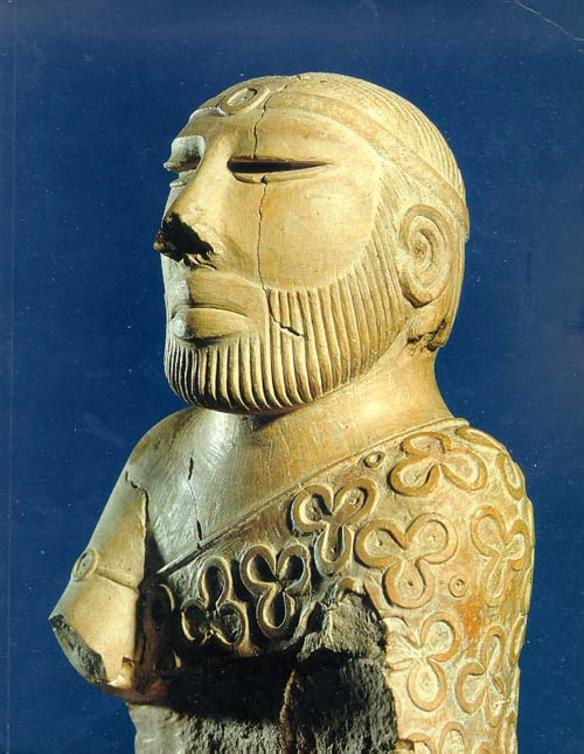
Statue of "Priest King" wearing a robe, Indus Valley Civilisation

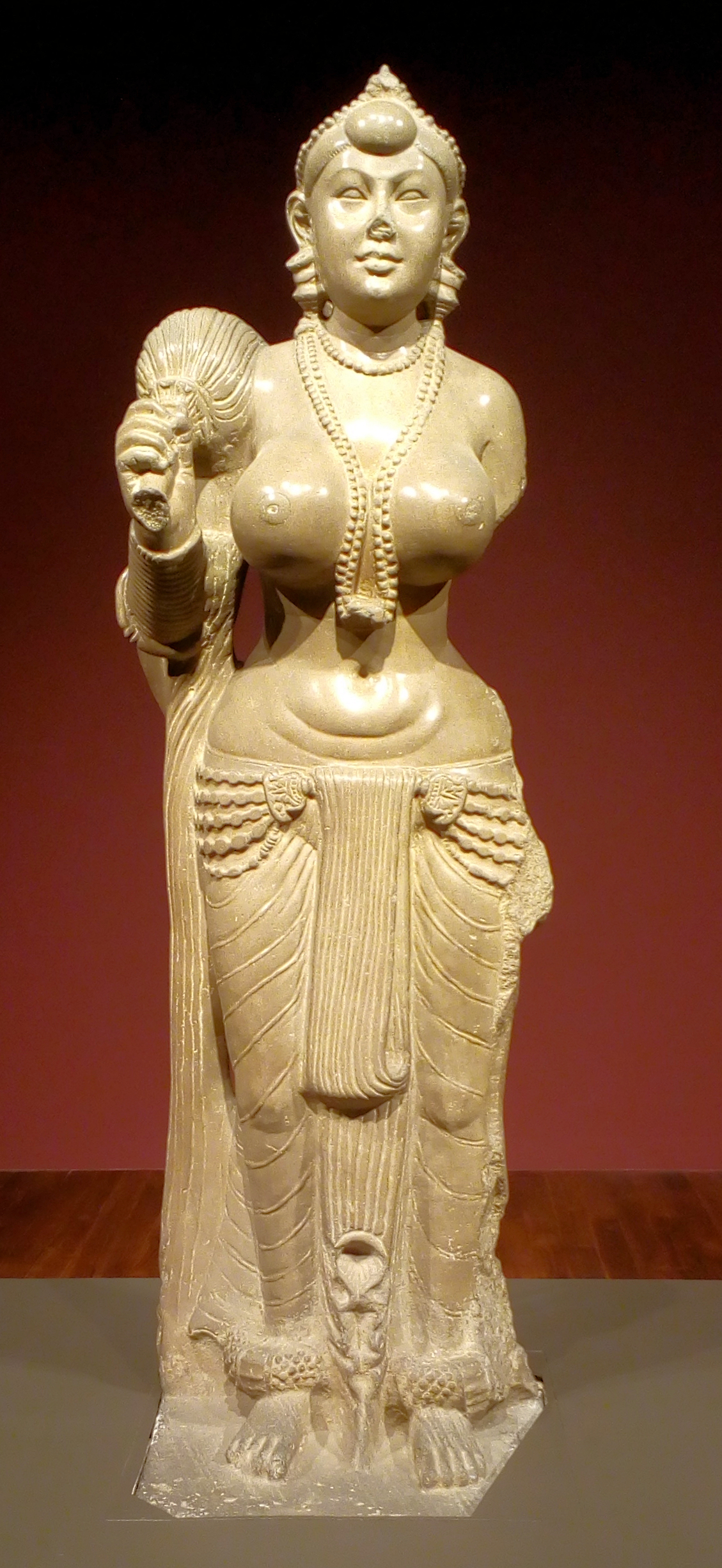
The Didarganj Yakshi depicting the dhoti wrap, c. 300 BC.

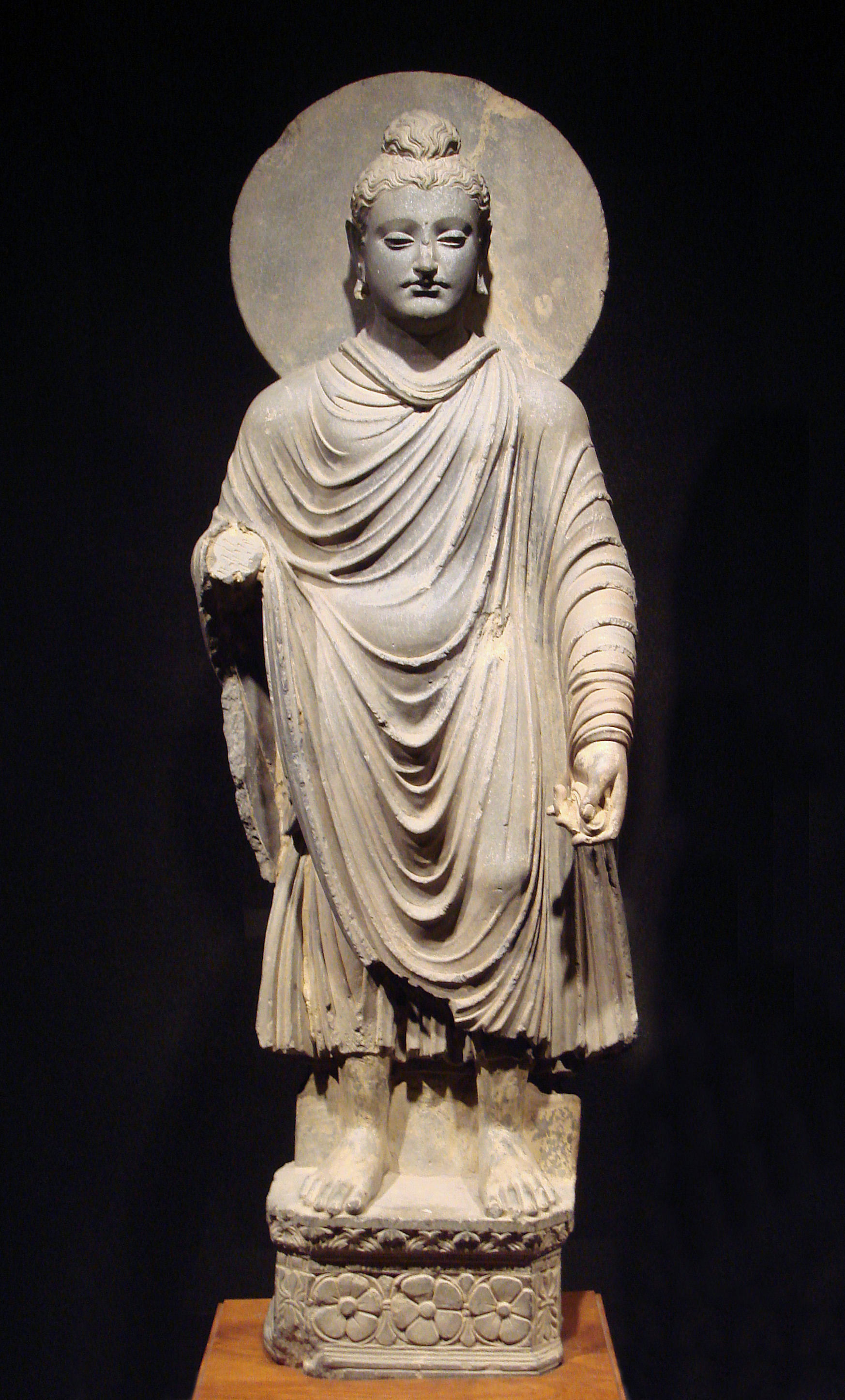
The Buddha wearing kāṣāya robes, c. 200 BC.

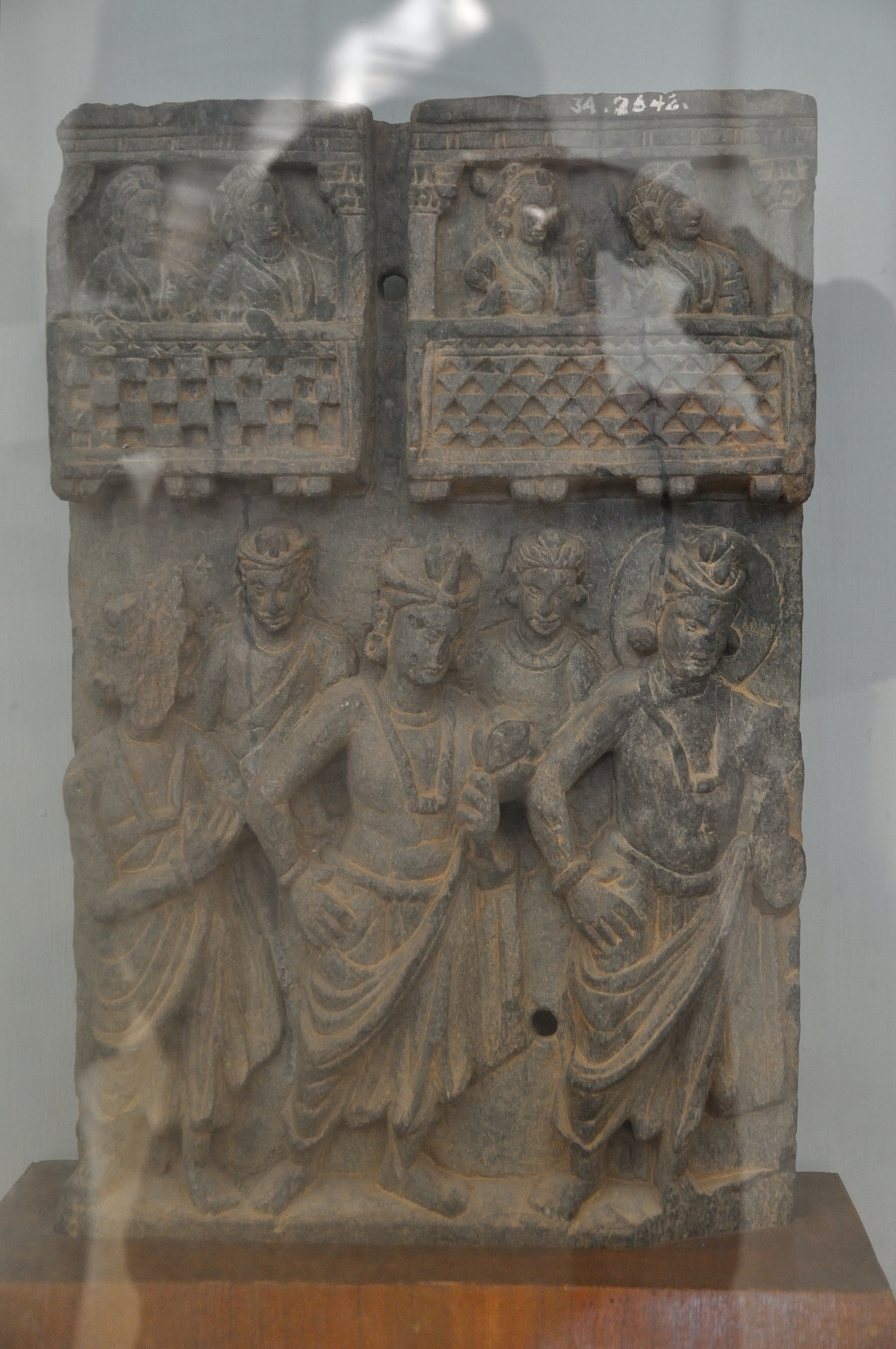
Relief depicting men in antriya and uttariya, first century AD.

India's recorded history of clothing goes back to the fifth millennium BC in the Indus Valley Civilisation, where cotton was spun, woven and dyed. Bone needles and wooden spindles have been unearthed in excavations at the site. The cotton industry in ancient India was well developed, and several of the methods survive until today. Herodotus, an ancient Greek historian described Indian cotton as "a wool exceeding in beauty and goodness that of sheep". Indian cotton clothing was well adapted to the dry, hot summers of the subcontinent. The grand epic Mahabharata, composed in about 400 BC, tells of the god Krishna staving off Draupadi's disrobing by bestowing an unending cheera upon her. Most of the present knowledge of ancient Indian clothing comes from rock sculptures and paintings in cave monuments such as Ellora. These images show dancers and goddesses wearing what appears to be a dhoti wrap, a predecessor to the modern sari. The upper castes dressed in fine muslin and wore gold ornaments The Indus Civilisation also knew the process of silk production. An analysis of Harappan silk fibres in beads has shown that silk was made by the process of reeling, a process allegedly known only to China until the early centuries AD. Kimkhwab is an Indian brocade woven of silk and gold or silver thread. The word kimkhwāb, derived from the Persian, means "a little dream", Kimkhwāb, known in India from ancient times, was called hiraṇya, or cloth of gold, in Vedic literature (c. 1500 BC). In the Gupta period (4th–6th century AD), it was known as puṣpapaṭa a, or cloth with woven flowers. During the Mughal period (1526–1857), when kimkhwāb was extremely popular with the rich, the great centres of brocade weaving were Benares (Vārānasi), Ahmādābād, Surat, and Aurangābād. Benares is now the most important centre of kimkhwāb production. When Alexander invaded Gandhara in 327 BC, block-printed textiles from India were noticed.

According to the Greek historian Arrian:

"The Indians use linen clothing, as says Nearchus, made from the flax taken from the trees, about which I have already spoken. And this flax is either whiter in colour than any other flax, or the people being black make the flax appear whiter. They have a linen frock reaching down halfway between the knee and the ankle, and a garment which is partly thrown round the shoulders and partly rolled round the head. The Indians who are very well-off wear earrings of ivory; for they do not all wear them. Nearchus says that the Indians dye their beards various colours; some that they may appear white as the whitest, others dark blue; others have them red, others purple, and others green. Those who are of any rank have umbrellas held over them in the summer. They wear shoes of white leather, elaborately worked, and the soles of their shoes are many-coloured and raised high, so that they may appear taller."

Evidence from the first century AD shows the Buddhas were portrayed as wearing saṃghāti that forms a part of the Kasaya of Buddhist monks. During the Maurya and Gupta period, the people wore both stitched and non-stitched clothing. The main items of clothing were the Antariya made of white cotton or muslin, tied to the waist by a sash called Kayabandh, and a scarf called the Uttariya used to drape the top half of the body.

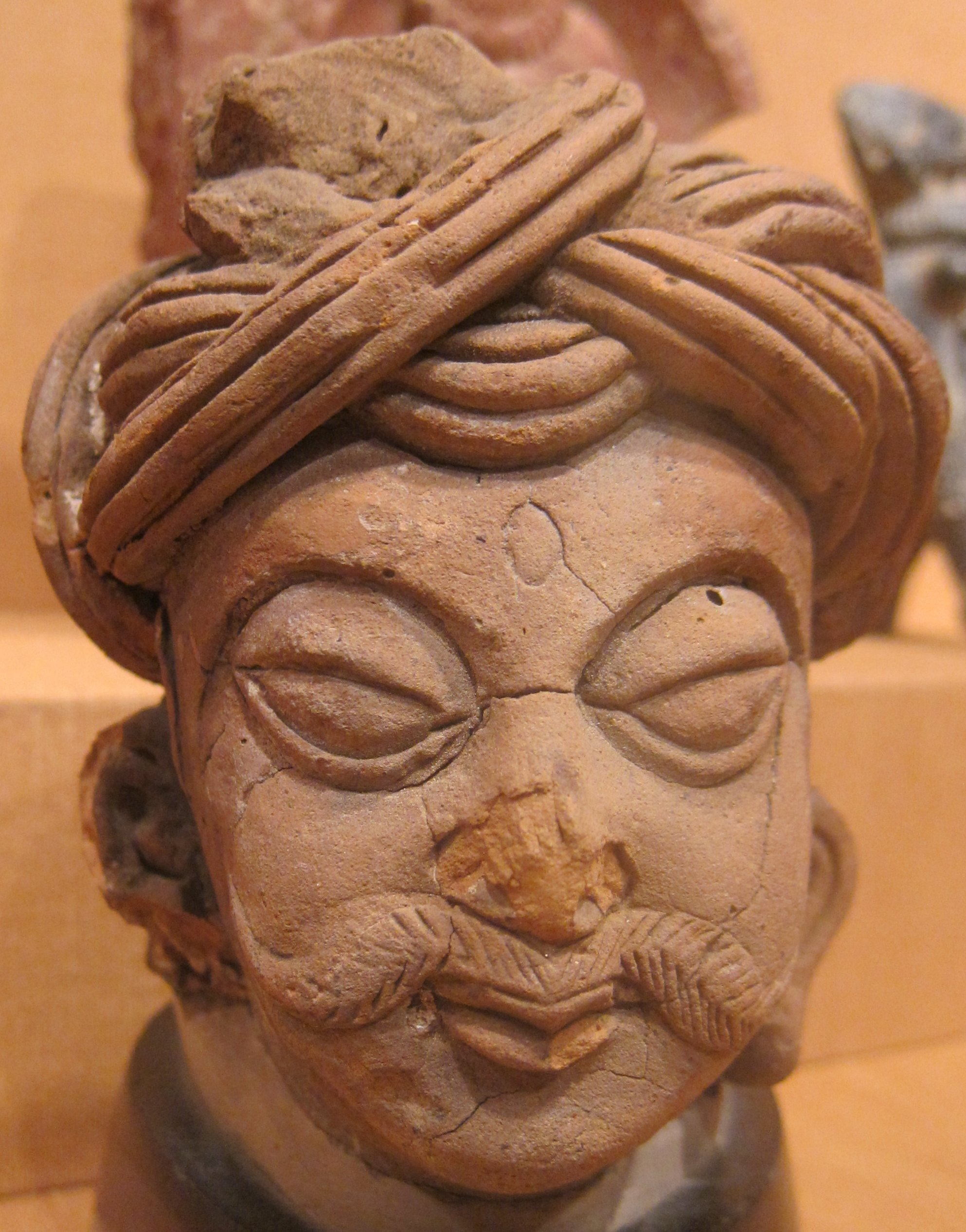
Terracotta head, wearing possibly an early form of pagri from the Gupta period.

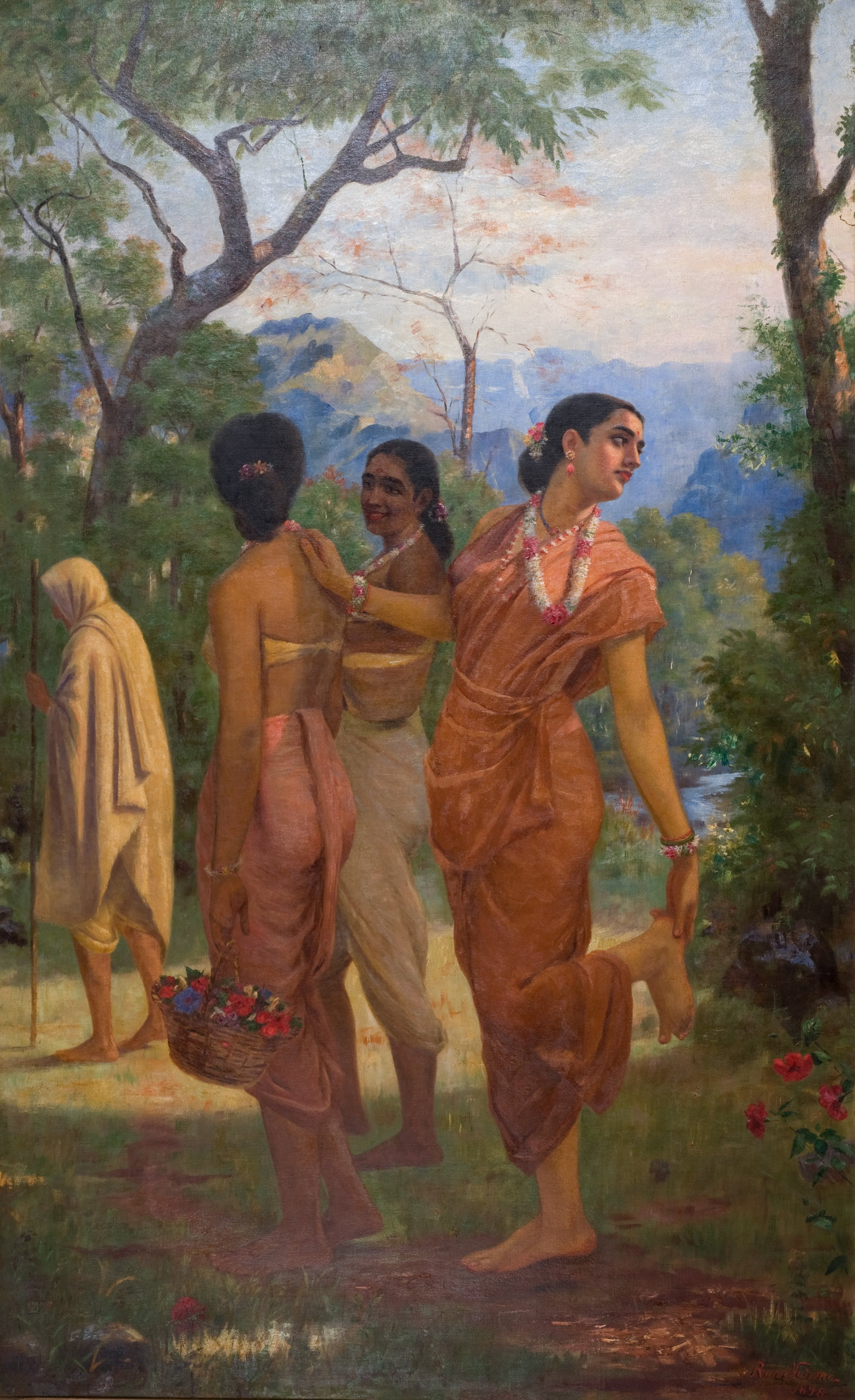
Shakuntala, wife of Dushyanta and the mother of Emperor Bharata, from Kalidasa's play Abhijñānaśākuntala, wearing a sari, painting by Raja Ravi Varma.

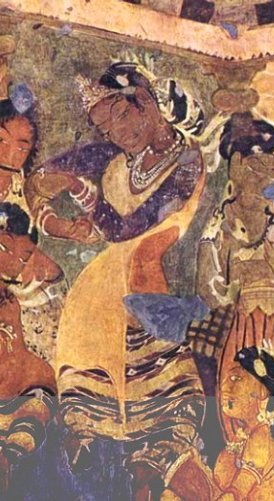
Dancing girl in choli; Gupta Empire.

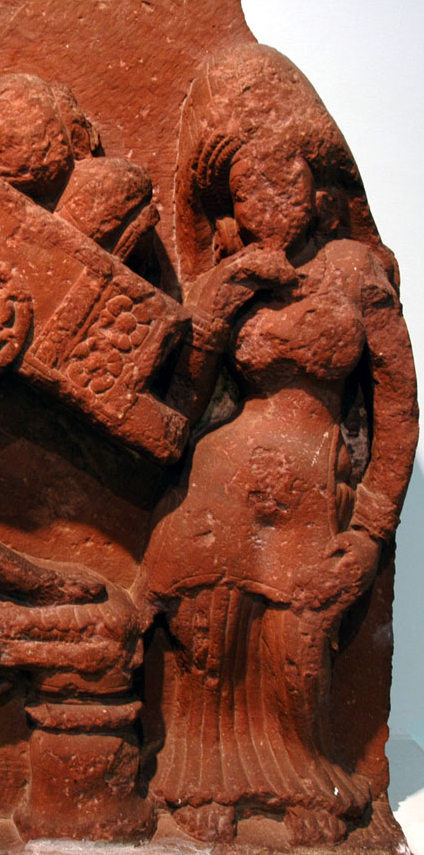
Gupta-period depiction of women in Ghagra choli, 320–550 AD, Uttar Pradesh, India.

New trade routes, both overland and overseas, created a cultural exchange with Central Asia and Europe. Romans bought indigo for dyeing and cotton cloth as articles of clothing. Trade with China via the Silk Road introduced silk textiles using domesticated silkworms. Chanakya's treatise on public administration, the Arthashastra written around the third century BC, briefly describes the norms followed in silk weaving.

A variety of weaving techniques were employed in ancient India, many of which survive to the present day. Silk and cotton were woven into various designs and motifs, each region developing its distinct style and technique. Famous among these weaving styles were the Jamdani, Kasika vastra of Varanasi, butidar, and the Ilkal saree. Brocades of silk were woven with gold and silver threads. The Mughals played a vital role in the enhancement of the art, and the paisley and Latifa Buti are examples of Mughal influence.

Dyeing of clothes in ancient India was practised as an art form. Five primary colours (Suddha-varnas) were identified, and complex colours (Misra – varnas) were categorised by their many hues. Sensitivity was shown to the most subtle of shades; the ancient treatise, Vishnudharmottara states five tones of white, namely Ivory, Jasmine, August moon, August clouds after the rain and the conch shell. The commonly used dyes were indigo(Nila), madder red and safflower. (Note: These were vegetable dyes, commonly used in textiles. Non-vegetable dyes were also used, such as gairika (red ochre), sindura (red lead), kajal (lampblack), sulphate of iron, sulphate of antimony and carmine.) The technique of mordant dyeing was prevalent in India since the second millennium BC. Resist dyeing and Kalamkari techniques were hugely popular and such textiles were the chief exports.

Integral to the history of Indian clothing is the Kashmiri shawl. Kashmiri shawl varieties include the Shahtoosh, popularly known as the 'ring shawl', and the pashmina wool shawls, historically called pashm. Textiles of wool find mention as long back as the Vedic times in association with Kashmir; the Rig Veda refers to the Valley of Sindh as being abundant in sheep, (Note: The Rig Veda, Mandala 10, hymn 75, mentions the valley of Sindhu as suvasa urnavati i.e home to plenty of sheep) and the god Pushan has been addressed as the 'weaver of garments', which evolved into the term pashm for the wool of the area. Woollen shawls have been mentioned in Afghan texts of the third century BC, but reference to the Kashmir work is made in the 16th century AD. The sultan of Kashmir, Zain-ul-Abidin, is generally credited with the founding of the industry. A story says that the Roman emperor Aurelian received a purple pallium from a Persian king, made of Asian wool of the finest quality. The shawls were dyed red or purple, red dye procured from cochineal insects and purple obtained by a mixture of red and blue from indigo The most prized Kashmiri shawls were the Jamavar and the Kanika Jamavar, woven using weaving spools with coloured thread called kani and a single shawl taking more than a year for completion and requiring 100 to 1500 kanis depending on the degree of elaboration.

Indian textiles were traded from ancient times with China, Southeast Asia, and the Roman Empire. The Periplus of the Erythraean Sea mentions mallow cloth, muslins, and coarse cottons. (Note: The Periplus states the various regions of production of cloth, including the Gangetic plain. Ancient Romans called Indian textiles by names such as gangetika, nebula and venti, meaning woven wind. Marco Polo's Description of the world gives an idea of the textile trade of the time, with a mention that Gujarat has the best textiles in the world.) Port towns like Masulipatnam and Barygaza won fame for their production of muslins and fine cloth. Trade with the Arabs, who were middlemen in the spice trade between India and Europe, brought Indian textiles into Europe, where they were favoured by royalty in the 17th–18th century. The Dutch, French and British East India Companies competed for monopoly of the spice trade in the Indian Ocean but were posed with the problem of payment for spices, which was in gold or silver. To counter this problem, bullion was sent to India to trade for the textiles, a major portion of which were subsequently traded for spices in other trade posts, which then were traded along with the remaining textiles in London. Printed Indian calicos, chintz, muslins and patterned silk flooded the British market, and in time the designs were copied onto imitation prints by textile manufacturers in Britain, reducing the dependence on India.

Opposition to British rule in India, in particular the 1905 partition of Bengal, sparked the nationwide Swadeshi movement. One of the integral aims of the movement was to attain self-sufficiency and to promote Indian goods while boycotting British goods in the market. This was idealised in the production of Khadi. Khadi and its products were encouraged by the nationalist leaders over British goods, while also being seen as a means to empower the rural artisans.

== Female clothing ==
In India, women's clothing varies widely and is closely associated with the local culture, religion, and climate.

Traditional Indian clothing for women across the country in Indian includes saris worn with choli tops; a skirt called a lehenga or chaniya worn with choli and a dupatta scarf to create an ensemble called a ghagra choli; while many south Indian children traditionally wear Langa voni.. Across India, saris are traditionally worn by married women, although in areas such as Rajasthan and Gujarat, for example, the chaniya choli (as it is called there) is worn by all ages. In many rural parts of India, traditional clothing is still worn today due to ease of materials, comfort and accessibility. Jewellery is hugely significant for Indian men and women. Men traditionally wear rings with stones or necklaces, and for women, there is an assortment of jewellery that includes maang-tikka, earrings, nose rings, necklaces, bangles, waist chains, anklets and toe-rings - these all form part of the traditional Solah Shringaar for married Hindu women. A Hindu religious mark called a tilak is usually applied with sandalwood or vermillion between the eyebrows, and as such, the modern iteration of the tilak known as a bindi is also worn. Indo-Western clothing is the fusion of Western and South Asian fashion. Other clothing includes the churidar, gamucha, kurti, kurta, dhoti, lungi and sherwani.

The traditional style of clothing in India varies with male or female distinctions. This is still followed in rural areas, though it is changing in the urban areas.

=== Traditional clothing ===
==== Sari and wrapped garments ====
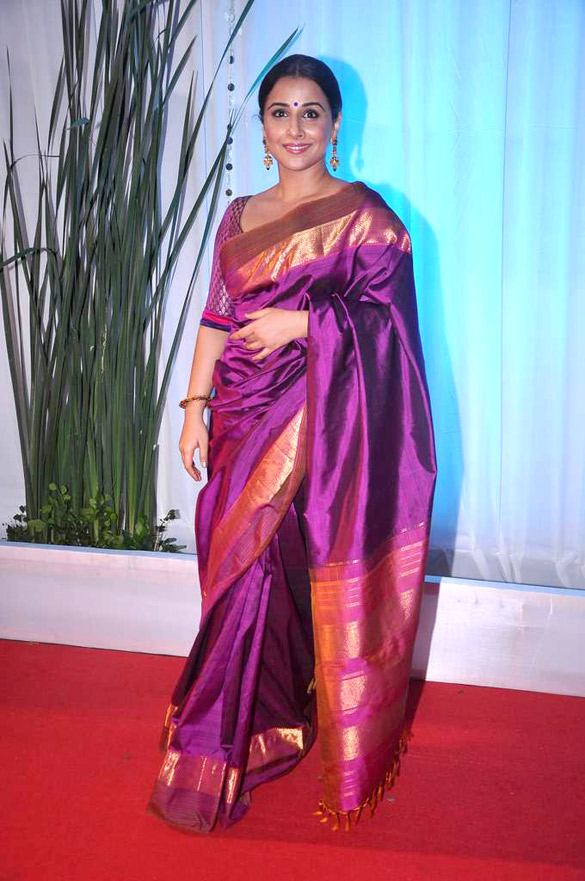
Purple silk sari worn by Vidya Balan.

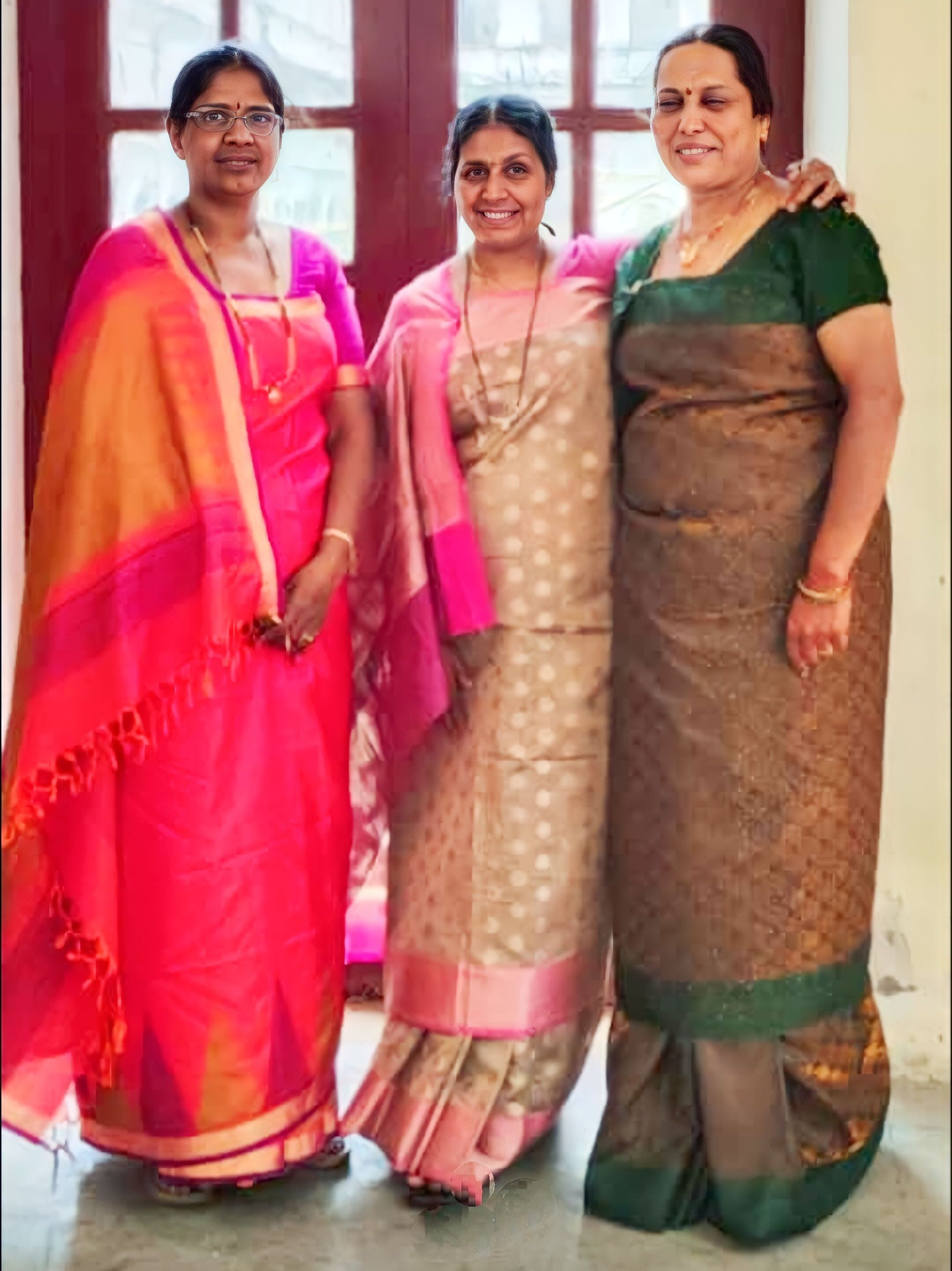
Women in Karnataka wearing Kodagu style sari.

A saree or sari is a female garment in the Indian subcontinent. A sari is a strip of unstitched cloth, ranging from four to nine metres in length, that is draped over the body in various styles. These include: Sambalpuri Saree from East, Mysore silk and Ilkal of Karnataka, Kanchipuram of Tamil Nadu from South, Paithani from Maharashtra and Banarasi from North, among others. The most common style is for the sari to be wrapped around the waist, with one end then draped over the shoulder baring the midriff. The sari is usually worn over a petticoat. Blouse may be "backless" or of a halter neck style. These are usually more dressy with a lot of embellishments such as mirrors or embroidery, and may be worn on special occasions. Women in the armed forces, when wearing a sari uniform, don a half-sleeve shirt tucked in at the waist. Teenage girls may wear half-sarees, a three-piece set consisting of a langa, a choli and a stole wrapped over it like a saree. Women usually wear full sarees. Indian wedding saris are typically red or pink, a tradition that goes back to India's pre-modern history.

Saris are usually known by different names in different places. In Kerala, white saris with golden borders are known as kavanis and are worn on special occasions. A simple white sari, worn as a daily wear, is called a mundu. Saris are called pudavai in Tamil Nadu. In Karnataka, saris are called Seere. The traditional production of handloom sarees is important to economic development in rural communities. The Sari Series provides a documented resource of over 80 different regional drapes of India.

Mundum Neriyathum

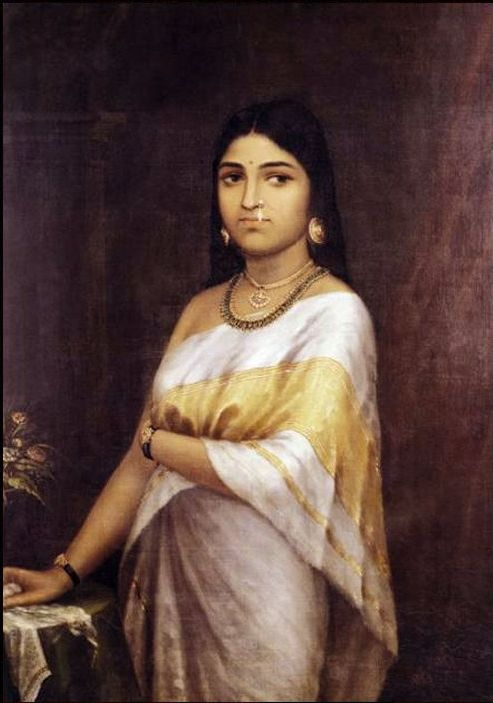
Malayalee lady wearing mundum neriyathum. Painted by Raja Ravi Varma, c. 1900.

Mundum Neriyathum is the oldest remnant of the ancient form of the saree, which covered only the lower part of the body. It is the traditional dress of women in Kerala, a state in the southwestern part of India. The basic traditional piece is the mundu or lower garment, which is the ancient form of the saree denoted in Malayalam as 'Thuni' (meaning cloth), while the neriyathu forms the upper garment of the mundu.

Mekhela Sador

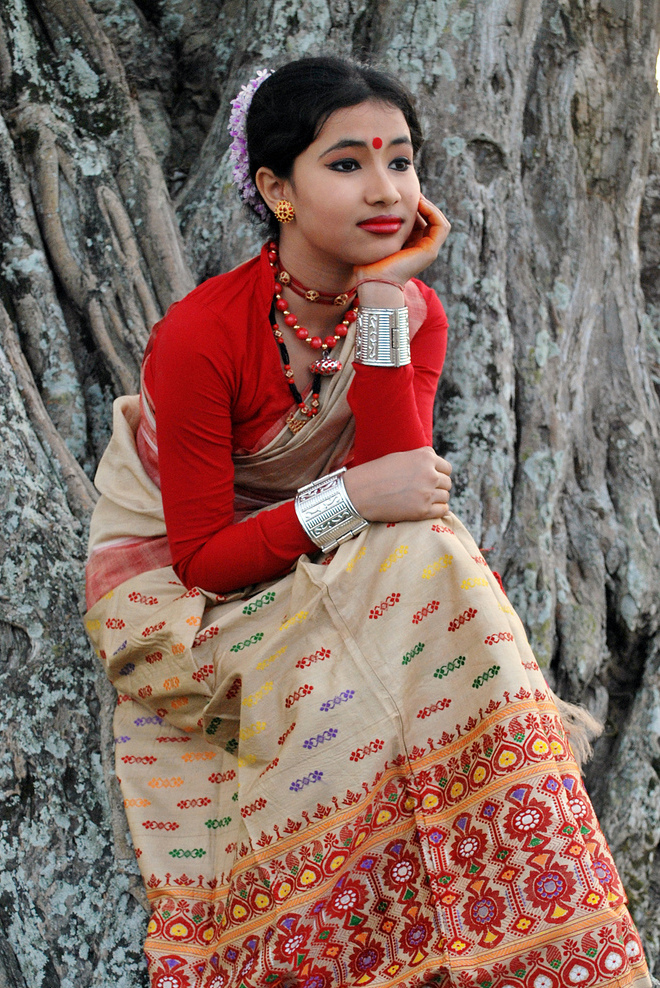
An Assamese girl wearing mekhela sador, 2010

Mekhela Sador (Assamese: মেখেলা চাদৰ) is the traditional Assamese dress worn by women. It is worn by women of all ages.

Three main pieces of cloth are draped around the body.

The bottom portion, draped from the waist downwards, is called the Mekhela (Assamese: মেখেলা). It is in the form of a sarong—a very wide cylinder of cloth—that is folded into pleats to fit around the waist and tucked in. The folds are to the right, as opposed to the pleats in the Nivi style of the saree, which are folded to the left. Strings are never used to tie the mekhela around the waist, though an underskirt with a string is often used.

The top portion of the three-piece dress, called the Sador (Assamese: চাদৰ), is a long length of cloth that has one end tucked into the upper portion of the Mekhela and the rest draped over and around the rest of the body. The Sador is tucked in triangular folds. A fitted blouse is worn to cover the breasts.

The third piece is called a Riha, which is worn under the Sador. It is narrow in width. This traditional dress of the Assamese women is very famous for its exclusive patterns on the body and the border. Women wear them during important religious and ceremonial occasions of marriage. Riha is worn exactly like a Sador and is used as Orni.

Rignai

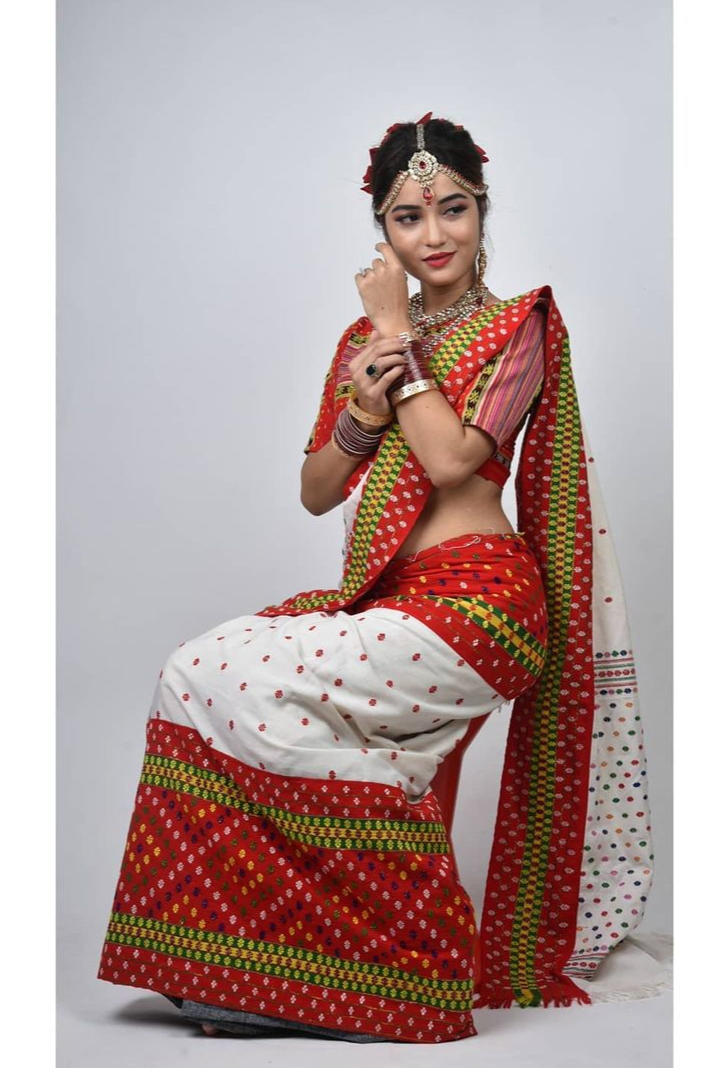
Tripuri bride in Rignai and Rikutu

Rignai is the traditional dress of Tripuri women, the native inhabitants of Tripura. It is worn by wrapping it around the waist. It's worn with "Rikutu" which covers the upper half of the body. It is worn by every Tripuri woman in Tripura.

The most significant rignai is called the "Chamathwi bar" and comprises white cloth bordered by maroon or other colours. The "Chamathwi bar" is worn during important occasions like wedding ceremonies and festivals like Goria Puja and Hangrai.

==== Salwar Kameez ====
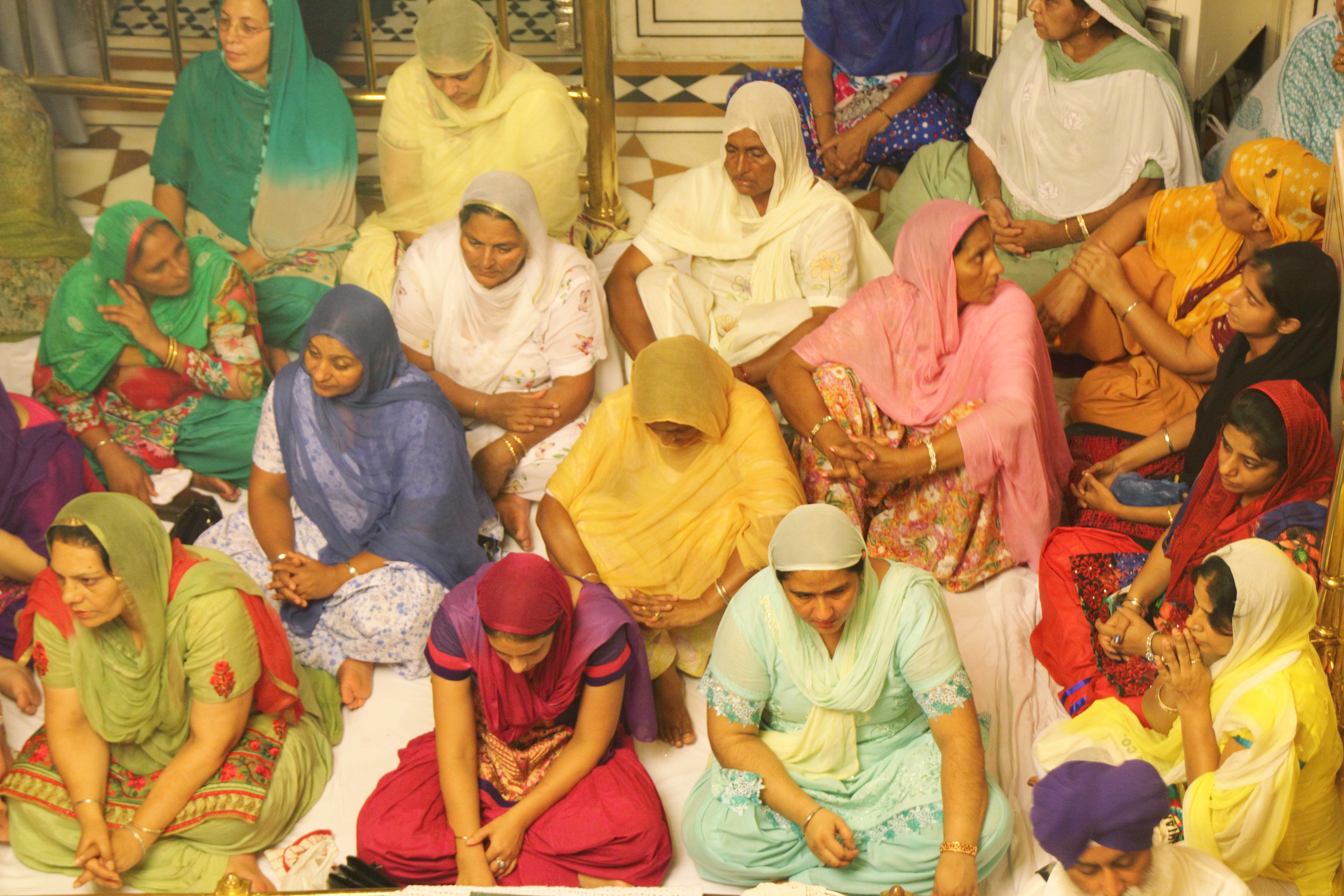
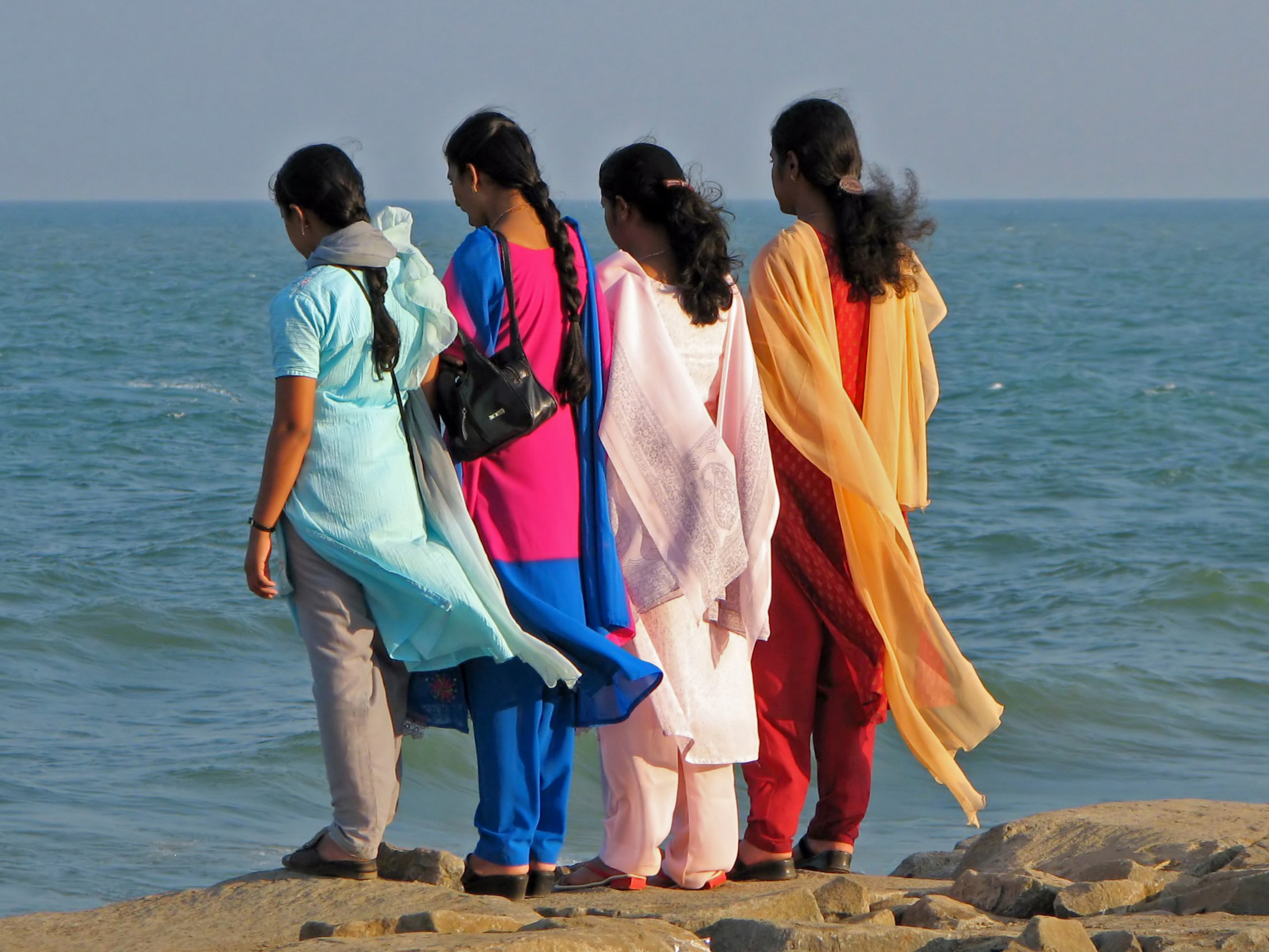
Sikh pilgrims in salwar kameez at the Harmandir Sahib in Punjab (left); Four women wearing Salwar Kameez in Puducherry, 2006 (right)

The salwar is a generic description of the lower garment incorporating the Punjabi salwar, Sindhi suthan, Dogri pyjama (also called suthan), and the Kashmiri suthan. The salwar kameez has been traditionally worn by the women of the Punjab region and neighbouring areas, including Punjab, Haryana, Himachal Pradesh and Jammu and Kashmir, where the ensemble has been called the Punjabi suit, salwar suit or simply suit. The Punjabi suit also includes the "churidaar" and "kurta" ensemble which is also popular in Southern India where it is known as the "churidaar".

The material for the dupatta usually depends upon that of the suit and is generally of cotton, georgette, silk, chiffon, among others.

The suthan, similar to the salwar is common in Sindh where it is worn with the cholo and Kashmir where it is worn with the Phiran. The Kashmiri phiran is similar to the Dogri pyjama. The patiala salwar is an exaggeratedly wide version of the salwar, its loose pleats stitched together at the bottom.

==== Churidaar ====
Churidaar is a variation on the Punjabi suit, which is worn by women across India as casual attire or dressed up for occasions as an alternative to the sari or lehenga choli.

The Punjabi suit trousers, called the salwar and worn in the Punjab regions of India and Pakistan, and across Pakistan generally, are baggy and caught in at the ankle.

However, the churidaar is tightly fitted, especially below the knees. The material for the leg length below the knee is exaggerated so that the material can bunch together at the ankle with horizontal gathers resembling a stack of bangles, which are known as ‘churi’ or ‘churiya’. The churidaar is worn with an upper garment such as a kurta top, and the length of this may vary depending on the wearer's choice. In India, many churidaar tops resemble the traditional choli as they include a tight-fitting bodice and ties at the back; however, extra material is added from the end of the choli at the midriff to make a knee-length top, for example. Churidaars are also worn with dupattas, also known as chunnaris.

Anarkali Suit

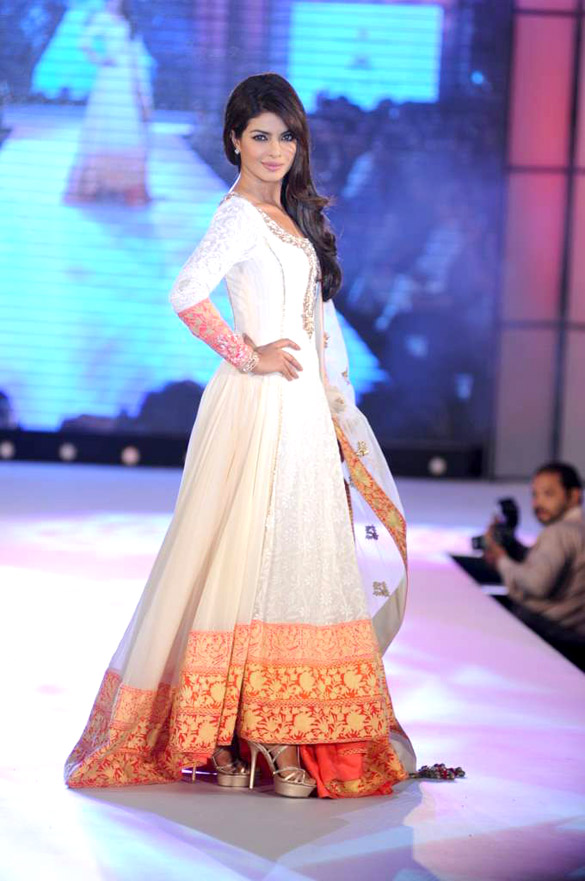
Priyanka Chopra, a Bollywood actress, in an Anarkali suit.

The Anarkali suit is made up of a long, frock-style top and features a leggings-style bottom. The Anarkali is worn by some women in Northern India and is mostly found in Pakistan and the Middle East. The Anarkali suit varies in many different lengths and embroideries, including floor-length Anarkali styles. Many women will also opt for heavier embroidered Anarkali suits on wedding functions and events.

Some Indian women wear Anarkali suits on occasions as well, such as parties, casual lunches, etc. In India, the Anarkali is sleeveless or with sleeves ranging from cap- to elbow-length.

==== Lehenga Choli (skirt and blouse) ====
A Ghagra Choli or a Lehenga Choli is the traditional clothing of women in Rajasthan and Gujarat. Some Punjabis also wear them, and they are used in some of their folk dances. It is a combination of lehenga, a tight choli and an odhani. A lehenga is a form of a long skirt that is pleated. It is usually embroidered or has a thick border at the bottom. A choli is a blouse which is cut to fit the body; it is cropped exposing the midriff, and is tied at the back with naaris or ties made from the same cloth.

Different styles of ghagra cholis are worn by Indian women, ranging from a simple cotton lehenga choli as daily wear, a traditional ghagra with mirrors embellished, usually worn during Navratri for the garba dance or a fully embroidered lehenga worn during the traditional Hindu and Sikh wedding ceremonies.

Popular among unmarried women other than Ghagra choli and Langa voni are kurta tops worn over jeans or light cotton trousers.

Pattu Pavadai/Reshme Langa

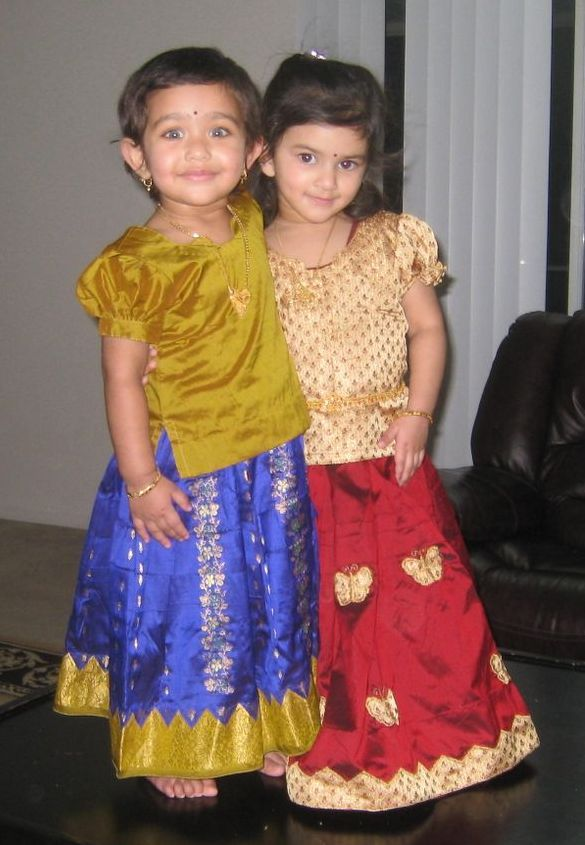
Two girls wearing Pattu Pavadai.

Pattu Pavadai or Langa davani is a traditional dress in South India, usually worn by teenage and small girls. The pavada is a cone-shaped skirt, usually of silk, that hangs down from the waist to the toes. It normally has a golden border at the bottom.

Girls in South India often wear pattu pavadai or Langa davani during traditional functions.

A version of this is worn by girls in Rajasthan before marriage (and after marriage, with sight modification in certain sections of society)

Langa - Voni/Dhavani

This is a type of South Indian dress mainly worn in Karnataka, Andhra Pradesh, and Tamil Nadu, as well as in some parts of Kerala. This dress is a three-piece garment where the langa is the cone-shaped, long, flowing skirt.

== Male clothing ==
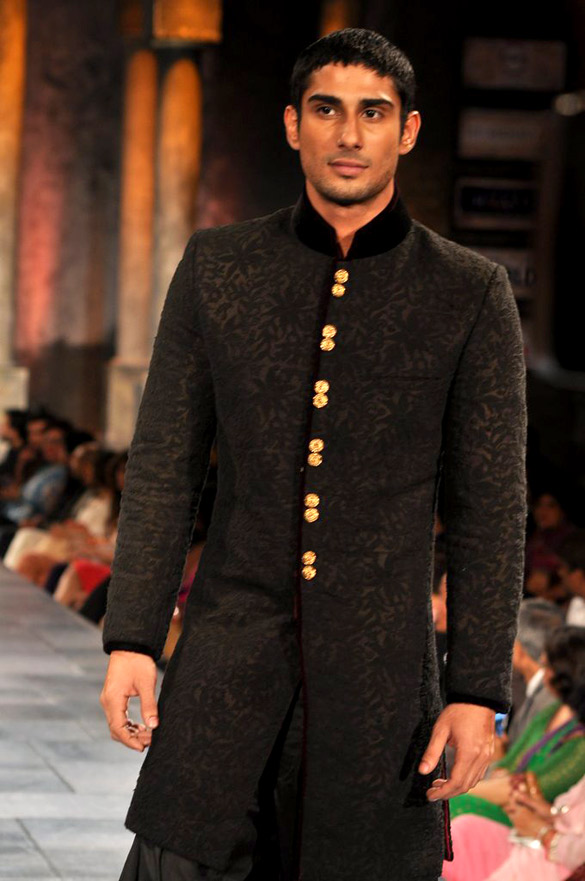
Bollywood actor Prateik Smita Patil in Sherwani

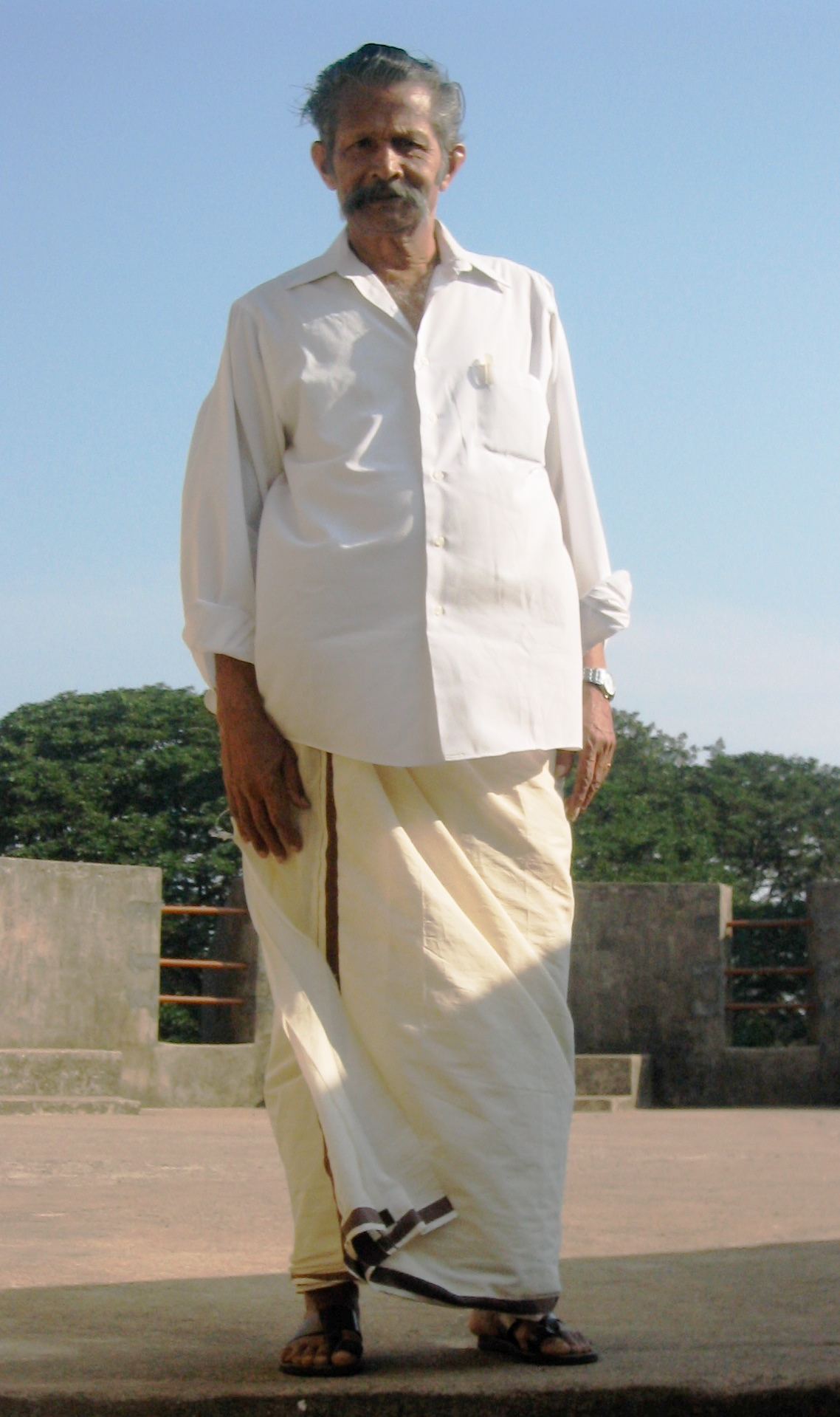
A man wearing a dhoti.

=== Traditional clothing ===
For men, traditional clothes are the Achkan/Sherwani, Bandhgala, Lungi, Kurta, Angarkha, Jama, Dhoti or Kurta Pajama.

==== Undergarments ====
A kaupinam is unsewn while the langota is a sewn loincloth typically worn as underwear in dangal held in akharas, especially wrestling, in order to prevent hernias and hydrocele.

It is mandatory for Sikhs to wear kacchera.

It is held in place by a style of wrapping and sometimes with the help of a belt, either as an ornamental and embroidered piece or a flat and simple one, secured around the waist.

Owing to its widespread popularity throughout India, different languages have different terms to describe dhotis. In Marathi, it is called dhotar. In Punjabi, it is known as a chadra. In Gujarati, it's known as "Dhotiyu", while in Telugu they are called Pancha. In Tamil, they are called veyti, and over the dhoti, men wear shirts or kurtas.

==== Panche or Lungi ====
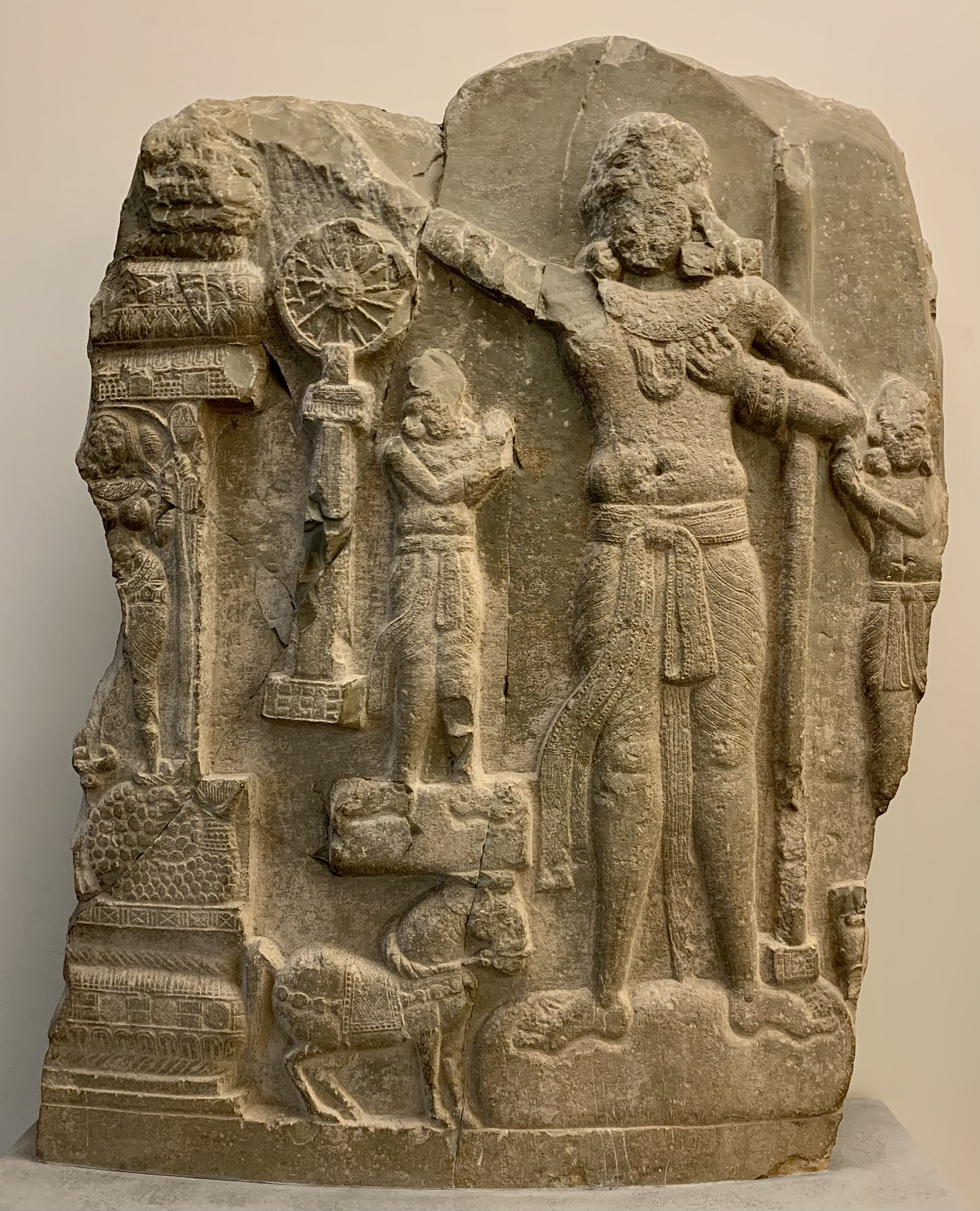
A Chakravartin wearing a pancha. Amaravathi, Andhra Pradesh; first century BCE. (Musee Guimet)

A Lungi is another traditional garment of India. A Mundu is a lungi, except that it is always white. It is either tucked in, over the waist, up to knee-length, or is allowed to lie over and reach up to the ankle. It is usually tucked in when the person is working, in fields or workshops, and left open usually as a mark of respect, in worship places, or when the person is around dignitaries.

Lungis, generally, are of two types: the open lungi and the stitched lungi. The open lungi is a plain sheet of cotton or silk, whereas the stitched one has both of its open ends stitched together to form a tube-like structure.

Though mostly worn by men, elderly women also prefer lungi to other garments owing to its good aeration. It is most popular in south India, though people of Bangladesh, Brunei, Indonesia, Malaysia, Myanmar, and Somalia also can be seen in lungis, because of the heat and humidity, which create an unpleasant climate for trousers, though trousers have now become common outside the house.

==== Achkan ====
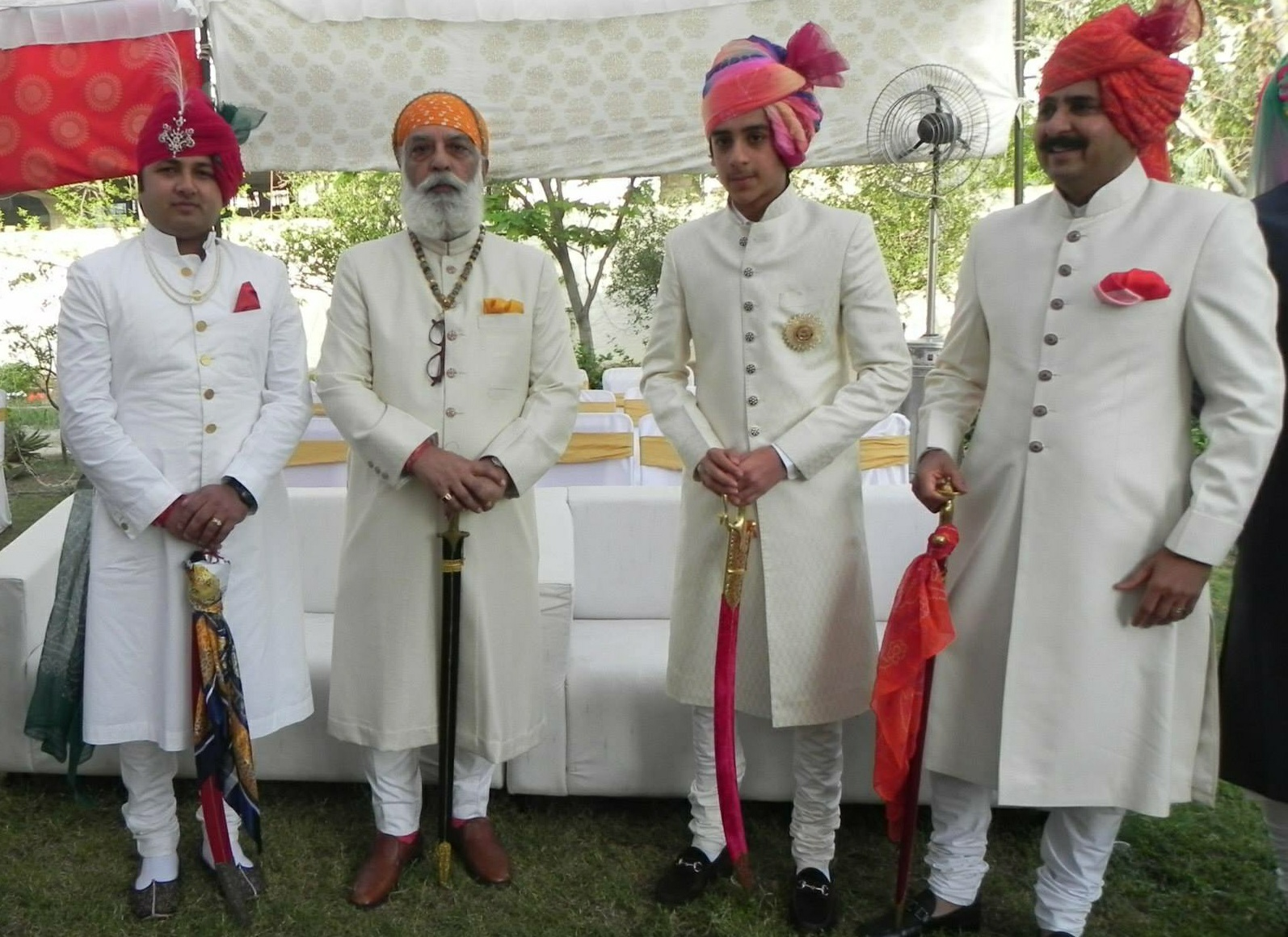
Achkan sherwani and churidar (lower body) worn by Arvind Singh Mewar and his kin during a Hindu wedding in Rajasthan, India.

An Achkan is a small jacket that usually sports exposed buttons throughout the length of the jacket. The length is usually just at the knees, and the jacket ends just below the knee. Achkan is very similar to the Sherwani, which is a much longer coat-jacket dress. The jacket has a Nehru collar. The Achkan was mostly worn with tight-fitting pants or trousers called churidars. An achkan is made from various fabrics for both formal and informal occasions. The achkan features traditional Indian embroidery like gota and badla. Achkan was commonly worn by the grooms during wedding ceremonies or other formal festive occasions in the Indian subcontinent, but when it evolved into the Nehru Jacket, the achkan became less worn. It was used by men. In India, the achkan is generally worn for formal occasions in winter, especially by those from Rajasthan, Punjab, Uttar Pradesh and Hyderabad. The achkan later evolved into the Nehru Jacket, which is now popular in India. It may be embroidered with gold or silver. A scarf called a dupatta is sometimes added to the achkan.

==== Bandhgala ====
A Jodhpuri or a Bandhgala is a formal evening suit from India. It originated in the Jodhpur State, and was popularised during the British Raj in India. Also known as Jodhpuri Suit, it is a western style suit product, with a coat and a trouser, at times accompanied by a vest. It brings together the western cut with Indian hand-embroidery escorted by the Waist coat. It is suitable for occasions such as weddings and formal gatherings.

The material can be silk or any other suiting material. Normally, the material is lined at the collar and at the buttons with embroidery. This can be plain, jacquard, or jamewari material. Normally, the trousers match those of the coat. There is also a trend now to wear contrasting trousers to match the coat colour. Bandhgala quickly became a popular formal and semi-formal uniform across Rajasthan and eventually throughout India.

==== Angarkha ====
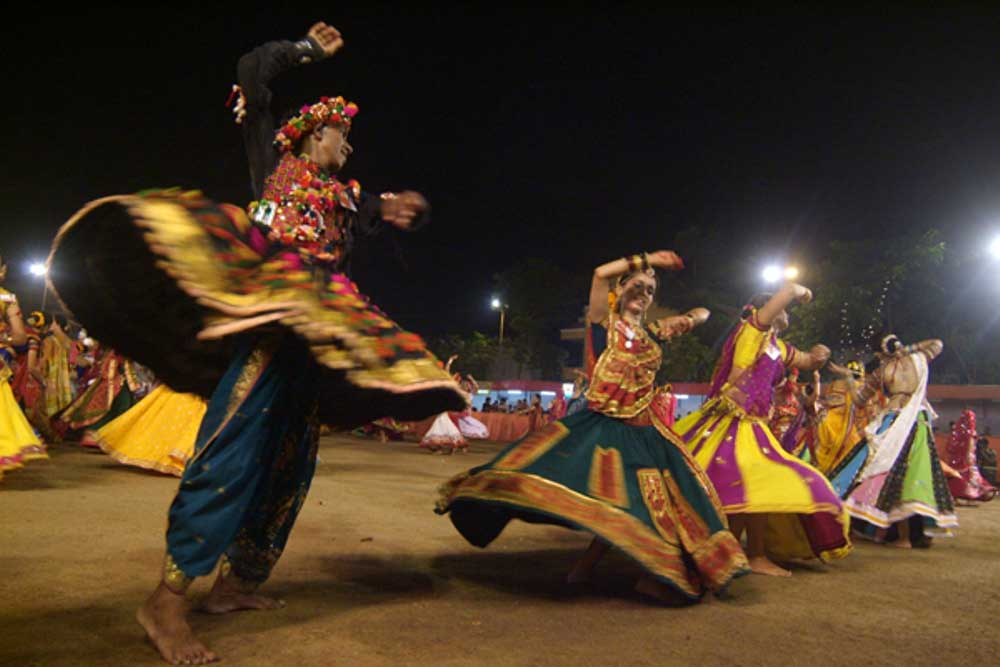
Garba dancers, Ahmedabad. On the left, a male dancer in a Gujarati Angarakha

The term angarkha is derived from the Sanskrit word Aṅgarakṣaka, which means protection of the body. The angarkha was worn in various parts of the Indian subcontinent, but while the basic cut remained the same, styles and lengths varied from region to region. Angarakha is a traditional upper garment worn in the Indian subcontinent, which overlaps and is tied to the left or right shoulder. Historically, the Angrakha was a court outfit that a person could wrap around himself, offering flexible ease with the knots and ties appropriate for wearing in the various principalities of ancient India.

==== Jama ====
The jama is a long coat that was popular during the Mughal period. There are many types of jama costumes which were worn in various regions of South Asia, the use of which began to wane by the end of the 19th century A.D. However, men in parts of Kutch still wear the jama also known as the angarkha which has an asymmetric opening with the skirt flaring out to around the hips. However, some styles fall to below the knees.

=== Headgear ===
The Indian turban or the pagri is worn in many regions in the country, incorporating various styles and designs depending on the place. Other types of headgear, such as the Taqiyah and Gandhi cap, are worn by different communities within the country to signify a common ideology or interest.

==== Dastar ====
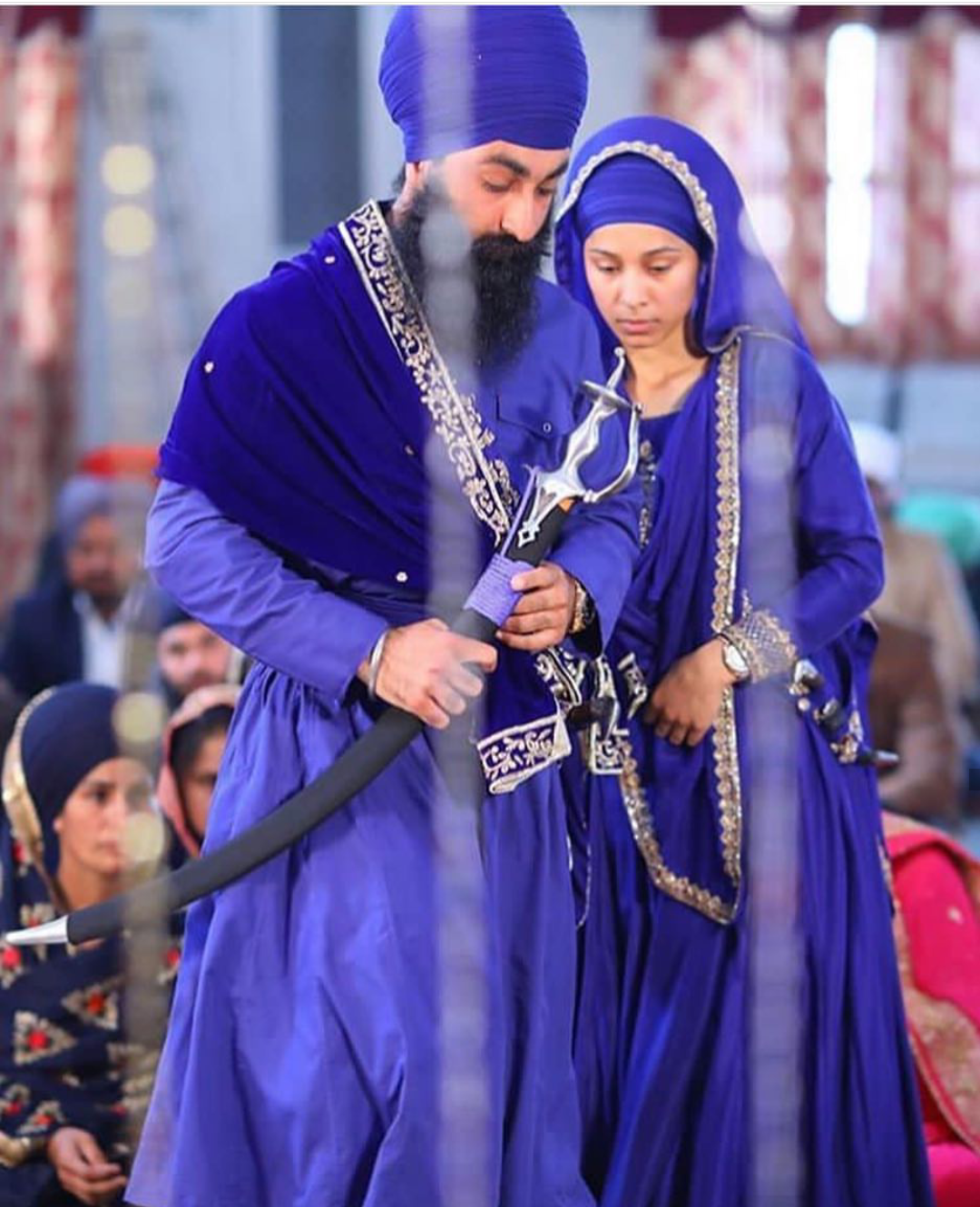
Sikh man and women wearing Turban

The Dastar, also known as a pagri, is a turban worn by the Sikh community of India. Is a symbol of faith representing values such as valour, honour and spirituality, among others. It is worn to protect the Sikh's long, uncut hair, the Kesh which is one of the Five Ks of Sikhism. Over the years, the dastar has evolved into different styles pertaining to the various sects of Sikhism such as the Nihang and the Namdhari.

==== Pheta ====
Pheta is the Marathi name for turbans worn in the state of Maharashtra. It's usually worn during traditional ceremonies and occasions. It was a mandatory part of clothing in the past, and has evolved into various styles in different regions. The main types are the Puneri Pagadi, Kolhapuri and Mawali pheta.

==== Mysore Peta ====
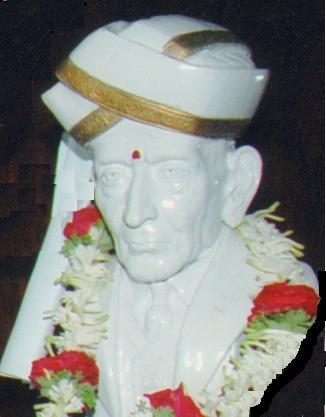
Traditional Mysore Peta on a bust of M. Visvesvaraya

Originally worn by the kings of Mysore during formal meeting in durbar and in ceremonial processions during festivals, and meeting with foreign dignitaries, the Mysore peta has come to signify the cultural tradition of the Mysore and Kodagu district. The Mysore University replaced the conventional mortarboard used in graduation ceremonies with the traditional peta.

==== Rajasthani safa ====
Turbans in Rajasthan are called pagari or "safa". They are distinctive in style and colour, and indicate the caste, social class and region of the wearer. In the hot and dry regions, turbans are large and loose. The paggar is traditional in Mewar while the safa is to Marwar. The colour of the pagaris have special importance and so does the pagari itself. In the past, saffron stood for valour and chivalry. A white turban stood for mourning. The exchange of a turban meant undying friendship.

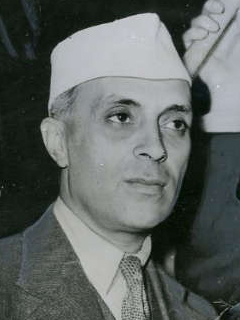
Jawaharlal Nehru wearing the Gandhi cap, 1946

==== Gandhi topi ====
The Gandhi cap, a white coloured cap made of khadi, was popularised by Mahatma Gandhi during the Indian independence movement. The practice of wearing a Gandhi cap was carried on even after independence and became a symbolic tradition for politicians and social activists. The cap has been worn throughout history in many states such as Gujarat, Maharashtra, Uttar Pradesh and West Bengal and is still worn by many people without political significance. In 2013, the cap regained its political symbolism through the Aam Aadmi Party, which flaunted Gandhi caps with "I am a Common Man" written over it. This was partly influenced by the "I Am Anna" caps used during Anna Hazare's Lokpal movement. During the 2013 Delhi Legislative Assembly election, these caps led to a scuffle between Aam Aadmi Party and Congress workers, based on the reasoning that Gandhi caps were being used for political benefits.

==== The Kashmir shawl ====
One of India's most famous exports was the Kashmir shawl, distinctive for its Kashmiri weave, and traditionally made of shahtoosh or pashmina wool. Valued for its warmth, lightweight, and characteristic buta design, the Kashmir shawl was originally used by Mughal royalty and nobility. In the late 18th century, it arrived in Europe, where its use by Queen Victoria of the United Kingdom and Empress Joséphine of France popularised it as a symbol of exotic luxury and status. It became a toponym for the Kashmir region itself (as cashmere), inspiring mass-produced imitation industries in Europe, and popularising the buta, today known as the Paisley motif. Today, it continues to be a symbol of luxury in the Western world, commonly used as a gift to visiting dignitaries and used by public figures.

== Contemporary clothing ==
During the 1960s and 1970s, at the same time as Western fashion was absorbing elements of Indian dress, Indian fashion also began to actively absorb elements of Western dress. Throughout the 1980s and 1990s, Western designers enthusiastically incorporated traditional Indian crafts, textiles and techniques in their work at the same time as Indian designers allowed the West to influence their work. By the turn of the 21st century, both Western and Indian clothing had intermingled, creating a unique style of clothing for the typical urban Indian population. Women started wearing more comfortable clothing, and exposure to international fashion led to a fusion of western and Indian styles of clothing. While women have the choice to wear either Western or traditional dress to work, most Indian multinational companies insist that male employees wear Western dress.

Women's clothing in India nowadays consists of both formal and casual wear, such as gowns, pants, shirts, and tops. Traditional Indian clothing, such as the kurti has been combined with jeans to form part of casual attire. Fashion designers in India have blended several elements of Indian traditional designs into conventional Western wear to create a unique style of contemporary Indian fashion.

== See also ==
- Fashion designers of India
- Fashion in India
- Kimkhwab
- 1950s in Indian fashion
- 1960s in Indian fashion
- 1970s in Asian fashion
- 1980s in Indian fashion
- National Institute of Fashion Technology
- 1990s in Indian fashion
- 2000s in Indian fashion
- 2010s in Indian fashion

== Bibliography ==
- J.Forbes Watson (1866). The Textile Manufactures and the Costumes of the People of India. India Office by George Edward Eyre and William Spottiswoode, London.
- Illustrations of the Textile Manufactures of India. Victoria & Albert Museum, London. 1881.
- Albert Buell Lewis (1924). Block Prints from India for Textiles. Field Museum for Natural History, Chicago.
