= Bengali traditional dress =

Clothing traditions of West Bengal, India

Bengali traditional dress encompasses the clothing traditions of the Indian state of West Bengal. The attire has been influenced by centuries of cultural evolution, religious practices, and geographical conditions. Bengali clothing is renowned for its simplicity, elegance, and comfort while showcasing intricate artistry and vibrant designs.

== Men's traditional attire ==
- Panjabi: Also known as a kurta, is a traditional upper-body garment worn by men in Bengal. It is a long, loose-fitting shirt, typically reaching the knees, and is often made of cotton or silk. It features intricate embroidery, patterns, or minimal designs, paired with a lungi or pajama for formal or cultural occasions, as well as for casual wearing.
- Lungi: A traditional wraparound garment worn by men in Bengal, typically made of cotton. It features vibrant checks, stripes, or floral patterns, and is secured by folding or knotting at the waist. Comfortable and breathable, it is worn casually or formally, reflecting regional identity and practicality.
- Dhoti: A long piece of unstitched cloth, traditionally white or cream-colored, wrapped around the waist and legs. It is often paired with a panjabi.
- Sherwani: A local styled, long, elegant coat worn over a kurta, made of silk or brocade, often embroidered with zari or sequins. It features a high collar and fitted sleeves, paired with trousers or churidar. A symbol of sophistication, it's worn at weddings and grand events, reflecting mostly;Bengali Muslim cultural heritage.

== Women's traditional attire ==
- Saree: The saree is the most iconic dress for Bengali women. It is a long piece of fabric, draped elegantly over the body. Popular Bengali sarees include:
