= Sarpotdar =

Sarpotdar is a family name found mainly among the Maharashtrian people in India. It is derived from the Mughal title Sarpotdar. The Persian word "pota" which means "treasure": the treasurer in Mughal times was called "Potdar" and the chief treasurer would be "Sarpotdar". Later on, the nature of this job changed to somewhat like Inspector General of Currencies.

== Origin ==
Sarpotdars originate from Ratnagiri district in the konkan region of Maharashtra (India) and belong to the Karhade Brahmin community. They are predominantly from Anjanari, Nandivali and Padvan and one of their branches had settled at Godhra in Gujarat. Their surname earlier was Orpe and was subsequently changed to Sarpotdar possibly in the 16th century. Their Kuladaivat (family deity) is Laxmi Ravalnath of marcela (Mashel) and Pernem (Pedne) in Goa.

== Historical background ==
The first known ancestor of Sarpotdars Ravalopant Orpe Sarpotdar came to Fort Vishalgad i.e. ‘khelana’ from Bidar, a political city in Karnataka, in the late 16th century. Since then various generations of Sarpotdars worked on the Fort Vishalgad as administrative officers on different posts.

Evidences show that Narayan Timaji alias Naropant Sarpotdar was the in charge of Kothi & Ambarkhana i.e. ‘Food stocks & treasure’ in pre-shivaji times.

== Family heroes ==
- Narayan Timaji's son Ranganath alias Rango Narayan is supposed to be the first family hero who joined Shivaji and worked for him and his successor Sambhaji as their officer throughout his life. When Shivaji escaped from ‘Fort Panhala’ and reached ‘Fort Vishalgad’ (after Baji Prabhu episode) with Adilshahi troops on his back, Shivaji ordered Rango Narayan to attack the enemy at once. Rango Narayan, the then In-Charge of the Fort Vishalgad, attacked the Adilshahi troops (headed by Shiddi Masood, Suryarao Surve and Jaswantrao) camping around the fort, defeated them and turned them away back to Fort Panhala. Delighted with his great victory, Shivaji awarded Rango Narayan handsomely.
- In the last decade of the 17th century, Kashi Ranganath; the elder son of Rango Narayan bravely fought with the troops of Aurangzeb and captured Fort Panhala under the leadership of Parshuram Pant Pratinidhi in 1692. For this, Chhatrapati Rajaram rewarded him village 'Shembavane' near Malkapur.
- In 1702, a memorandum of understanding was signed between Pratinidhi & Aurangzeb as a result of which Fort Vishalgad was handed over to the Mughals for a huge consideration. The younger son of Rango Narayan namely Shamji Ranganth, however, made a conspiracy with other two officials and handed over the Fort back to the Marathas in 1707. Shamji Ranganath had worked as Havaldar of Vishalgad for more than six years.
- 1702 onwards Rango Narayan's nephew Govind Purushottam Sarpotdar was in the civil service of the Maratha Empire as 'Deshadhikari' that is Governor of the konkan prant.
- Sarpotdars remained as officers even in Peshwas’ times and worked on different posts such as 'Governor', 'Finance Controller' & 'Chief Administrator' over generation by generation. Vitthal Apaji 'Sabnis' was the last Sarpotdar working as Administrator on the Fort until its demolition in 1844 by the British. Nrusinha Mandir on the fort was built by Vitthal Apaji. The well known 'Pant Pratinidhi Bakhar' was researched and written by him on request by the British Government.

== Notable people ==
- Madhukar Sarpotdar (Ex Parliamentary Leader of Shivsena)
- Aditya Sarpotdar (Film director)

== Sources ==
- ‘History of Sarpotdars’ by Harshad Sarpotdar
- 'Pant Pratinidhi Bakhar'(Marathi)
- 'Kille Vishalgad' (Marathi) by P.B.Shirwalkar

== See also ==
- Battle of Pavan Khind
