= Rango Narayan Orpe =

Maratha general

Rangnath Narayan Orpe

General of Maratha Army
- Monarchs: Shivaji I, Sambhaji

Personal details
- Occupation: Kiladar of Vishalgad

Military service
- Allegiance: Maratha Empire
- Service: Maratha Army
- Years of service: c. 1659 - 1684
- Battles/wars: Battle of Vishalgad

Rangnath Narayan Orpe, historically mentioned as ‘Rango Narayan’, was a warrior and administrative officer on Fort Vishalgad, under the regime of Shivaji, founder of the Maratha Empire and his son Sambhaji in the 17th century India. He is known for defeating the Bijapur army in the battle of Vishalgad in July 1660.

== Background ==
Rango Narayan was born in the historical Sarpotdar family of Karhade Brahmin, settled in Vishalgad since late 16th century. His father Naropant was the chief of Kothi and Ambarkhana i.e. Food Stocks & Treasure in the regime of Mohammed Adil Shah, Sultan of Bijapur.

== Early life ==
It seems during 1659, Rango Narayan was the 'In charge' of the fort Vishalgad as Adilshahi General Afzalkhan sent a letter to him asking him to join his hands in the campaign against Shivaji. He has also given certain promises. However, Rango Narayan did not respond. Probably, he had already conspired with Shivaji, because immediately after Afzal Khan's defeat and death, Shivaji attached the fort to the proposed Maratha Empire on November, 1659. In the same year, Shivaji wrote a letter to Udhaji Ahir Rao, the then Killedar of the fort Vishalgad, ordering him to hand over the charge of Karkhanisi to Rango Narayan. The sequence of incidents proves that Rango Narayan helped Shivaji in capturing the fort.

== Battle of Vishalgad ==
On July 1660, when Shivaji escaped from Panhala fort and reached Vishalgad after the Battle of Pavan Khind, he ordered Rango Narayan to attack the Adilshahi troops by camping around the fort. Rango Narayan did the job up to complete satisfaction of Shivaji.

Adilshahi troops headed by Siddhi Masood, Suryarao Surve and Jaswantrao Dalavi were attacked from a hill called Gonimooth, fiercely beaten and turned back to fort Panhala by the Marathas, headed by Rango Narayan. He was handsomely rewarded by Shivaji for his great performance. Later, during his coronation ceremony in June 1674, Shivaji conferred on him the honor of ‘Palkhi’ and doubled his remuneration.

== Later life and inheritance ==
After Shivaji’s death in 1680, he continued working for Chhatrapati Sambhaji as his officer in confidence on Vishalgad. References indicate that he was rewarded by Sambhaji for discharging his responsibilities successfully while constructing the fortresses of fort Vishalgad during 1683–1684. There is no mention as to the year of his death, however, several sources are available about the battles fought and diplomacy shown from time to time by his sons Kashi Rangnath and Shamji Rangnath in the regimes of Chhatrapati Rajaram and Tarabai.

His heirs include the eminent historian Datto Vaman Potdar.

== See also ==
- Shivaji
- Battle of Pavan Khind
- List of Marathi people
- Sarpotdar
