= Mahacharya =

Honorific spiritual title in Indian religious traditions

Mahāchārya (Sanskrit: महाचार्य, *mahācārya*) is an honorific spiritual title used in Hinduism, Buddhism, and Jainism. It means "great teacher" or "senior preceptor" and is conferred upon individuals recognized for their philosophical contributions, spiritual realization, or authority within a lineage (sampradāya).

== Etymology ==
The word derives from two Sanskrit roots: mahā (मह) meaning "great" and ācārya (आचार्य) meaning "teacher" or "preceptor". Together, *mahācārya* translates as "great teacher"—an emphatic form of the more commonly used title ācārya.

== Traditional usage ==
=== Hinduism ===
In Vedanta and Tantra traditions, the title Mahāchārya is used for gurus who lead major spiritual schools or transmit teachings within a recognized lineage. In some cases, it overlaps with other titles such as Mahāmandaleśvara or Jagadguru. The title is also applied to teachers who combine scriptural knowledge with direct experiential practice, especially in yoga, meditation, or ritual contexts.

=== Buddhism ===
In Mahāyāna and Vajrayāna Buddhism, Mahāchārya refers to a teacher with initiation authority and advanced understanding of tantric or esoteric texts. Historical references associate the title with figures like Nāgārjuna and Padmasambhava. In institutions such as Nālandā and Vikramaśīla, mahāchāryas were masters who taught the highest doctrines and tantra.

=== Jainism ===
In Jainism, the term may denote a senior monk or doctrinal authority within the Śramaṇa tradition, responsible for instructing other ascetics and interpreting canonical texts.

== Contemporary use ==
In modern contexts, the title Mahāchārya is used by spiritual schools and yoga organizations to recognize teachers with philosophical authority, spiritual realization, or significant institutional leadership. Notable contemporary holders of this title include:

- Hamsah Manarah – founder of Aumist Teachings.
- Dr. Bhadreshdas Swami – Sanskrit scholar and spiritual leader, awarded the titles Mahāchārya and Mahāmāhopādhyāya by the Indian Council of Philosophical Research.
- Malay Desai – spiritual successor of Amrit Yoga tradition, referred to as Mahāchārya since 2012.
- Kseniya Nikitina – Russian yoga educator publicly identified with the Mahāchārya title on official platforms and in national media.
- Prof. Néstor Cesarini – listed as Mahāchārya and Latin America regional director by the World Yoga Federation.
- Marcello Rebottaro – founder of the South American Yoga Federation.

== See also ==
- Guru
- Spiritual teacher
- Hindu honorifics
