= Jammu dress =

The people of Jammu have the following traditional clothing:

== Ghagra choli ==
It is traditional for women to wear ghagra choli and the scarf ensemble which was also popular in the Punjab. It is still traditional for women to wear the kurta with a lehnga, as an alternative to the suthan and kurta.

== Peshwaj ==
The traditional ghagra choli was then replaced by the peshwaj for women which flows to the ankles which would sometimes be worn with a suthan (very loose pants with many folds). The men would wear the jamma (Mughal style shirt) with the suthan.

== Suthan and kurta ==
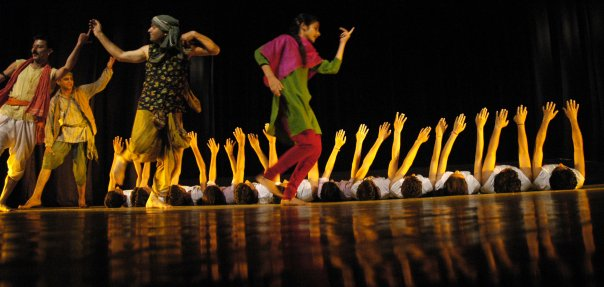
Men and boys wearing a variation of the suthan and Dogri kurta

The traditional dress for men and women is to wear the suthan and kurta but the styles are gender-specific.

== Dogri suthan ==
The traditional Dogri suthan is wide at the top, roomy at the legs and has numerous pleats at the ankles.

== Modern suthan ==
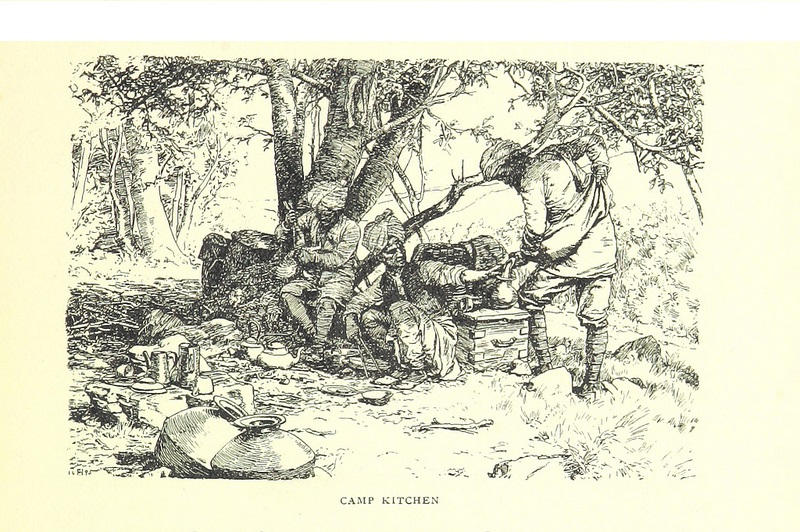
Men of the Indian Army in Punjabi churidar suthans (1895 Punjab Hills)

However, the modern style of suthan worn in Jammu is a remnant of the tight suthan which was once popular throughout the Punjab region. It is very loose at the top but is very tight from the knees to the ankles. However, the style is now more popular in Jammu and Himachal Pradesh as the tight suthan is useful in the hills. When worn by men, the drawers are called ghuttana and when worn by women, the suthan (in a variety of colours). When the tight part of the suthan, up to the knees, has multiple close fitting folds, the suthan is referred to as Dogri pants or Dogri suthan, in Jammu and churidar suthan in Himachal Pradesh. It is also worn in the hilly area of the Punjab region. In Jammu, members of all communities wear the suthan.

The traditional Dogri kurta for men is open at the front and flares out from the waist to the knees. The kurta for women tends to be long and cut straight, a style adopted from neighbouring Punjab, as local culture shares an affinity with the Punjab region, especially the southern area.

== Churidar pajama ==
The churidar pajama, also called churidar suthan, which forms part of the traditional attire of men and women in Punjab is a combination of the tight suthan of the Punjab region and the traditional Dogri loose suthan. Accordingly, the churidar pajama is believed to be derived from the suthan. The Churidar pajama is popular all over the sub-continent and was developed in the Punjab region, and is associated with the Punjab.

== See also ==
- Punjabi clothing
