= Gayen =

Gayen, Gain
- Pronunciation: গায়েন (Ga-en)

Origin
- Meaning: Bard
- Region of origin: Bengal

Gayen, sometimes anglicised as Gain or Gaine, is a Bengali surname found in the Indian subcontinent. It comes from the Sanskrit word for "singer" and historically referred to anyone involved in the medieval bardic tradition, i.e. composition of poetry and music.

== Notable people ==
- Anil Kumar Gain (1919–1978), Cambridge mathematician and founder of Vidyasagar University
- Kaberi Gain (born 1970), author and social activist, researcher at the University of Edinburgh
- Peter Gain (born 1974), former professional footballer who played for Tottenham Hotspur
- Chhanda Gayen (1979–2014), first Bengali woman to climb Mount Everest
- Prasun Gain (born 1977), Indian actor
- Margaret Gayen (born 1994), Indian-Australian long jumper

== In popular culture ==
- Goopy Gayen Bagha Bayen, a classic Bengali film by Satyajit Ray
