= Kothari (temple) =

Adviser in the Swaminarayan Hindu Faith

Kothari, normally an ascetic, is an adviser to the temple in the Swaminarayan Faith of Hinduism. The Kothari is a part of the temple management and is not required to take part in religious activities.
