= Jamawar =

Type of Kashmir shawl

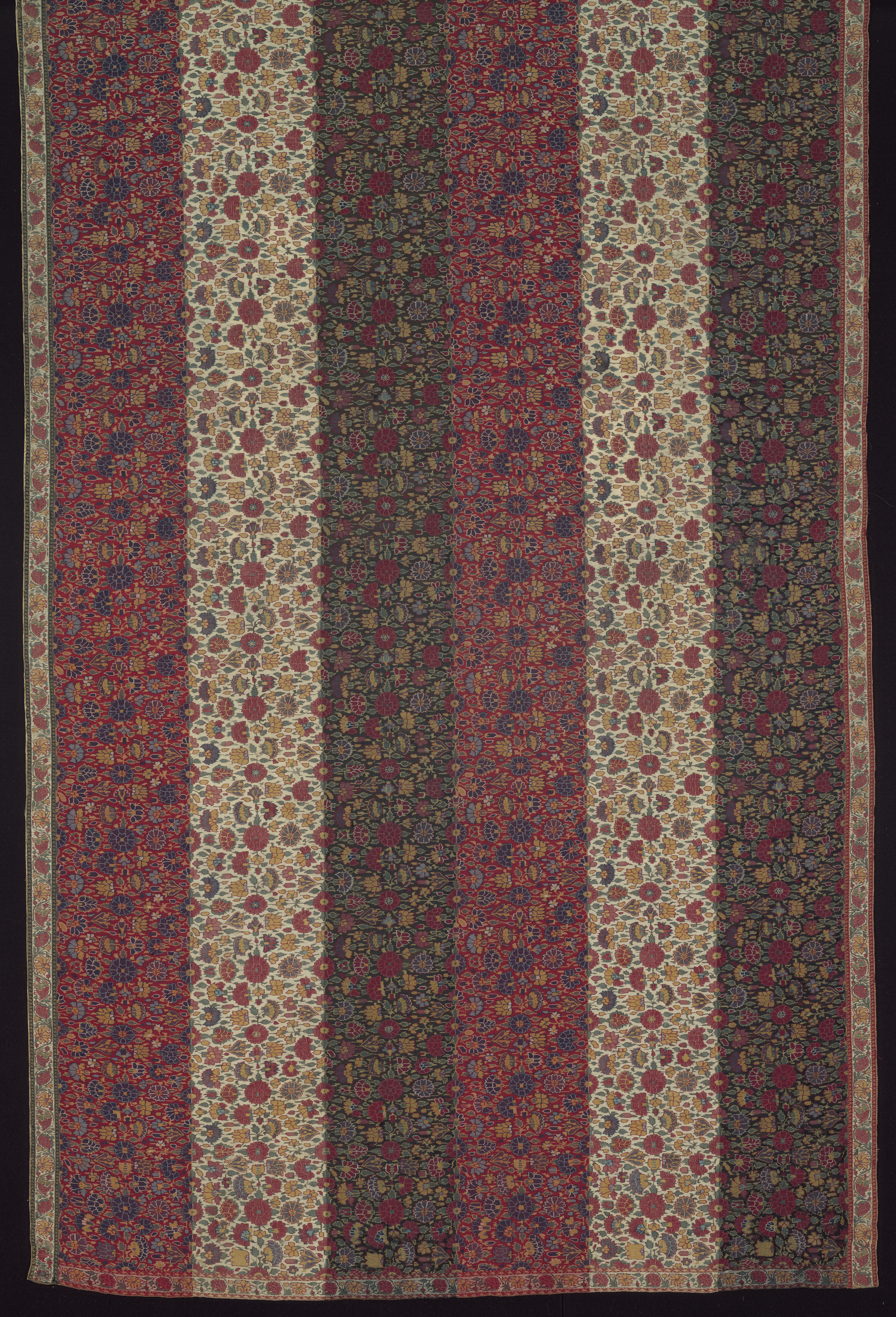
A Jamawar shawl from the Mughal era

Jamawar, or gown piece, is a special type of shawl made in Kashmir. "Jama" means robe and "war/var" is yard. The best quality of Jamawar is built with Pashmina. The brocaded parts are woven in similar threads of silk or polyester. Most of the designs seen today are floral, with the kairy as the predominant motif. Historically handmade items, some shawls took a couple of decades to complete; consequently, original Jamawar shawls are highly valued. Modern, machine-made Jamawar prints, produced in cities such as Kashmir and other parts of Himachal Pradesh cost less to buy but handmade Jamawar are very expensive.

Traders introduced this Chinese silk cloth to India, mainly from Samarkand and Bukhara and it gained immense popularity among the royalty and the aristocracy. Kings and nobles bought the woven fabric by the yard, wearing it as a gown or using it as a wrap or shawl. Jamawar weaving centres in India developed in the holy cities and the trade centres. The most well known Jamawar weaving centre is Kashmir and Punjab in India.

Due to its rich and fine raw materials, the rich and powerful merchants used Jamawar and noblemen of the time, who could not only afford it but could even commission the weavers to make the fabric for them, as in the case of the Mughals. Emperor Akbar was one of its greatest patrons. He brought many weavers from East Turkestan to Kashmir.
