= Panhala =

- city
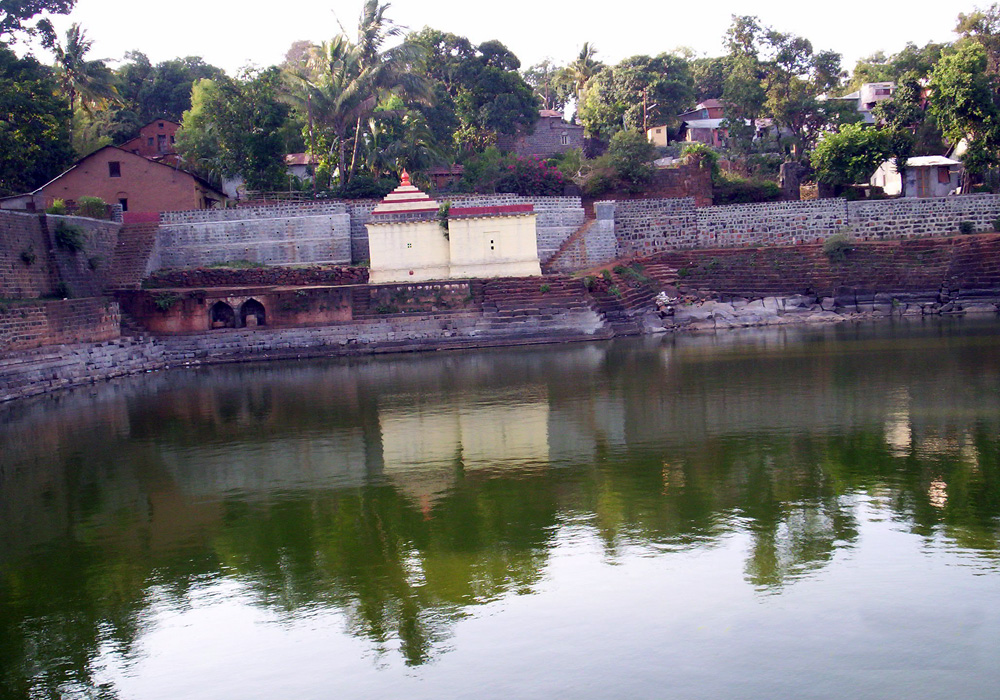
- Panhala water tank

- Location within Maharashtra
- Coordinates: 16.82°N 74.12°E
- Country: India
- State: Maharashtra
- District: Kolhapur
- Elevation: 754 m (2,474 ft)

Population (2001)
  - Total: 3,450

Languages
  - Official: Marathi
- Time zone: UTC+5:30 (IST)
- Postal code: 416201
- Vehicle registration: MH-09

Panhala (Pronunciation: [pənʱaːɭa]) is a city and a Hill station Municipal Council (3177 feet above sea level) 18 km northwest of Kolhapur, in Kolhapur district in the Indian state of Maharashtra. Panhala is the smallest city in Maharashtra and being a Municipal Council the city is developing rapidly. The city sprawls in the Panhala fort commands a panoramic view of the valley below. The main historical attraction here is the Panhala fort. There are many places of interest, each with its share of haunting anecdotes.

== History ==
The history of Panhala is closely linked with the history of the Maratha Empire, and with its founder, Chatrapati (King) Shivaji Raje. Panhala is the only fort where Chhatrapati Shivaji Maharaj spent more than 500 days consecutively, other than his childhood homes. It was Maratha State capital until 1782. In 1827 it became part of the British Empire.

This imposing fort, 20 km northwest of Kolhapur, is built on an outlying spur of the Sahyadris, rising more than 400 m above the plain, and is the largest of all the Deccan forts. The strategic importance of Panhala, guarding one of the principal routes through the Western Ghat, can be judged from its long and varied history. Built between 1178 and 1209, it first served as the headquarters of the Shilahara ruler Bhoja II, and subsequently passed into hands of the Yadavas. It was a favorite outpost of the Bahamanis of Bidar; Mahmud Gawan, the powerful prime minister, encamped here during the rainy season of 1469. By the beginning of the 16th century Panhala was absorbed into the kingdom of Bijapur. The Adil Shahis were responsible for strengthening and rebuilding the ramparts and gateways. The fort was raided by Shivaji in 1659, but it was not until 1673 that he was able to occupy it permanently.

After Sambhaji's death in 1689, it was captured by Aurangzeb. However, it was re-captured in 1692 by Kashi Ranganath Sarpotdar under the guidance of Parshuram Pant Pratinidhi. In 1701, Panhala was finally surrendered to Aurangzeb, and it was here that the Mughal Emperor received the English Ambassador, Sir William Norris. Within a few months, the fort was retaken by the Maratha forces under Pant Amatya Ramachandra. Tarabai who asserted her autonomy by founding an independent dynasty. In 1782, these rulers shifted their headquarters to Kolhapur. After a local rebellion in 1844, Panhala was taken by the British. More than 7 km of fortifications define the approximately triangular zone of Panhala fort. The walls are protected for long sections by steep escarpments, reinforced by a parapet with slit holes. The remaining sections have 5–9 m high ramparts, strengthened by round bastions. Unfortunately, the East Gate called Char Darawaja, through which the road passes on arrival at fort, was demolished by the British.

The fort has another satellite fort visible. It is said that there were wells full with Ghee to cure the soldiers. The well-known poet Moropant stayed here. Nearby are the Sambhaji temple, Someshwar temple, Teen Darwaza, and Raj Dindi, Sajja Kothi, Ambabai Temple, where Shivaji used to seek blessings before venturing on expeditions. Pavankhind, where Baji Prabhu Deshpande laid down his life to cover Shivaji's escape.

=== Parashar caves ===
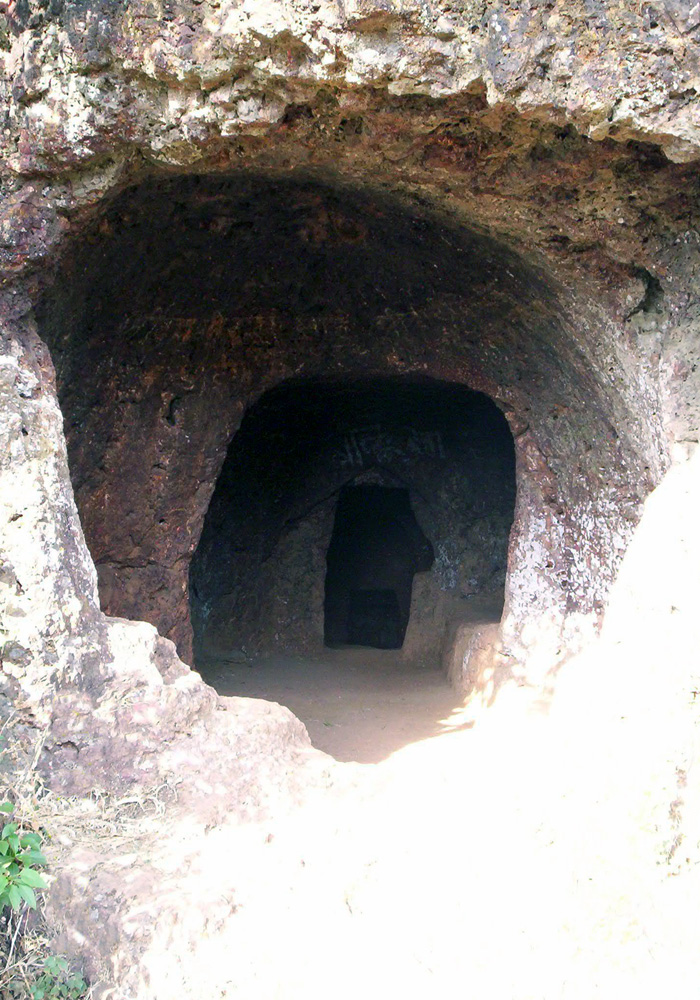
Parashar caves

Panhala was traditionally considered the residence of Maharishi Parashara. The Karvir or Kolhapur Puran, a modern (1730) compilation, mentions Panhala as Pannagalay (home of serpents). In old inscriptions, the name appears as Pranlak and Padmanal. These are supposed to be the caves where the sage Parashar lived. Moropant, an 18th-century Marathi poet, wrote most of his work in these caves. Moropant's birthplace is Panhala. These caves are mentioned in the Karvir Puraan as tirths (holy water).

== Geography ==
Panhala is located at 16°49′12″N 74°7′12″E. It has an average elevation of 754 metres (2473 feet). Panhala is connected via train and bus to Kolhapur and Sangli. Kolhapur is about 21 km away while Sangli is about 60 km. Kolhapur Chhatrapati Shahu Maharaj Train Terminus is just 20 km away. Sangli railway station is 60 km. Buses right from railway station to Panhala fort or you can also hire taxi or auto from Kolhapur to Panhala fort. You can also get plenty of auto rikshaw and taxi from Sangli railway station to Panhala.

== Demographics ==
As of 2001 India census, Panhala had a population of 3450. Males constitute 57% of the population and females 43%. Panhala has an average literacy rate of 83%, higher than the national average of 59.5%: male literacy is 88%, and female literacy is 76%. In Panhala, 10% of the population is under 6 years of age.

== Panhala Arboretum ==
Arboretum Site is R. S. No. 457 & 466 located along famous Teen Darwaja to Mangeshkar bungalow road. Area under plantation is 2.56 hectares. There are more than 3000 individuals of flowering plants. The planted species include trees (158 sps), shrubs (87 sps), grasses (7 sps), Perennial Herbs (19 sps), bamboos (6 sps), orchids (3 sps), palms (5 sps), climbers (33 sps), ferns (6 sps), pines (9 sps), cycads (2 sps). The activity itself is a Unique Activity in Maharashtra and is a joint venture of Panhala Municipal Council, Forest Department and Social Forestry.

== Nearest Cities ==
- Kolhapur - 21 km
- Sangli - 60 km

== Nearby Railway Stations ==
- Chatrapati Shahu Maharaj Terminus Kolhapur - 21 km
- Sangli railway station - 60 km
