= Potdar =

Potdar (Marathi: पोतदार) is a hereditary title and a surname native to the Indian state of Maharashtra. This surname is mainly found among the Panchal Sonar, Deshastha Brahmin and Karhade Brahmin communities. Potdar is part of Maratha revenue system, as well as the local administrative body in the state of Maharashtra.

== Etymology ==
Potdar, derived from Persian Fotdar, literally means "purse bearar" or Treasurer. They were in charge of testing the genuineness weight of minted coins. Along with Kulkarni, Joshi, Gurav, Lohar, Kumbhar, Parit, Nhavi, Sutar, Chambhar, Mahar and Mang, who came from different castes, the Potdar formed a part of Bara Balutedar system.

== Potdar as a title ==
The privilege of Potdari was granted by the Peshwa to a person who could advance a fixed sum of rupees to the government. The Potdar was to examine the coins used in of day-to-day transactions. In exchange for their services, they were granted hereditary rights (Vatan) to a share in the village harvest.

== Notable people ==
- Datto Vaman Potdar - an Indian historian; former Vice-Chancellor of University of Pune.
- Achyut Potdar - an Indian Bollywood actor
