= Churidar =

Trousers worn by men and women in South Asia

Churidars, also churidar pyjamas, are tightly-fitting trousers worn by both men and women on the Indian subcontinent. Churidars are a variant of the common shalwar pants. However, while shalwars are cut wide at the top and narrow at the ankle, churidars narrow much higher on the leg, allowing the contours of the legs to be revealed. In addition, they are usually cut on the bias, imparting a natural stretchiness, an important quality for close-fitting garments.

They are also worn longer than the leg, sometimes being finished with a snug, buttoned cuff at the ankle. The excess length falls into folds and appears like a set of bangles resting on the ankle, from which they get their name ('churidar': "bangle like" in English, from 'churi': bangle, 'dar': like). When the wearer is sitting, the extra material is the "ease" that makes it possible to bend the legs and sit comfortably. The word churidar is from Hindi and made its way into English only in the 20th century. Earlier, tight-fitting churidar-like pants worn in India were referred to by the British as Moghul breeches, long-drawers or mosquito drawers.

Churidars are usually worn with a kameez (tunic) by women or a kurta (a loose overshirt) by men, or they can form part of a bodice and skirt. Churidaar predecessors can be even traced back to the Gupta period or Chola period as many photos show us women wearing leggings that roll at the bottom. A similar style existed in India called the suthan.

== Image gallery ==
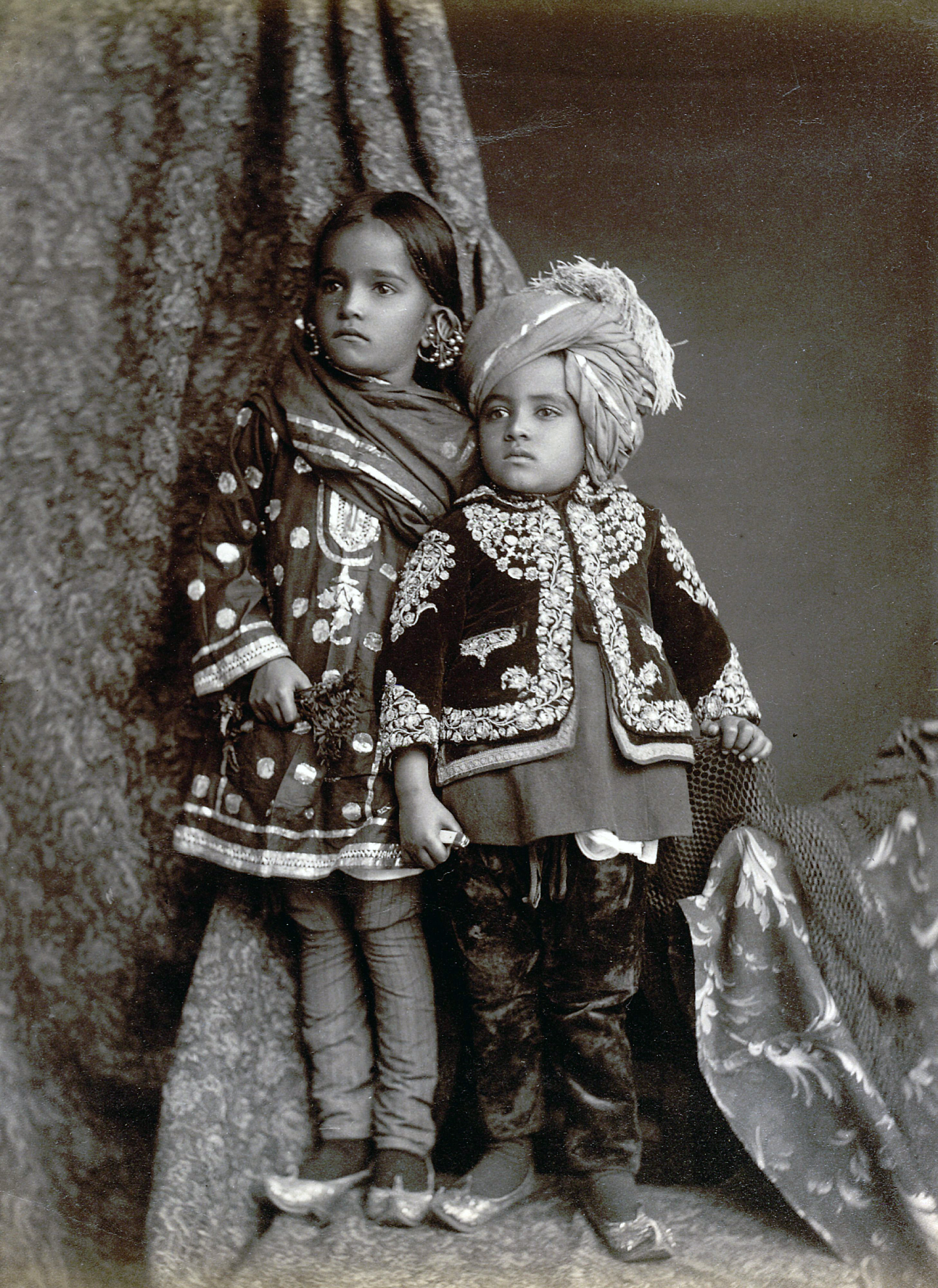
Portrait of Kashmiri children wearing churidar pyjamas, c. 1890

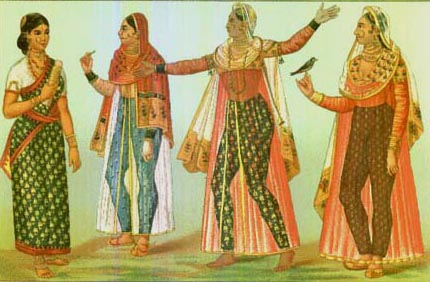
19th century painting of Indian women wearing transparent skirts over churidar pants

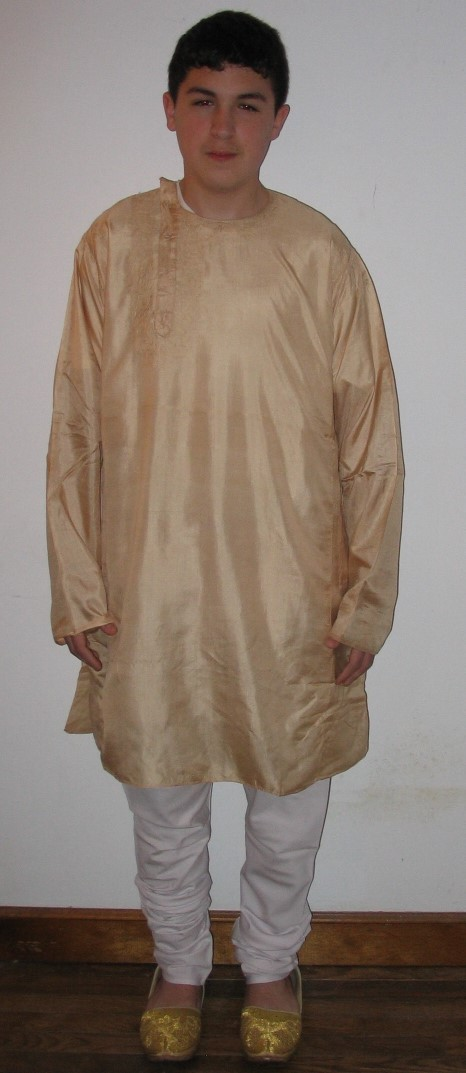
Cotton churidar worn with silk side-opening kurta and mojari shoes

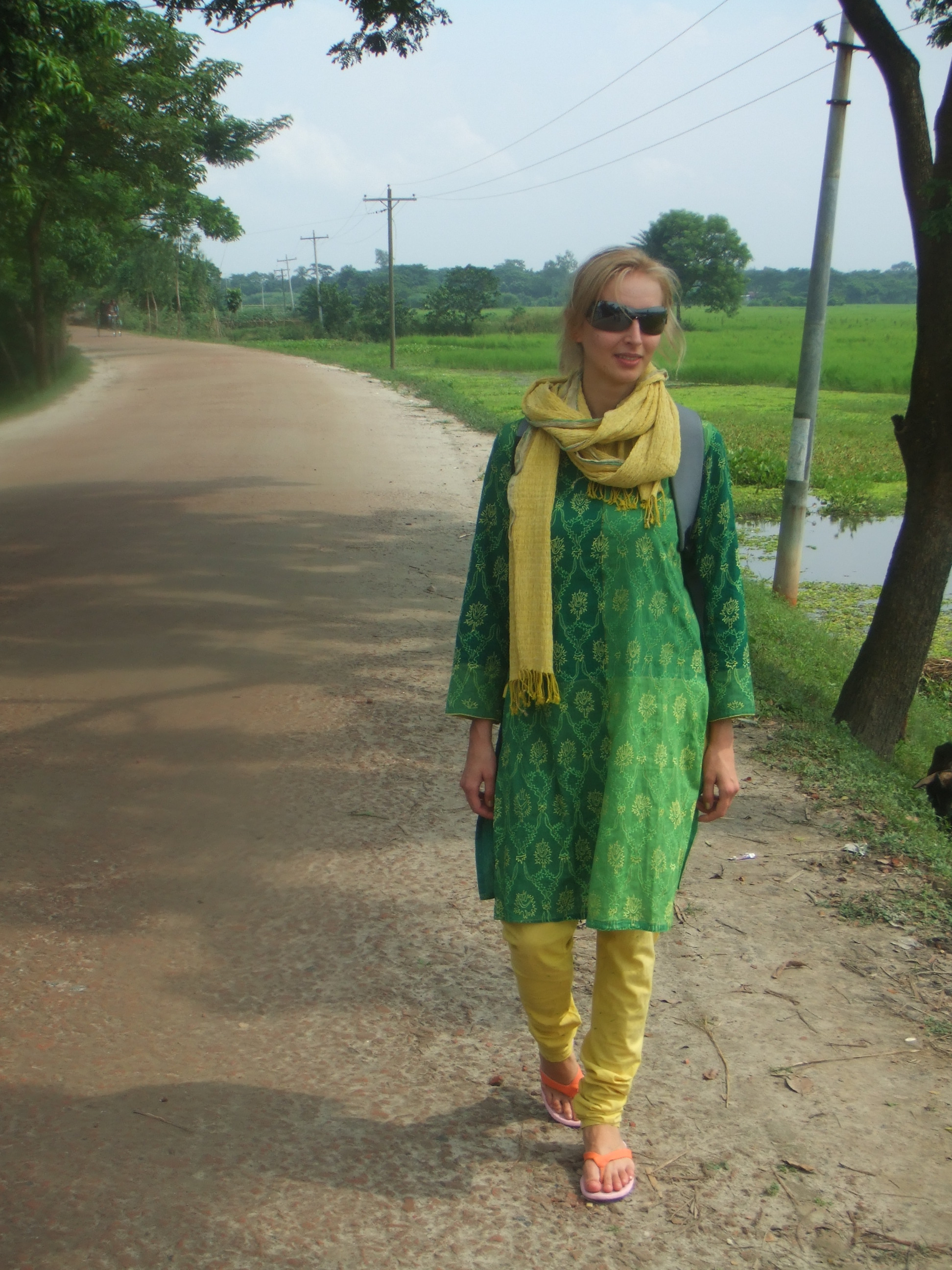
Woman visiting Bangladesh wearing a churidar

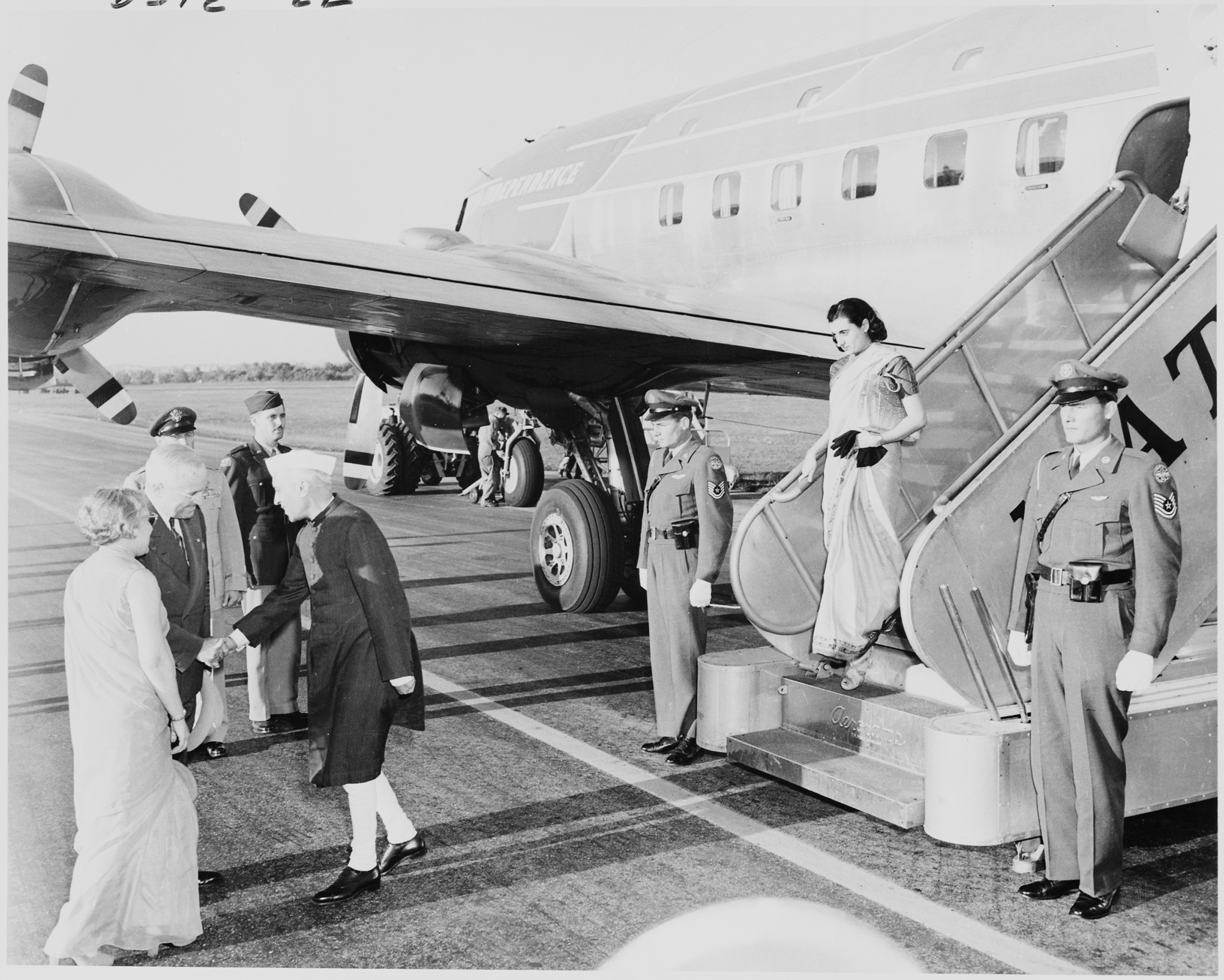
Jawaharlal Nehru, dressed in churidar, being received by U.S. president Truman in Washington D.C. (October 1949)

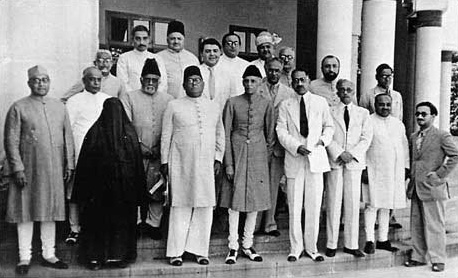
Muhammad Ali Jinnah (center) and Liaquat Ali Khan (far left), both in churidars at the All-India Muslim League Working Committee meeting (March 1940)

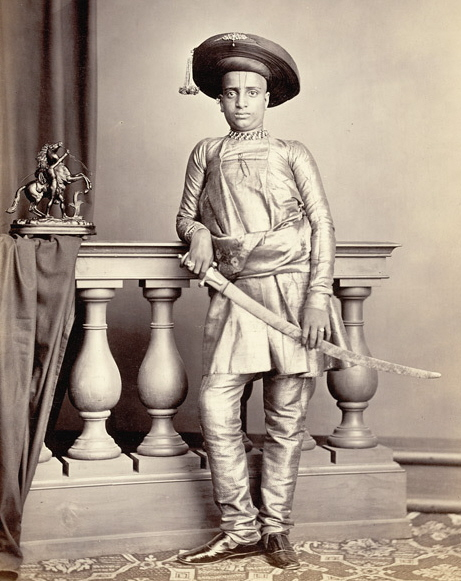
Portrait of the son of H.H. Chunnasee Rajoonath Pant, wearing churidars (1860)

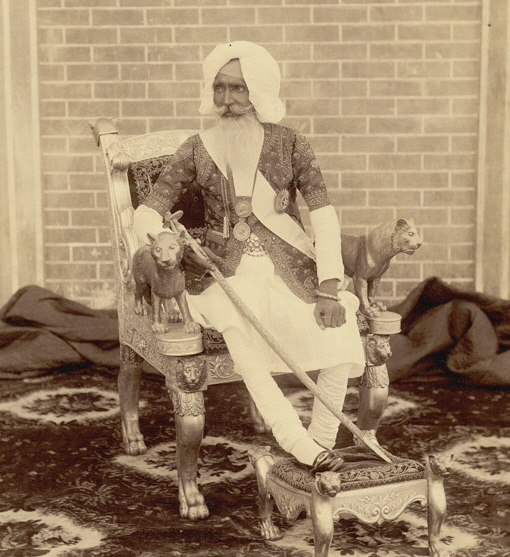
Portrait of Sir Hira Singh in churidars, c. 1890

== See also ==
- Leggings
- Shalwar kameez
- Slim-fit pants
