= Fursat =

Fursat or fursat may refer to:

- "Fursat" (song), 2016 song by Arjun Kanungo
- "Fursat Hai Aaj Bhi", 2020 song by Arjun Kanungo
- Fursat (film), a 2023 short film by Vishal Bhardwaj
- Fursat (soundtrack), a 2023 soundtrack by Vishal Bhardwaj
- Fursatganj Airfield, an airfield in Amethi district
