= Langa voni =

Traditional South Asian dress

A langa voni (also called "pavadai daavani" in Tamil or "laṅga davaṇi" in Kannada) is a traditional dress worn in South India by girls between puberty and marriage. It is also known as the two-piece sari or half sari. Girls younger than this may wear it on special occasions.

It comprises a langa or paavadai, a skirt which is tied around the waist using string, and a voni, oni, or daavani, which is a cloth usually 2 to 2.5 metres (6 ft 7 in to 8 ft 2 in) in length. The voni is draped diagonally over a choli (a tight fitting blouse, the same as that worn with a sari). Usually, the garment is woven with cotton or silk. A variant of this is the ghagra choli of North India (the difference between the two being the direction of draping the voni or dupatta). The modern day "lehenga-style sari", worn by Indians across the subcontinent mainly for special occasions, is inspired by the langa voni.

== Dress ==
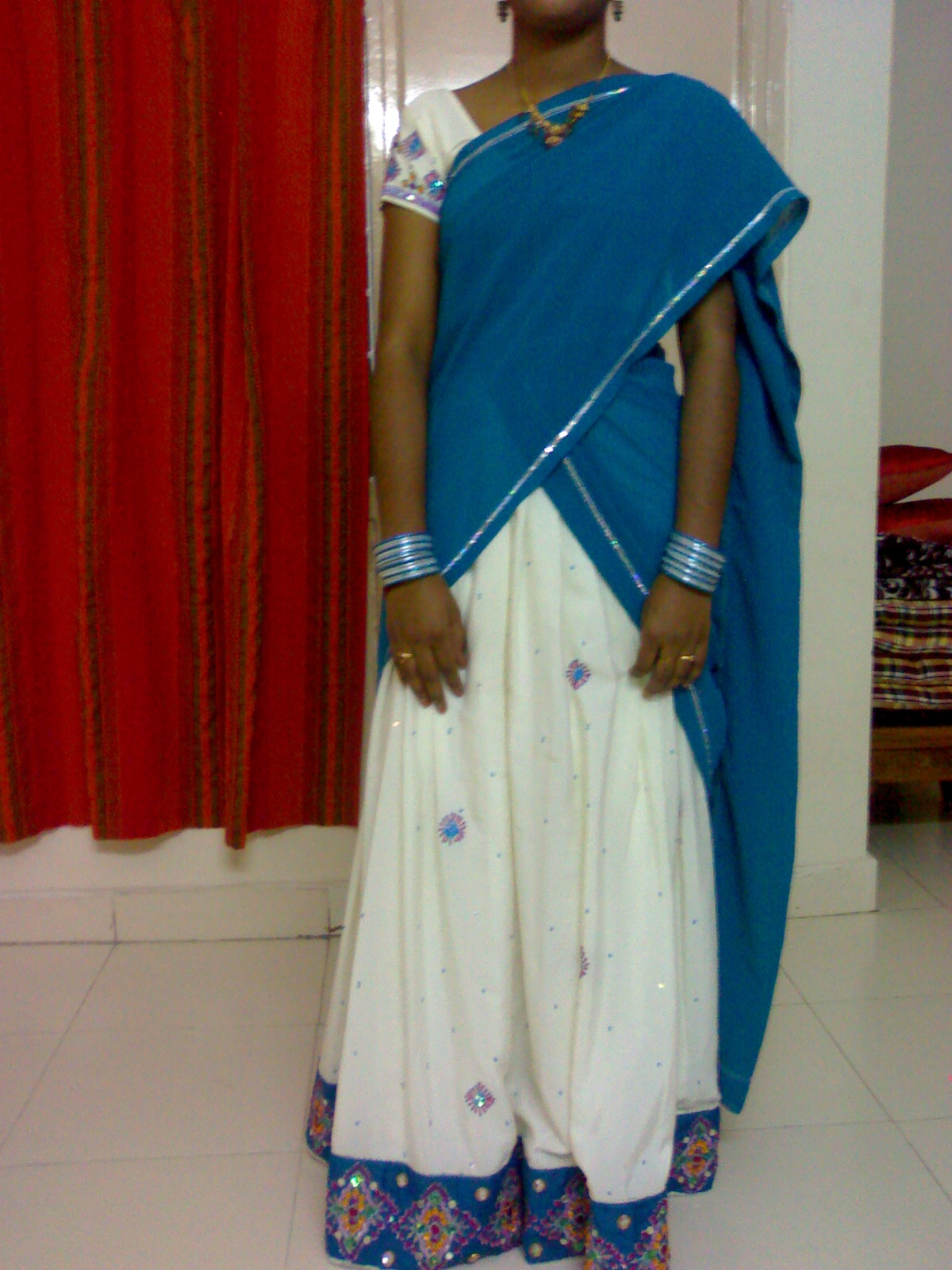
A woman wearing langa voni

The half sari facilitates the transition from the childhood paavadai (skirt) sattai (blouse) to the sari, the more complicated drape worn by adult women. Usually the langa (paavadai) and voni are brightly colored and contrasting to each other. At a glance, the half sari outfit can look similar to southern styles of sari because the drape travels in the same direction: tucked into the front of the skirt, then wrapped around the waist, and then draped over the opposite shoulder. However, the voni is shorter, and the wearer is not required to manually pleat the cloth, as is done when draping the sari. In addition, the voni is less restrictive, allowing the wearer to move her legs freely.

== Modern day ==
The influence of western culture and the perception of the dress as inconvenient has led to the decline of the half sari as daily wear, in favor of the shalwar kameez or Western clothes. However, the langa voni has inspired the modern day "lengha-style sari" and has seen a comeback.

In recent years, however, the langa voni is gaining popularity among girls and young women as occasional wear due to attention in media and fashion. Once very simple, they can now be seen with extravagant embroidery, mirror or zari work, and bold colors like black and grey which were once considered inauspicious. There is also a greater diversity of fabrics being used in addition to the usual silk or cotton, including chiffon, georgette, crepe and nylon. Full saris are sometimes woven so that the fabric, when worn, changes color or pattern at the hip, in order to give the visual effect of a langa voni.

== Significance in coming of age ceremony ==
In South India, coming of age ceremonies or rites of passage (Telugu: లంగా వోణి, romanized: langa voni; Tamil: பட்டு பாவாடை, romanized: pattu pavadai; Kannada: ಲಂಗ ದಾವಣಿ, romanized: langa davani) are celebrated when a girl reaches puberty. She wears a langa voni given by her maternal grandparents, which is worn during the first part of the ceremony and then she is given her first sari by her paternal grandparents, which she wears during the second half of the ceremony. This marks her transition into womanhood.

The tradition of presenting a langa voni from the maternal grandparents in some communities begins with the girl's first naming ceremony (namakaran) and her first rice-feeding ceremony (annaprashana). She receives her last one at her coming of age ceremony.

== Gallery ==
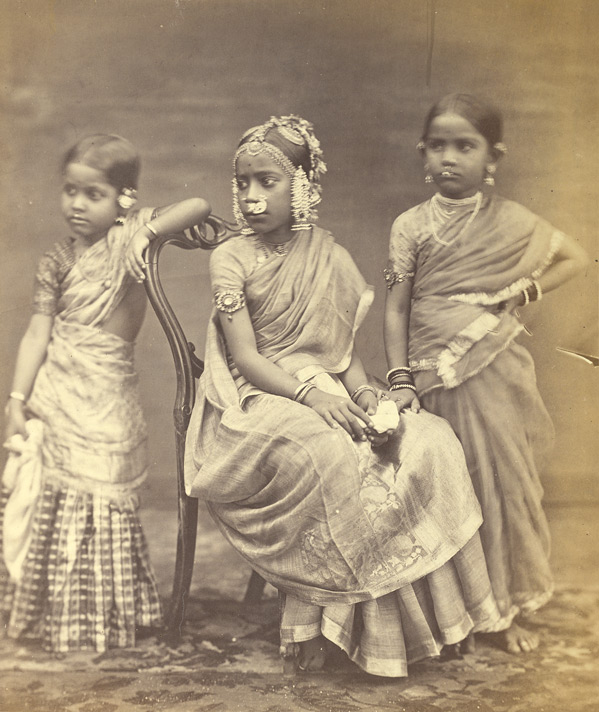
The girl on the left is wearing the langa voni. The other two are wearing saris. The jewelled head-dress of the girl in the center is traditionally worn at marriage ceremonies or at rite-of-passage ceremonies performed when a girl reaches puberty. Tamil Nadu, c. 1870.

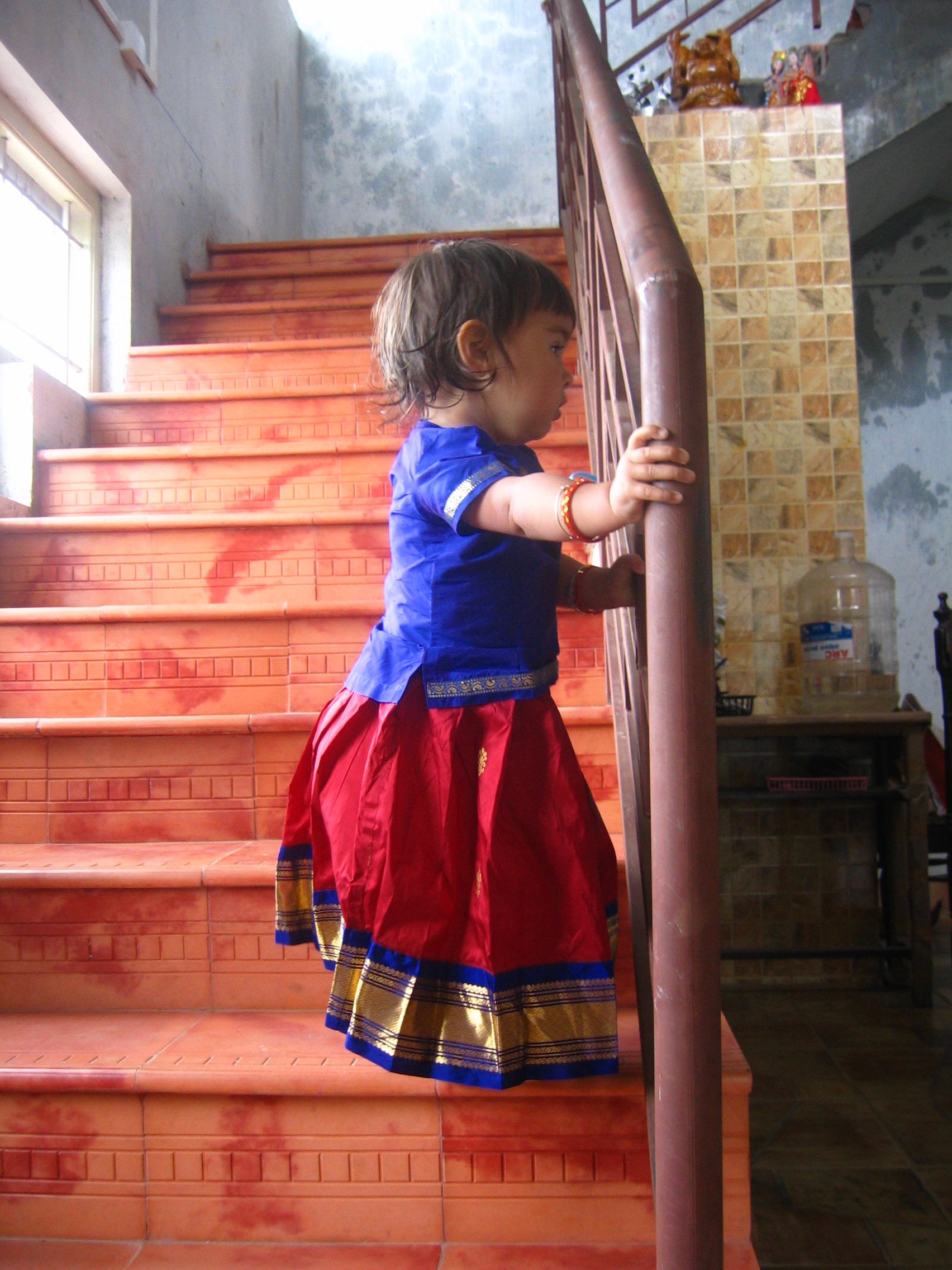
Girl dressed in langa and ravike, or pavadai sattai

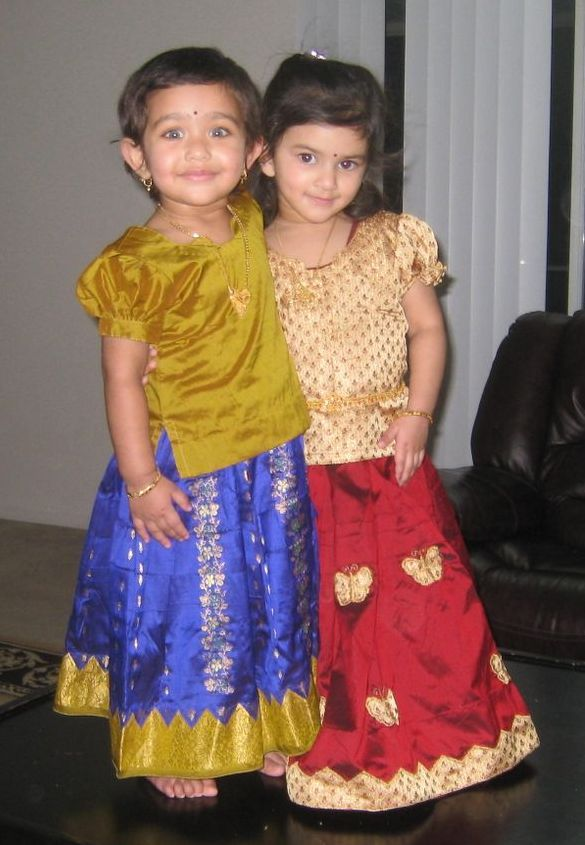
Girls dressed in langa and ravike

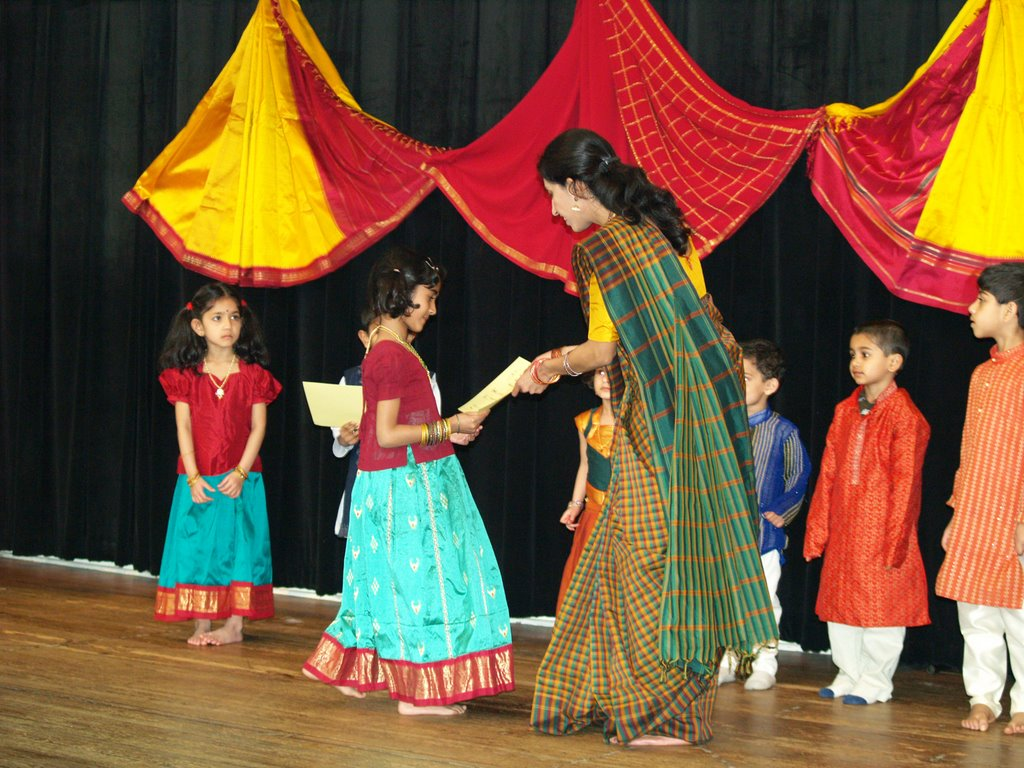
Schoolgirls dressed in langa and ravike for Ugadi. The woman is wearing a sari. The boys are wearing the kurta.

== See also ==
- Ritu Kala Samskaram
- Ghagra choli
