= Ritu Kala Samskaram =

Hindu rite of passage for young female

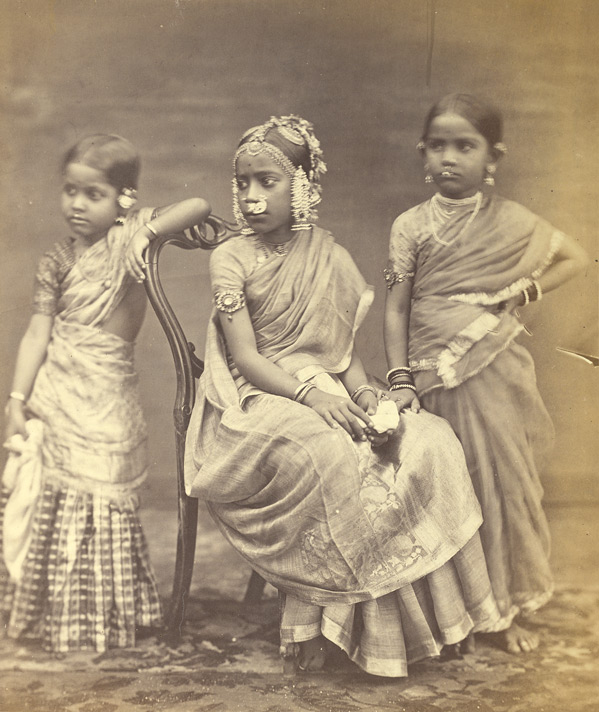
A Tamil Hindu girl (center) in 1870 wearing a half-sari, flowers and jewelry of her Ritu Kala Sanskara rite of passage.

Ritu Kala Samskaram, or Ritushuddhi, is a female coming-of-age ritual in South Indian Hindu traditions. The ritual is performed when a girl wears a langa voni for the first time. The event is also known as Langa Voni (Telugu: లంగా ఓణి), Pavadai Dhavani (Tamil: பாவாடை தாவணி), and Langa Davani (Kannada: ಲಂಗ ದಾವಣಿ). It is also referred to as a Half-sari function.

The ritushuddhi marks a transition out of childhood.

== Ritual ==
The ritu kala samskaram is a rite of passage for women. The ceremony, which is customary in South India, occurs after menarche.

This milestone is observed by family and friends with gifts. It normally takes place at the girl's home. She receives half-saris, which she wears until she is married, when she wears a full sari.

During the first part of the ceremony, the girl wears a langa voni, or half sari. Her maternal uncle then gifts her first sari, which she wears during the second half of the ceremony. This marks her transition into womanhood. The tradition of presenting a langa voni begins with the girl's namakaran, or naming ceremony, and her annaprashana, or first rice-feeding ceremony. She receives her final langa voni at the ritu kala samskaram.

== Related traditions ==
Tuloni biya (transl. small wedding), also referred to as Xoru Biya, Nua-tuloni, and Santi Biya, is a traditional Assamese Hindu ceremony that marks the attainment of puberty in girls and celebrates the girl's transition from childhood to womanhood.

== See also ==
- Culture and menstruation
- Langa voni
- Saṃskāra
- Bar and Bat Mitzvah
