= Lehenga =

Long, embroidered, pleated skirt of the Indian subcontinent

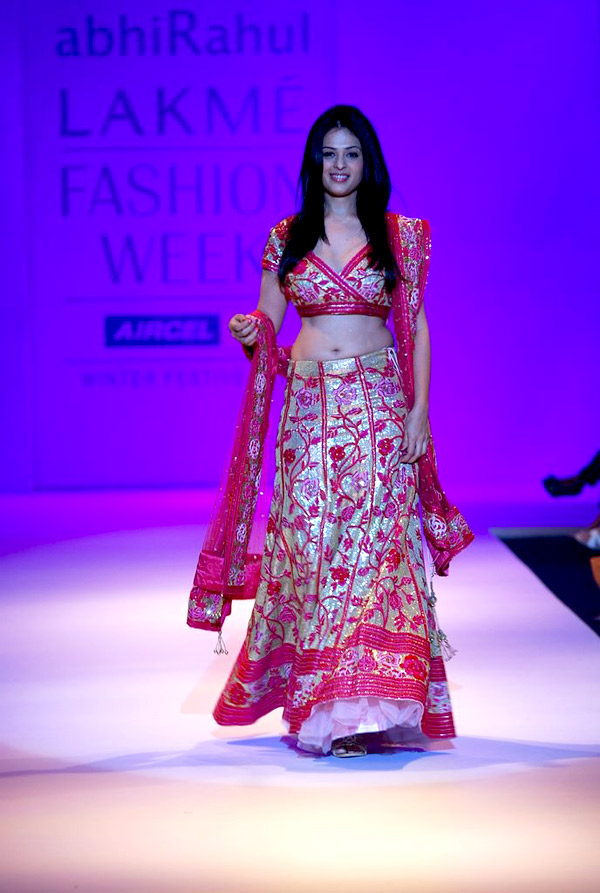
Indian actress Anjana Sukhani wears a bridal lehenga with gota patti embroidery, which is used extensively in weddings across the Indian subcontinent.

The lehenga, lehnga or langa (also known as a ghagra, chaniyo, paro, paavada, or lacha) is a form of ankle-length skirt from the Indian subcontinent. Different patterns and styles of traditional embroidery are used to decorate lehenga. Gota patti embroidery is often used for festivals and weddings. The lehenga is worn as the lower portion of a ghagra choli or langa voni. Ghagra is also used to refer to the half slip or petticoat, a skirt worn as an undergarment below the sari.

The lehenga is a traditional Indian garment that became especially popular in 16th-century northern India.

== Variations ==
=== Ghagri ===
The ghagri is a six-foot-long narrow skirt, the same length as the original antariya. This style of lehenga is still used today, and is worn by Jain nuns in India.

=== A-line ===
The A-line lehenga has an A-line skirt and hem and is named for its shape, which resembles the capital letter "A." The skirt is tighter at the waist and flares out at the bottom.

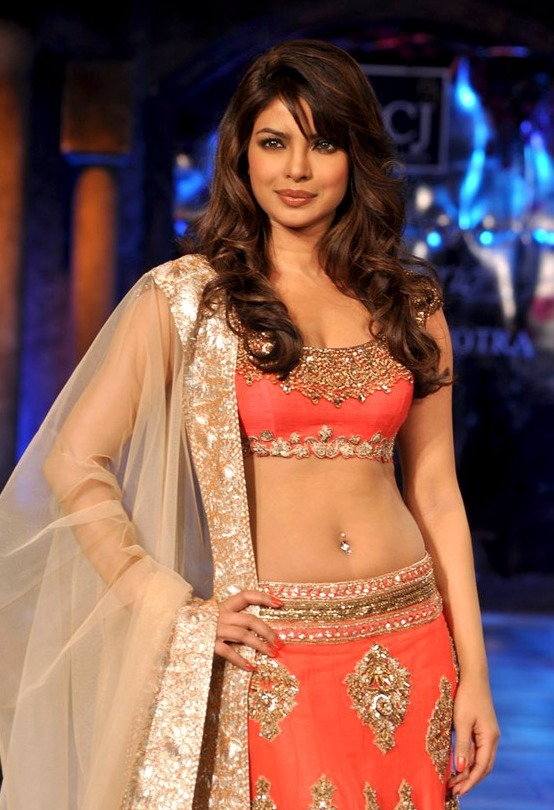
Priyanka Chopra in an A-line lehenga

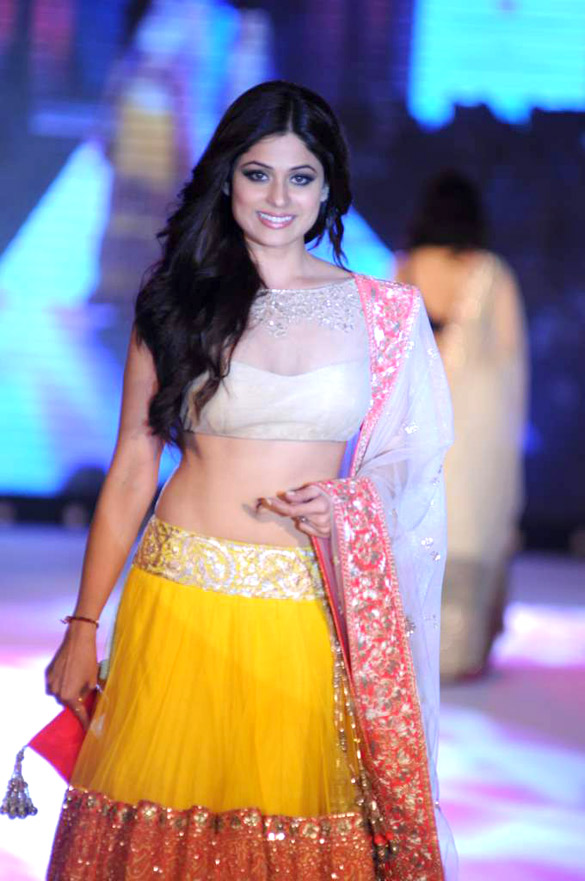
Shamita Shetty in an A-line lehenga

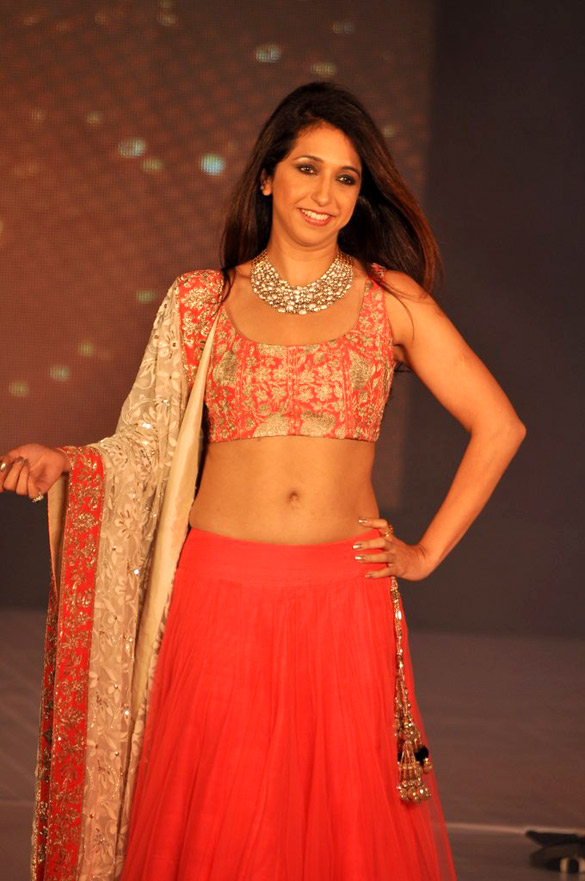
Krishika Lulla in an A-line lehenga at Manish Malhotra's fashion walk

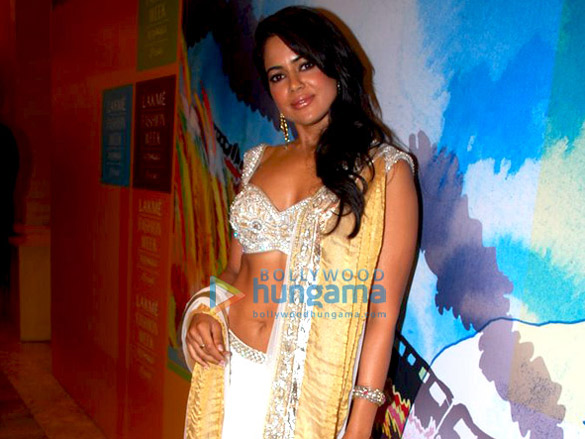
Sameera Reddy in an A-line lehenga

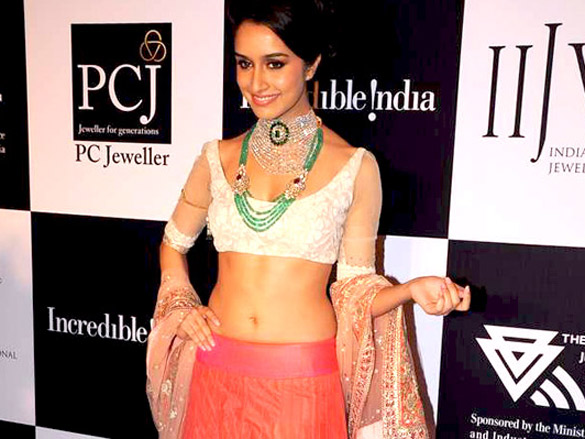
Shraddha Kapoor in an A-line lehenga

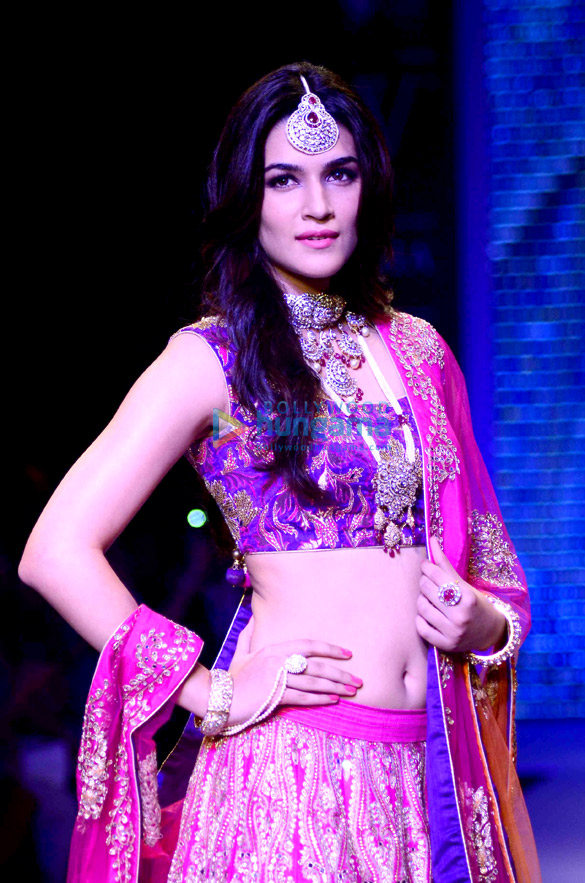
Kriti Sanon in an A-line lehenga

=== Flared ===
A flared or circular lehenga has a round skirt which can be pleated or layered for volume.

==== Double-flared ====
A double-flared lehenga is a type of multi-layered can-can skirt with a dramatic flare and extra volume.

=== Mermaid ===
A mermaid lehenga, also known as a fishtail or trumpet, resembles the tail of a fish. This style is fitted from the waist to the knees, then flares over the calves.

=== Paneled ===
A paneled lehenga has several horizontal panels of fabric stitched together to create a flare, resulting in a fuller skirt. The horizontal panels can be of the same or varying sizes and shapes.

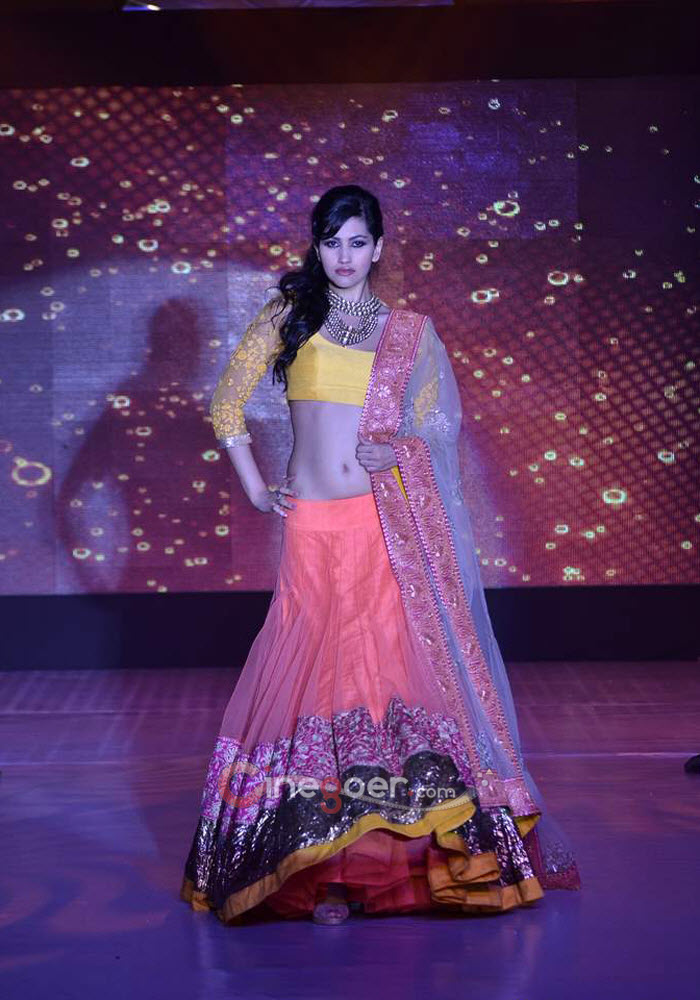
Anjali Lavania in a paneled lehenga

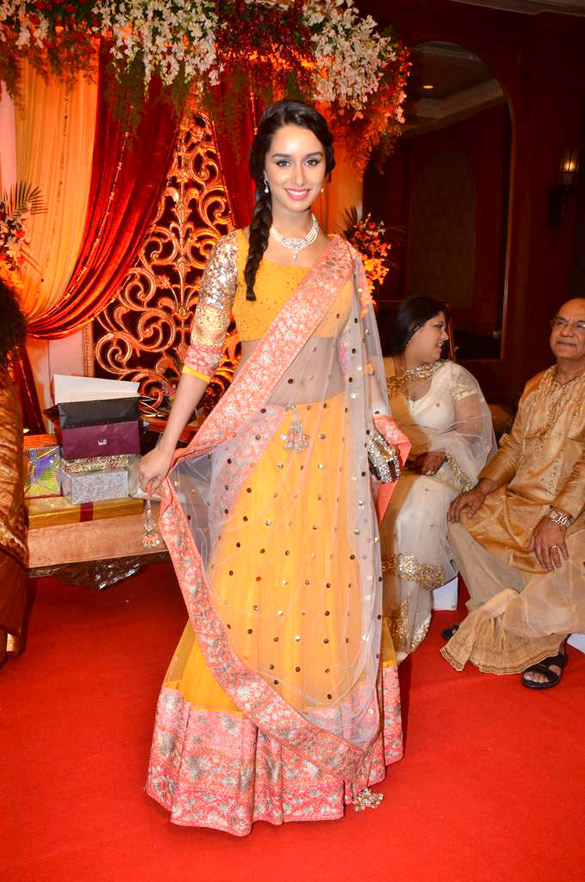
Shraddha Kapoor in a paneled lehenga

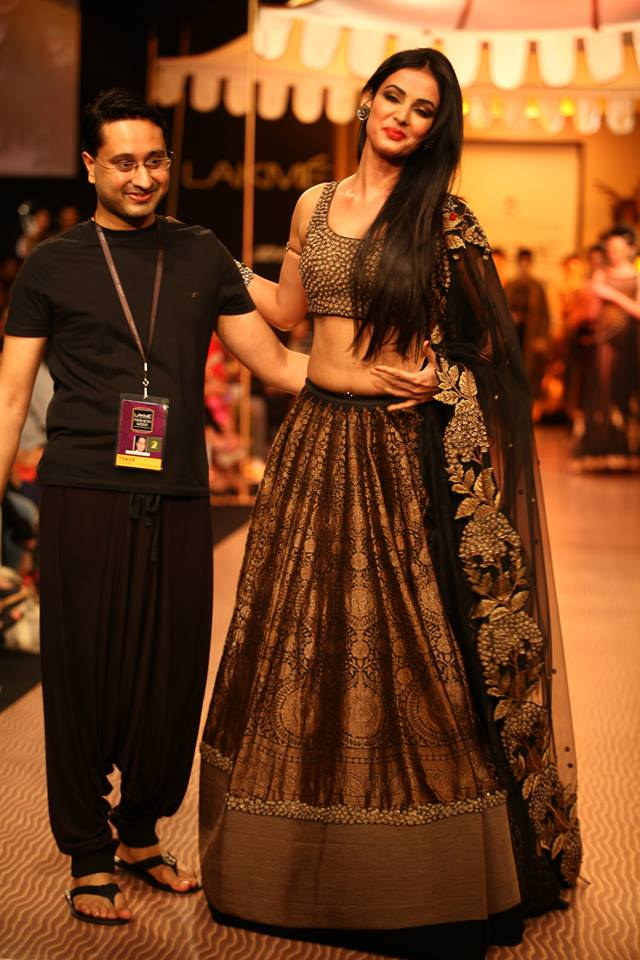
Sonal Chauhan in a paneled lehenga with Shantanu Goenka at Lakme Fashion Week

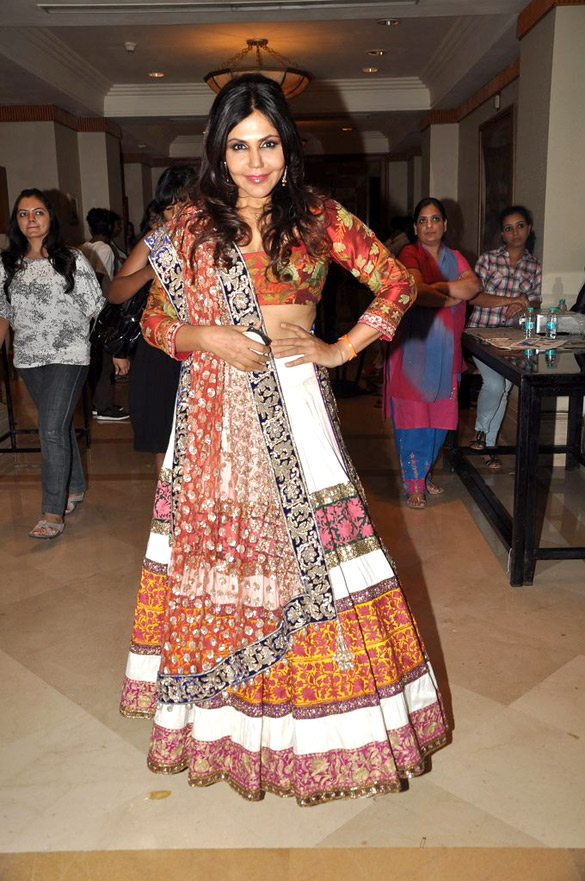

=== Sharara ===
A sharara lehenga is also known as a pavadai, langa davani, langa voni, or half saree. It features large, voluminous pants called palazzos. In Andhra Pradesh and Karnataka it is part of the langa voni. It is typically worn in South India with a dupatta wrapped around the waist and draped across the shoulder like a sari.

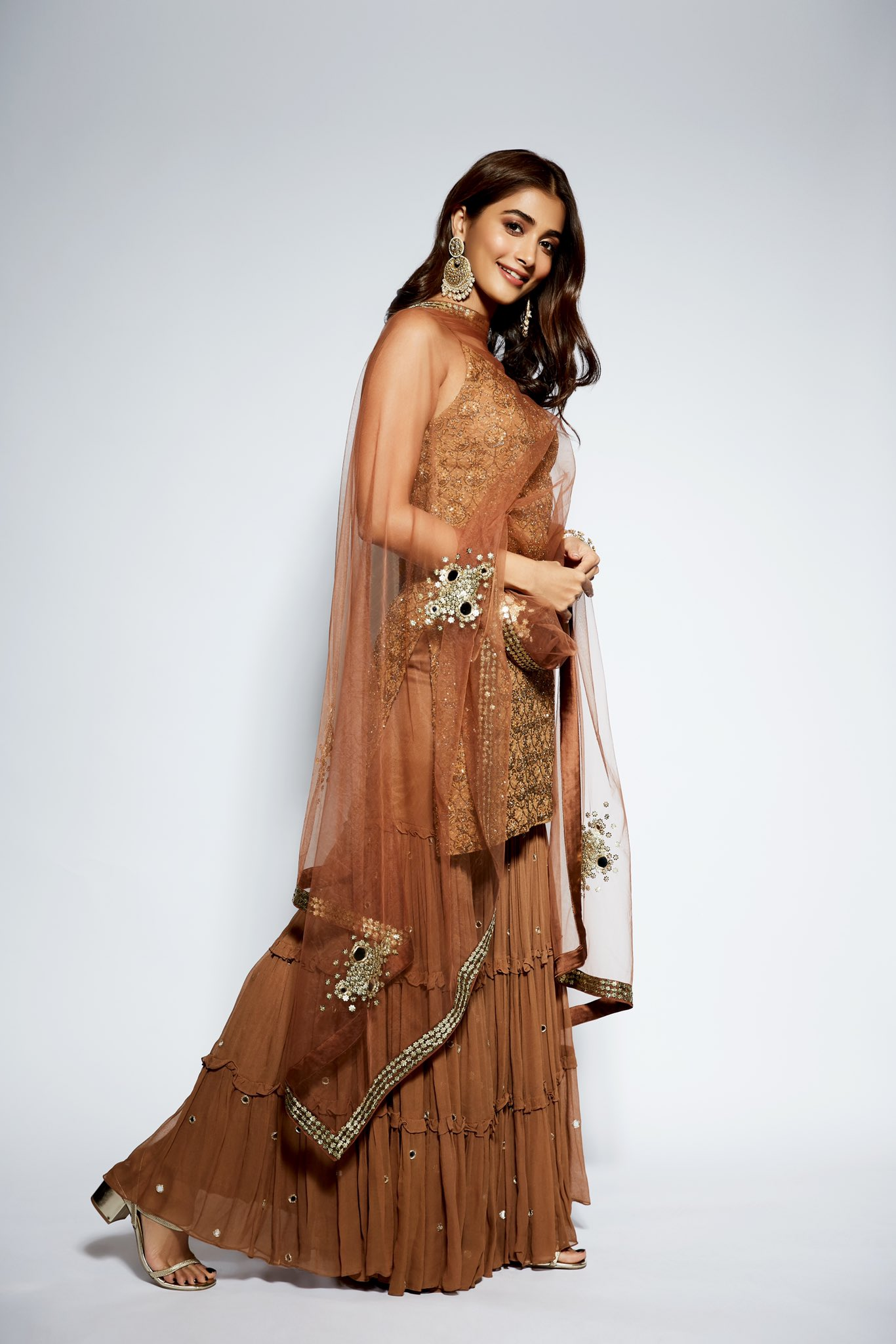
Pooja Hegde in a sharara

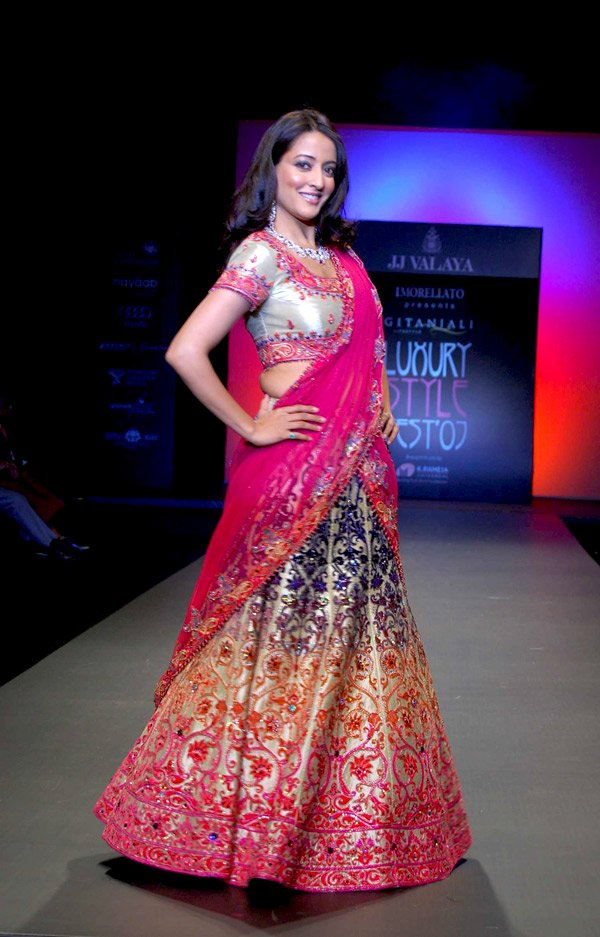
Raima Sen in a sharara

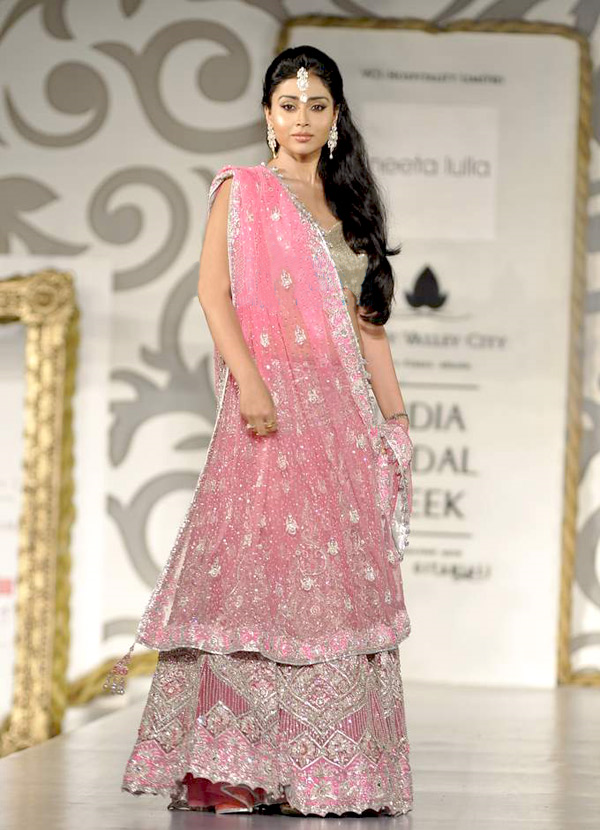
Shriya Saran in a half saree lehenga

=== Straight ===
A straight lehenga has a straight silhouette without any pleats or layers, sometimes with a side slit for easy movement. This style is worn on special occasions.

=== Trail ===
A trail lehenga has an extra portion of fabric attached to the back of the skirt to create a train.

== See also ==
- Lehenga-style sari
- Lehenga of Radhika Merchant
- Gharara
- Sari
- Shalwar kameez
- Kurta
- Dhoti
- Kaupinam
- Punjabi ghagra suit
