= Fursat (song) =

Single by Arjun Kanungo

Single by Arjun Kanungo

from the album Arjun Kanungo - The Rising Star - EP
- Language: Hindi
- Released: 7 April 2016
- Genre: Indian pop
- Length: 4:56
- Label: Sony Music India
- Composers: Arjun Kanungo, Ludwig Lindell, Ylva Dimberg
- Lyricist: Mayur Puri

Music video
- "Fursat" on YouTube

Fursat is a Hindi song released in 2016, with lyrics by Mayur Puri and sung by Arjun Kanungo. The video, featuring Sonal Chauhan and Arjun Kanungo, was directed by Vivek Chauhan.

== Reception ==
It received more than 10 million views on YouTube.

== Fursat Hai Aaj Bhi ==
"Fursat Hai Aaj Bhi"

Single by Arjun Kanungo
- Language: Hindi
- Released: 25 June 2020
- Genre: Indian pop
- Length: 3:43
- Label: VYRLOriginals
- Composer: Arjun Kanungo
- Lyricist: Mayur Puri

Music video
- "Fursat Hai Aaj Bhi" on YouTube

Fursat Hai Aaj Bhi is a 2020 Hindi song written by Mayur Puri and sung by Arjun Kanungo. The song is sequel to Fursat which was released in 2016. Filming took place during COVID-19 pandemic, shot on iPhone. The video of the song is directed by Keyur Shah and it features Arjun Kanungo and Sonal Chauhan in the music video.
