= Arjun Kanungo =

Indian singer, actor, composer and entrepreneur (born 1990)

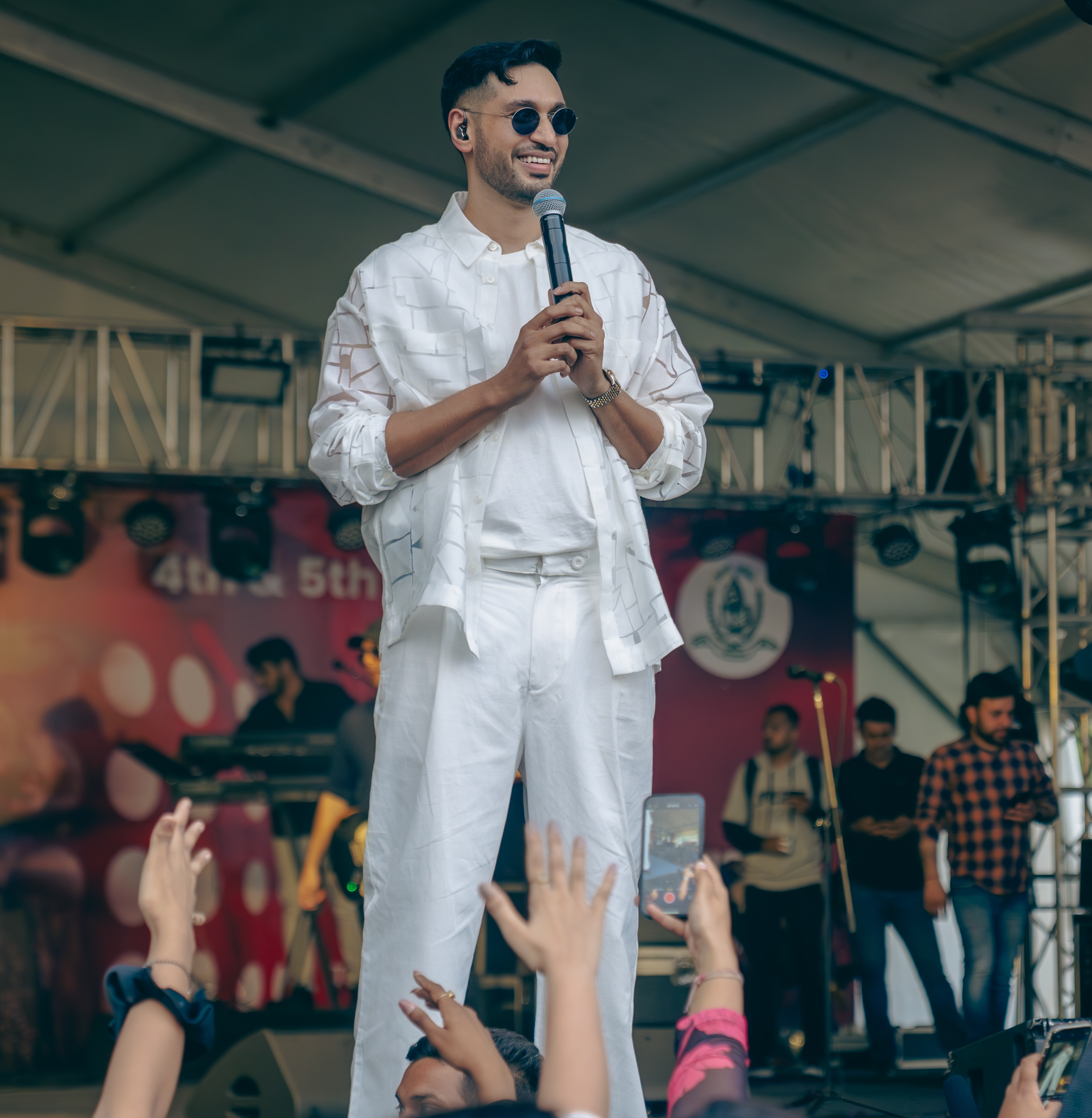
- Kanungo performing at Delhi University.

Background information
- Born: 6 September 1990 (age 36); Mumbai, Maharashtra, India
- Origin: Mumbai, India
- Genres: Pop; rock; dance
- Occupations: Singer; actor; composer; entrepreneur
- Instruments: Vocals; guitar; piano
- Years active: 2013–present
- Labels: Sony Music India, VYRL Originals, Universal Music India, Desi Music Factory
- Spouse: Carla Dennis

Arjun Kanungo (born 6 September 1990) is an Indian singer and music composer, recording artist, music producer, and entrepreneur from Mumbai.

Kanungo began his career at the age of 17, initially working on building recording studios and developing his skills as a recording engineer and music producer. He later performed as a touring singer and guitarist for Asha Bhosle. His breakthrough came in 2015 with the release of "Baaki Baatein Peene Baad," with rapper Badshah, which gained popularity and marked a turning point in his career.

Following his breakout success, Kanungo released several successful tracks, including "Fursat," "Aaya Na Tu", "La La La," with Neha Kakkar, "Sirrikadhey," with Anirudh Ravichander and "Ilzaam" with rapper King. "Ek Dafaa (Chinamma)" peaked at number 33 on the UK Album Download Chart. "La La La" with Neha Kakkar also peaked at 33 on the UK Album Download Chart. "Aaya Na Tu" crossed 100 million views on YouTube in July 2021.

Kanungo's music has accumulated 100s of millions of streams on digital platforms, and has had a notable impact on pop culture through his blend of urban production, contemporary melodies and emotive lyrics.

In addition to his music career, Kanungo founded One Mind Music, an independent music label in India. In 2024, he expanded the label to Japan with One Mind Music Japan, focusing on producing music for the Japanese and South-Asian markets. The label launched its operations with a collaboration between Kanungo and Japanese pop vocalist Ren, on the single "Tell Me", a J-pop ballad sung in Japanese and English. Kanungo continues to create and perform music in multiple languages and is currently learning Japanese.

== Early life ==
Kanungo was born and raised in Mumbai. His mother, a pistol shooter by profession, trained Kanungo in the sport where he won multiple medals at the national level. He also played Basketball for his college and his state team of Maharashtra.

He went on to major in Journalism and Mass communication at R.D. National College, Mumbai.

He is a trained Indian classical singer and plays the piano and guitar.

He is a qualified trained method actor from Lee Strasberg Theatre and Film Institute in New York City.

== Career ==
At the age of 18, Kanungo opened a recording studio in Mumbai called Promethean Audio.

Kanungo's first commercial success came with "Khoon Choos Le" in the 2013 film Go Goa Gone, starring Saif Ali Khan.

His debut single 'Baaki Baatein Peene Baad' was released on 25 September 2015 by Sony Music India. The song was written by Mayur Puri and was composed, written, recorded and produced in Sweden. The song also features Badshah.

Since then he has had Several hit songs - Fursat, Ek Dafaa (Chinnama), La La la with Neha Kakkar, Tang Mujhko, Zara Zara, Sirrikadhey and Ilzaam, to name a few. Arjun has lent his voice to several Bollywood films. His Tamil Debut came with 'Sirrikadhey', composed by Anirudh Ravichander, from the film 'Remo'.

In 2022, Kanungo released his first studio album titled 'Industry' on June 16, 2022. The album currently has over 250 millions streams across platforms. The album also featured rapper King, American singer songwriter Vaultboy, Rashmeet Kaur and Yash Vaid. Kanungo promoted the album via an India tour labelled the 'We are Industry' tour which went to 11 cities in India.

In 2023, Kanungo released a follow up album titled 'Industry 2'. The first single from the album released on 5 July 2023. Kanungo attributed not doing a tour for the album to a hip fracture which he experienced on a trip the Maldives with his wife.

He made his debut in Bollywood alongside Salman Khan in Radhe (2021 film) where he played the role of 'Mansoor', a drug dealer. He also played an extended cameo role in Mahesh Bhatt's 'Jalebi' where he played himself.

In June 2025, Kanungo released the J-pop single "Ai No Imi" with MINA through One Mind Music. Later that year, he composed the original soundtrack for the web series Ekaki created by Ashish Chanchlani. In January 2026, The Hello Group India announced that it had signed Kanungo for worldwide exclusive management and bookings.

== Acting Filmography ==
=== Films ===
Year	Title	Role	Notes	Ref.
2018	Jalebi (film)	Himself	Extended Cameo Appearance	
2018	Side-hero (OTT)	Ranjit	Lead	
2021	Radhe (film)	Mansoor	Film Acting debut	

== Discography ==
=== As a Playback Singer ===
Year	Song	Also featuring	Movie	Music	Writer	Label
2013	Khoon Choos Le	Suraj Jagan, Priya Saraiya	Go Goa Gone	Sachin–Jigar	Priya Saraiya	Sony Music
2013	Learn To Adjust	Asha Bhosle	Mai	Nitin Shankar		
2014	Tum Chal Diye		Pizza	Saurabh Kalsi		Times Music
2015	Jahan Tum Ho	Shalmali Kholgade	Prasad Ruparel	Prasad Ruparel		
2016	Sirikkadhey	Srinidhi Venkatesh	Remo	Anirudh Ravichander		Sony Music
2019	House Party Song	Sukhwinder Singh, Parry G	Ek Ladki Ko Dekha Toh Aisa Laga	Rochak Kohli	Gurpreet Saini	Zee Music
2019	Nadaaniyaan	Lisa Mishra	The Sky Is Pink	Pritam	Pritam	Zee Music
2022	Joshuga Hasharuga		Joshuga Hasharuga (film)	Praneeth Music		Aditya Music

=== Singles and Albums - As lead artist ===
Year	Song	Also featuring	Movie	Music	Writer	Label
2015	Saibo (Rendition)	Jonita Gandhi	Rendition	Arjun Kanungo, Sachin-Jigar	Sachin-Jigar	Sony Music
2015	Hasi (Rendition)	Sanah Moidutty	Rendition	Ami Mishra	Kunaal Vermaa	Sony Music
2015	Baaki Baatein Peene Baad	Badshah	Single	Arjun Kanungo, Ludwig Lindell, Ylva Dimberg	Mayur Puri	Sony Music
2016	Fursat	Sonal Chauhan	Single	Arjun Kanungo, Ludwig Lindell, Ylva Dimberg	Mayur Puri	Sony Music
2016	Sanam Mere sanam		Jammin Season 1	Mithoon	Sayyed Quadri	Independent
2016	Yaara	Sanam (band), Jonita Gandhi, Sanah Moidutty	Jammin' Season 1	A.R. Rahman	A.R. Rahman	Independent
2016	Saturday Saturday (Khul Jaaye Masti)	Badshah, Pulkit Samrat, Aastha Gill	Single	Badshah	Badshah	Sony Music
2017	Ek Dafaa		Single	Arjun Kanungo, A.R. Rehman	Mayur Puri, A.R.Rehman	Sony Music
2017	Gallan Tipsiyaan		Single	Arjun Kanungo, LH4L	Vayu	Sony Music
2018	La La La	Neha Kakkar	Single	Arjun Kanungo, Bilal Saeed	Bilal Saeed, Arjun Kanungo	Desi Music Factory
2018	La La La (Reprise)		Reprise version	Arjun Kanungo, Bilal Saeed	Arjun Kanungo, Bilal Saeed	Desi Music Factory
2018	Aaya Na Tu	Momina Mustahsen	Single	Arjun Kanungo, Momina Mustehsan	Kunaal Vermaa	VYRL/ Universal Music
2018	Aaya Na Tu Reprise		Reprise version	Arjun Kanungo	Kunaal Vermaa	VYRL/ Universal Music
2018	Sar Utha Ke Jiyo	Jonita Gandhi	Promotional	Arjun Kanungo	Arjun Kanungo, Kunaal Vermaa	Universal Music
2019	Tu Na Mera		Single	Arjun Kanungo	Kunaal Vermaa	VYRL/ Universal Music
2019	Woh Baarishein	Shriya Pilgaokar	Single	Arjun Kanungo	Manoj Muntashir	VYRL/ Universal Music
2019	Hona Chaida		Single	Arjun Kanungo, Nisha Asnani & Leny Magoufakis	Mayur Puri	VYRL/ Universal Music
2020	Dil Kho Ke	Jonita Gandhi	Promotional	Arjun Kanungo	Abhishek Arora, Anvita Dutt, Arjun Kanungo, Razik Mujawar	Universal Music
2020	Woh Baarishein Reprise		Reprise Version	Arjun Kanungo	Manoj Muntashir	VYRL/ Universal Music
2020	Tum Na Ho	Prakriti Kakkar, Awez Darbar, Nagma Mirajkar	Single	Ajay Vyaas	Kunaal Vermaa	VYRL/ Universal Music
2020	Fursat Hai Aaj Bhi	Sonal Chauhan	Single	Arjun Kanungo	Mayur Puri	VYRL/ Universal Music
2020	Yeh Chahatein		Single	Arjun Kanungo	Arjun Kanungo	One Mind Music
2020	Waada Hai	Shehnaaz Gill	Single with Shehnaaz Gill	Arjun Kanungo & Shehnaaz Gill	Manoj Muntashir	VYRL/ Universal Music
2020	Waada Hai Reprise		Reprise Version	Arjun Kanungo	Manoj Muntashir	VYRL/ Universal Music
2020	Statue	Fotty Seven	Promotional	Arjun Kanungo	Fotty Seven	Universal Music
2021	Mere Dil Vich	Tanzeel Khan	Single	Arjun Kanungo	Tanzeel Khan	One Mind Music
2021	Famous		Single	Arjun Kanungo	Arjun Kanungo	One Mind Music
2021	Famous ft. Fotty Seven	Fotty Seven	Single	Arjun Kanungo	Arjun Kanungo, Fotty Seven	One Mind Music
2021	Famous ft. King	King	Single	Arjun Kanungo	Arjun Kanungo, King	One Mind Music
2021	Dil Kisi Se	Nikki Tamboli	Single	Arjun Kanungo	Kunaal Vermaa	Saregama
2022	Baha Le Ja		Single	Arjun Kanungo	Kunaal Vermaa	Saregama
2022	Tera Tha Tera Hoon	Iulia Vântur	Single	Arjun Kanungo	Kunaal Vermaa	Zee Music
2022	Ilzaam	King, Carla Dennis	INDUSTRY (Album)	Arjun Kanungo, King	Arjun Kanungo, King	One Mind Music
2022	Bura Sapna	Sana Sultan	INDUSTRY (Album)	Arjun Kanungo	Arjun Kanungo	One Mind Music
2022	Barsaat		INDUSTRY (Album)	Arjun Kanungo	Kunaal Vermaa	One Mind Music
2022	Waapas Aa Jao	Yash Vaid	INDUSTRY (Album)	Arjun Kanungo, Yash Vaid	Arjun Kanungo, Yash Vaid	One Mind Music
2022	Foto	Rashmeet Kaur	INDUSTRY (Album)	Arjun Kanungo	IP Singh	One Mind Music
2022	Ishq Samundar	King	INDUSTRY (Album)	Arjun Kanungo, King	Arjun Kanungo, King	One Mind Music
2022	Everything sucks (India Remix)	Vaultboy	INDUSTRY (Album)	Arjun Kanungo	Arjun Kanungo, Vaultboy, Dhruv Yogii	One Mind Music
2022	Zara Zara (MTV Unwind)		MTV unwind (TV show)	Harris Jayaraj, Arjun Kanungo	Harris Jayaraj	Saregama Music
2022	Chura Liya (MTV Unwind)		MTV unwind (TV show)	Arjun Kanungo, RD Burman		Saregama Music
2022	Rangrez	Aisha Sharma	Single	Anurag Saikia	Shakeel Azmi	Sony Music
2022	Tang Mujhko		Single	Arjun Kanungo	Arjun Kanungo	One Mind Music
2022	Killer Haseena	Tulsi Kumar	Single	Arjun Kanungo	Vayu, Diksha C	T-series
2022	Gedi	Channa Jandali	Single	Arjun Kanungo	IP Singh	Universal Music
2023	Teri Aadat	Sandro Silva, DJ Shadow	Single	Arjun Kanungo	Arjun Kanungo, Dhruv Yogii	Spinnin Records
2023	India to Japan	Cyber Rui, Shirley Setia	INDUSTRY 2 (Album)	Arjun Kanungo	Arjun Kanungo	One Mind Music
2023	Kismat		INDUSTRY 2 (Album)	Arjun Kanungo	Arjun Kanungo	One Mind Music
2023	Kehne ko kya raha	Nemo	INDUSTRY 2 (Album)	Arjun Kanungo	Arjun Kanungo	One Mind Music
2023	Danger	Ju!ie	INDUSTRY 2 (Album)	Arjun Kanungo	Arjun Kanungo	One Mind Music
2023	Sach Bata Mujhe	Shirley Setia	INDUSTRY 2 (Album)	Arjun Kanungo	Arjun Kanungo	One Mind Music
2023	Kismat (extended)		INDUSTRY 2 (Album)	Arjun Kanungo	Arjun Kanungo	One Mind Music
2023	Tu Hain	Zaeden	INDUSTRY 2 (Album)	Arjun Kanungo	Arjun Kanungo	One Mind Music
2023	Destiny		INDUSTRY 2 (Album)	Arjun Kanungo	Arjun Kanungo	One Mind Music
2024	Tell Me	Ren	Single	Arjun Kanungo, Kanata Okajima, Ren	Arjun Kanungo, Ren	One Mind Music
2024	Lobby Talk	Ocean Sharma, Nesz	Single	Arjun Kanungo	Arjun Kanungo	One Mind Music
2024	Suno Na	Chamath Sangeeth	Single	Chamath Sangeeth	Murtuza Gadiwala	One Mind Music
2024	Mahi Ve	Shivvyy	Single	Arjun Kanungo, Shivvyy	Shivvyy	One Mind Music
2024	Sajna		Single	Arjun Kanungo	Arjun Kanungo	One Mind Music
2024	Inni Soni	Prince Sharma	Single	Arjun Kanungo, Prince Sharma	Prince Sharma	T-Series
2024	Make up your mind	Fotty Seven, Edwin Honoret, Nemo	Single	Arjun Kanungo, Fotty Seven, Edwin Honoret, Nemo	Arjun Kanungo, Fotty Seven, Edwin Honoret	One Mind Music
2025	Unspoken		Single	Arjun Kanungo, Shivvyy	Arjun Kanungo, Shivvyy	
2025	Helpless	Rajath Rao, Aakash	Single	Rajath Rao, Aakash, Plushy, Arjun Kanungo	IP Singh	One Mind Music
2025	Naqsh	IP Singh, Madhubanti Bagchi	Single	Arjun Kanungo	IP Singh	
2025	Helpless Unplugged (AMV Studio Session)		Single	Arjun Kanungo	Arjun Kanungo, IP Singh	One Mind Music
2025	Ai No Imi	MINA	Single	Arjun Kanungo	Arjun Kanungo, Kaz Kuwamura, Taiga Kunii	One Mind Music
2025	Kalia 4	Rapper Big Deal	Single	Samir Rishu Mohanty	Samir Rishu Mohanty	
2025	Swiping Left		Single	Arjun Kanungo, Rapper Big Deal	Arjun Kanungo, Rapper Big Deal	One Mind Music
2025	DOBARA	Akbar Wasif	Single	Akbar Wasif	Akbar Wasif	One Mind Music
2025	Na Marende	Anjana Padmanabam	Single	Rajath Rao	Tamil Mani	One Mind Music
2025	Market		Ekaki (Original Soundtrack)	MC SANDYY	MC SANDYY	One Mind Music
2025	Porancha Ranga	Umesh Gawali	Ekaki (Original Soundtrack)	Arjun Kanungo	Manohar Golambre	One Mind Music
2025	Kehne Ko Kya Raha		Ekaki (Original Soundtrack)	Arjun Kanungo	IP Singh	One Mind Music

== Awards and honors ==
Award	Year	Song/Film	Category	Result	Ref
Global Indian Music Academy Awards	2015	Baaki Baatein Peene Baad	Jagjit Singh Award for Best Music Debut - Non Film	Won	
IWMBuzz Awards	2019		Most popular music single artist	Won	
12th Mirchi Music Awards	2020	Woh Baarishein	Independent Song of the Year	Nominated	

== Personal life ==
As a nature enthusiast, Kanungo promotes green energy and other alternative energy sources. He has also planted over 800 trees.

He is also a three-time national gold medalist in center fire pistol shooting and a national-level basketball player.

Kanungo's father, Rajendra Mehta, died from liver cancer in April, 2022.

In February 2023, Kanungo suffered a hip fracture after an accident, while on vacation with his wife in the Maldives which forced him to take a break from public life for over a year.
