= Sher (film) =

2015 Telugu film directed by Mallikarjun

- Film poster
- Directed by: A. Mallikarjun
- Screenplay by: A. Mallikarjun
- Story by: Diamond Ratna Babu
- Produced by: Komara Venkatesh
- Starring: Kalyan Ram; Sonal Chauhan; Vikramjeet Virk; Mukesh Rishi
- Cinematography: Sarvesh Murari
- Edited by: Kotagiri Venkateswara Rao
- Music by: S. Thaman
- Release date: 30 October 2015
- Country: India
- Language: Telugu

Sher (transl. Lion) is a 2015 Indian Telugu-language action film directed by Mallikarjun. The film stars Kalyan Ram, Sonal Chauhan, Vikramjeet Virk and Mukesh Rishi. The film revolves around Gautham, a young man who disrupts a gangster's wedding and eventually finds his loved ones threatened. Featuring a soundtrack composed by S. Thaman, the film was released theatrically on 30 October 2015 to a negative critical reception and commercial failure.

== Plot ==
Pappi is a criminal who's about to marry a girl against her will, until Gautam arrives on a bike and takes her away. They're chased, but Gautam manages to marry the girl to the man she likes. Enraged, Pappi threatens to torture Gautam's family as a form of revenge, but the latter mocks and warns him in turn. Nandini is a photographer who falls for Gautam upon seeing him prevent the tricolor from falling down. However, she hasn't seen him and it's only the tattoo on his hands through which she recognizes him. With passing time, they meet and fall for each other, before Pappi meets Nandini's father Sharath Chandra and convinces him for his marriage to her in exchange for a promotion. Paapi invites his father Dada, a Kolkata-based criminal, to attend his engagement, while Nandini tells about this to Gautam, who meets Sharath and makes a deal with him: Gautam asks him for his gun and the list of Dada and his gang members so that he can kill them and sharat can take responsibility for the "encounter killings". Sharath agrees and Gautam kills his first target Babbar, Dada's right hand. Afraid that Dada might kill Sharath if he takes the responsibility for Babbar's encounter, he decides to announce it publicly after Gautam kills Dada in the future. Following Babbar's death, Pappi's engagement is stopped and he receives a DVD in which terrorists take responsibility for Babbar's murder. He nevertheless decides to marry Nandini within the next 30 days.

Gautam and his partner Brahmi are taken hostage by Pappi who makes them stay in their house. Gautam and Nandini conspire to convince Pappi to postpone the marriage, but instead he prepones it and informs Dada about his marriage. Dada scolds him, and tells him that his brother Chotu has arrived in the city and taken Babbar's corpse for forensic tests. Learning this, Gautam and Brahmi wear masks and beat up Chotu, who arrives at Pappi's house and stops the marriage. He then recalls one of the attackers had a tattoo on their right hand but is unable to understand the language it was written in (Telugu). Later, Dr. Kanakarathnam arrives with an image from Babbar's corpse's retina. However, it turns out to be an image of one of the superstars in whose disguise Gautam and Brahmi had beaten up Chotu. It is then revealed that due to being tortured, the doctor had joined hands with Gautam and also erased the tattoo from his hand.

Pappi becomes disillusioned by the constant hindrances and decides to call off the wedding. Worried about his deal with Sharath, Gautam introduces a "Lungi" Baba who tells Pappi that he can marry but first he must invite his father Dada and uncle Chotta. As Chotta arrives, Gauatam attacks and kills him along with his henchmen. Gautam's father, Raghuram sees him kill Chotta, and Gautam tells him that he did it because when had gone to Kolkata to attend his younger brother Ajay's chess competition, his brother won it but got killed by Dada when he was found filming them killing a man. His mother was injured severely by them too and thus admitted to a hospital where she told Gautam to kill Dada and his men, but since he knew nothing about them, he went back to the spot where his brother died and through his phone viewed the recording. Upon finalizing his targets, he met Bharat and made the deal which was actually for revenge. He couldn't tell his father about this fearing he might get shattered. They then go to meet Gautam's mother, following which Dada calls Gautam and tells him he knew about him through a CCTV recording of the spot where Ajay died. Gautam arrives on the spot where Nandini has been held hostage and in the ensuing fight kills Chotu, Dada and many of his henchmen. Brahmi meets and hands over the proof of murders to Bharat, who calls the home minister and tells him he found the killer with proof. Hearing this, Brahmi flees away, while Pappi gathers a few more henchmen and is stopped by Lungi Baba who asks him whether he wants to marry or die. He says he wants to marry, and goes along with him.

== Cast ==
- Nandamuri Kalyan Ram as Gautam
- Sonal Chauhan as Nandini
- Vikramjeet Virk as Pappi
- Mukesh Rishi as Dadha
- Mahesh Manjrekar as Lala
- Sachin Khedekar as Bada
- Ashish Vidyarthi as Chotta
- Raghu Babu as Raghu Police Commissioner
- Sayaji Shinde as IPS Sharath Chandra, Nandini’s father
- Brahmanandam as Bramhi/Gautam
- Ali as Dr. Kanakarathnam
- Shafi as Chotu
- M. S. Narayana as Lungi Baba
- Posani Krishna Murali as Dadha's assistant
- Sravan as Babbar
- Rao Ramesh as Raghuram, Gautam's father
- Rohini as Gautam's mother
- Shailaja Priya as Nandini’s mother
- Mounica as Nandini’s sister
- Master Gaurav as Ajay
- Sudigali Sudheer as Pradeep
- Prudhvi Raj as Pappi's uncle
- Fish Venkat as Pappi's henchman
- Prabhas Sreenu as Pappi's henchman
- Raghu Karumanchi as Pappi's henchman
- Thagubothu Ramesh as Drunkard
- Vajja Venkata Giridhar as Chaturvedi S.I.
- Bharath Raju
- Kadambari Kiran
- Ram Prasad
- Getup Srinu
- Racha Ravi
- Nora Fatehi as an item number "Napere Pinky"

== Production ==
Sonal Chauhan replaced Vanya Mishra in the film.

== Soundtrack ==
The Music was composed by S. Thaman and released by Junglee Music on 10 October 2015.

Sher

Soundtrack album by S. Thaman
- Released: 10 October 2015
- Recorded: 2015
- Genre: Soundtrack
- Length: 17:49
- Label: Junglee Music
- Producer: S. Thaman

S. Thaman chronology
Bruce Lee - The Fighter (2015)	Sher (2015)	Dictator (2015)

Track list
No.	Title	Lyrics	Singer(s)	Length
1.	"Rama Rama Hare Rama"	Sri Mani	Deepak	2:51
2.	"Suragani"	Sri Mani	Deepak, Mali	3:49
3.	"Chal Chalona"	Sri Mani	Suchith Suresan, Sameera Bharadwaj, Sanjana Kalmanje	3:39
4.	"Naina Naina"	Kandikonda	Anudeep Dev, Sanjaya Kalmanje	3:55
5.	"Napere Pinky"	Varikuppala Yadagiri	M. M. Manasi, Simha	3:35
Total length:				17:49

== Critical reception ==
123Telugu gave it 2.75 stars out of 5, praising Kalyan Ram's performance, Thaman's music and the first half, while criticizing the second half and lack of emotions. Times of India gave it 2 stars out of 5, praising the shorter running time while criticizing the overall execution. Fullhyd gave it 1 star out of 5, criticizing the technical aspects and writing.

== Release ==
Makers announces the release date as 30 October 2015.
