= Dictator (2016 film) =

2016 film directed by Sriwass

- Theatrical release poster
- Directed by: Sriwass
- Screenplay by: Kona Venkat; Gopimohan; Sriwass
- Dialogues by: M. Rathnam
- Story by: Kona Venkat; Gopimohan
- Produced by: Kishore Lulla; Sunil Lulla; Sriwass
- Starring: Nandamuri Balakrishna; Anjali; Sonal Chauhan; Vikramjeet Virk
- Cinematography: Chota K. Naidu
- Edited by: Gautham Raju
- Music by: S. Thaman
- Production companies: Eros International; Vedhaaswa Creations
- Distributed by: Eros International
- Release date: 14 January 2016
- Running time: 150 mins
- Country: India
- Language: Telugu
- Box office: ₹35.70 crore

Dictator is a 2016 Indian Telugu-language action comedy film, jointly produced by Eros International & Sriwass under Vedhaaswa Creations banner and directed by Sriwass. The film stars Nandamuri Balakrishna, Anjali, Sonal Chauhan and Vikramjeet Virk. The music is composed by S. Thaman.

It is the 99th movie in the career of Nandamuri Balakrishna. The film's script was written by Sridhar Seepana, Gopimohan and Kona Venkat while the dialogues were written by M. Ratnam. The movie was released on 14 January 2016. Later the movie was dubbed into Hindi as Yudh: Ek Jung by Cinekorn Movies in 2016. The film opened up to mixed to positive reviews and was a commercial success at the box-office.

== Plot ==
The film opens in Hyderabad, where Chandu lives with the family of his wife, Kathyayini, who is currently working in Delhi. Chandu is an ordinary employee at the Dharma Group of Industries. He soon befriends Indu, an aspiring actress who is in desperate need of help because dangerous gangsters are hunting her brother. When the criminals abduct Indu, Chandu fights them off to rescue her. This heroic act inadvertently makes him enemies with Minister Govardhan Rao and a corrupt police officer, Prabhakar.

Meanwhile, Chandu’s coworker, Babji, steals a large sum of money from the company to fund his daughter's wedding. To protect his friend, Chandu takes the blame for the theft. This sacrifice catches the attention of the company's chief, Rajasekhar Dharma. Demanding answers, Chandu's father-in-law, Lakshmi Narayana, confronts him. In a stunning twist, Chandu is revealed to be Chandrashekar Dharma—"The Dictator"—the actual chairman of the Dharma Group.

A flashback reveals Chandrashekar's true identity as a powerful Indian tycoon who wages war against the mafia. He had fallen in love with Kathyayini, an employee at his company. Because her father, Lakshmi Narayana, despised the elite class, Kathyayini introduced Chandrashekar as a regular colleague, and the two married in secret. Chaos erupted when a ruthless matriarch, Mahima Roy, and her malicious son-in-law, Vishwambhar, murdered Chandrashekar’s mentor, Hari Prasad. In retaliation, Chandrashekar targeted their empire.

Mahima kidnapped Chandrashekar’s family, demanding that he surrender and bow before her. However, Chandrashekar outsmarted her; Mahima began receiving panicked phone calls from her relatives across the globe, revealing that Chandrashekar’s vast network had already taken them hostage. Chandrashekar then killed Vishwambhar. In the ensuing chaos, Mahima stabbed Kathyayini. To honor his injured wife's plea for peace, Chandrashekar stepped down, adopted a fake identity, and left Delhi.

In the present day, Chandrashekar discovers that Vishwambhar actually survived the past encounter through the betrayal of insider informants. Chandrashekar decides to return to action. His cunning uncle, Sivaram, seemingly betrays him by tipping off Vishwambhar about "The Dictator's" arrival at a tribute event for Hari Prasad. However, when Vishwambhar attacks, Sivaram switches sides. It is revealed that the betrayal was a calculated trap orchestrated by Chandrashekar to lure the villain into the open. Chandrashekar permanently eliminates Vishwambhar and orders Mahima to exile herself from the country. The movie concludes with Chandrashekar Dharma reclaiming his throne and continuing his legacy.

== Cast ==
- Nandamuri Balakrishna as Chandrashekhar Dharma "Chandu"/ Dictator
- Anjali as Kathyayani, Chandu's wife
- Sonal Chauhan as Indu, neighbour
- Vikramjeet Virk as Vicky Bhai
- Rati Agnihotri as Mahima Rai
- Kulbhushan Kharbanda as Hari Prasad
- Aksha Pardasany as Shruti, Kathyayani's cousin
- Nassar as Lakshmi Narayana, Kathyayani's father
- Suman as Rajashekar Dharma, Chandu's brother
- Nawab Shah as Vishwambhar, Mahima's son-in-law
- Kabir Duhan Singh as Pandu Bhai
- Sayaji Shinde as Bokha Sivaram
- Chalapathi Rao as I.G.
- Vennela Kishore as Kathyayani's brother
- Rajiv Kanakala as Indu's brother
- Raghu Babu as Vasthu Bheeshmacharya
- Y. Kasi Viswanath as Babji
- Prudhviraj as Ramesh Patro
- Posani Krishna Murali as Chandrashekhar Dharma's P.A.
- Ajay as Inspector Prabhakar (Corrupted Police Officer)
- Madhusudhan Rao as Minister Goverdhan Rao
- Ravi Prakash as Inspector Rasool
- Ravi Babu as Director
- Vamsi Krishna as Minister's son
- Kalyani Natarajan as Mrs. Lakshmi Narayana
- Pavitra Lokesh as Rajashekar's wife
- Ashok Kumar as Lakshmi Narayana's brother
- Prabhas Sreenu as Prabha
- Duvvasi Mohan as Prasad
- Hema as Hema Patnaik
- G. V. Sudhakar Naidu as Goon
- Ravi Varma as Shruti's husband
- Satya Prakash as Saxena
- Banerjee as Mahima Rai's P.A.
- Shawar Ali
- Gundu Sudarshan
- Giridhar as Kathyayani's brother
- Ping Pong Surya as Babji's son
- Mukhtar Khan as Goon
- Deekshithulu as Rasool's assistant
- Ambati Srinivas as Minister's son P.A.
- Lab Sarath as Doctor
- Junior Relangi as Kishanji
- Shraddha Das as item number "Tingo Tingo"
- Mumaith Khan as item number "Tingo Tingo"

== Soundtrack ==
Dictator

Soundtrack album by S. Thaman
- Released: 20 December 2015
- Recorded: 2015
- Genre: Film soundtrack
- Length: 25:32
- Language: Telugu
- Label: Eros Music
- Producer: S. Thaman

S. Thaman chronology
Sher (2015)	Dictator (2015)	Chakravyuha (2016)

Music composed by S. Thaman. Music released on EROS Music Company. The music of the film was launched on 20 December 2015 at Amaravati, the new Capital city of Andhra Pradesh. This movie was the first to release its audio at Amaravati. As this movie is 99th film in Balakrishna's career, the association of 'Balayya Helping Hands' organised a rally from KBR Park, Hyderabad to Audio Launch Venue at Amaravati with 99 cars with the permission of Government of Andhra Pradesh. First Audio CD copy was released by Rayapati Sambasiva Rao and presented it to Balakrishna. Anjali, Andhra Pradesh's Agriculture Minister Prathipati Pulla Rao, Ravela Kishore Babu, Sonal Chouhan, Korrapati Ranganatha Sai, Anil Sunkara, Ram Achanta, Ramajogayya Sastry, Chota K. Naidu, Brahma Kadali, Ambika krishna, Sreedhar Seepana, Kona Venkat, Gopi Mohan, Raghu Babu and others were present at this event.

Tracklist
No.	Title	Lyrics	Singer(s)	Length
1.	"Gam Gam Ganesha"	Ramajogayya Sastry	Divya Kumar, Deepak, Sai Charan, Nivas	04:28
2.	"Whats Up Baby"	Ramajogayya Sastry	Naveen, Malavika	04:38
3.	"Chura Chura"	Ramajogayya Sastry	Sanjana, Sri Krishna	03:56
4.	"Tingo Tingo"	Varikuppala Yadagiri	Kousalya, Geetha Madhuri, Simha	04:37
5.	"Dictator"	Ramajogayya Sastry	Sathyan, Solar Sai, Sai Sharan, Naveen, Sri Krishna	03:10
6.	"Gana Gana"	Bhaskarabhatla Ravi Kumar	Sameera Bharadwaj, Deepak, Simha	04:20
Total length:				25:32

=== Reception ===
Music Review
Review scores
Source	Rating
IndiaGlitz	3/5 stars

Indiaglitz in its review states that "Dictator is an album that is for the mass and class audiences alike. Chura Chura.. stands out and is sure to be on the chartbusters. Gana Gana works lyrically."

== Production ==
Production of this action drama film began at Ramanaidu Studios in Hyderabad on 29 May 2015. Telugu actress Anjali and Balakrishna will star in this film, to be produced and directed by Sriwass (Loukyam fame). In early July 2015, actress Sonal Chauhan was signed as one of the female lead in the film. This movie is the first Telugu film produced by Eros International Media Limited. Regular shooting for this film commenced on 20 July 2015. The lead actor Nandamuri Balakrishna lost 12 Kilograms of weight for the role in this movie. A wonderful set was built in Ramanaidu Studios, Hyderabad for this movie. First schedule of the movie with few action sequences was shot in this set for 25 days. Introduction song written by Ramajogayya Sastry titled Gam Gam Gam Ganesha... Gouri Tanaya Sarvesha... with theme on Lord Ganesha was shot in a big set designed by Brahma Kadali at Chithrapuri Colony, Hyderabad with 99 dancers and more than 2000 junior artists under the choreographer Prem Rakshith.

On 24 August 2015, Eros International Media Ltd released a press note saying that the movie had completed its first schedule in Hyderabad. Second schedule of this movie was planned in Europe where some talkie part, few fights and songs was shot. In the end of August 2015, the movie unit started shooting in Bulgaria at exotic locations. The movie unit completed another schedule at Delhi on 2 December 2015; and the final schedule with heavy mass, fight sequences in the second week of December at Hyderabad. On 18 December 2015, the film director Sriwass announced that shooting part was complete except for one song. The last song Tingo Tingo under choreography of Prem Rakshith, was shot at Hyderabad completing the shooting part of the film. Shraddha Das and the popular Item song dancer Mumaith Khan paired up with Balakrishna in this song.

== Box office ==
Dictator collected ₹10 crore gross at the worldwide box office on its first day, and fetched its distributors ₹ 7.5 crore. It has beaten the record of Lion and become the second-biggest opener for Balakrishna after Legend. It has collected ₹18 crore gross at the AP/Telangana box office in its four-day-extended first weekend.
