= Bbuddah... Hoga Terra Baap =

2011 Indian film by Puri Jagannadh

- Theatrical release poster
- Directed by: Puri Jagannadh
- Written by: Dialogues: Inaamulhaq; Ajay Kumar
- Screenplay by: Rishi-Vipul
- Story by: Puri Jagannadh; Ajay Kumar
- Produced by: Abhishek Bachchan; Puri Jagannadh; Viacom 18 Motion Pictures
- Starring: Amitabh Bachchan; Hema Malini; Sonu Sood; Prakash Raj; Sonal Chauhan; Charmy Kaur; Rajeev Verma; Subbaraju; Makrand Deshpande
- Cinematography: Amol Rathod
- Edited by: M. S. Rajashekhar Reddy (S. R. Shekhar)
- Music by: Songs: Vishal–Shekhar; Score: Anup Rubens
- Production companies: Amitabh Bachchan Corporation Limited; Viacom 18 Motion Pictures
- Distributed by: Viacom 18 Motion Pictures
- Release date: 1 July 2011
- Running time: 118 minutes
- Country: India
- Language: Hindi

Bbuddah... Hoga Terra Baap (transl. Who are you calling old? (Note: Literally, "Your dad must be old" (as a sarcastic response to being called old).)) is a 2011 Indian Hindi-language action comedy film written and directed by Puri Jagannadh in his second Hindi film after Shart: The Challenge. The film stars Amitabh Bachchan, Hema Malini, Sonu Sood, and Prakash Raj in the lead roles, while Sonal Chauhan, Charmy Kaur, Rajeev Verma, Subbaraju, and Makrand Deshpande play supporting roles, and Raveena Tandon makes a guest appearance. The music of the film was composed by Vishal–Shekhar with cinematography by Amol Rathod and editing by S. R. Shekhar.

The film was released on 1 July 2011 to positive responses from critics praising Bachchan’s performance and Jagannadh’s dialogues and direction and became a box office hit.

== Plot ==
ACP Karan has vowed to eliminate all gangsters from Mumbai within two months. In response, gangster Kabir Bhai decides to eliminate Karan instead. Enter Vijju, a seasoned hitman who refuses to acknowledge his advancing age, returning to Mumbai after a long exile in Paris, France, to carry out one final job.

While the gangsters and Vijju attempt to take down Karan, the ACP is simultaneously trying to woo his former college friend Tanya. Meanwhile, Tanya's friend Amrita attempts to unravel the mysterious relationship between Vijju and her mother, Kamini "Kammo", suspecting that they may have had an affair years earlier due to Kamini's overly friendly demeanour towards Vijju.

Vijju later reveals a shocking truth: he is not a contract killer, but is actually trying to protect his son, ACP Karan. He explains that he was once a gangster, and that his violent lifestyle ultimately led to his separation from his wife, Sita, and subsequently from his son. Karan was unaware of his father's identity, as his mother had never spoken about him. Vijju also clarifies that he never had an affair with Kamini.

Despite reuniting with his estranged wife Sita, Vijju fails to reconcile with her. However, Karan successfully wins over Tanya and her conservative father. Tragedy strikes when Tedha shoots Karan, despite Vijju's attempts to prevent the confrontation. A wounded and furious Vijju admits Karan to hospital before visiting Kabir's den.

After reciting a short story and explaining its three morals, Vijju informs the gangsters that Karan is alive and that the den is surrounded by police, while accusing Tedha of being an undercover officer. A fierce shootout ensues, during which Vijju kills most of the confused gangsters, leaving only Kabir and his aide Mac alive.

Believing Tedha to be a traitor, Kabir kills him. He is then shocked to learn that Vijju is Karan's father and that Tedha was not an undercover officer. Vijju shoots Kabir in the head but spares Mac. At the hospital, Vijju finally acknowledges his age and reconciles with Sita, asking whether he should reveal his identity to Karan.

Sita forbids him from doing so, and Vijju decides to return to Paris, with the understanding that Sita will bring Karan to him when she is ready to confront the secret. And it is understood that they finally Reunited as one

== Cast ==
- Amitabh Bachchan as Vijay "Vijju" Malhotra
- Hema Malini as Sita Malhotra, Vijju's wife
- Sonu Sood as ACP Karan Malhotra, Vijju's son
- Prakash Raj as Kabir, international Don
- Sonal Chauhan as Tanya Nath
- Charmy Kaur as Amrita Chawla
- Rajeev Verma as Mirchi Baba
- Subbaraju as Tedha
- Makrand Deshpande as Mac
- Vishwajeet Pradhan as Sub-Inspector Shinde
- Shawar Ali as Anju
- Raveena Tandon as Kamini "Kammo" Chawla(Cameo)
- Rajeev Mehta as Prem Nath, Taniya's father
- Atul Parchure as the inspector at the airport
- Ajaz Khan as a sharpshooter
- Ikhlaque Khan as Amrita's father
- Supriya Shukla as Meenakshi, House owner

== Production ==
The director Jagannadh wanted to hire three leading heroines for the movie, which was originally titled Buddah. Finally he zeroed down on Hema Malini, Raveena Tandon and Charmy Kaur, an actress from South India who will be making her Bollywood debut in this movie. Actress Neha Sharma was also interested in doing Kaur's role, but eventually the role went to Kaur. Tandon later said that she signed the movie to work with Bachchan and Jagannadh. For another role in the movie, both Sonal Chauhan and Kangana Ranaut were in discussion, but eventually the role went to Chauhan.

The 'mahurat' shot of the movie was done in March 2011 at Khoja Bungalow in Versova. While Jagannadh broke the coconut, actor Sonu Sood featured in the mahurat shot. The event was also attended by Bachchan, his son Abhishek Bachchan, daughter-in-law Aishwarya Rai Bachchan, and actress Sonal Chauhan.

On 26 April 2011, movie's shooting was disrupted, when Raj Thackeray led Maharashtra Navnirman Sena claimed that there were around 40 foreigners shooting in the movie without proper work permits and visas. MNS filed a police complaint in this regard and later stalled the shooting. Following day, director Jagannadh apologised to the outfit stating that there were indeed few junior foreign artists in the shoot without proper documentation, and assured to be more vigilant in future. Raveena Tandon has also shot for an item song in the film, titled "Main Chandigarh Di Star".

== Marketing ==
The first 60-second promo of the movie was revealed on 20 May 2011 on eight TV channels during IPL match of Mumbai Indians and Rajasthan Royals.

== Soundtrack ==
Bbuddah Hoga Terra Baap

Soundtrack album by Vishal–Shekhar
- Released: 13 June 2011
- Genre: Film soundtrack
- Label: T-Series

The music of the film was composed by Vishal–Shekhar, while the lyrics were penned by Anvita Dutt Guptan, Vishal Dadlani and Swanand Kirkire.

=== Track listing ===
No.	Title	Lyrics	Singer(s)	Length
1.	"Bbuddah Hoga Terra Baap" (Accapella)	Vishal Dadlani	Amitabh Bachchan	2:46
2.	"Bbuddah Hoga Terra Baap" (Dub Step)	Vishal Dadlani	Amitabh Bachchan, Vishal Dadlani	3:21
3.	"Go Meera Go"	Anvita Dutt Guptan	Amitabh Bachchan, Abhishek Bachchan	6:42
4.	"Haal-E-Dil"	Swanand Kirkire, Anvita Dutt Guptan	Amitabh Bachchan, Monali Thakur	5:20
5.	"Main Chandigarh Di Star"	Anvita Dutt Guptan	Sunidhi Chauhan	3:18

== Critical reception ==
Raja Sen of Rediff gave it four out of five stars and stated, "Bbuddah Hoga Tera Baap is not a particularly well-crafted film, but none of that matters as Amitabh Bachchan makes it work." Nikhat Kazmi from the Times of India gave a three and a half stars and stated, "Bbuddah... is a high dose entertainer when the veteran actor never stops amazing you with the range of his histrionics. Despite his age, he grabs eyeballs with his action cuts, his comic cameos, his romantic ditties (with Hema), his libidinous encounters (with Raveena), his emotional bytes, his derring-do, and his over-the top sartorial sense." Taran Adarsh gave a four out of five stars and noted, "On the whole, Bbuddah Hoga Terra Baap is a must-watch for Bachchan fans. Even if you're not a fan of this iconic actor, watch it for a simple reason: They don't make them like Amitabh Bachchan anymore. A masala entertainer all the way. Bachchan is truly the Baap, and this film reiterates this fact yet again. His character, his attitude and the dialogue he delivers will remain etched in your memory for a long, long time. Prakash Raj is super. In fact, it's a treat to watch powerful actors like Bachchan and Prakash Raj embroiled in a confrontation."

Filmfare gave a four star rating and said, "Bbuddah... Hoga Terra Baap is a feast for Amitabh Bachchan buffs. The film ends with a disclaimer saying it's a tribute to the phenomenon, and that says it all." Zee News also gave four stars and stated,"‘Bbuddah Hoga Terra Baap' is a typical Bollywood masala flick with all the ingredients to make it a Box Office hit. An out-an-out Amitabh Bachchan film, 'Bbuddah Hoga Terra Baap' presents Big B in never before seen role, something which reminds you of the exhilarating performance of the iconic star in his earlier films." Sify gave a two and a half star rating and explained, "Big B's presence is so overwhelming he makes the character— a violent, unlikable one—into a somewhat charismatic one. The altercations between Bachchan and the villain (Prakash Raj, fab) are to watch out for, especially towards the end. Also worth savoring are the Amitabh-Hema portions, where they create magic momentarily. It's an average story with archaic storytelling. If you're watching it, keep in mind that Big B is the only thing going for the film." Komal Nahta of Koimoi gave it 2 stars.

== Box office ==
The domestic opening weekend collection were around ₹85 million (US$910,000). In the overseas markets, the film collected ₹22.5 million (US$240,000) from US, UK, UAE and Australia over the opening weekend. Within nearly a week post the release, the film collected ₹115 million (US$1.2 million) net domestically and another ₹40 million (US$430,000) net overseas. The film collected ₹32.5 million (US$350,000) nett over its second weekend, bringing the two-week total to ₹190 million (US$2.0 million). BHTB Recovered all its production cost from theatrical revenues and additional non-theatrical earnings thus ensuring it to be a good profitable venture. The satellite rights fetched the producers approximately ₹990 million (US$11 million)
