= Skyfire (TV series) =

Indian Action Thriller web series

- Genre: Action, Thriller
- Screenplay by: Suresh Nair; Shreyes Lowlekar
- Directed by: Soumik Sen
- Starring: Prateik Babbar; Sonal Chauhan; Jisshu Sengupta; Jatin Goswami; Shataf Figar
- Country of origin: India
- Original language: Hindi
- No. of seasons: 1
- No. of episodes: 8 (list of episodes)

Production
- Producers: Satya Mahapatra; Ekant Babani
- Production location: India
- Camera setup: Multi-camera
- Running time: 35 mins (approx.)
- Production companies: Shabinaa Entertainment; Alligator Media Productions

Original release
- Release: 22 May 2019

Skyfire is an Indian sci-fi TV series, directed by Soumik Sen. The series is produced by Shabinaa Entertainment and Alligator Media Productions. The series stars Prateik Babbar, Sonal Chauhan, Jisshu Sengupta, and Denzil Smith in lead role. It premiered on 22 May 2019, and the show is available on ZEE5.

== Cast ==
- Prateik Babbar as Chandrashekhar
- Sonal Chauhan as Meenakshi Pirzada
- Jishu Sengupta as Harshvardhan Dharma
- Jatin Goswami as Sayyed Ali Hassan
- Amit Kumar as Sandeep Beniwal
- Denzil Smith as Nalini Ranjan Pant

== Release ==
The series was released on 22 May 2019, and it is available on ZEE5.

== Episodes ==
No. overall	No. in season	Title	Directed by	Written by	Original release date
1	1	"Pralay"	Soumik Sen	Suresh Nair and Shreyes Lowlekar	23 April 2019
2	2	"Test Run"	Soumik Sen	Suresh Nair and Shreyes Lowlekar	23 April 2019
3	3	"Trapped"	Soumik Sen	Suresh Nair and Shreyes Lowlekar	23 April 2019
4	4	"Loose Ends"	Soumik Sen	Suresh Nair and Shreyes Lowlekar	23 April 2019
5	5	"Target Down"	Soumik Sen	Suresh Nair and Shreyes Lowlekar	23 April 2019
6	6	"Burn Notice"	Soumik Sen	Suresh Nair and Shreyes Lowlekar	23 April 2019
7	7	"Gut Feeling"	Soumik Sen	Suresh Nair and Shreyes Lowlekar	23 April 2019
8	8	"The Monster"	Soumik Sen	Suresh Nair and Shreyes Lowlekar	23 April 2019
