= Vikramjeet Virk =

Indian actor, model (born 1984)

- Born: 19 July 1984 (age 41); Karnal, Haryana, India
- Education: SD Sen Sec School, Karnal; Delhi University (BA)
- Occupations: Actor; model
- Years active: 2010–present
- Parents: Sukhwant Singh Virk (father); Harjinder Kaur Virk (mother)
- Website: vikramjeetvirk.com

Vikramjeet Virk is an Indian actor who works in Hindi, Punjabi, Telugu, Malayalam films.

== Early life ==
Virk was born in Karnal, Haryana, India, to a Sikh family of farmers. He completed his schooling from Khasla Senior Secondary School and S. D. Senior Secondary School in Karnal. During his youth, he participated in sports including Kabaddi and Basketball.

== Filmography ==
Key
†	Denotes films that have not yet been released

=== Films ===
Year	Title	Role	Language	Notes
2009	Ek: The Power of One	Special Appearance	Hindi	
2010	Khelein Hum Jee Jaan Sey	Assanullah Khan	Hindi	
2012	Casanovva	Alexi	Malayalam	
2012	Yaraan Naal Baharaan 2	Vikram	Punjabi	
2013	Baadshah	Vikram Bhai	Telugu	
2014	Heart Attack	Makrand Kamati	Telugu	
2014	Bhimavaram Bullodu	Vikram	Telugu	
2015	Rudhramadevi	Mahadeva Nayakudu	Telugu	Nominated—IIFA Utsavam for Best Performance in Negative Role
2015	Sher	Pappi	Telugu	
2016	Dictator	Vicky Bhai	Telugu	
2017	Buddies in India	Bull King	Chinese	
2017	Paisa Vasool	Bob Marley	Telugu	
2018	Amar Akbar Anthony	Vikram Talwar	Telugu	
2019	Drive	Bikki	Hindi	
2019	21: Battle of Saragarhi	Buta Singh	Hindi	
2020	22	David	Telugu	
2020	Ik Sandhu Hunda Si	Kala	Punjabi	
2021	Thana Sadar	Moosa/Pala	Punjabi	Nominated—PTC Punjabi Film Award for Best Performance in Negative Role
2022	Nishana	Gurdish Gola	Punjabi	
2023	Agent	Deva	Telugu	
2023	Nidarr	Zarkhawar Khan	Punjabi	
2023	Mera Baba Nanak	Karanbir	Punjabi	
2023	Maurh	Dogar	Punjabi	
2025	Hari Hara Veera Mallu	Mirza Khan	Telugu	
2026	Mitti De Putt	Jang Singh	Punjabi	Filming

=== Tv & Web Series ===
Year	Title	Role	Language	Notes
2006	Saude Dillan De	Vikram	Punjabi	Channel Punjabi
2008	Chandramukhi	Vikram Singh	Hindi	DD National
2011	Shobha Somnath Ki	Mahmud of Ghazni	Hindi	Zee TV
2012	Jai Jag Janani Maa Durga	Kaalkey	HIndi	Colors
2014	Devon Ke Dev...Mahadev	Banasur	Hindi	Life OK
2014	Box Cricket League	Contestant	Hindi	Sony TV
2014	Maharakshak: Aryan	Triloki	Hindi	Zee TV
2015	Suryaputra Karn	Jarasandh	Hindi	Sony TV
2016	Box Cricket League - Punjab	Team Captain	Punjabi	PTC Punjabi
2024	Karmma Calling	Sameer	Hindi	JioHotstar
2025	Chakravarti Samrat Prithviraj Chauhan	Muhammad Ghori	Hindi	Sony TV
2026	Raja Sahab Returns	Raja Sahab / Surya	Hindi	Kuku TV
