= Fursat (soundtrack) =

Fursat (#ShotonIPhone Original Film Soundtrack)

Soundtrack album by Vishal Bhardwaj
- Released: 3 February 2023
- Studio: Satya, Mumbai
- Genre: Film soundtrack
- Length: 13:56
- Language: Hindi
- Label: VB Music
- Producer: Debarpito Saha

Vishal Bhardwaj chronology
Kuttey (2023)	Fursat (#ShotonIPhone Original Film Soundtrack) (2023)	Charlie Chopra & the Mystery of Solang Valley (2023)

Fursat (#ShotonIPhone Original Film Soundtrack) is the soundtrack to the 2023 musical short film Fursat directed by Vishal Bhardwaj starring Ishaan Khatter, Wamiqa Gabbi and Salman Yusuff Khan. Besides directing, Bhardwaj composed the film's five-song soundtrack with lyrics written by Gulzar. The album was released under the VB Music label on 3 February 2023, coinciding with the short film's premiere, to positive reception and Bhardwaj won the National Film Award for Best Music Direction (non-feature film) for his work.

== Background ==
Fursat was conceived as a musical film which included the song-and-dance format integrated in the screenplay as with Hollywood musical films. Bhardwaj associated with his longtime collaborator Gulzar to write the lyrics, while Shiamak Davar was brought onboard to choreograph the musical sequences.

The soundtrack to the film featured four original compositions, with a reprised version of one of the songs. Besides veteran singers Sukhwinder Singh and Kailash Kher, recording vocals for "Kudiye" (with Hargun Kaur), the soundtrack had three songs performed by the San Diego-based Kiran + Nivi, (Note: a duo consisting of twin sisters Kiran and Nivi Saishankar, also referred to as Sai sisters.) who had recorded three tracks: "Waqt Waqt", "Kal Kahin" and its reprised version. The album was recorded at Bhardwaj's Studio Satya in Mumbai, with spatial audio mastering held at Los Angeles.

== Reception ==
Roktim Rajpai of India Today wrote that "The music, as is often the case with Vishal Bharadwaj's films, proves to be the backbone of Fursat" describing the songs as "hummable". Sana Fazreen of The Indian Express summarized "the songs uplift the story and leave a lasting impression. However, it's Vishal's music, and especially his vocals, that stir the heartstrings of the audience the loudest." Anjum Baba of EastPost wrote "The duo, Gulzar and Bhardwaj, once again creates musical magic with songs worth listening to on repeat mode."

Abhishek Shrivatsava of The Times of India, however, found the songs to be jarring as it was interspersed into the narrative without editing. Karthik Srinivasan, in his weekly review for Milliblog also noted it, while adding that the musical numbers "too seem bloated and labored"; he picked "Kal Kahin" as the standout number from the album, owing to its "soaring melody". Devarsii Ghosh, in his year-ender review for Scroll.in, mentioned "Kal Kahin" as an unconventionally aesthetic number, while Sharanya Kumar of Film Companion also mentioned the album as one of the year's best.

== Track listing ==
Fursat (#ShotonIPhone Original Film Soundtrack) track listing
No.	Title	Singer(s)	Length
1.	"Kal Kahin"	Vishal Bhardwaj, Kiran + Nivi	3:23
2.	"Kal Kahin" (Reprise)	Vishal Bhardwaj, Kiran + Nivi	1:55
3.	"Kudiye"	Sukhwinder Singh, Hargun Kaur	2:42
4.	"Lalkaar"	Kailash Kher	2:41
5.	"Waqt Waqt"	Vishal Bhardwaj, Kiran + Nivi	3:11
Total length:			13:56

== Personnel ==
Album credits

- Music composer: Vishal Bhardwaj
- Lyricist: Gulzar
- Singers: Sukhwinder Singh, Kailash Kher, Hargun Kaur, Kiran + Nivi
- Music producer: Debarpito Saha
- Recorded at: Satya Studio, Mumbai
- Recording engineers: Vishal Bhardwaj, Debarpito Saha
- Recordist: Salman Khan Afridi
- Mixing: Tanay Gajjar at Wow & Flutter Studio, Mumbai
- Immersive mixing: Mike Miller and Jon Castelli at The Atmosphere, Los Angeles
- Mastering: Dale Becker

Musician credits

- Guitar: Debarpito Saha, Mayukh Sarkar
- Snare and strokes: Debarpito Saha
- Chorus: Vishal Bhardwaj, Anant Bhardwaj, Debarpito Saha, Abhishek Jhawar, Haroon Akhtar, Priyansh Srivatsava, Garvit Soni, Nishant Das Adhikari, Manish Sharma, Aviral Kumar, Sanskar Vaidya, Shreya Jadav, Vaibhav Rawal, Chaitanya Shinde, Ajay Tiwari, Sandip Banerjee, Deepti Rege, Archana Gore, Aditi Prabhudesai, Pragati Joshi, Anurag Mishra, Suprit Chakraborty
- Chorus conductor and arranger: Prince Mulla
- Orchestra: Czech National Symphony Orchestra
- Orchestra supervisor: Rita Tulha
- Score transcriptions: Pedro Eugenio de Araujo
- Orchestra producer: Alex Palmer

== Accolades ==
Accolades for Fursat (#ShotonIPhone Original Film Soundtrack)
Year	Award	Category	Result	Ref.
2023	Cannes Lions for Music	Original Composition	Won	
2024	National Film Awards	Best Music Direction (non-feature film)	Won	
