= Lehenga-style sari =

Combination of sari and lehenga choli

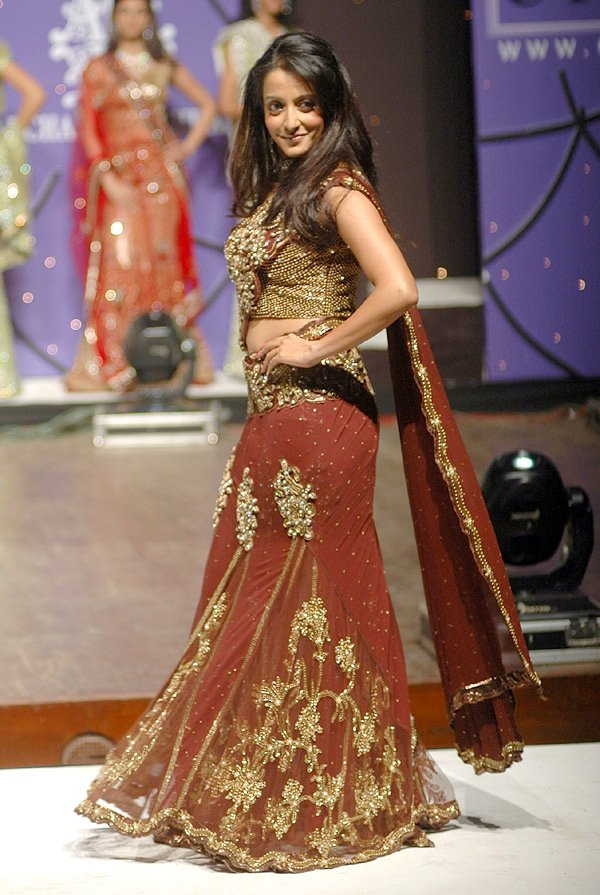
Actress Raima Sen in a lehenga-style sari

A lehenga-style sari is a modern garment introduced in India that blends elements of the traditional sari and lehenga choli. A lehenga-style sari is normally 4.5 metres (5 yards) to 5.5 metres (6 yards) long. To wear one, unlike a sari, one does not have to form pleats but may simply tuck and drape.

Like that of a traditional sari, the lehenga-style sari is worn over a petticoat (inskirt; pavadai or langa in the south, and shaya in eastern India, Lehenga in western India), along with a blouse called the choli, which is the upper garment. The style of choli mostly resembles that of the choli of a conventional lehenga or ghagra choli. Sometimes conventional blouses are also matched with lehenga-style sari. The choli is mostly of a halter neck style, deep neck, or backless style. As with choli worn with the sari, these cholis are also embellished with kundan, beads, mirrors, etc.

== Embroidery and embellishments ==
Various types of embroidery patterns are used for a lehenga-style sari. Bagh, chikan, kashida, kasuti, kantha, sozni, shisha, and zardozi are some of the commonly practiced types of embroidery in the lehenga-style sari.

Bagh is a special kind of embroidery done by women in Punjab to be worn during festivals and weddings. Bagh embroidery completely hides the base fabric and is a very heavy kind of embroidery. Kashida is a Kashmiri embroidery type. This is very colorful and depicts Kashmir in its patterns. The other most famous embroidery on lehenga-style saris is the kantha work and kasuti work of Bangalore.

Embellishments used in lehenga-style saris' patterns include silver embroidery, golden embroidery, metal beads, real pearls, wood beads, glass beads, mirror work, lace work, Kundan, sequins, glittering stones, and zardozi. Mostly rich fabrics like silk, georgette, brasso, brocade, chiffon, crepe, etc., are used in the making of a lehenga-style sari.

== Indian draping a lehenga-style sari ==
Compared with traditional saris, the method of draping a lehenga style is relatively simple and hassle-free. The plain end of the sari is tucked into the petticoat/inskirt and wrapped once completely around the waist, similar to wearing a regular sari. Whereas pleats would be formed in a traditional sari, at this point with the lehenga style one continues to tuck in the drape without making any pleats. (In a lehenga-style sari, pleats are replaced with embellished gotas or panels at the front, which imparts a flared silhouette that is characteristic of a lehenga-style sari.) Finally, the pallu is draped over the shoulder like a regular sari.

The only difference between a lehenga-style sari and a regular sari is that the lehenga-style sari does not require pleats to be formed at the front. A few lehenga-style saris come with side hooks to fit the sari snugly around the waist.
