= Tuloni biya =

Coming of age ceremony for girls among communities in Assam

Tuloni Biya
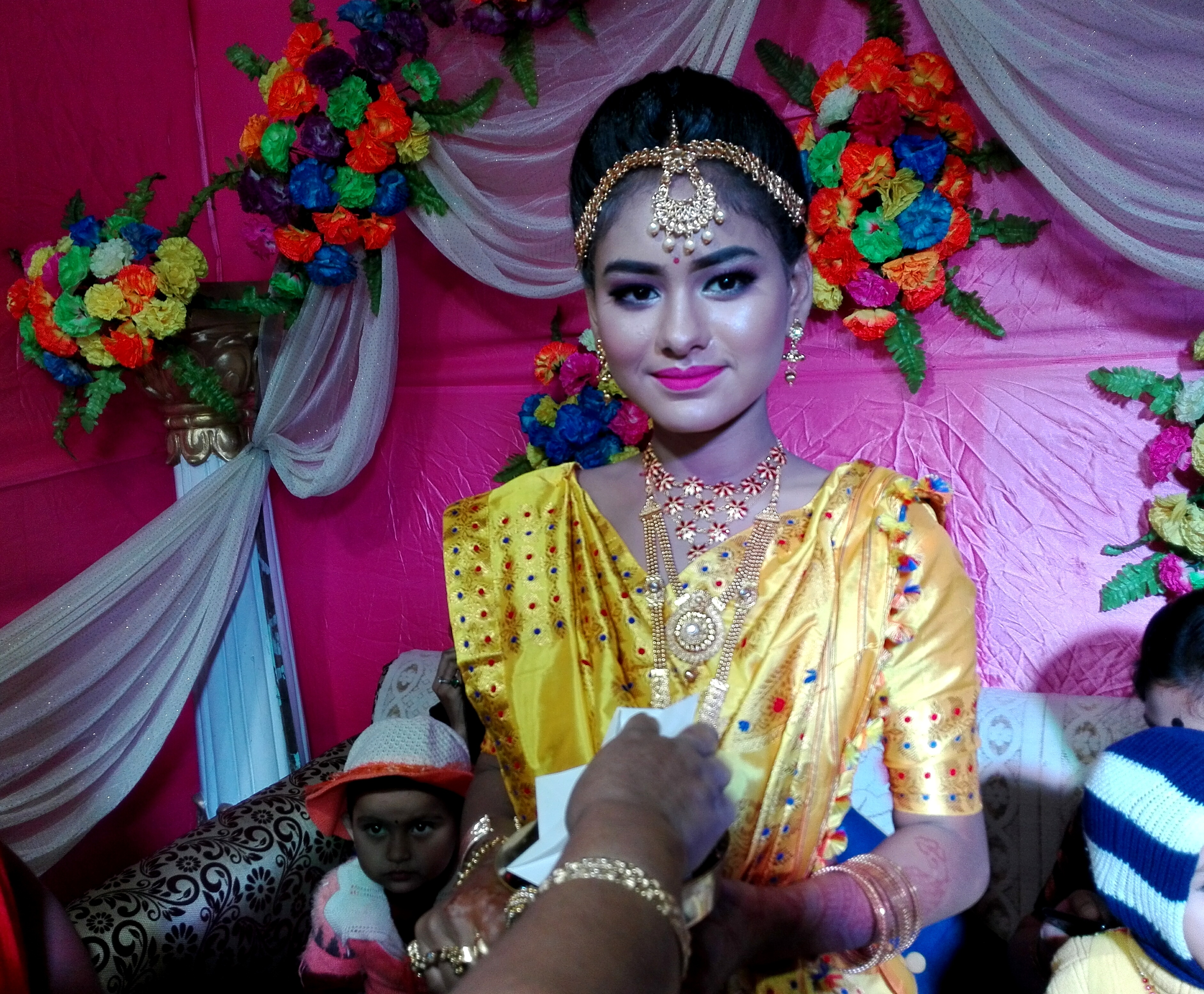
- A young Assamese Hindu girl celebrating Tuloni Biya
- Location: Assam
- Country: India

Tuloni Biya Naam Sung by Two lady

Tuloni biya, also referred to as Xoru Biya, Nua-tuloni, or Santi Biya, is a traditional Assamese Hindu ceremony that marks the attainment of puberty in girls and celebrates the girl's transition from childhood to womanhood. The Tuloni biya, which translates to "small wedding", is accompanied by a multitude of rituals and traditions, all rooted in the concepts of purity and separation.

== Etymology ==
One theory is that the name comes from the Assamese words "tuli" (to lift or raise) and "biya" (marriage). This suggests that Tuloni Biya is a ceremony that marks the girl's transition from childhood to womanhood, and her readiness for marriage.

== Ceremony ==
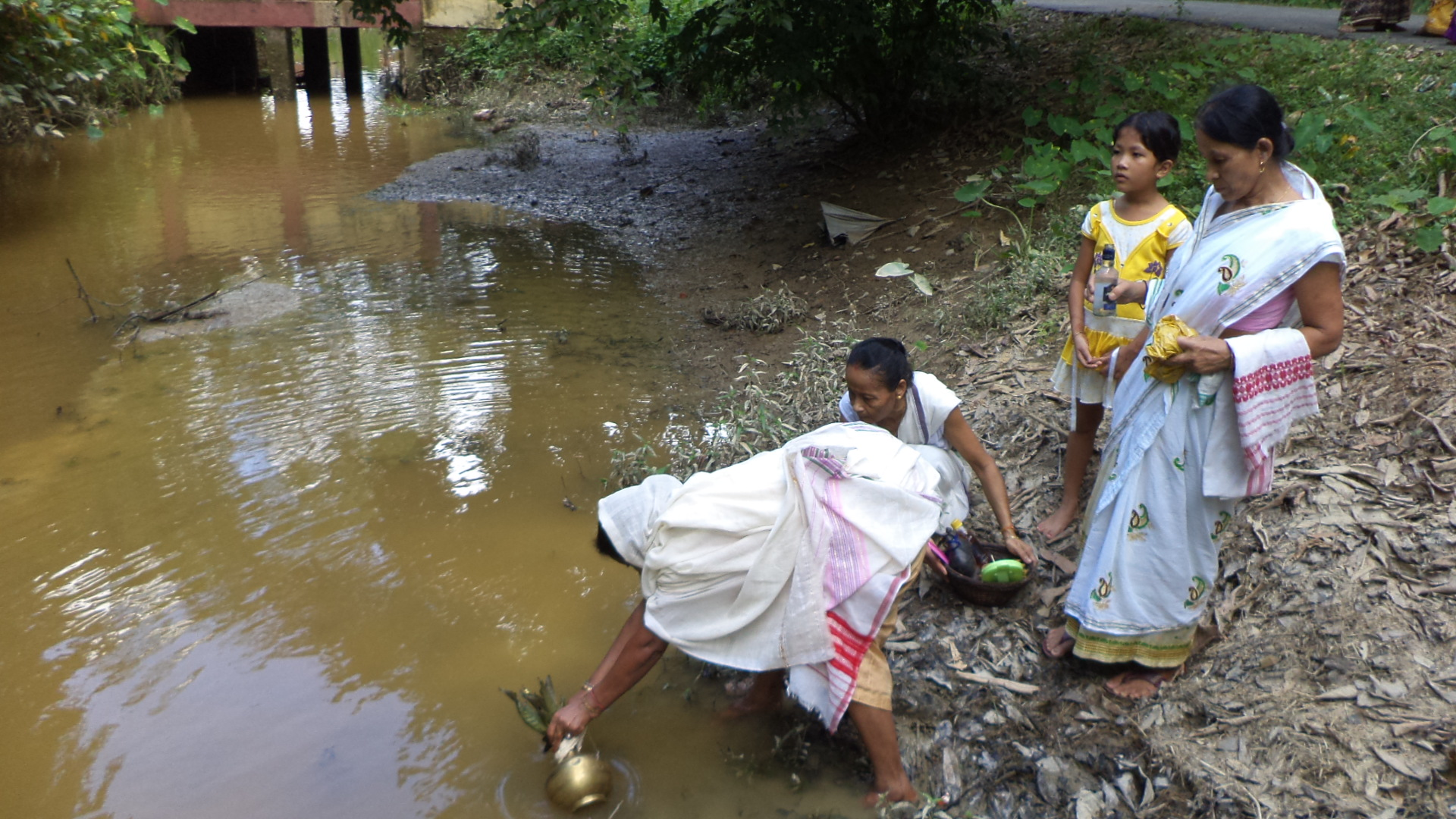
Pani tula ritual.

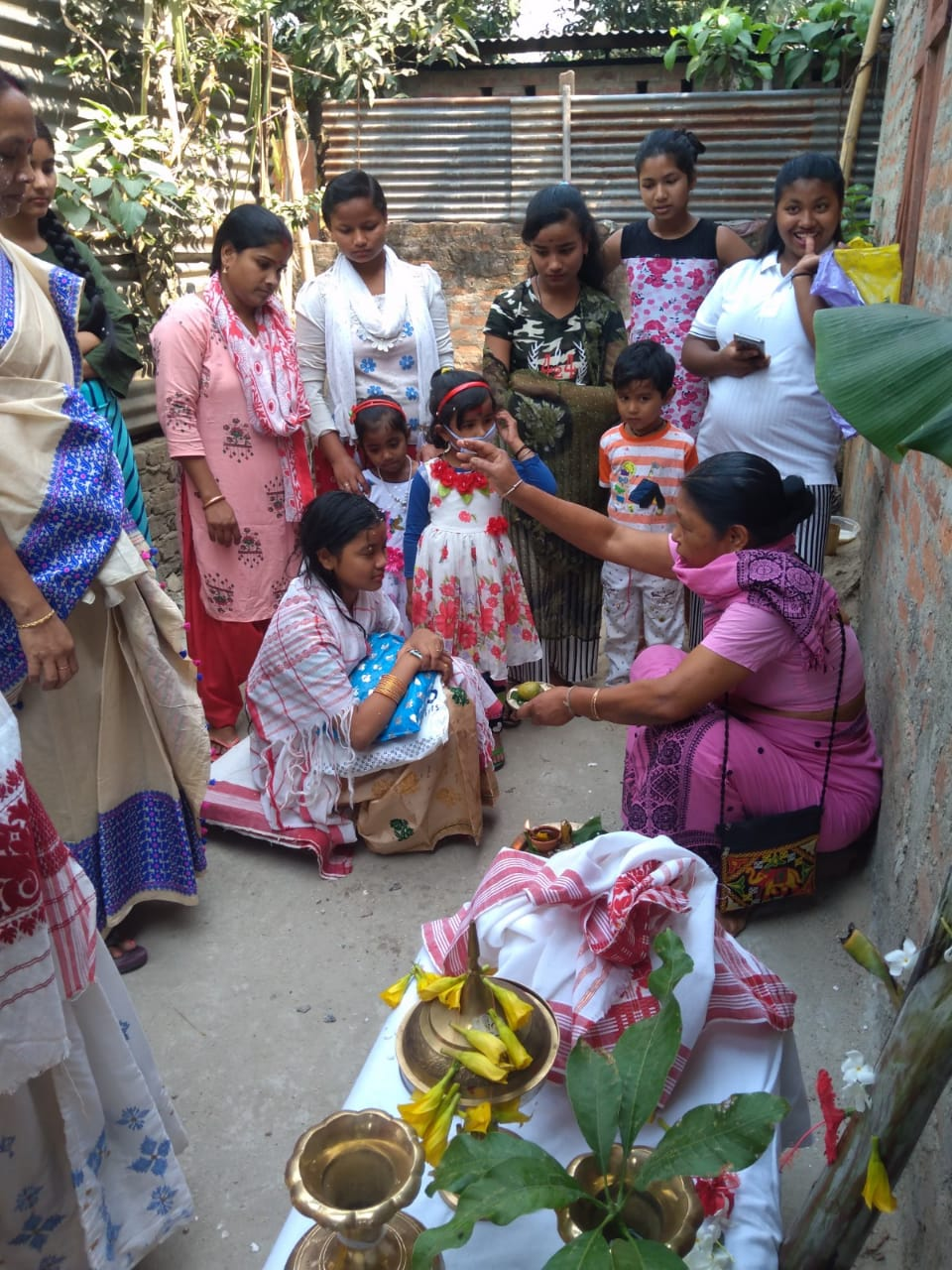
A girl is bathed in Tuloni Biya

The ceremony is typically held seven days after the girl's first menstruation. The family of the girl sends out invitations to loved ones, inviting them to share their blessings and celebrate the beginning of her new life chapter.

The girl is confined to a specific room for the first few days, with all other areas considered off-limits to her. On one day, the ladies of the community preparing for “Pani tula ritual” which means collecting the sacred water for the ceremonial bath, the girl is bathed in sandalwood, adorned in the traditional silk mekhela sador, complemented by the wearing of ornate jewelry for the wedding, and her hair is braided. She is then seated on an elevated platform called the "Vivah Mandap," with family and friends surrounding her.

A priest performs a puja, or religious ceremony, to invoke the blessings of the gods, and the girl is married to a banana tree in a mock wedding. During this event, neighboring families' women gather to sing traditional folk songs, which convey specific teachings to the young girl. The girl is then given gifts of money, jewelry, and clothing.
