= Mayur Puri =

Indian screenwriter and lyricist

- Born: Ajmer, Rajasthan, India
- Occupation: Filmmaker

Mayur Puri is an Indian screenwriter, lyricist, actor and film-maker working in Mumbai. His film songwriting and dialogue work includes Farah Khan-directed films Om Shanti Om (2007), and Happy New Year (2014), as well as the 3D dance franchise ABCD: Any Body Can Dance and ABCD: Any Body Can Dance 2. He directed his first short film, Firdaws, in 2017.

On 17 November 2014, the library of the Academy of Motion Picture Arts & Sciences selected the screenplay for Happy New Year for its permanent Core Collection.

Mayur has also worked on the adaptation and translation of several U.S. films and TV shows into Hindi, including Mowgli: Legend of the Jungle (2018), Pirates of the Caribbean: Dead Men Tell No Tales (2017), Thor: Ragnarok (2017), Maleficent: Mistress of Evil, The Lion King (2019), Avengers: Endgame (2019), Orange Is The New Black (2013–19), Jojo Rabbit (2019), Spies in Disguise (2019), and Locke and Key (2020).

== Early life ==
Mayur was born in Ahmedabad, Gujarat, where he completed most of his education, earning a master's degree from the University School of Languages and a one-year diploma in dramatics from the Drama Department of Gujarat College.

== Career ==
He spent his early years writing and directing for local theatre and television, before moving from Ahmedabad to Mumbai in late 1999, where he began working as chief assistant director to Sanjay Gadhvi at Yash Raj Films. They worked on three films together: Tere Liye, Mere Yaar Ki Shaadi Hai (2002; Mayur's first as a screenwriter), and Dhoom (2004). During his first year in Mumbai, he also wrote and starred as the lead in a Gujarati play, Amastaa Amastaa (2001).

In 2004, Mayur left Yash Raj Films to work as an independent screenwriter and lyricist. His first film as an independent was My Name is Anthony Gonsalves (2008), an adaptation of Julius Caesar. His breakthrough as a screenwriter was Om Shanti Om (2007), from which several phrases entered the film-quote lexicon.

Puri was the creative director for the animation film Jumbo (2008) produced by Percept Picture Company, and co-wrote Blue (2009), the first Indian film to be shot extensively underwater. He then wrote the script for Prince (2010), in which he also appeared in a supporting role.

In 2009, Mayur took a sabbatical from Bollywood; in 2010, he founded Story Circus, a theatre production group that creates live theatre and storytelling productions for educational institutions and other clients, and in 2011, he founded FilmGoa, a joint initiative with Goa University which provides training and job support to aspiring film-makers and facilitates film making in Goa. Mayur's next Bollywood project was Remo D'Souza's directorial debut F.A.L.T.U (2011), the script and screenplay for which he had written a few years previously.

Through his Story Circus project, Mayur reconnected with director Farah Khan, whose children were attending one of the workshops, and began working on the script for her next project Happy New Year. Around the same time, he began working with composer Pritam on songs for Race 2 (2013) and I Love New Year (2013). "Be Intehaan" from Race 2 was later ranked as the 7th most romantic song of 2013, according to a poll in The Times of India. By 2012, Mayur had returned to full-time writing, contributing additional dialogue and lyrics for Remo D'Souza's next musical ABCD: Any Body Can Dance (2013).

Happy New Year was released in 2014, with a script written by Mayur. On 17 November 2014, the library of the Academy of Motion Picture Arts & Sciences selected the screenplay for Happy New Year for its permanent Core Collection. He also worked on the script and song lyrics for ABCD: Any Body Can Dance 2 (2015), and provided lyrics for films including Humshakals, Entertainment (2014), Kick (2014), and All is Well (2015).

== Directorial work ==
In 2017, Mayur directed his first short film, Firdaws, which was entered into the official selection at a number of festivals, winning a number of awards.

== Awards and nominations ==
Award	Year	Film	Category	Result
Filmfare Awards	2008	Om Shanti Om	Best Dialogue	Nominated
Li'l Star Awards	2008	Om Shanti Om	Best Dialogue	Won
German Public Bollywood Awards	2008	Om Shanti Om	Best Dialogue	Won
Star Screen Awards	2009	Singh Is Kinng	Best Lyrics – Teri Ore	Nominated
Star Guild Awards	2014	Race 2	Best Lyrics – Beintehaan	Nominated
Mirchi Music Awards	2016	ABCD 2	Best Lyrics – Chunar	Nominated
Feel The Reel International Film Festival	2017	Firdaws	3rd Best of the Fest Award	Won
Feel The Reel International Film Festival	2017	Firdaws	Audience Award	Won
Feel The Reel International Film Festival	2017	Firdaws	Best Screenplay	Nominated
Roma Cinema DOC	2017	Firdaws	Best International Short Film	Nominated
Baretower Forge World Film Competition	2017	Firdaws	Best Plot Development - Runner Up	Won
Los Angeles Film Awards	2017	Firdaws	Best Fantasy Film	Won
Festigious International Film Festival	2017	Firdaws	Best Fantasy Film	Won
Los Angeles Independent Film Festival Awards	2017	Firdaws	Best Foreign Film Short	Nominated
Top Shorts	2017	Firdaws	Best Fantasy Film	Won
Auckland International Film Festival	2017	Firdaws	Best Short Film	Nominated
Depth of Field International Film Festival	2017	Firdaws	Best of Show	Won
VOB Film Festival	2017	Firdaws	Shorts	Nominated
Top Indie Film Awards	2018	Firdaws	Best Original Idea	Won

== Filmography ==
Year	Film	Lyrics	Actor	Director	Dialogue Writer	Assistant Director / Associate Director	Notes
2000	Tere Liye					Yes	First Assistant Director
2002	Mere Yaar Ki Shaadi Hai				Yes	Yes	Chief Assistant Director; Screenplay & Dialogue
2003	Fun2shh... Dudes in the 10th Century	Yes					Lyrics: Dhuan Dhuan
2004	Dhoom					Yes	Associate Director
2005	Chocolate	Yes					Lyrics: Halka Halka, Khalish, Mummy
2005	Garam Masala	Yes					Lyrics: Falak Dekhun
2005	Ek Khiladi Ek Haseena	Yes					Lyrics: Ishq Hai Jhoota, Yaaron
2006	Fight Club – Members Only	Yes			Yes		Additional Dialogue; Lyrics: Ye Khuda, Chhore Ki Baatein, Fight Club
2006	Provoked	Yes					Lyrics: Zindagi (This version of the song Alive was recorded by Shreya Ghoshal but was not featured in the movie or officially released)
2006	Gangster	Yes					Lyrics: Bheegi Bheegi
2006	Pyaar Ke Side Effects	Yes					Lyrics: Tauba Main, Jaane Kya Chahe Mann, Is this love? Dil Tod Ke, Allah Bachaye, Bad Boy
2006	Apna Sapna Money Money	Yes					Lyrics: Paisa Paisa
2006	Naksha	Yes					Lyrics: U and I
2007	Om Shanti Om		Yes		Yes		Dialogue; Role: Gujju Director
2007	Hattrick	Yes					Lyrics: Ek Pal Ne, Rabba Khair Kare, Wicket Bacha
2007	Speed	Yes					Lyrics: Hello, Loving You, Tikhi Tikhi, Wanna Wanna
2007	Dhol	Yes					Lyrics: All Night Long
2008	Singh Is Kinng	Yes					Lyrics: Bas Ek King, Jee Karda, Teri Ore, Talli Hua, Bhootni Ke
2008	My Name Is Anthony Gonsalves				Yes		Story, Screenplay & Dialogue
2008	Love Story 2050				Yes		Dialogue
2008	Kidnap	Yes					Lyrics: Hey Ya, Haan Ji, Mausam, Meri Ek Ada Shola
2008	Jumbo		Yes				Creative Director
2009	Billu	Yes					Lyrics: Love Mera Hit Hit
2009	Blue	Yes			Yes		Dialogue; Lyrics: Aaj Dil Gustakh Hai, Aaj Dil Gustakh Hai (Remix)
2009	Ek: The Power of One	Yes					Lyrics: Bang Bang
2010	Prince		Yes		Yes		Dialogue; Role: P.K.
2010	Toh Baat Pakki!	Yes					Lyrics: Jis Din Mera
2011	F.A.L.T.U				Yes		Dialogue & Screenplay
2011	Hum Tum Shabana	Yes					Lyrics: Kaare Kaare
2011	Double Dhamaal	Yes					Lyrics: Chill Maaro
2011	Tell Me O Kkhuda	Yes			Yes		Dialogue & Screenplay; Lyrics: Someone Somebody, Morchang, Janasheen, Love you Dad
2012	Tere Naal Love Ho Gaya	Yes					Lyrics: Pee Paa, Fann Ban Gayi
2012	Jannat 2	Yes					Lyrics: Jannatein Kahaan
2012	Kyaa Super Kool Hain Hum	Yes					Lyrics: Dil Garden Garden
2012	Ajab Gazabb Love		Yes		Yes		Dialogue & Screenplay; Role: T2
2013	Race 2	Yes					Lyrics: Be-Intehaan, Lat Lag Gayee, Allah Duhaayi Hai
2013	ABCD: Any Body Can Dance	Yes			Yes		Additional Dialogue; Lyrics: Bezubaan, Psycho Re, Sorry Sorry, Chandu Ki GirlFriend, Duhaayi, Kar Ja Ya Mar Ja, Shambhu Sutaya, Sadda Dil Vi Tu
2013	Himmatwala	Yes					Lyrics: Thank God It's Friday
2013	I, Me Aur Main	Yes					Lyrics: Dar-ba-dar
2013	Jayantabhai Ki Luv Story	Yes					Lyrics: Thoda Thoda, Hai Naa
2013	Commando	Yes					Lyrics: Lutt Jawaan, Saawan Bairi, Mungda, Lena Dena
2013	Issaq	Yes					Lyrics: Issaq Tera(Male), Issaq Tera (Duet)
2013	R... Rajkumar	Yes					Lyrics: Saree Ke Fall Sa
2014	Dishkiyaoon	Yes					Lyrics: Mere Type Ka Nahi Hai
2014	Shaadi Ke Side Effects	Yes					Lyrics: Vyah Karke Pachhtaya
2014	Humshakals	Yes					Lyrics: Hum Paagal Nahi Hai, Barbaad Raat
2014	It's Entertainment	Yes					Lyrics: Johnny Johnny, Veerey Di Wedding
2014	Kick	Yes					Lyrics: Tu Hi Tu, Tu Hi Tu (Reprise)
2014	Radio Mirchi Song	Yes					Lyrics: Tere Bina Main - Mirchi Song
2014	Finding Fanny	Yes					Lyrics: Shake Your Bootiya
2014	Happy New Year				Yes		Dialogue
2015	Coke Studio	Yes					Lyrics: Sawan Mein
2015	ABCD: Any Body Can Dance 2	Yes			Yes		Dialogue; Lyrics: Bezubaan Phir Se, Bezubaan Phir Se Reprise, Happy Hour, Happy Budday, If You Hold My Hand, Naach Meri Jaan, Tattoo Song, Maayi Teri Chunariya, Hey Gannraya, Vande Mataram
2015	I Love NY	Yes					Lyrics: Gud Nal Ishq, Halki Halki, Aaja Meri Jaan
2015	Bajrangi Bhaijaan	Yes					Lyrics: Selfie, Chicken Song
2015	All Is Well	Yes					Lyrics: Tu Mila De
2015	Baaki Baatein Peene Baad	Yes					Lyrics: Baaki Baatein Peene Baad
2016	Fursat	Yes					Lyrics: Fursat
2016	The Jungle Book	Yes			Yes		Hindi Dialogue Hindi Lyrics: Ye Zarooratein (Bare Necessities:Hindi), Tujhsa Banoo (I wanna be like you:Hindi)
2016	Captain America: Civil War				Yes		Hindi Dialogue
2016	The Angry Birds Movie				Yes		Hindi Dialogue with Taranveer Singh & Akshaye Rathi
2016	Finding Dory	Yes			Yes		Hindi Dialogue Hindi Lyrics: Hum Chaley Ghar (We're Going Home:Hindi), Ghar Wapasi (Migration:Hindi), Tairtey Raho (Just Keep Swimming:Hindi)
2016	Dishoom	Yes					Lyrics: Toh Dhishoom, Janemann Aah
2016	A Flying Jatt	Yes					Lyrics: Bhangra Pa
2016	Moana	Yes			Yes		Hindi Dialogue; Hindi Lyrics: Aagey Aagey (Make Way:Hindi), Manzil Meri (How Far I'll Go:Hindi), Tathastu (You are Welcome:Hindi), Shona (Shiny: Hindi), Tu Hi Hai (Who You Are: Hindi), Avey Avey (Avey Avey: Hindi)
2017	Ek Dafaa	Yes					Lyrics: Ek Dafaa
2017	Raees	Yes					Lyrics: Dhingana
2017	Firdaws	Yes		Yes	Yes		Director; Story, Screenplay & Dialogue; Lyrics: Firdaws (OST)
2017	Pirates of the Caribbean: Dead Men Tell No Tales				Yes		Hindi Dialogue
2017	Thor: Ragnarok				Yes		Hindi Dialogue
2018	Avengers: Infinity War				Yes		Hindi Dialogue
2018	Incredibles 2				Yes		Hindi Dialogue
2018	Ralph Breaks the Internet	Yes					Hindi Lyrics: Slaughter Race, Hindi Lyrics: Superstar
2018	Mowgli: Legend of the Jungle				Yes		Hindi Dialogue
2019	Avengers: Endgame				Yes		Hindi Dialogue
2019	The Lion King	Yes			Yes		Hindi Dialogue & Hindi Lyrics
2019	Maleficent: Mistress of Evil				Yes		Hindi Dialogue
2019	Hona Chaida - Arjun Kanungo	Yes					Lyrics
2019	Orange Is The New Black: All Seasons				Yes		Hindi Dialogue for Netflix India
2019	Jojo Rabbit				Yes		Hindi Dialogue
2020	Spies In Disguise				Yes		Hindi Dialogue for Netflix India
2020	Locke & Key				Yes		Hindi Dialogue for Netflix India
2020	My Neighbor Totoro				Yes		Hindi Dialogue for Netflix India
2020	Kiki's Delivery Service				Yes		Hindi Dialogue for Netflix India
2020	Ponyo				Yes		Hindi Dialogue for Netflix India
2020	Mira - Royal Detective				Yes		Hindi Dialogue for Netflix India
2020	The Willoughbys				Yes		Hindi Dialogue for Netflix India
2020	Here We Are				Yes		Hindi Dialogue for Netflix India
2021	Shang-Chi and the Legend of the Ten Rings				Yes		Hindi Dialogue
2022	Doctor Strange in the Multiverse of Madness				Yes		Hindi Dialogue
2022	Thor: Love and Thunder				Yes		Hindi Dialogue
2022	Titu Ambani	Yes					Lyrics: Jabre Piya, Mr. Malang, Haq Tumko Hi, Badal Gaye Tum
2022	Atithi Bhooto Bhava	Yes					Lyrics: "Raat Kawari Hai"
2022	Middle Class Love	Yes					Lyrics: "Hypnotize"
2022	Avatar: The Way of Water				Yes		Hindi Dialogue
2023	Shehzada	Yes					Lyrics: "Shehzada Title Track"
2023	Chatrapathi	Yes					Lyrics: "Bareilly Ki Bazaar"
2024	Deadpool & Wolverine				Yes		Hindi Dialogue
2024	Mufasa: The Lion King	Yes			Yes		Hindi Dialogue and lyrics
2025	Badass Ravi Kumar	Yes					Lyrics: "Dil Ke Taj Mahal Mein"
2025	Metro... In Dino	Yes					Lyricis: Dhaagena Tinak Dhin
