= Sonal Chauhan =

Indian actress (born c. 1985/1987)

- Chauhan in 2024
- Born: 16 May 1985 (age 41) or 16 May 1987 (age 39); Bulandshahr or Agra, Uttar Pradesh, India
- Education: Gargi College
- Occupations: Model; actress; singer
- Years active: 2005–present
- Title: Femina Miss India World Tourism 2005; Miss World Tourism 2005

Sonal Chauhan (born 16 May 1985/1987) is an Indian actress, singer and beauty pageant titleholder, who primarily works in Telugu and Hindi films. She won the title of Femina Miss India 2005 and followed it up with winning the Miss World Tourism 2005 title.

In 2008, Chauhan made her acting debut with the Hindi film Jannat, and followed it with her Telugu debut Rainbow, in the same year. Chauhan has since been part of commercially successful films–Cheluveye Ninne Nodalu (2010), Legend (2014), Pandaga Chesko (2015), Size Zero (2015), Dictator (2016) and Mirzapur (2026).

== Early life ==
Chauhan was born in a Rajput family. She attended Delhi Public School in Noida. She then studied Philosophy honours at Gargi College in New Delhi.

== Career ==
Chauhan was crowned Miss World Tourism 2005 at Miri, Sarawak state of Malaysia. She is the first Indian to have claimed the Miss World Tourism title. She also appeared on the cover pages of FHM.

Chauhan at an event in 2018

She first appeared on screen in Himesh Reshammiya's Aap Kaa Surroor. She appeared opposite Emraan Hashmi in her Hindi film debut in Jannat which she would go on to earn a nomination for Best Female Debut from the Filmfare Awards. She has also signed a three-film deal with the Bhatts, of which two are still pending. She also sang a duet with KK for the song "Kaise Bataoon" in the film 3G.

She acted in a Telugu film Legend costarring Nandamuri Balakrishna and marking her comeback to Tollywood. Her next project was Pandaga Chesko opposite Ram Pothineni, which was a box office success. In early 2015, she signed two Telugu films: Size Zero opposite Arya and Sher opposite Nandamuri Kalyan Ram. In 2016, she appeared in the Telugu film, Dictator, which was a commercial success at the box-office.

== Media image ==
Chauhan in 2016

Chauhan has featured in Times 50 Most Desirable Women list several times. She was placed 43rd in 2010, 38th in 2011, 21st in 2012, and 20th in 2013.

== Filmography ==
Key
†	Denotes films that have not yet been released

=== Films ===
Year	Title	Role	Language	Notes
2008	Jannat	Zoya Mathur	Hindi	
2008	Rainbow	Swapna	Telugu	
2010	Cheluveye Ninne Nodalu	Prakruthi	Kannada	
2011	Bbuddah... Hoga Terra Baap	Tanya	Hindi	
2012	Pehla Sitara		Hindi	
2013	3G	Sheena	Hindi	
2014	Legend	Sneha	Telugu	
2015	Pandaga Chesko	Anushka (Sweety)	Telugu	
2015	Sher	Nandini	Telugu	
2015	Size Zero	Simran	Telugu	Bilingual film
2015	Inji Iduppazhagi	Simran	Tamil	Bilingual film
2016	Dictator	Indu	Telugu	
2018	Paltan	Maj. Bishen Singh's wife	Hindi	
2018	Jack and Dil	Shilpa Walia	Hindi	
2019	Ruler	Harika	Telugu	
2021	The Power	Chandini	Hindi	
2022	F3: Fun and Frustration	American girl	Telugu	
2022	The Ghost	Priya	Telugu	
2023	Adipurush	Mandodari	Hindi; Telugu	Bilingual film
2024	Dard	Fatima	Bengali; Hindi	First Bangladeshi and Bengali film; India Bangladesh joint production film; Bilingual film
2026	Shera	Sahiba	Punjabi	
2026	Mirzapur	Mumtaz Bibi	Hindi	

=== Television ===
Year	Title	Role	Ref.
2019	Skyfire	Meenakshi Pirzada	

=== Music videos ===
Year	Title	Singer	Ref.
2006	Samjho Na Kuch To Samjho Na	Himesh Reshammiya	
2016	Fursat	Arjun Kanungo	
2016	Badtameez	Ankit Tiwari	
2018	Kuch Nahi	Jyotica Tangri	
2019	Mere Aas Paas	Yasser Desai, Jyotica Tangri	
2020	Fursat Hai Aaj Bhi	Arjun Kanungo	
2023	Mal Mal	B Praak	

== Discography ==
Year	Film	Song	Co-singer	Ref.
2013	3G	"Kaise Bataaoon"	KK	

== Awards and nominations ==
Year	Award	Category	Film	Result	Ref.
2009	54th Filmfare Awards	Best Female Debut	Jannat	Nominated	
2009	Stardust Awards	Superstar of Tomorrow – Female	Jannat	Nominated	
2012	Stardust Awards	Breakthrough Performance – Female	Bbuddah... Hoga Terra Baap	Nominated	
2016	Zee Telugu Apsara Awards	Rising Star of the Year	Pandaga Chesko & Size Zero	Nominated	
2017	TSR–TV9 National Film Awards	Most Promising Actress	Dictator	Won	

== See also ==
- List of Indian film actresses
