= North India =

Region of India

North India Northern India
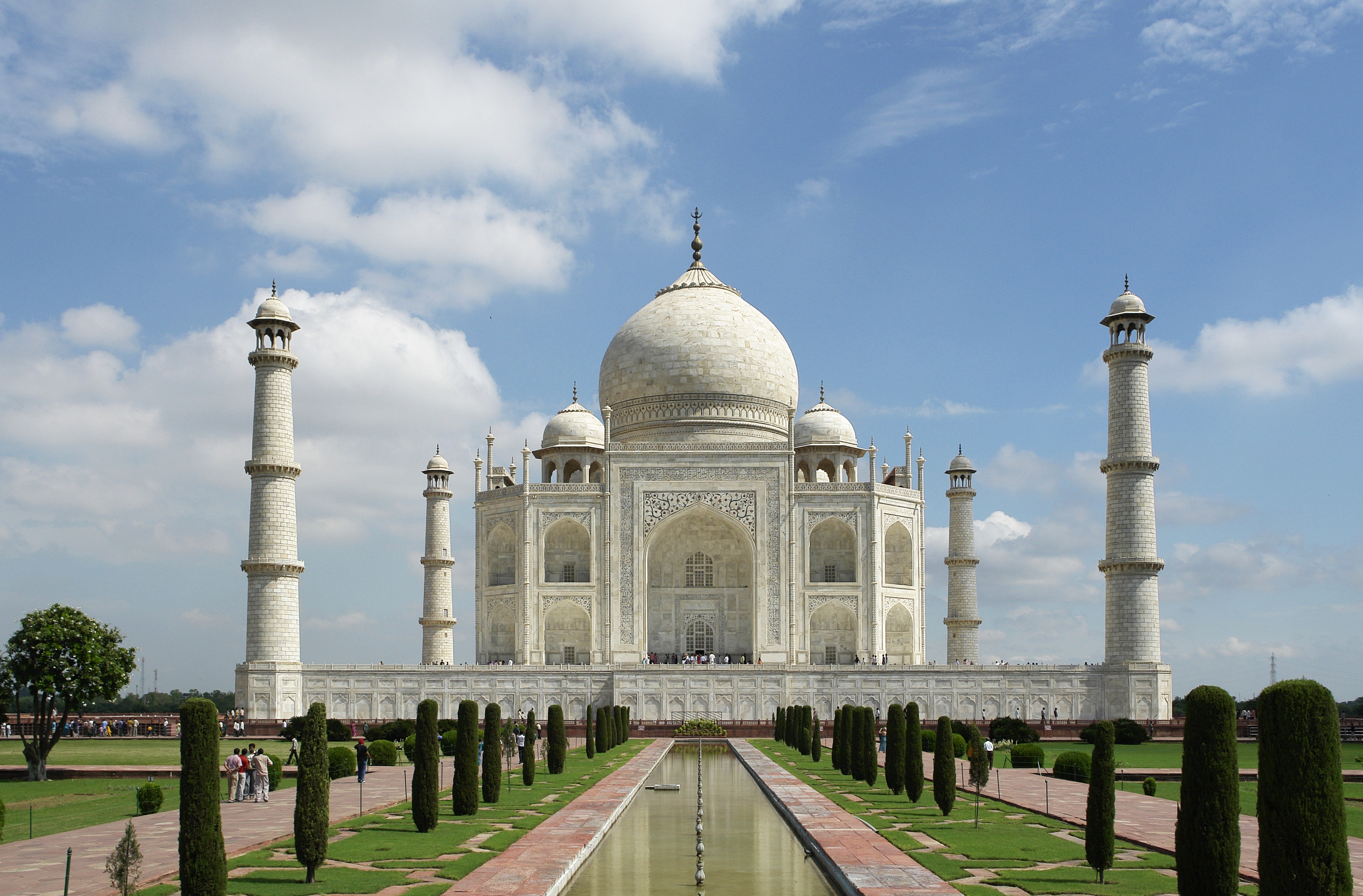
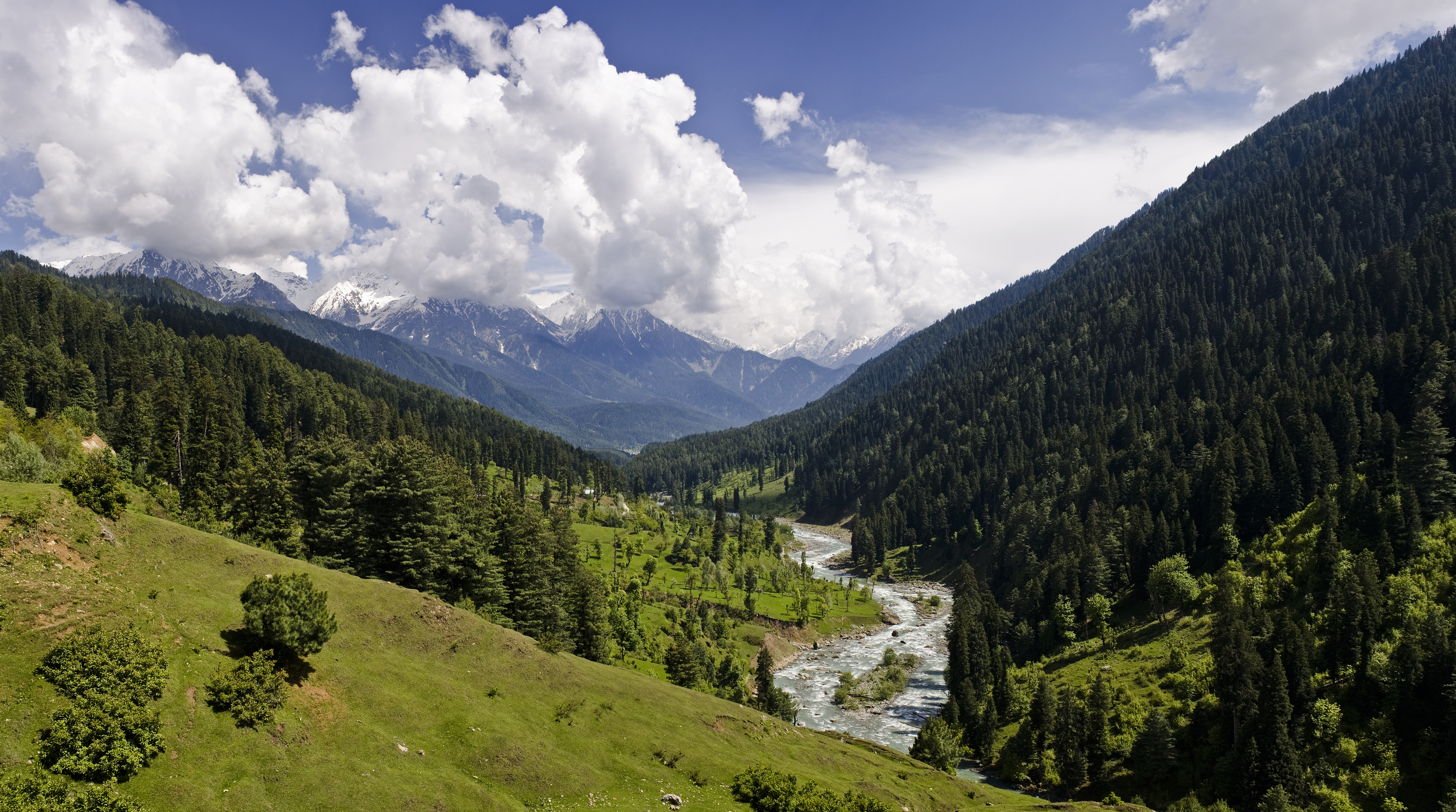
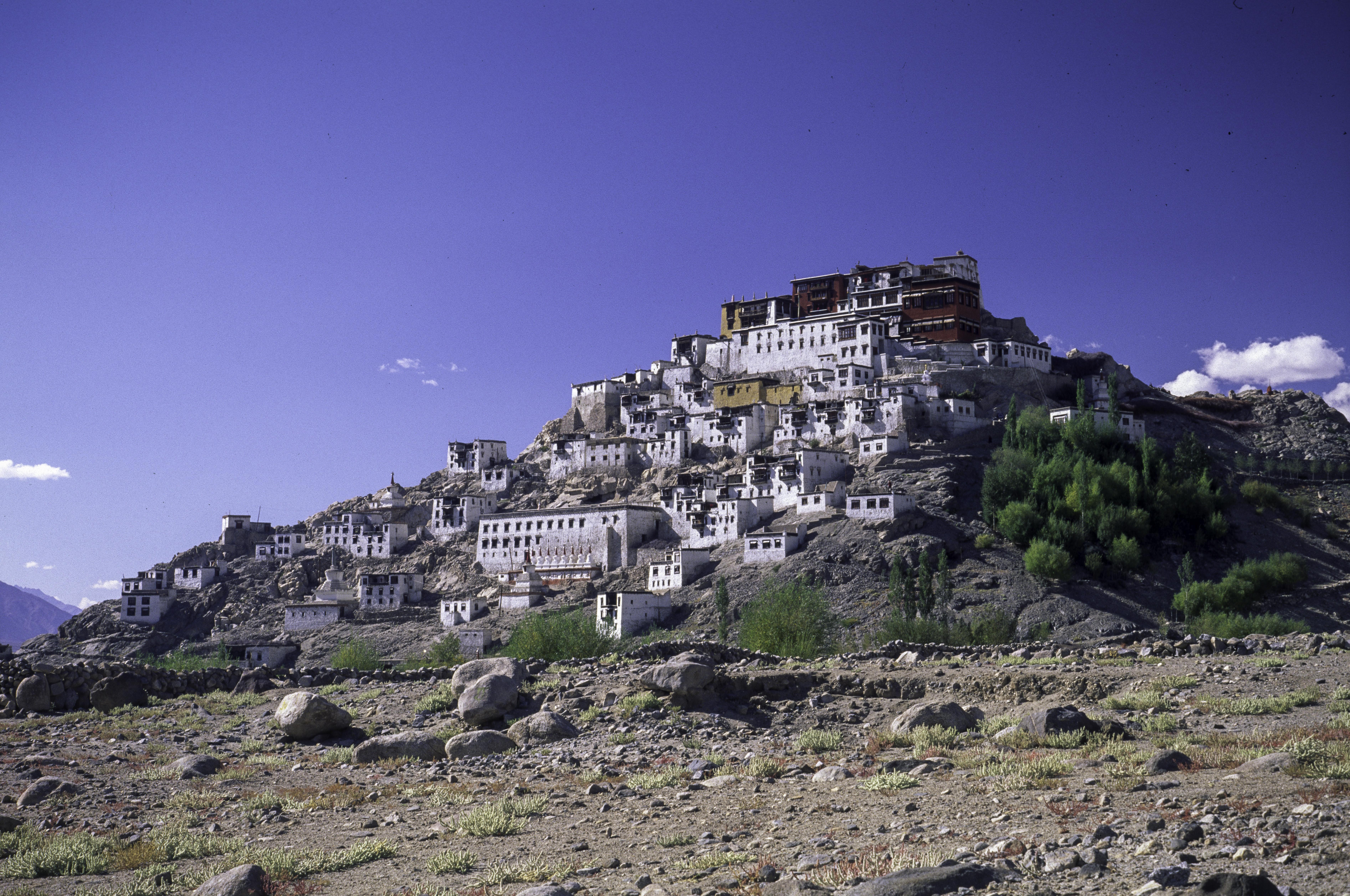
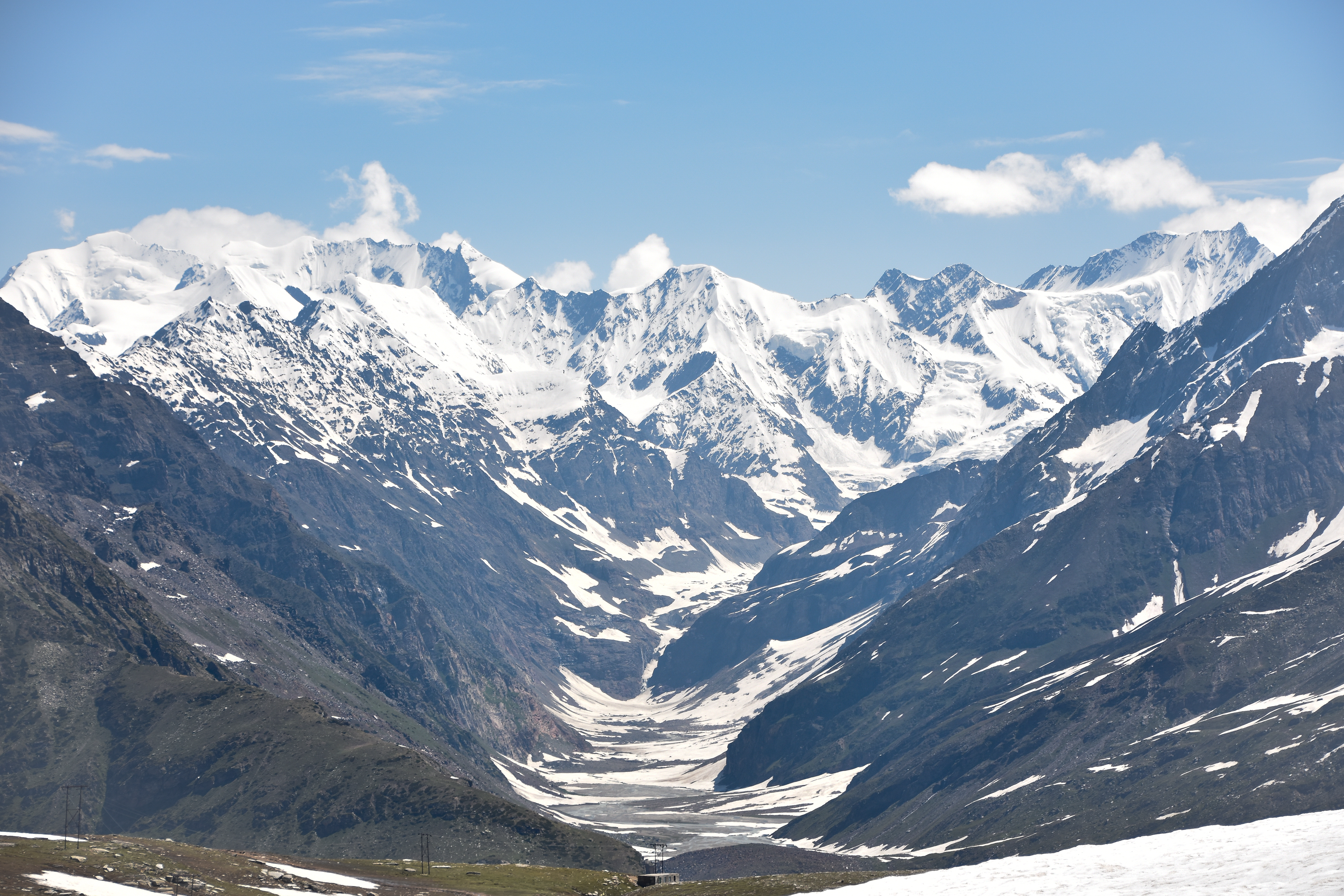
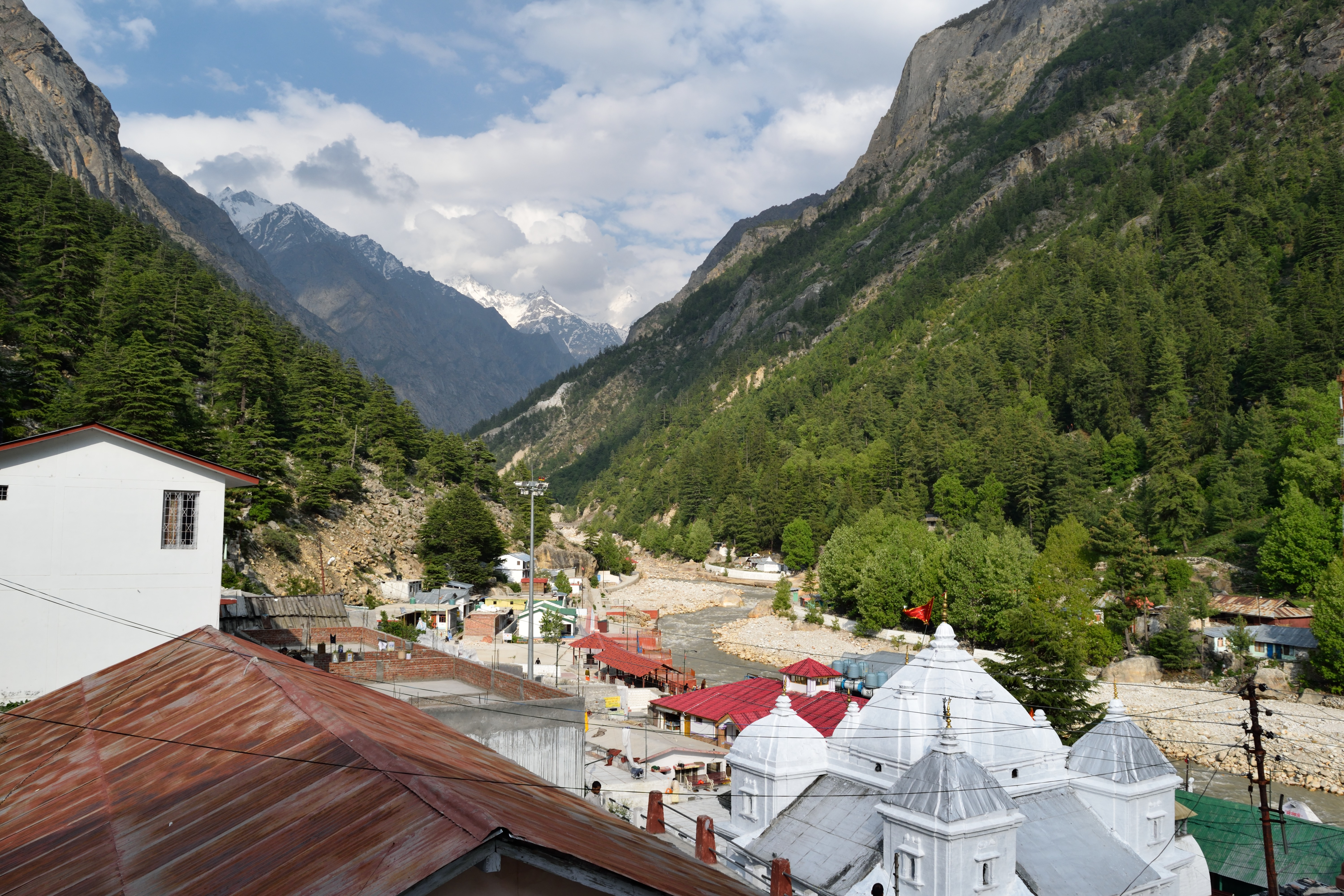
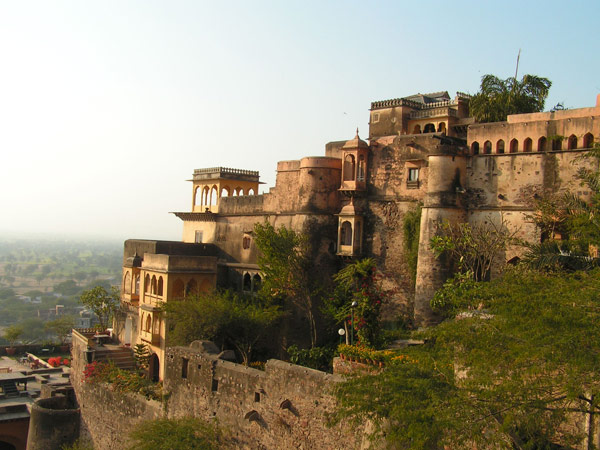
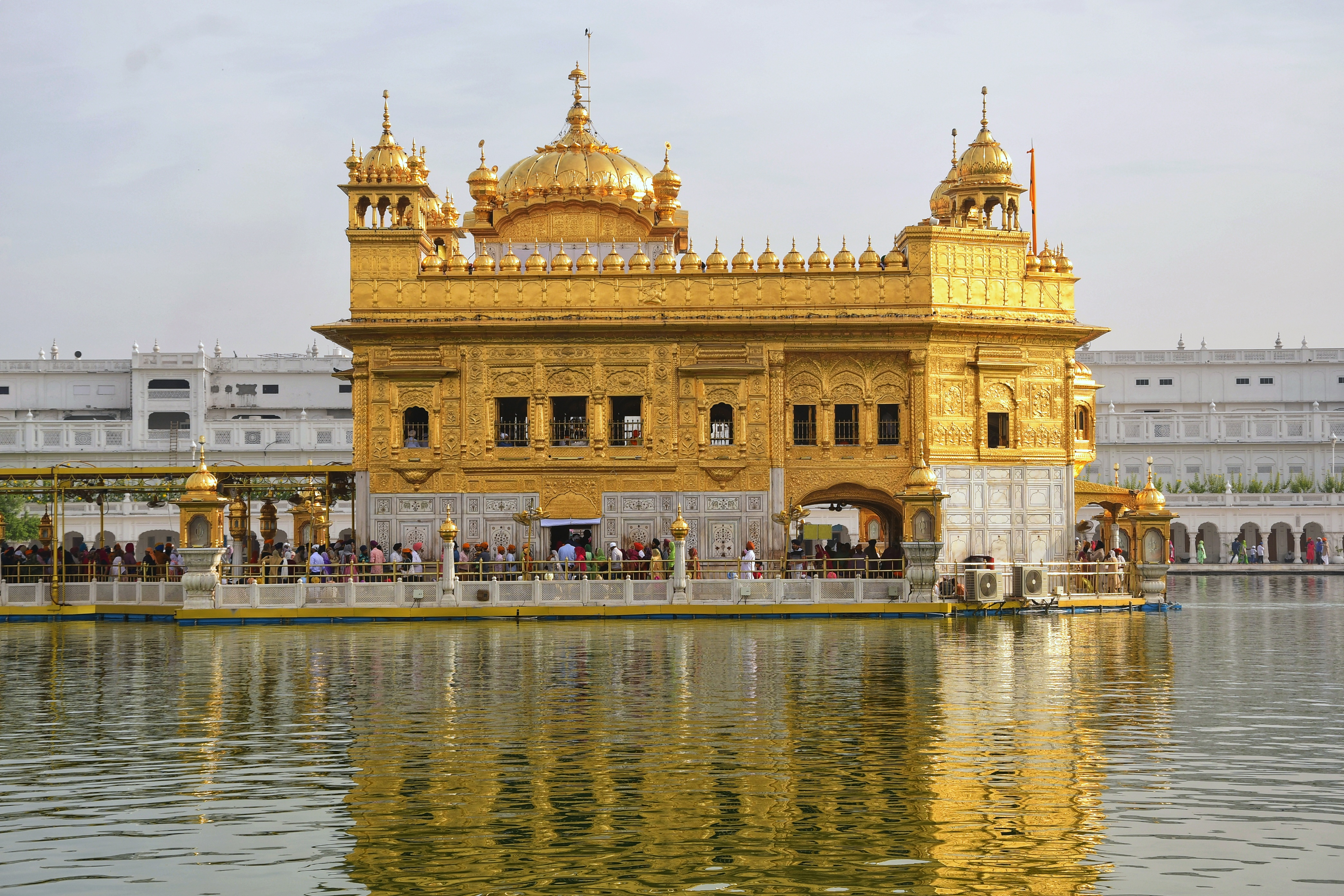
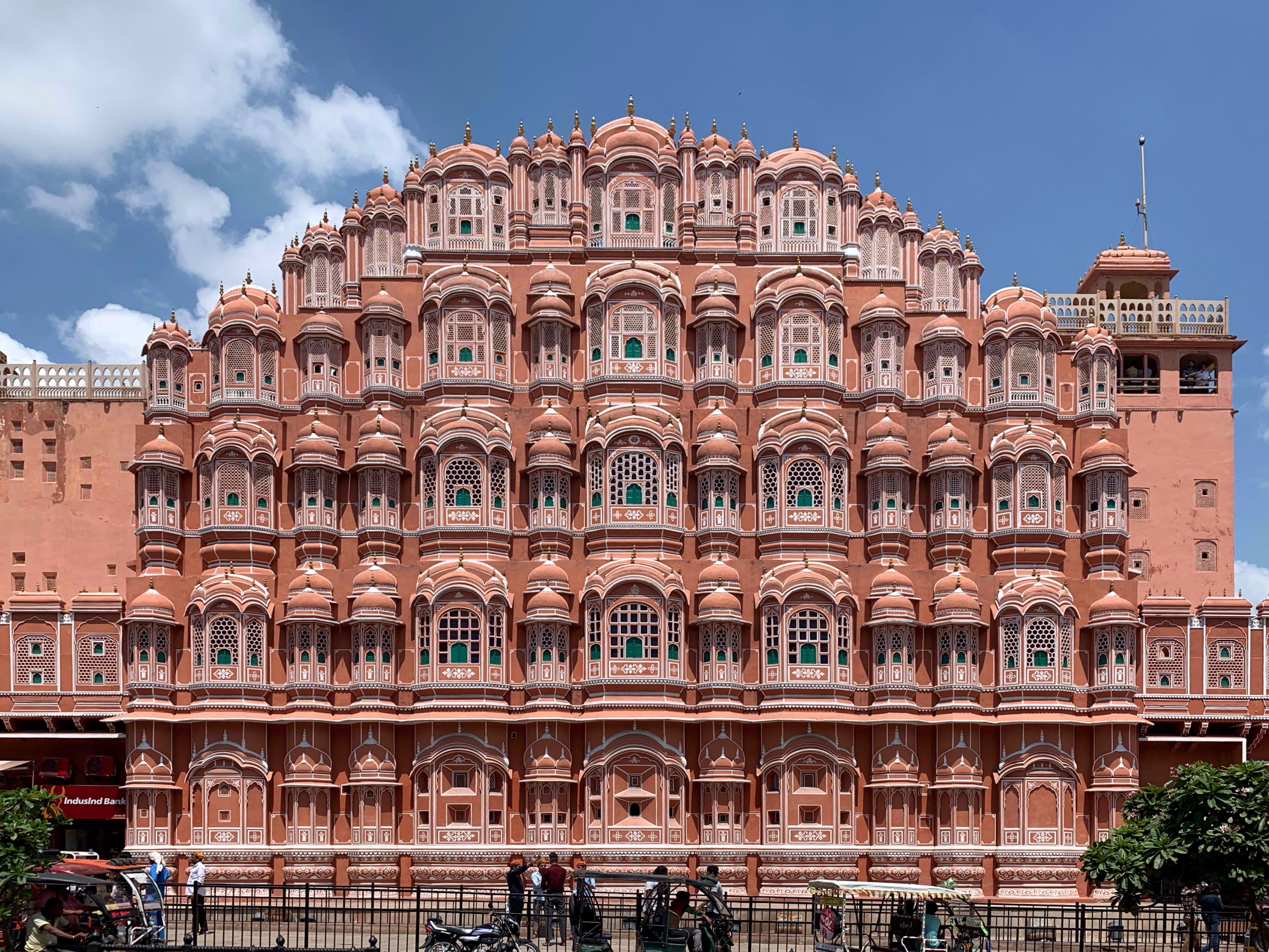
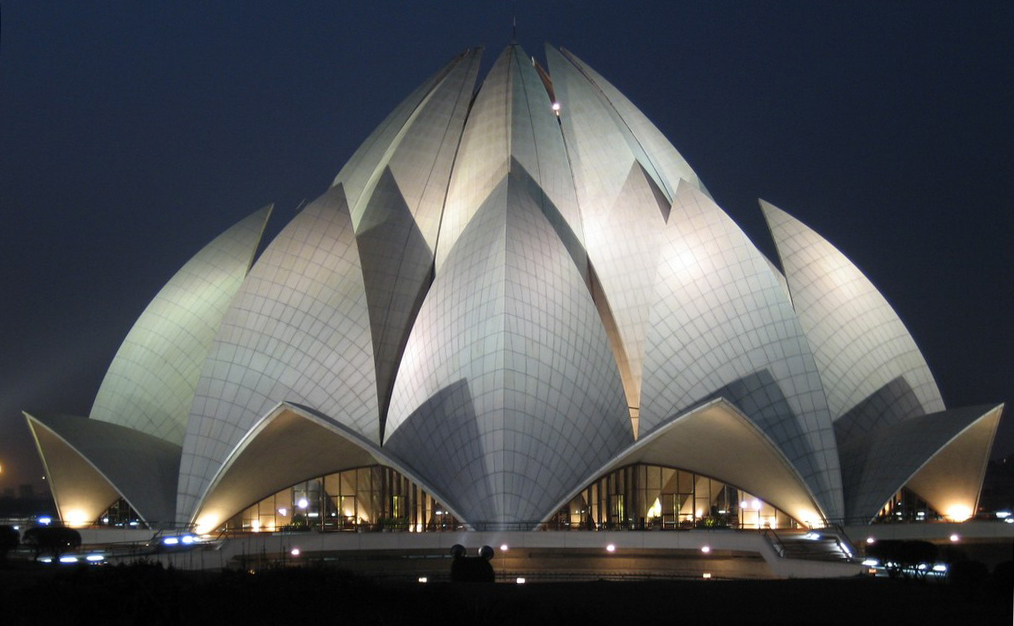
- Taj Mahal (Uttar Pradesh) Lidder Valley (Jammu and Kashmir) Thikse Monastery (Ladakh) Rohtang Pass (Himachal Pradesh) Gangotri (Uttarakhand) Madhogarh Fort (Haryana) The Golden Temple (Punjab) Hawa Mahal (Rajasthan) Lotus Temple (Delhi)

- Broad definition of North India States and union territories commonly referred to as North India
- Country: India
- States and union territories: Chandigarh; Delhi; Haryana; Himachal Pradesh; Jammu and Kashmir; Ladakh; Punjab; Rajasthan; Uttarakhand; Uttar Pradesh
- Most populous cities (2011): Chandigarh: Chandigarh; Delhi: New Delhi; Haryana: Gurgaon; Rohtak; Hisar; Panipat; Karnal; Himachal Pradesh: Shimla; Dharamsala; Solan; Mandi; Palampur; Punjab: Ludhiana; Amritsar; Jalandhar; Patiala; Bathinda; Uttarakhand: Dehradun; Haridwar; Roorkee; Haldwani; Rudrapur; Uttar Pradesh: Kanpur; Lucknow; Ghaziabad; Agra; Meerut

Area
  - Total: 892,126 km^{2} (344,452 sq mi)

Population (2026)
  - Total: 435,601,000
  - Density: 488.273/km^{2} (1,264.62/sq mi)
- Demonyms: North Indian See all demonyms: Awadhi; Bagheli; Brajwasi; Bundeli; Dogra; Garhwali; Haryanvi; Himachali; Kashmiri; Kumaoni; Mahasui; Marwari; Mewari; Punjabi
- Time zone: IST (UTC+05:30)
- Official languages: Dogri; English; Hindi; Kashmiri; Punjabi; Urdu

North India is a geographical region, loosely defined as a cultural region comprising the northern part of India wherein Indo-Aryans (speaking Indo-Aryan languages) form the prominent majority population, while Tibeto-Burmans (speaking Tibeto-Burman languages) form the significant minority population. It extends from the Himalayan mountain range in the north to the Indo-Gangetic Plain, the Thar Desert, till Central Highlands. It occupies nearly two-quarters of the area and population of India and includes one of the three mega cities of India, the national capital of Delhi. In a more specific and administrative sense, North India can also be used to represent the northern Indo-Gangetic Plain within this broader expanse, to the Thar Desert.

Several major rivers flow through the region including the Indus, the Ganges, the Yamuna and the Narmada rivers. North India includes the states of Himachal Pradesh, Uttarakhand, Punjab, Haryana, Rajasthan, Uttar Pradesh, and the union territories of Chandigarh, Delhi, Jammu and Kashmir and Ladakh. Occasionally, states of Western, Central and Eastern India are referred as "North Indian" in a broader term.

The majority of people in North India speak Indo-Aryan languages. The region was the historical centre of the ancient Vedic culture, the Mahajanapadas, the Gupta Empire; the medieval Pratihara dynasty and the Delhi Sultanate; and the modern Mughal India and British Indian Empire, among many others. . It has a diverse culture, and includes the Hindu pilgrimage centres of Char Dham, Haridwar, Varanasi, Vindhyachal, Ayodhya, Mathura, Prayagraj, Vaishno Devi and Pushkar, the Buddhist pilgrimage centres of Sarnath and Kushinagar, the Sikh pilgrimage centre of Golden Temple, Amritsar, as well as world heritage sites such as the Nanda Devi Biosphere Reserve, Khajuraho Temples, Hill Forts of Rajasthan, Jantar Mantar (Jaipur), Qutb Minar, Red Fort, Agra Fort, Fatehpur Sikri and the Taj Mahal. North India's culture developed as a result of interaction between Hindu and Muslim religious traditions.

== Northern Region/Zone ==
States under Northern Zonal Council in orange

The terms 'North Zone,' 'North Region,' or 'Northern Cultural Zone' are used by various ministries of the Government of India to refer to the northernmost administrative division of the country, whether one of four or six. These terms are distinct from 'North India,' which refers to a much larger geo-cultural region.

=== Government of India definitions ===
The Northern Zonal Council is one of the advisory councils, created in 1956 by the States Reorganisation Act to foster interstate co-operation under the Ministry of Home Affairs, which included the states of Chandigarh, Delhi, Haryana, Himachal Pradesh, Jammu and Kashmir, Ladakh, Punjab and Rajasthan.

The Ministry of Culture established the North Culture Zone in Patiala, Punjab on 23 March 1985. It differs from the North Zonal Council in its inclusion of Uttarakhand and the omission of Delhi.

The Geological Survey of India (part of the Ministry of Mines) in its Northern Region, included Uttar Pradesh and Delhi, but excluded Rajasthan and Chandigarh, with a regional headquarters in Lucknow.

=== Colloquial definitions of Northern Region/Zone ===
==== Indian press definition ====
The Hindu newspaper puts Bihar, Delhi and Uttar Pradesh related articles on its North pages. Articles in the Indian press have included the states of Bihar, Gujarat, Jharkhand, Madhya Pradesh, and West Bengal in North as well.

==== Latitude-based definition ====
The Tropic of Cancer, which divides the temperate zone from the tropical zone in the Northern Hemisphere, runs through India, and could theoretically be regarded as a geographical dividing line in the country. Indian states that are entirely above the Tropic of Cancer are Himachal Pradesh, Punjab, Haryana, Delhi, Uttarakhand, Uttar Pradesh and Bihar and most of North East Indian states. However that definition would also include major parts of Rajasthan, Madhya Pradesh, Jharkhand and West Bengal and minor regions of Chhattisgarh and Gujarat.

==== Anecdotal usage ====
In Maharashtra, the term "North Indian" is sometimes used to describe migrants from Uttar Pradesh and Bihar, often using the term bhaiya (which literally means 'elder brother') along with it in a derogatory sense. However within Uttar Pradesh (literally meaning "North Province" in Hindi) itself, "the cultural divide between the east and the west is considerable, with the purabiyas (easterners) often being clubbed with Biharis in the perception of the westerners." The Government of Bihar official site places the state in the eastern part of India. Uttar Pradesh and Bihar are often considered as being a part of north India, however, within most modern definitions of North India, Bihar is not included.

== History ==
=== Ancient era ===
By 55,000 years ago, the first modern humans, or Homo sapiens, had arrived on the Indian subcontinent from Africa, where they had earlier evolved. The earliest known modern human remains in South Asia date to about 30,000 years ago. After 6500 BC, evidence for domestication of food crops and animals, construction of permanent structures, and storage of agricultural surplus appeared in Mehrgarh and other sites in Balochistan, Pakistan. These gradually developed into the Indus Valley Civilisation, the first urban culture in South Asia, which flourished during 2500–1900 BC northwestern Indian subcontinent. Among its urban centres, Kalibangan (in Rajasthan) and Rakhigarhi (in Haryana) were prominent. These cities participated in a complex system of urban planning, long-distance trade, and craft production, sustained through a variety of subsistence strategies.

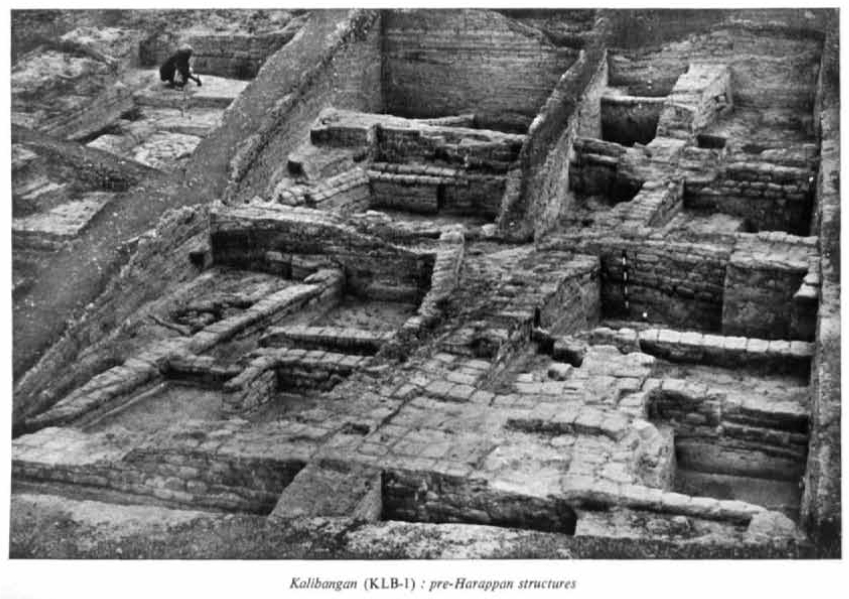
Urban planning and fire altars at Kalibangan reflect Harappan-era religious and civic life in northwestern India.

Between 2000 BC and 1500 BC, several waves of Indo-Aryan migrations from Central Asia occurred and these migrants settled in the Indo-Gangetic Plain. The Vedas, the oldest scriptures associated with Hinduism, were composed during this period, and historians have analysed these to posit a Vedic culture in the Punjab region and the upper Gangetic Plain. During the period 2000–500 BCE, many regions of the subcontinent transitioned from the Chalcolithic cultures to the Iron Age ones. The caste system, which created a hierarchy of priests (Brahmins), warriors Kshatriyas, and commoners and peasants (Vaishyas and Shudras), and but which excluded certain peoples whose occupations were considered impure, arose during this period.

In the late Vedic period, around the 6th century BCE, the small states and chiefdoms of the Ganges Plain and the north-western regions had consolidated into 16 major oligarchies and monarchies that were known as the mahajanapadas. Among these, Kuru, Panchala, Kosala, and Kashi, all located in present-day Uttar Pradesh and Haryana, figured prominently. The emerging urbanisation gave rise to non-Vedic religious movements, two of which became independent religions. Jainism came into prominence during the life of its exemplar, Mahavira. Buddhism, based on the teachings of Gautama Buddha, attracted followers from all social classes excepting the middle class; chronicling the life of the Buddha was central to the beginnings of recorded history in India. In an age of increasing urban wealth, both religions held up renunciation as an ideal, and both established long-lasting monastic traditions. Notably, cities like Sarnath, Shravasti, and Kushinagar, became closely associated with the life of the Buddha and the early Buddhist sangha.

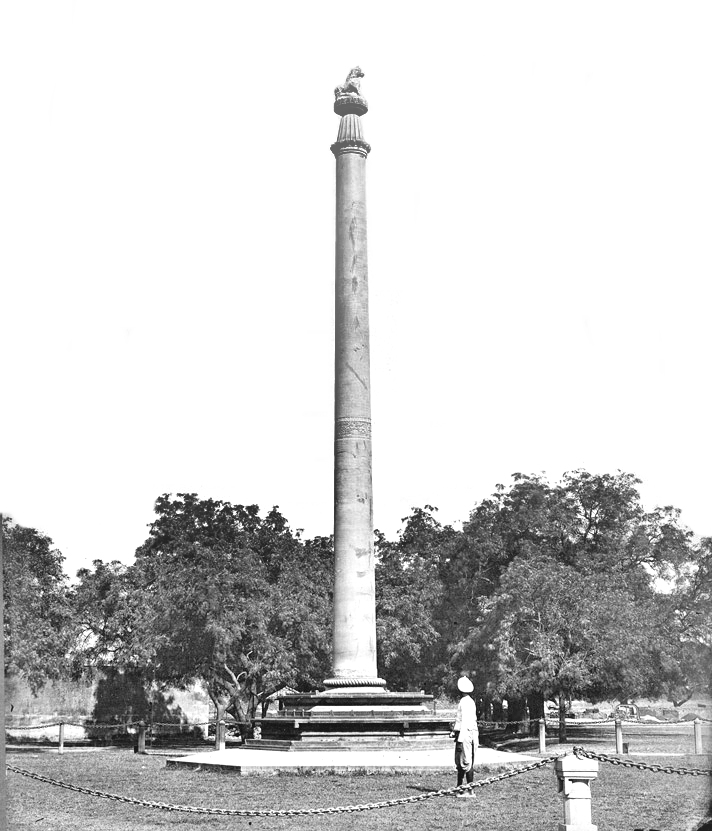
The Ashoka Pillar at Prayagraj also contains inscriptions attributed to the Gupta emperor Samudragupta.

Although the Mauryan capital was located in Pataliputra, cities such as Kaushambi and Prayag in Uttar Pradesh gained prominence as administrative and religious centres. The Magadhan Mauryan emperors are known as much for their empire-building and determined management of public life as for Ashoka's renunciation of militarism and far-flung advocacy of the Buddhist dhamma. Under Ashoka, the spread of Buddhism was institutionalised, and pillar inscriptions appeared across northern India, including sites in Uttar Pradesh and Rajasthan.

By the 4th and 5th centuries, the Gupta Empire had created a complex system of administration and taxation in the greater Ganges Plain; this system became a model for later Indian kingdoms. Under the Guptas, a renewed Hinduism based on devotion, rather than the management of ritual, began to assert itself. This renewal was reflected in a flowering of sculpture and architecture, which found patrons among an urban elite. Classical Sanskrit literature flowered as well, and Indian science, astronomy, medicine, and mathematics made significant advances.

Following the decline of the Guptas, the Indian early medieval age, from 600 to 1200 AD, is defined by regional kingdoms and cultural diversity. When Harsha of Kannauj, who ruled much of the Indo-Gangetic Plain from 606 to 647 CE, attempted to expand southwards, he was defeated by the Chalukya ruler of the Deccan. When his successor attempted to expand eastwards, he was defeated by the Pala king of Bengal. In Rajasthan, a constellation of Rajput clans rose to power, forging new dynasties and asserting martial values through courtly traditions and fortified architecture.

At the same time, the hill regions of Himachal Pradesh and Uttarakhand remained under smaller principalities, shaped by geographic isolation and local cultural traditions. In the plains, cities such as Ajmer, Kannauj, and Varanasi emerged as religious and commercial centres, supported by an expanding temple economy and patronage networks. During this time, pastoral peoples, whose land had been cleared to make way for the growing agricultural economy, were accommodated within caste society, as were new non-traditional ruling classes. The caste system consequently began to show regional differences.

=== Indo-Muslim era ===
After the 10th century, Muslim Central Asian nomadic clans, using swift-horse cavalry and raising vast armies united by ethnicity and religion, repeatedly overran South Asia's north-western plains. A general Qutub-ud-din Aibak declared his independence and established the Sultanate of Delhi in 1206. The sultanate was to control much of North India and to make many forays into South India. Although at first disruptive for the Indian elites, the sultanate largely left its vast non-Muslim subject population to its own laws and customs. By repeatedly repulsing Mongol raiders in the 13th century, the sultanate saved India from the devastation visited on West and Central Asia, setting the scene for centuries of migration of fleeing soldiers, learned men, mystics, traders, artists, and artisans from that region into the subcontinent, thereby creating a syncretic Indo-Islamic culture in the north.

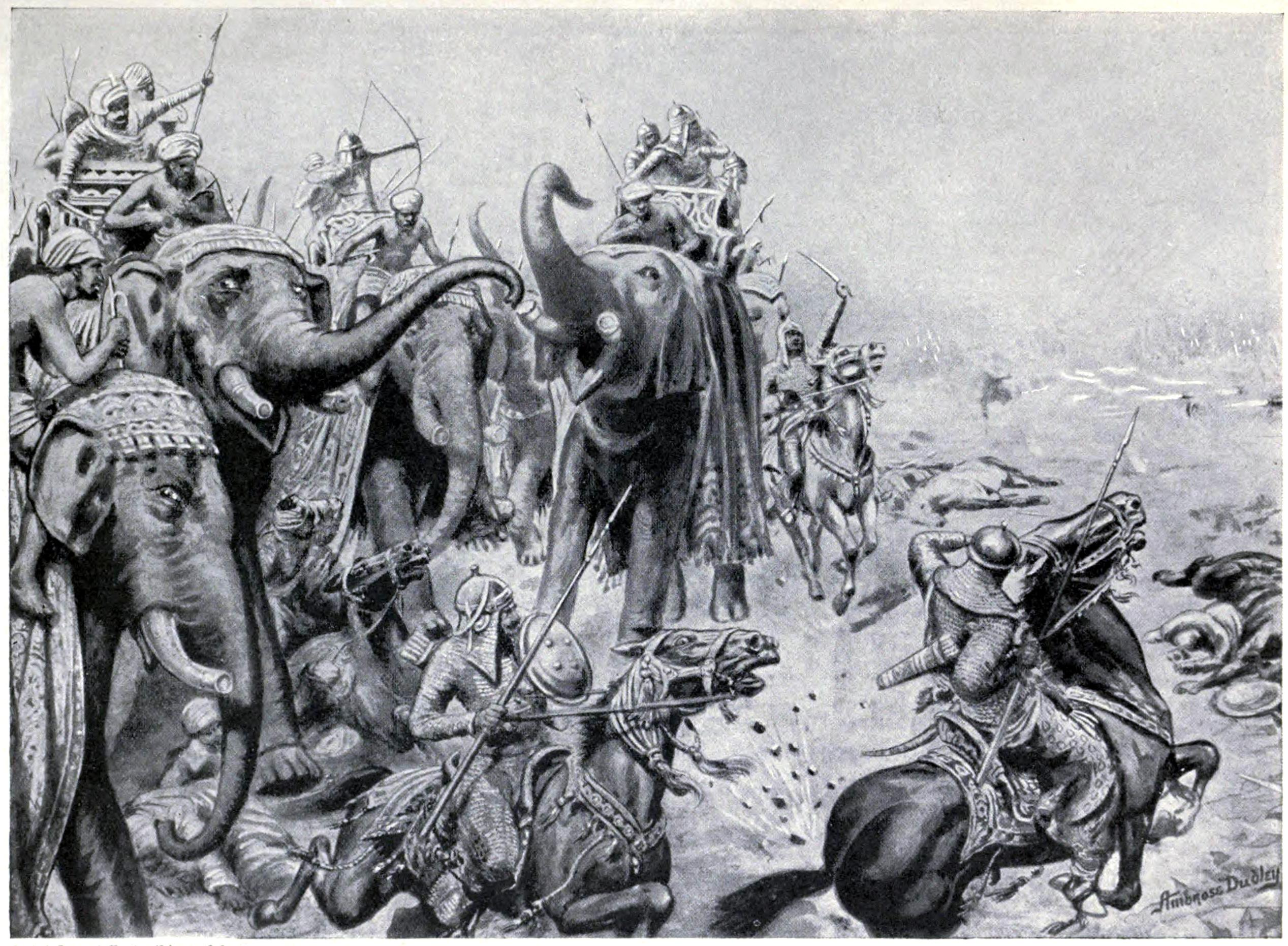
The three Battles of Panipat fought in 1526, 1556, and 1761 were pivotal in shaping the political landscape of North India.

In the early 16th century, northern India, then under mainly Muslim rulers, fell again to the superior mobility and firepower of a new generation of Central Asian warriors. A Turco-Mongol emir, Zahir-ud-din Mohammad "Babur", after defeating the Delhi Sultanate, upgraded himself from Emir and proclaimed himself as the Padishah of Hindustan. His successors were called Mughals or Moguls by European historians owing to the dynasty's Mongol origins. They did not stamp out the local societies it came to rule. Instead, it balanced and pacified them through new administrative practices and diverse and inclusive ruling elites, leading to more systematic, centralised, and uniform rule. Eschewing tribal bonds and Islamic identity, especially under Akbar, the Mughals united their far-flung realms through loyalty, expressed through a Persianised culture, to an emperor who had near-divine status.

The State's economic policies, deriving most revenues from agriculture and mandating that taxes be paid in the well-regulated silver currency, caused peasants and artisans to enter larger markets. The relative peace maintained by the empire during much of the 17th century was a factor in the economic expansion of the region, resulting in greater patronage of painting, literary forms, textiles, and architecture. During this time, religious movements such as Sikhism grew in strength in Punjab, particularly under later Gurus, who adopted a militarised posture in response to growing Mughal intolerance.

=== Modern era ===
By the early 18th century, Mughal authority had weakened. In its place, regional powers in northern and western India, such as the Marathas, the Rajputs, and the Sikhs asserted political control. This fragmentation, coupled with growing European trading influence, created conditions that favoured British expansion. The East India Company, leveraging military superiority and access to local revenue systems, took control of much of North India by the early 19th century. The annexation of Delhi (1803) and Oudh (1856) consolidated British political authority across the region. By this time, with its economic power severely curtailed by the British Parliament and having effectively been made an arm of British administration, the East India Company began more consciously to enter non-economic arenas, including education, social reform, and culture.

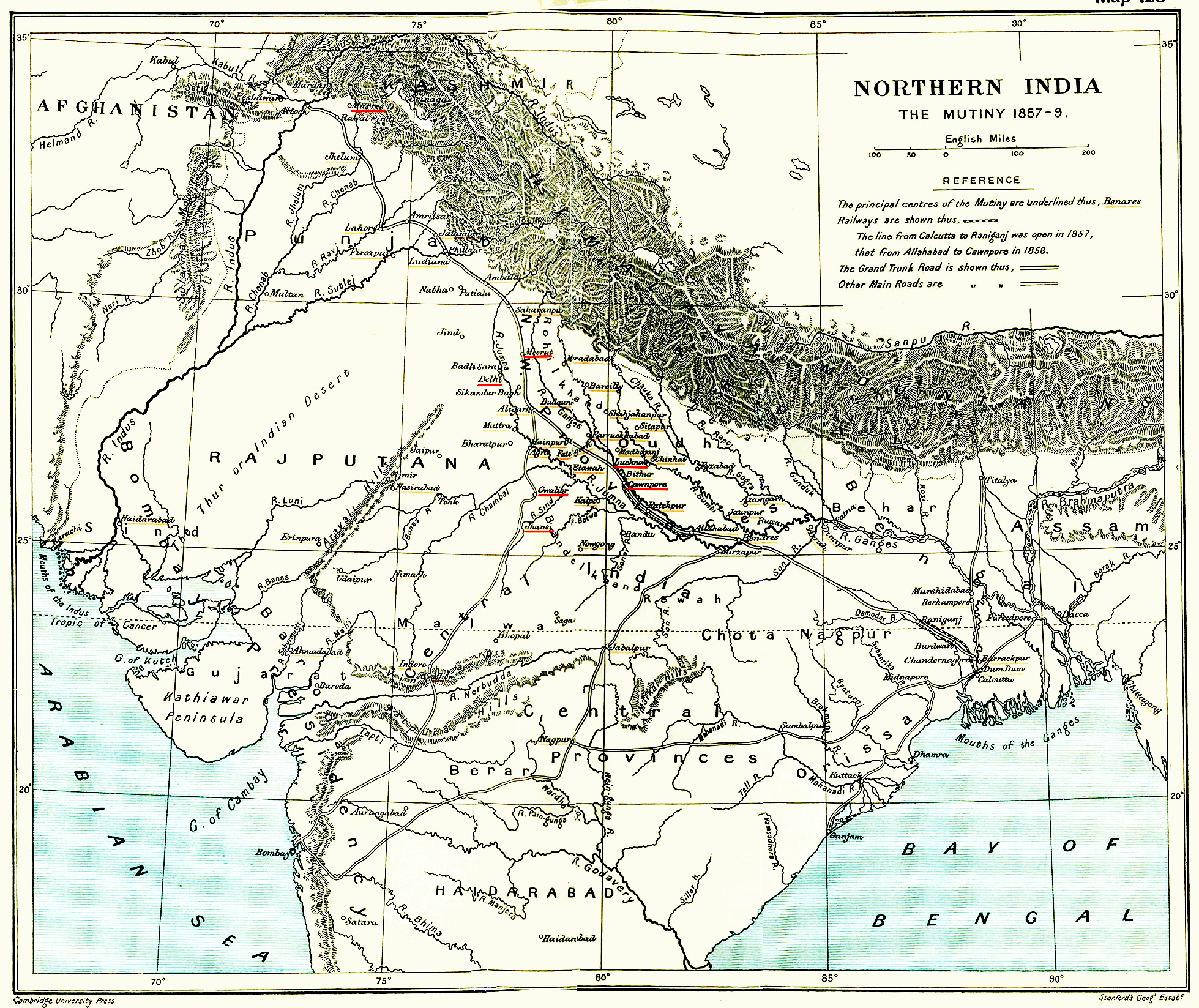
A 1912 map of Northern India, showing the major centres of the Indian Rebellion of 1857

The appointment in 1848 of Lord Dalhousie as Governor General of India set the stage for changes essential to a modern state. These included the consolidation and demarcation of sovereignty, the surveillance of the population, and the education of citizens. Technological changes—among them, railways, canals, and the telegraph—were introduced not long after their introduction in Europe. However, disaffection with the company also grew during this time and set off the Indian Rebellion of 1857. Fed by diverse resentments and perceptions, including invasive British-style social reforms, harsh land taxes, and summary treatment of some rich landowners and princes, the rebellion rocked many regions of northern and central India and shook the foundations of Company rule. This widespread revolt saw intense fighting and significant uprisings in key northern cities like Delhi, Kanpur, Lucknow, Jhansi, and Meerut, which became focal points of resistance against British control.

Although the rebellion was suppressed by 1858, it led to the dissolution of the East India Company and the direct administration of British territories in India by the British Crown. Proclaiming a unitary state and a gradual but limited British-style parliamentary system, the new rulers also protected princes and landed gentry as a feudal safeguard against future unrest. In 1861, a supreme legislature for India was established — the Imperial Legislative Council of India. Further reforms also created a unified bank — the Imperial Bank of India, a police force — the Indian Imperial Police and a unified army — the Imperial Indian Army. In 1876, the Crown-ruled India and the numerous Indian states under the Crown's suzerainty formed a loose political union called the Indian Empire, and Queen Victoria was crowned the Empress of India in 1877. In the decades following, public life gradually emerged all over India, leading eventually to the founding of the Indian National Congress in 1885.

The rush of technology and the commercialisation of agriculture in the second half of the 19th century was marked by economic setbacks, and many small farmers became dependent on the whims of far-away markets. There was an increase in the number of large-scale famines, and, despite the risks of infrastructure development borne by Indian taxpayers, little industrial employment was generated for Indians. There were also salutary effects: commercial cropping, especially in the newly canalled Punjab, led to increased food production for internal consumption. The railway network provided critical famine relief, notably reduced the cost of moving goods, and helped nascent Indian-owned industry. The imperial capital was shifted from Calcutta to Delhi in 1911.

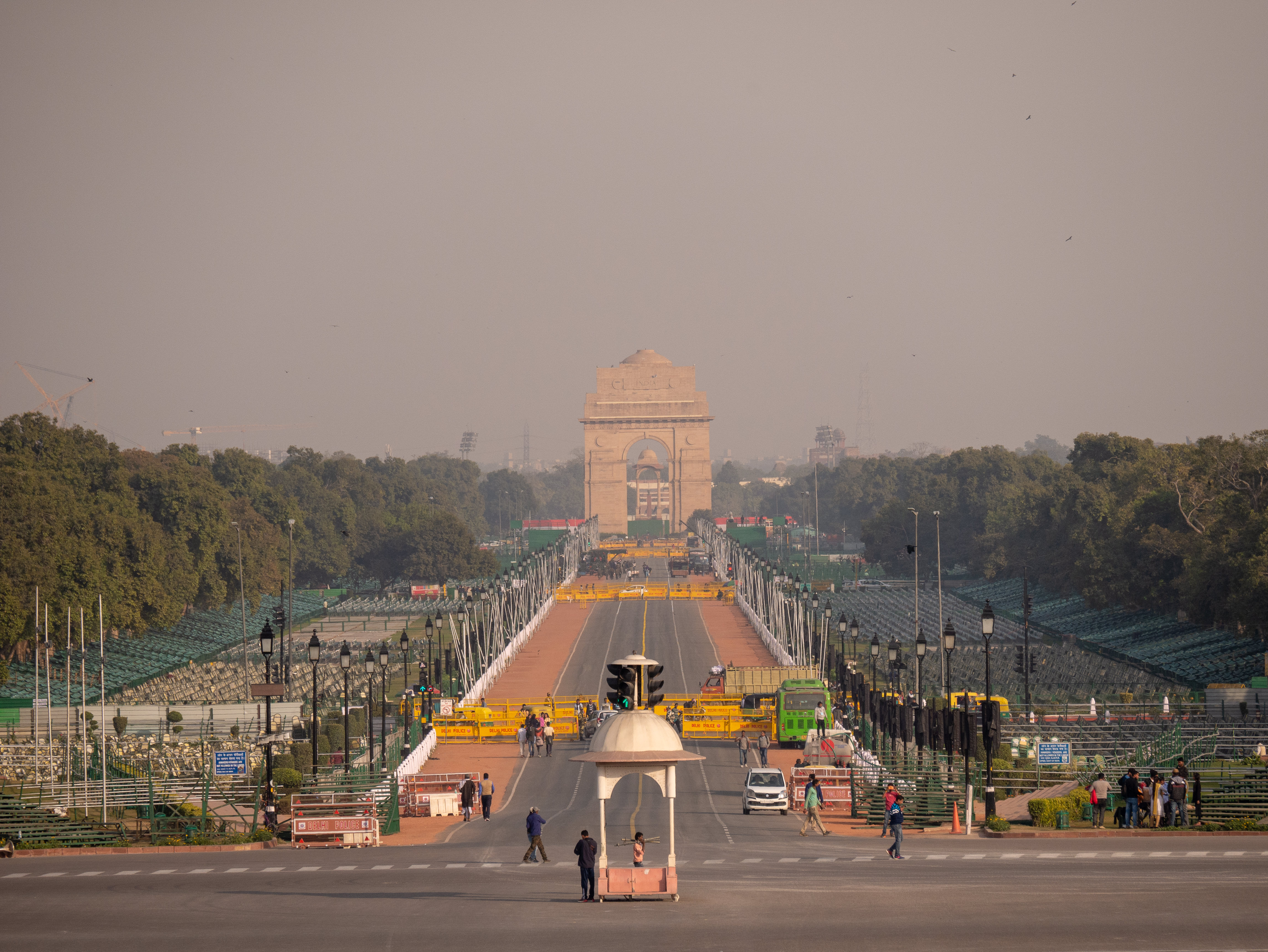
The India Gate stands as a memorial to 74,187 soldiers of the British Indian Army who died between 1914 and 1921 in the First World War.

After World War I, in which approximately one million Indians served in the Indian Army, a new period began. It was marked by the enactment of the Montagu–Chelmsford Reforms as the Government of India Act 1919 but also repressive legislation, by more strident Indian calls for self-rule, and by the beginnings of a nonviolent movement of non-co-operation, of which Mahatma Gandhi would become the leader and enduring symbol. During the 1930s, slow legislative reform was enacted; the Indian National Congress won victories in the resulting elections. The next decade was beset with crises: Indian participation in World War II, the Congress's final push for non-co-operation, and an upsurge of Muslim nationalism. All were capped by the advent of independence in 1947, but tempered by the partition of India into two states: India and Pakistan.

=== Contemporary era ===
The partition of India caused significant upheaval, especially in Punjab and Delhi, with widespread violence and population displacement. Jammu and Kashmir, which acceded to India amid conflict, became a central point of territorial disputes involving India, Pakistan, and China. In the decades after independence, North India underwent major administrative changes. The princely states of the Rajputana Agency were merged to form Rajasthan in 1949. In 1966, Punjab was reorganised along linguistic lines, creating Haryana, Himachal Pradesh, and the present-day Punjab. Punjab also experienced a separatist insurgency in the 1980s. The Union Territory of Delhi was renamed the National Capital Territory of Delhi in 1991, gaining a legislative assembly with limited powers. The Uttarakhand movement, which gained traction in 1994, culminated with Uttarakhand being carved out of Uttar Pradesh as a separate hill state in 2000.

In 2019, the revocation of Article 370 of the Constitution of India changed Jammu and Kashmir's status, dividing it into two union territories Jammu and Kashmir and Ladakh.

== Geography ==
=== Topography ===
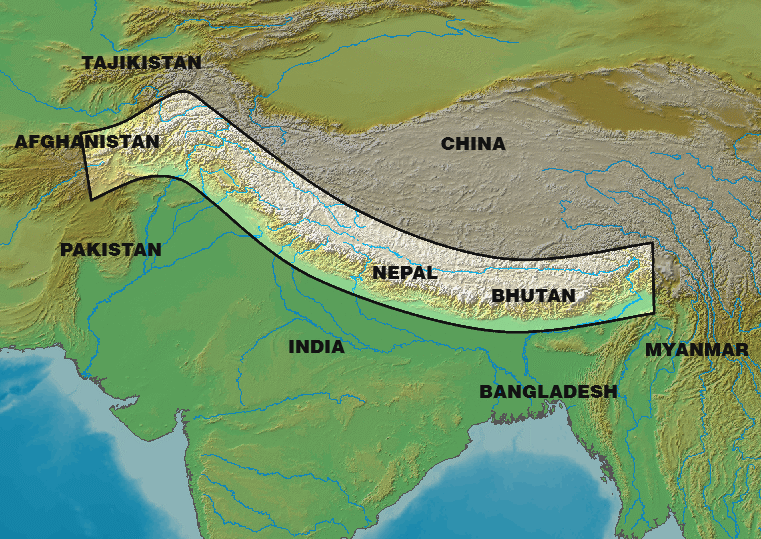
Map of the Himalayas (including the Karakoram and Hindu Kush)

North India exhibits diverse topography consisting of high mountain ranges, fertile plains, deserts, and plateau regions. The northern boundary is dominated by the Himalayas, which extend across Jammu and Kashmir, Himachal Pradesh, and Uttarakhand. The Himalayan system includes the Trans-Himalayan ranges such as the Karakoram Range, Ladakh Range, and Zanskar Range, characterized by rugged terrain and cold desert conditions. South of these ranges lie the Greater Himalayas or Himadri, containing permanently snow-covered peaks and glaciers, including Nanda Devi and the Gangotri Glacier. The Lesser Himalayas and the Shiwalik ranges further south consist of forested hills, valleys, and sedimentary foothills prone to erosion and landslides.

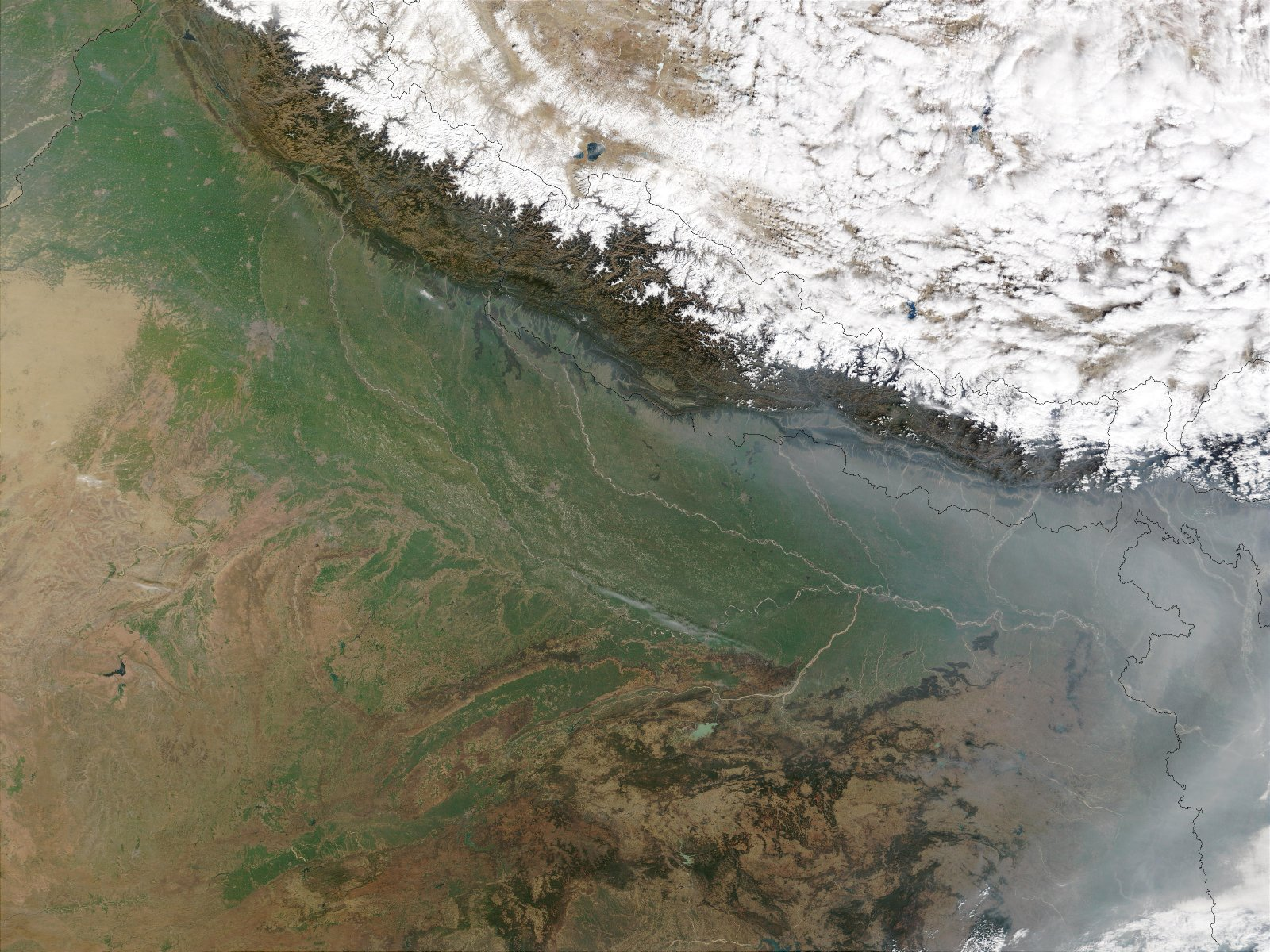
A part of the Gangetic Plain

South of the Himalayas lies the Indo-Gangetic Plain, one of the world's largest alluvial plains, formed by the deposition of sediments carried by the Indus and Ganges river systems and their tributaries. The plains extend across Punjab, Haryana, Uttar Pradesh, and parts of Delhi, and are among the most fertile and densely populated regions in the country. The Punjab Plains are traversed by tributaries of the Indus system, while the Ganga Plains form the agricultural core of northern India.

Western North India is dominated by the Thar Desert in Rajasthan, characterized by sandy plains, dunes, low rainfall, and sparse vegetation. The region contains seasonal rivers such as the Luni River and several saline depressions. Along the eastern margin of the desert lies the Aravalli Range, one of the world's oldest fold mountain systems, extending from Delhi to Gujarat. The range consists of heavily eroded hills rich in mineral resources, with Guru Shikhar as its highest peak. Parts of the Peninsular Plateau also extend into North India through the Malwa and Bundelkhand plateaus, which are characterized by rocky uplands, lava formations, and seasonal river systems.

=== Climate ===
Onset dates and prevailing wind currents of the southwest summer monsoons in India

North India is one of the most climatically diverse regions on Earth. According to the Köppen climate classification, the region lies mainly in the north temperate zone of the Earth The climate varies significantly due to differences in altitude, topography, and distance from the sea. The higher Himalayan regions experience alpine and tundra climatic conditions, with heavy snowfall during winter and cool summers, while the Trans-Himalayan areas exhibit cold desert conditions with low precipitation. Dras is claimed to be the second-coldest inhabited place on the planet (after Siberia), with a recorded low of −60 °C. The Indo-Gangetic Plains experience a humid subtropical climate characterized by hot summers, cool winters, and seasonal monsoon rainfall. Summers are generally marked by high temperatures and dry winds known locally as loo. During summer, temperatures often rise above 35 °C across much of the Indo-Gangetic plain, reaching as high as 50 °C in the Thar Desert, and up to 49 °C in Delhi. Winters are often accompanied by dense fog, particularly in Punjab, Haryana, and Uttar Pradesh. The western desert regions of Rajasthan experience an arid climate with extreme temperatures, low humidity, and limited rainfall.

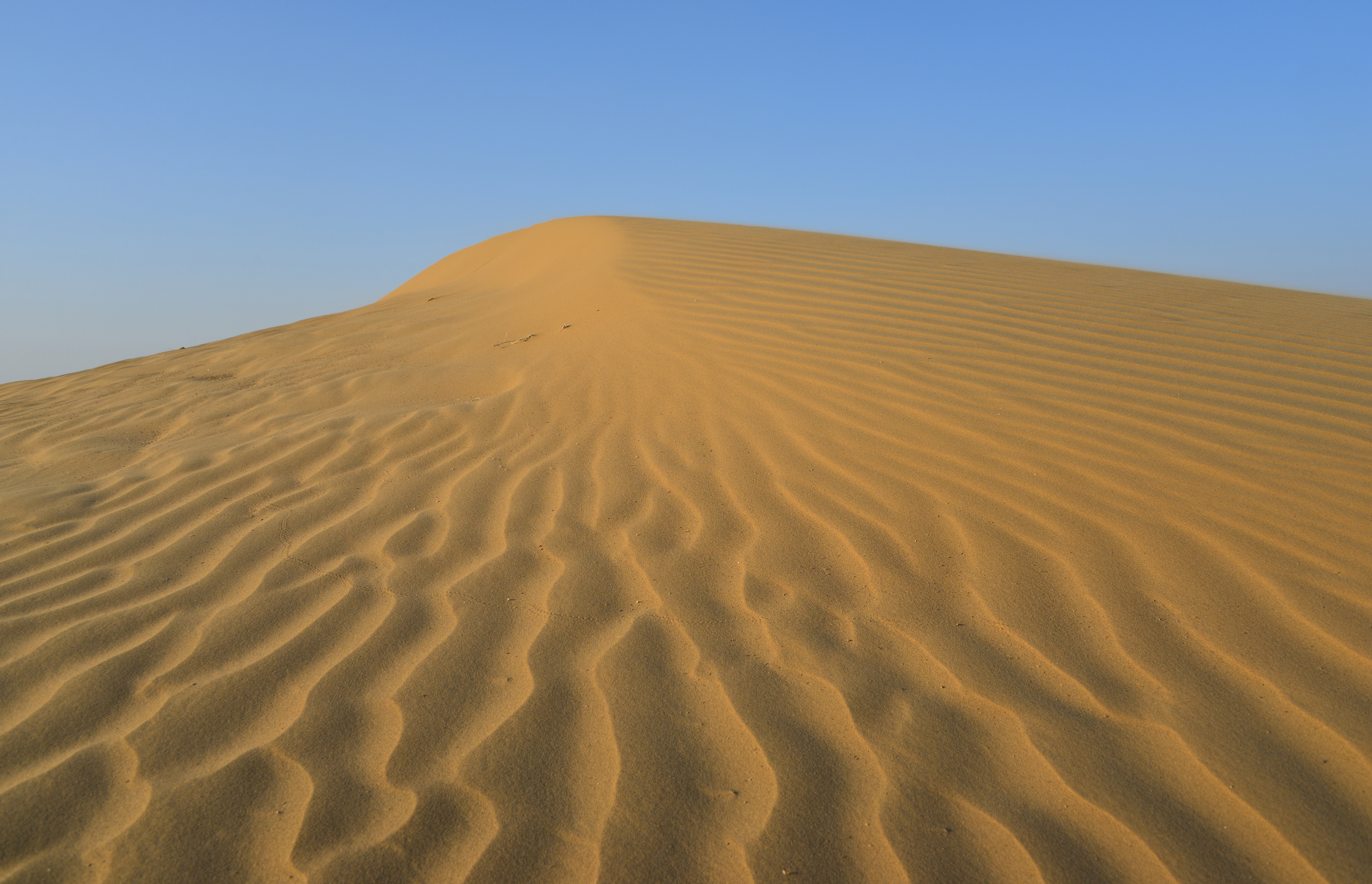
Sand dunes in the Thar Desert

The annual rainfall pattern is dominated by the southwest monsoon, which generally arrives in northern India between late June and early July and lasts until September. The lofty Himalayas play a major role in shaping the climate of the region by acting as a barrier against cold Central Asian winds and intercepting the southwest monsoon winds. As a result, the Himalayan foothills and adjoining plains receive substantial rainfall during the monsoon season. During this period, moisture-laden winds from the Indian Ocean move inland and bring the majority of the region's annual precipitation.

Northern Indian tradition recognises six distinct seasons in the region: summer (grishma or garmi (jyesth- ashadh), May–June), rainy (varsha (shravan-bhadra), July–August), post-monsoon (sharad (ashivan-kartik), September–October, sometimes thought of as 'early autumn'), autumn (hemant (margh-paush), November–December, also called patjhar, lit. leaf-fall), winter (shishir or sardi (magh-phagun),January–February) and spring (vasant (chaitra-baishakh), March–April). The literature, poetry and folklore of the region uses references to these six seasons quite extensively and has done so since ancient times when Sanskrit was prevalent. In the mountainous areas, sometimes the winter is further divided into "big winter" (e.g. Kashmiri chillai kalaan) and "little winter" (chillai khurd).

=== Flora and fauna ===
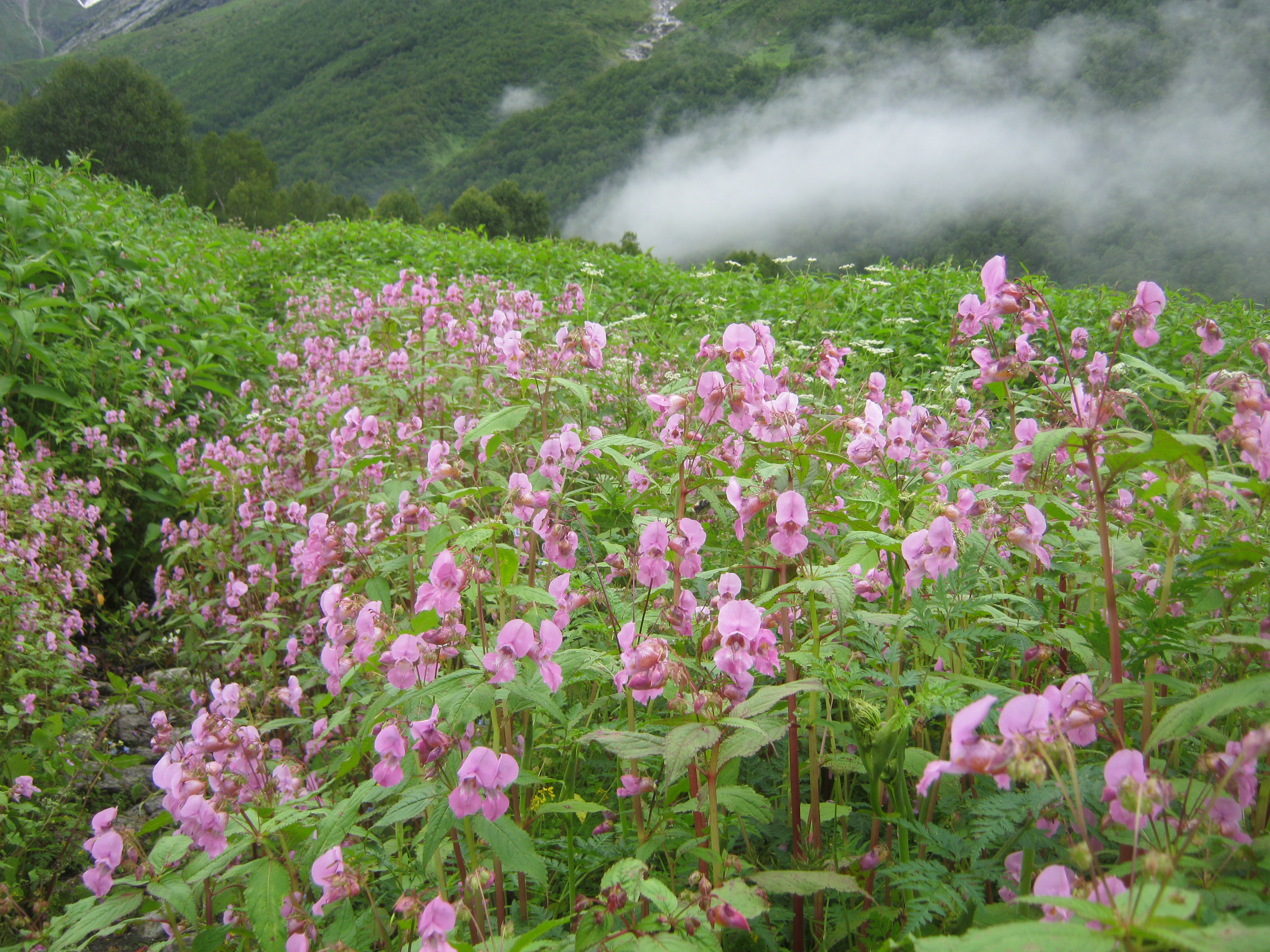
Valley of Flowers, Chamoli

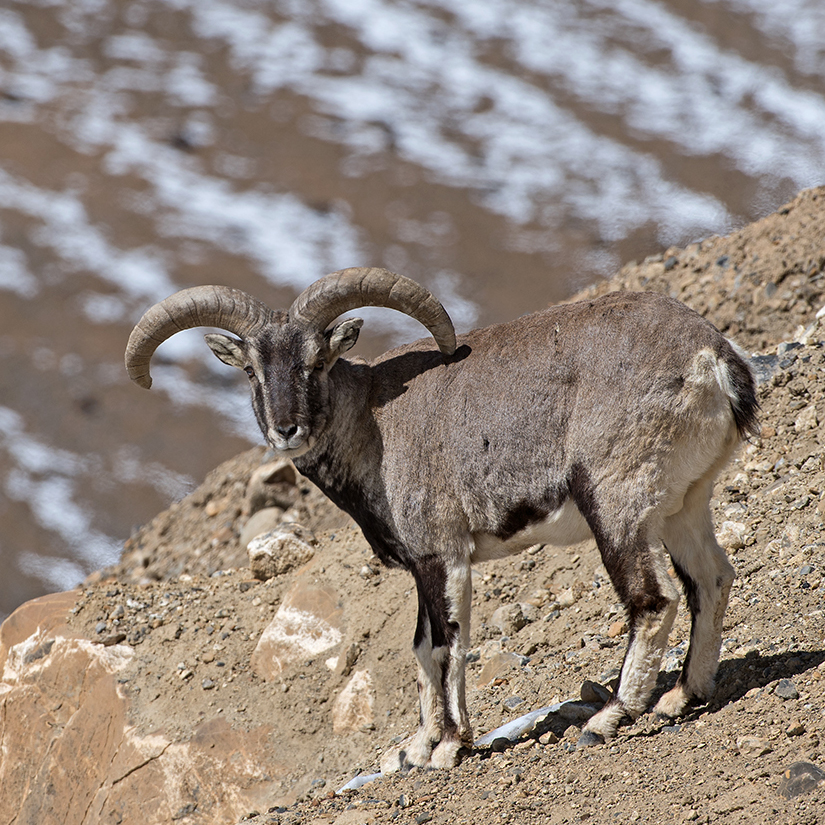
Male Bharal in Spiti Valley

The varied topography and climate of North India support diverse vegetation and wildlife. Alpine vegetation is found in the higher Himalayan regions, where low temperatures permit the growth of grasses, mosses, and dwarf shrubs. Coniferous forests consisting of pine, deodar, fir, and spruce dominate the middle Himalayan altitudes, while temperate broadleaf forests occur in lower elevations. Montane ecosystems are found in the colder regions of Himachal Pradesh, Uttarakhand, and Jammu and Kashmir. Cold desert ecosystems occur in Ladakh and the Spiti Valley of Himachal Pradesh. The Western Himalayan region abounds in chir, pine, deodar (Himalayan cedar), blue pine, spruce, firs, birch and junipers. The Himalayan region is also home to wildlife species such as the snow leopard, Himalayan black bear, musk deer, red fox, and Himalayan monal. The Indo-Gangetic Plains historically supported subtropical moist deciduous forests, although much of the natural vegetation has been cleared for agriculture and urbanization. Common tree species in the plains include sal, teak, neem, peepal, and banyan. Subtropical dry deciduous forests are found in eastern Rajasthan, Haryana, Punjab, and parts of Delhi along the Aravalli Range. The region also contains extensive grasslands, including dry rocky shrublands along the Thar Desert in western Rajasthan and areas bordering the Central Highlands. Thorn forest vegetation includes babul, dhok, palash, khejri, and khair. The thorn woodland region mainly contains shrubs and trees like babul, khejri, ronjh, and khair along with dhok and palash in upland regions. Seasonal riverine grasslands occur alongside rivers in the Punjab Plain and the Upper Doab. The primary fauna of this forest includes the Indian leopard, golden jackal, jungle cat, and striped hyena. Wetlands and riverine ecosystems in the plains support species such as gharials, freshwater dolphins, migratory birds, and numerous fish species. In the arid regions of the Thar Desert, thorn forests and scrub vegetation predominate, with species adapted to dry conditions, including acacia and khejri trees. Wildlife in the desert includes camels, desert foxes, chinkara, and the great Indian bustard. The strikingly coloured bir bahuti is also found in this region.

Important ecological regions of North India include the Nanda Devi Biosphere Reserve in the Himalayas, Jim Corbett National Park is a protected forest area and a major component of the Tiger Reserve under Project Tiger, Keoladeo National Park, a UNESCO World Heritage wetland famous for Siberian crane migratory birds, and Valley of Flowers National Park, known for its alpine flora and endemic species. Great Himalayan National Park is located in Himachal Pradesh and ranges in altitude from 5,000 to 17,500 feet, host the Himalayan brown bear and the musk deer. Located in Rajasthan, Desert National Park features extensive sand dunes and dry salt lakes.

Official State Symbols of North Indian states
Name	Animal	Bird	Tree	Fruit	Flower
Delhi	Nilgai (Boselaphus tragocamelus)	House Sparrow (Passer domesticus)	Neem (Azadirachta indica)	Mango (Mangifera indica)	Common jasmine (Jasminum officinale)
Haryana	Black buck (Antilope cervicapra)	Black francolin (Francolinus francolinus)	Peepal (Ficus religiosa)	Mango (Mangifera indica)	Lotus (Nelumbo nucifera)
Himachal Pradesh	Snow Leopard (Panthera uncia)	Western tragopan (Tragopan melanocephalus)	Deodar (Cedrus deodara)	Apple (Malus domestica)	Gulabi (Rhododendron campanulatum)
Jammu and Kashmir	Kashmir Stag (Cervus hanglu hanglu)	Kalij pheasant (Lophura leucomelanos)	Chinar (Platanus orientalis)	Apple (Malus domestica)	Pamposh(Nelumbo nucifera)
Ladakh	Indian palm squirrel (Funambulus palmarum)	Juniper (Juniperus semiglobosa)	Apricot (Prunus armeniaca)	Himalayan Blue Poppy (Meconopsis aculeata)	Cannonball (Couroupita guianensis)
Punjab	Blackbuck (Antilope cervicapra)	Baaz (Accipiter gentilis)	Sheesham (Dalbergia sissoo)	Kinnow (Citrus reticulata)	Sword Lily (Gladiolus grandiflorus)
Rajasthan	Chinkara (Gazella Bennettii) and Camel(Camelus)	Great Indian bustard (Ardeotis nigriceps)	Khejri (Prosopis cineraria)	Indian jujube (Ziziphus mauritiana)	Brahma Kamal (Saussurea obvallata)
Uttarakhand	Alpine musk deer (Moschus chrysogaster)	Himalayan monal (Lophophorus impejanus)	Burans (Rhododendron arboreum)	Bayberry (Myrica)	Tanner's cassia (Senna auriculata)
Uttar Pradesh	Swamp deer (Rucervus duvaucelii)	Sarus crane (Grus antigone)	Ashoka (Saraca asoca)	Mango (Mangifera indica)	Palash (Butea monosperma)

== Politics ==
Politics in North India is marked by a blend of regional and national political parties, with a strong presence of the Indian National Congress (INC) and the Bharatiya Janata Party (BJP), alongside significant regional players. The region played a crucial role in the Indian freedom movement, and post-independence, political dynamics were initially dominated by the INC. The Congress established a firm grip over states like Uttar Pradesh, Punjab, Maharashtra and southern states, with prominent leaders such as Jawaharlal Nehru, Indira Gandhi, Shri Krishna Sinha, K. Kamaraj and Zail Singh leading national politics.

The post-independence period also saw the emergence of regional political movements. In Punjab, the Shiromani Akali Dal became a major force representing Sikh political interests. However, the political landscape of North India took a significant turn in the 1990s with the rise of the Bharatiya Janata Party (BJP), which came to prominence following the Ram Janmabhoomi movement and the subsequent demolition of the Babri Masjid in 1992. The BJP's rise was further fueled by its strong stance on Hindu nationalism and its appeal to the urban and rural electorate in the Hindi heartland. Subsequently, in Uttar Pradesh, parties such as the Samajwadi Party and the Bahujan Samaj Party gained prominence by mobilizing support among Other Backward Classes (OBCs), Dalits, and other marginalized groups. Caste and religious identities have remained significant factors influencing electoral politics across the region.

Uttar Pradesh, the most populous state in India, has long been a battleground for the INC, BJP, SP, and BSP. The BSP, under the leadership of Mayawati, has emerged as a dominant force in representing Dalit and backward communities, while the SP, led by the Yadav family, continues to assert its influence over the OBC vote base. The Congress, once the dominant force in the state, has lost its foothold in recent decades, but it continues to hold sway in pockets, particularly in urban centers. In Punjab, the political scene has been dominated by the SAD, which has a strong following among the Sikh community, and the INC, which has had a fluctuating relationship with the state due to the legacy of the Punjab insurgency in the 1980s. The state witnessed significant political change after the 2017 elections, with the emergence of the Aam Aadmi Party (AAP) as a major contender, offering an alternative to traditional parties. Rajasthan and Madhya Pradesh have also experienced alternating political control between the INC and BJP, with regional leaders like Ashok Gehlot in Rajasthan and Shivraj Singh Chouhan in Madhya Pradesh asserting strong regional leadership. In Delhi, the Aam Aadmi Party (AAP), under the leadership of Arvind Kejriwal, has rapidly risen to prominence, challenging the traditional dominance of the Congress and BJP.

The northern hill and border states and union territories—Jammu and Kashmir, Ladakh, Uttarakhand, and Himachal Pradesh have distinct political dynamics shaped by geography, security concerns, and regional aspirations. Politics in Jammu and Kashmir has historically revolved around issues of autonomy, governance, and relations with the Union government, with parties like the Jammu & Kashmir National Conference and Jammu and Kashmir Peoples Democratic Party playing key roles. The reorganization of the state following the Revocation of Article 370 marked a major shift, bringing it and Ladakh under direct union territory administration. In Ladakh, politics is more localized, focusing on development, tribal rights, and representation, with organizations like the Ladakh Autonomous Hill Development Council. In Uttarakhand and Himachal Pradesh, politics is largely dominated by the Bharatiya Janata Party and the Indian National Congress, with power frequently alternating between the two. Key issues in these Himalayan states include infrastructure development, tourism, environmental conservation, and disaster management due to their fragile ecology. Meanwhile, Haryana has a politically competitive landscape influenced by agrarian issues, caste dynamics, and proximity to the national capital New Delhi. Regional parties such as the Indian National Lok Dal and newer formations like the Jannayak Janta Party have played significant roles alongside national parties.

North India—particularly Uttar Pradesh—has produced the highest number of Prime Ministers of India, either by birthplace or political base, including leaders like Jawaharlal Nehru, Indira Gandhi, Vishwanath Pratap Singh and Atal Bihari Vajpayee. The region has produced several prominent national leaders, including Govind Ballabh Pant, Jayaprakash Narayan, and Kanshi Ram. North India has also contributed to the country's presidency, with notable figures like Rajendra Prasad, Zakir Husain, Fakhruddin Ali Ahmed, Giani Zail Singh and Ram Nath Kovind all hailing from this region.

=== Administration ===
North India consists of several northern states including Punjab, Haryana, Himachal Pradesh, Uttarakhand, Uttar Pradesh, and Rajasthan, along with the union territories of Chandigarh, Delhi, Jammu and Kashmir, and Ladakh. These states and union territories have varying administrative structures: the states and Delhi have elected legislatures, while Jammu and Kashmir (with provisions for a legislature) and Ladakh are administered under the framework of the Union government.

A governor, appointed by the Government of India through the President of India, serves as the de jure head of each state, while the leader of the majority party or coalition in the legislative assembly is appointed as the Chief Minister, the de facto head of the government. In union territories like Delhi, a Lieutenant Governor represents the central government, alongside an elected Chief Minister, whereas Ladakh is directly governed by a Lieutenant Governor without a legislature.

Administratively, the states and union territories of North India are divided into districts, each headed by a District Magistrate or Deputy Commissioner responsible for law and order, revenue collection, and general administration. These districts are further subdivided into tehsils or taluqs, overseen by tehsildars, and into blocks for developmental administration. At the grassroots level, local governance is carried out through urban bodies such as municipal corporations, municipalities, and cantonment boards, and rural bodies including zila parishads, panchayat samitis, and gram panchayats, forming a multi-tiered system of governance across the region.

==== States and UTs ====
Name	ISO	Established	Area (km^{2})	Capital
Chandigarh	CH	1 November 1956	114	Chandigarh
Delhi	DL	1 February 1992	1,484	New Delhi
Haryana	HR	1 November 1956	44,212	Chandigarh
Himachal Pradesh	HP	25 January 1971	55,673	Shimla
Jammu and Kashmir	JK	31 October 2019	42,241	Srinagar (summer); Jammu (winter)
Ladakh	LA	31 October 2019	59,146	Leh
Punjab	PB	1 November 1966	50,362	Chandigarh
Rajasthan	RJ	30 March 1949	342,239	Jaipur
Uttarakhand	UK	9 November 2000	53,483	Dehradun (winter); Gairsain (summer)
Uttar Pradesh	UP	26 January 1950	243,286	Lucknow

=== Legislative representation ===
Legislative assemblies of states

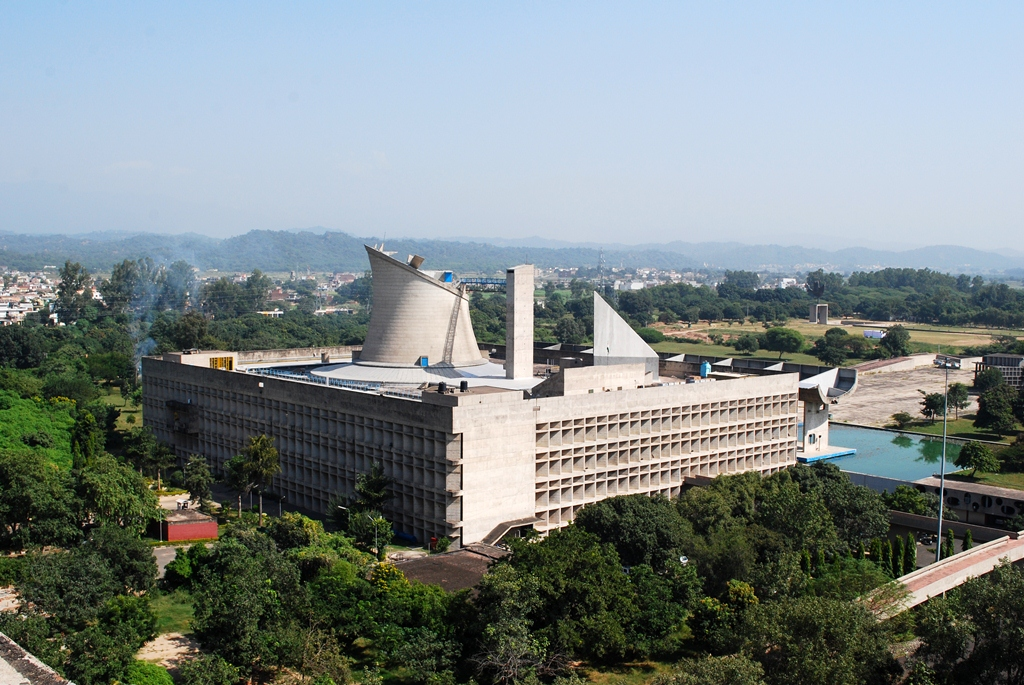
Palace of Assembly (Punjabd and Haryana)

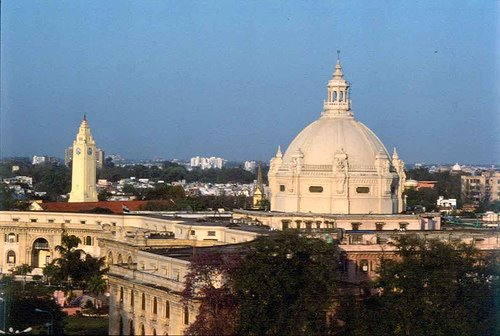
Vidhan Bhavan (Uttar Pradesh)

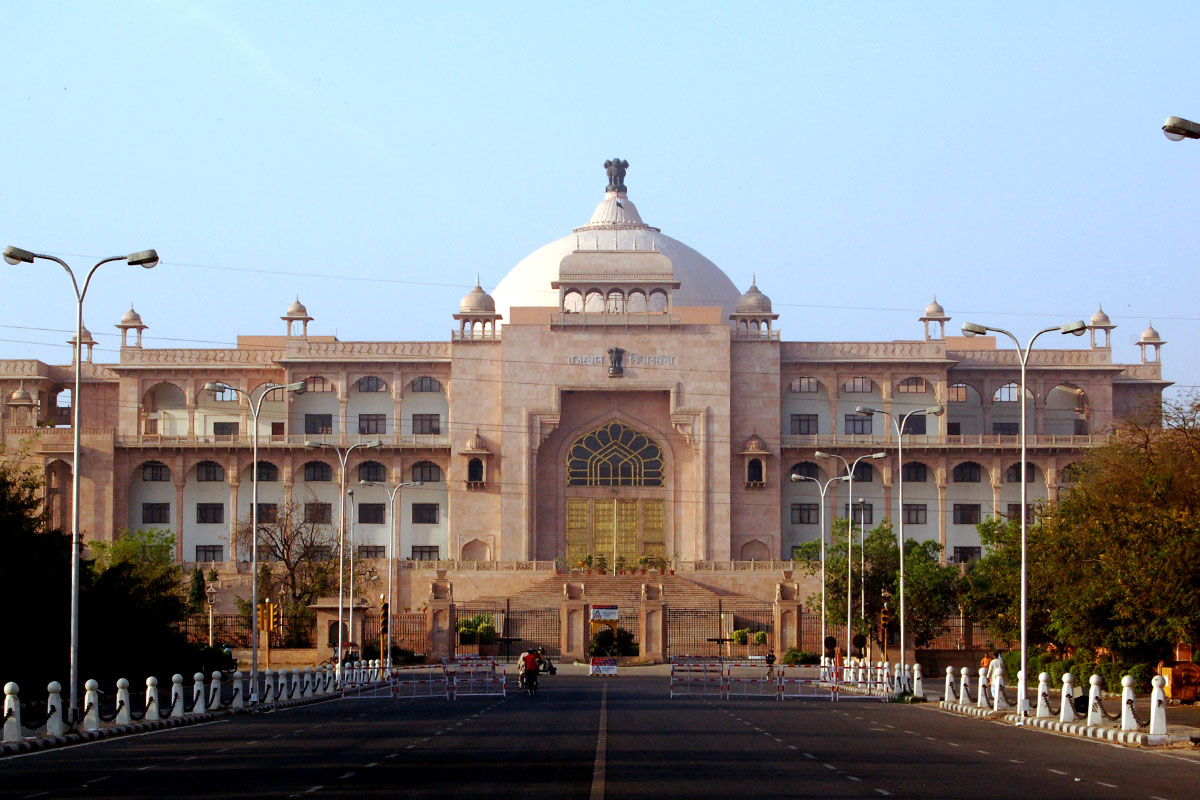
Vidhan Bhavan (Rajasthan)

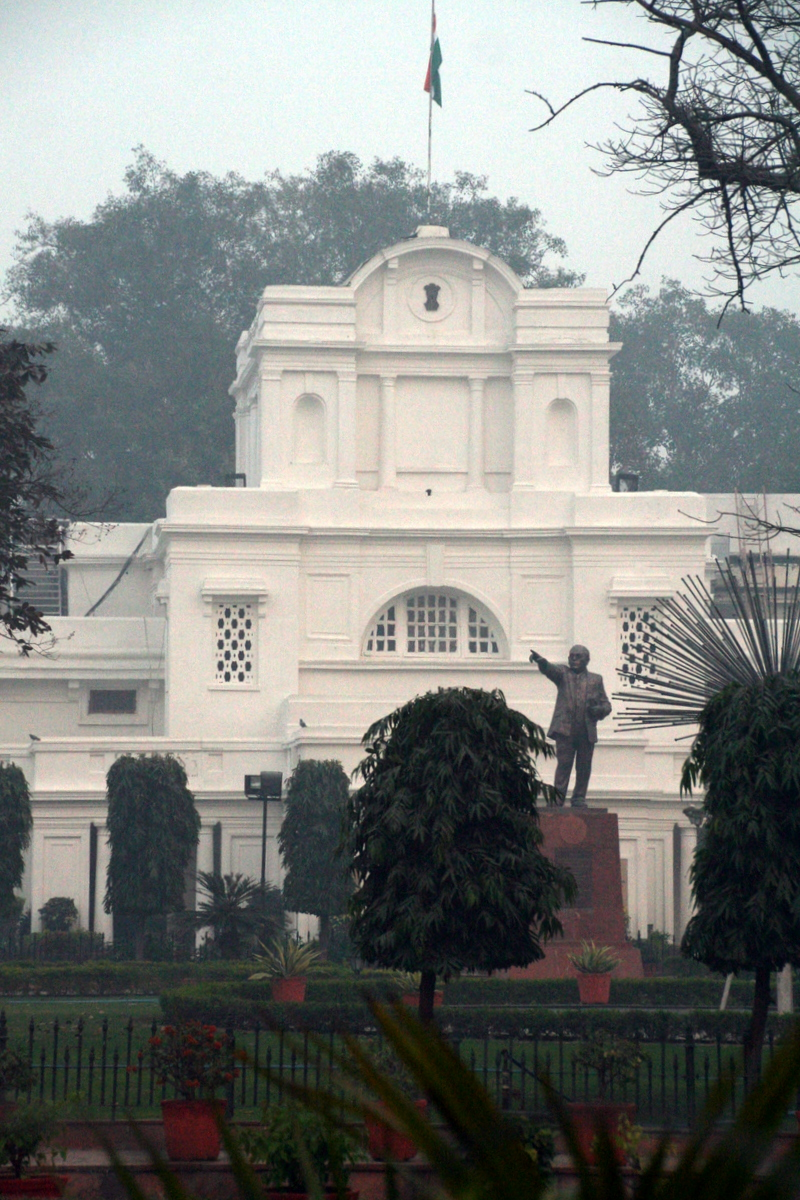
Old Secretariat (Delhi)

North India elects 150 members to the Lok Sabha, accounting for roughly one-fourth of the total strength of 543. The region is allocated 66 seats in the Rajya Sabha, out of the total 245 members.

The state legislatures of Rajasthan, Haryana, Punjab, Himachal Pradesh, Uttarakhand, and Delhi are unicameral, while Uttar Pradesh has a bicameral legislature. In states with a bicameral legislature, the upper house (Legislative Council) has members not more than one-third the size of the Assembly; while Chandigarh and Ladakh have none. State legislatures elect members for terms of five years. Governors may suspend or dissolve assemblies and can administer the state when no party is able to form a government.

State/UT	Lok Sabha	Rajya Sabha	State Assembly	Governor/Lt. Governor/Administrator	Chief Minister
Chandigarh	1	0	0	Gulab Chand Kataria	—N/a
Delhi	7	3	70	Taranjit Singh Sandhu	Rekha Gupta
Haryana	10	5	90	Ashim Kumar Ghosh	Nayab Singh Saini
Himachal Pradesh	4	3	68	Kavinder Gupta	Sukhvinder Singh Sukhu
Jammu and Kashmir	5	4	90	Manoj Sinha	Omar Abdullah
Ladakh	1	0	0	Vinai Kumar Saxena	—N/a
Punjab	13	7	117	Gulab Chand Kataria	Bhagwant Mann
Rajasthan	25	10	200	Haribhau Kisanrao Bagde	Bhajan Lal Sharma
Uttarakhand	5	3	70	Gurmit Singh	Pushkar Singh Dhami
Uttar Pradesh	80	31	403 (Note: legislative council seats 100)	Anandiben Patel	Yogi Adityanath
Total	150	66	922		

== Demographics ==
The people of North India mostly belong to the Indo-Aryan ethno-linguistic branch, and include various social groups such as Brahmins, Rajputs, Kayasthas, Banias, Jats, Rors, Gurjars, Yadavs, Khatris and Kambojs. There is a significant presence of Tibeto-Burman groups along the Himalayan states, while small populations of Dravidians and Austroasiatics exist in parts of southeastern Uttar Pradesh.

Population of states and union territories of North India (2011 Census of India)
State or Union Territory	Population	Growth (2001–2012)	2025 Population Estimate	Rural pop.		Urban pop.		Density (per sq km) (Note: For determining population density of India and the State of Jammu and Kashmir, the data excludes areas claimed by India but controlled by Pakistan (78,114 km^{2}) and China (5,180 km^{2} in Shaksgam Valley and 37,555 km^{2} under Aksai Chin and other areas).)	Sex ratio (per 1000 female)
State or Union Territory	Population	Growth (2001–2012)	2025 Population Estimate	Nos.	%	Nos.	%	Density (per sq km)	Sex ratio (per 1000 female)
States
Haryana	25,351,462	19.9%	30,936,000	16,509,359	65.12%	8,842,103	34.88%	573	879
Himachal Pradesh	6,864,602	12.9%	7,542,000	6,176,050	89.97%	688,552	10.03%	123	972
Punjab	27,743,338	13.89%	31,122,000	17,344,192	62.52%	10,399,146	37.48%	551	895
Rajasthan	68,548,437	21.3%	82,770,000	51,500,352	75.13%	17,048,085	24.87%	201	928
Uttar Pradesh	199,812,341	20.2%	240,468,000	155,317,278	77.73%	44,495,063	22.27%	828	912
Uttarakhand	10,086,292	18.8%	11,874,000	7,036,954	69.77%	3,049,338	30.23%	189	963
Union Territories
Chandigarh	1,055,450	17.2%	1,255,000	28,991	2.75%	1,026,459	97.25%	9,252	818
Jammu and Kashmir	12,267,032	23.6%	13,798,000	9,064,220	73.89%	3,202,812	26.11%	297	890
Ladakh	274,000	17.8%	304,000	43,840	16%	230,160	84%	2.8	853
NCT of Delhi	16,787,941	21.2%	22,146,000	419,042	2.5%	16,368,899	97.5%	11,297	868

=== Religion ===
Hinduism is the dominant religion in North India. Other religions practised by various ethnic communities include Islam, Sikhism, Jainism, Zoroastrianism, Judaism, Baháʼí, Christianity, and Buddhism. Hindus constitute more than 80 per cent of the North India's population. The national capital of India, New Delhi, is overwhelmingly Hindu-majority with Hindus constituting nearly 90% of the capital city's population. The states of Rajasthan, Haryana, Himachal Pradesh are overwhelmingly Hindu-majority. Uttarakhand and Uttar Pradesh are also Hindu majority states, but have a large Muslim minority (14% In Uttarakhand, 19% in Uttar Pradesh). Chandigarh is also a Hindu-majority union territory, though also having a quarter (25%) of Sikh presence as well. The union territory of Jammu and Kashmir has a Muslim majority, while Ladakh has a Muslim plurality with minority Hindus and Buddhists. The state of Punjab has a Sikh majority of 60% and is the homeland of Sikh religion.

=== Languages ===
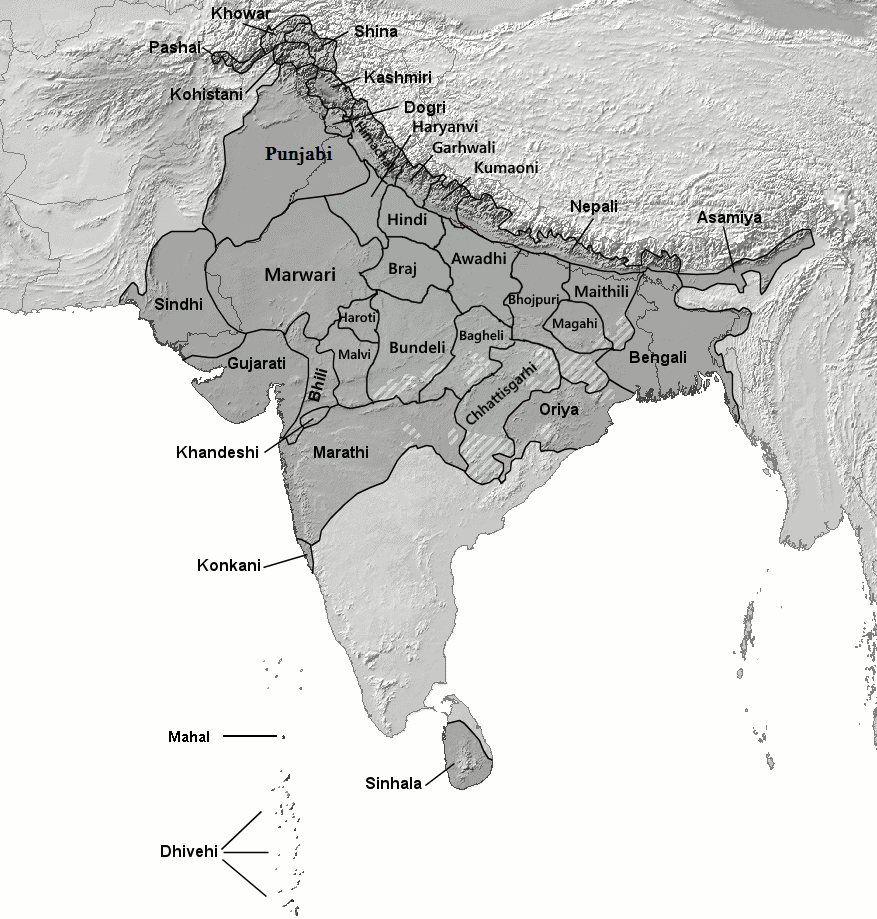
Distribution of Indo-Aryan languages

Linguistically, North India is dominated by Indo-Aryan languages. It is in this region, or its proximity, that Sanskrit and the various Prakrits are thought to have evolved. Hindi is spoken in Western Uttar Pradesh and Delhi and by a large number of people in many urban centres across North India. Many other languages of the Central Indo-Aryan languages such as Awadhi, Braj, Haryanvi, Chhattisgarhi, Bundeli and Bagheli are spoken in Haryana, Uttar Pradesh, Madhya Pradesh and Chhattisgarh. Marwari, Harauti, Malvi, Gujarati, Khandeshi, Marathi and Konkani are spoken in Rajasthan, extreme eastern Madhya Pradesh, Gujarat, Maharashtra and Goa. Towards the far north, languages of Dardic (such as Kashmiri) and Pahari (such as Dogri, Kumaoni and Garhwali) groups are spoken in Jammu and Kashmir, Himachal and Uttarakhand. Punjabi is spoken in Punjab. Bengali is spoken in West Bengal. Languages of Bihari group, such as Maithili, Magahi and Bhojpuri are spoken in Bihar and Jharkhand.

A number of aboriginal languages of Austroasiatic and Dravidian origin are spoken in some regions. Several Sino-Tibetan languages are spoken in the Himalayan region like Kinnauri, Ladakhi, Balti, and Lahuli–Spiti languages.

== Culture ==
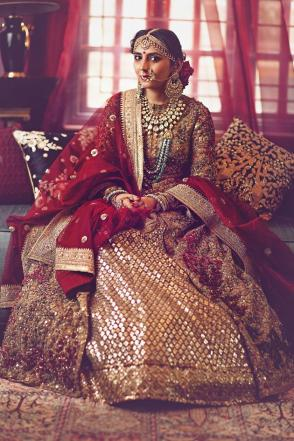
North Indian Hindu bride in Lehenga

The composite culture of North India is known as Ganga-Jamuni tehzeeb, a result of the amicable interaction of Hindus and Muslims there.

=== Dance ===
Dance of North India too has diverse folk and classical forms. Among the well-known folk dances are the bhangra of the Punjab, Ghoomar of Rajasthan, Nati of Himachal Pradesh and rouf and bhand pather of Kashmir. Main dance forms, many with narrative forms and mythological elements, have been accorded classical dance status by India's National Academy of Music, Dance, and Drama such as Kathak.

=== Clothing ===
Each state of North India has its own regional forms of clothing:

1. Uttar Pradesh: Chikan Suit, Pathani Salwar, Kurta Paijama, Lehenga, Gharara, Sari.
2. Jammu: Kurta/Dogri suthan and kurta/churidar pajama and kurta.
3. Kashmir: Pheran, pulhoer and poots.
4. Himachal Pradesh: Shalwar kameez, Kurta, Churidar, Dhoti, Himachali cap and angarkha.
5. Punjab/Haryana: Salwar (Punjabi) Suit, Patiala salwar, Punjabi Tamba and Kurta, Sikh Dastar, Phulkari, Punjabi Ghagra.
6. Uttarakhand: Rangwali Phichora.
7. Rajasthan: Traditional: Ghagra, choli, and odhni for women. Rajasthani pagdi, angarkha/kurta, and dhoti/pyjamas for Men. Mojari are worn for footwear. The pagdi is worn on many occasions, and is part of the heritage of Rajasthan with its many colours and textile design (Leheriya, Bandhej, and Gota Patti). Semi-Formal/Formal: Women often wear the Poshak, historically worn by royalty, and men often wear the Safa/Pagdi, Bandhgala (Jodhpuri suit) along with traditional pants like churidars, dhotis, and Jodhpuri pants. Footwear includes mojari, similar to the shoes found in Sindh.

== Places of interest ==
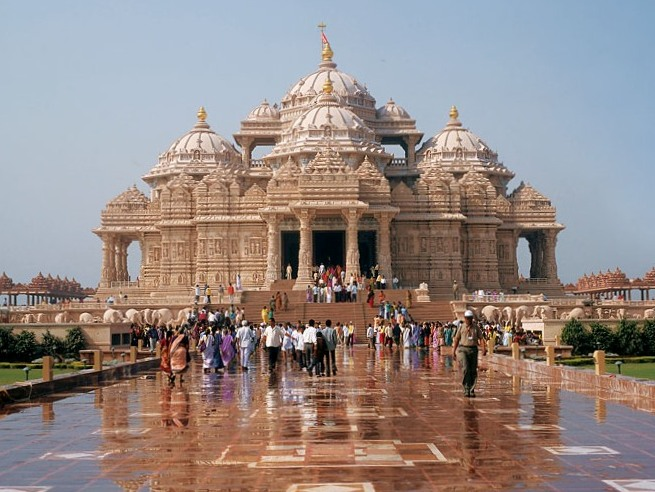
Akshardham Temple, Delhi

=== Nature ===
The Indian Himalayas, the Thar desert and the Indo-Gangetic plain dominate the natural scenery of North India. The region encompasses several of the most highly-regarded hill destinations of India such as Srinagar, Shimla, Manali, Nainital, Mussoorie, Kausani and Mount Abu. Several spots in the states of Uttarakhand and Himachal Pradesh provide panoramic views of the snow-clad Himalayan range. The Himalayan region also provides ample opportunity for adventure sports such as mountaineering, trekking, river rafting and skiing. Camel or jeep safaris of the Thar desert are also popular in the state of Rajasthan. North India includes several national parks and reserve area such as the Pilibhit Tiger Reserve, Nanda Devi Biosphere Reserve, Jim Corbett National Park, Keoladeo National Park Ranthambore National Park, Sundarbans National Park and the Kutch Desert Wildlife Sanctuary.

=== Pilgrimage ===
North India encompasses several pilgrimage centres of Hinduism, some considered the holiest in Hindiuism, including Varanasi, Haridwar, Allahabad, Char Dham, Vaishno Devi, Rishikesh, Ayodhya, Mathura-Vrindavan, Pushkar, Prayag, and two of the twelve Jyotirlinga sites. It also contains what is considered the most sacred destinations of Buddhism (Sarnath and Kushinagar), the most regarded pilgrimage centres of Sikhism (Amritsar and Hemkund), and some highly regarded destinations in Sufi Islam (Ajmer and Delhi). The largest Hindu temple, Akshardham Temple, the largest Buddhist temple in India, Mahabodhi, the largest mosque in India, Jama Masjid, and the largest Sikh shrine, Golden Temple, are all in this region.

=== Historical ===
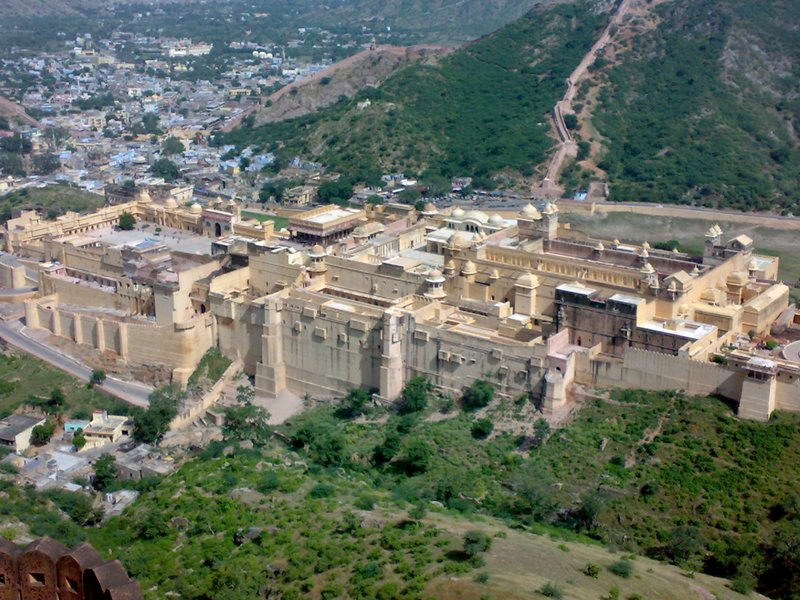
Amer Fort in Rajasthan

North India includes some highly regarded historical, architectural and archaeological treasures of India. The Taj Mahal, an immense mausoleum of white marble in Agra, is one of the universally admired buildings of world heritage. Besides Agra, Fatehpur Sikri and Delhi also carry some great exhibits from the Mughal architecture. In Punjab, Patiala is known for being the city of royalty while Amritsar is a city known for its Sikh architecture and the Golden Temple. Lucknow has the famous Awadhi Nawab culture while Kanpur reflects Anglo-Indian architecture with monuments like All Souls Cathedral, King Edward Memorial, Police Quarters, Cawnpore Woollen Mills, Cutchery Cemetery etc. Khajuraho temples constitute another famous world heritage site. The state of Rajasthan is known for exquisite palaces and forts of the Rajput clans. Historical sites and architecture from the ancient and medieval Hindu and Buddhist periods of Indian history, such as Jageshwar, Deogarh and Sanchi, as well as sites from the Bronze Age Indus Valley civilisation, such as Manda and Alamgirpur, can be found scattered throughout northern India. Varanasi, on the banks of the River Ganga, is considered one of the oldest continuously inhabited cities in the world and the second oldest in India after Nalanda. Bhimbetka is an archaeological site of the Paleolithic era, exhibiting the earliest traces of human life on the Indian subcontinent.

== Economy ==
The economy of North India varies from agrarian in the northern plains to very industrialised in the National Capital Region. Northwest Indian plains have prospered as a consequence of the Green Revolution in Punjab, Haryana and western Uttar Pradesh, and have experienced both economic and social development. The eastern areas of East Uttar Pradesh, however, have lagged and the resulting disparity has contributed to a demand for separate statehood in West Uttar Pradesh (the Harit Pradesh movement).

The major industrial regions in North India are the Gurugram-Delhi-Meerut Belt (NCR). North Indian state with highest GDP per capita in the Indian Union was Haryana in 2021. Other North Indian states which follow are Uttarakhand and Himachal Pradesh. Delhi has the highest per-capita State Domestic Product (SDP) of any Indian union territory. The National Capital Region of Delhi has emerged as an economic power house with rapid industrial growth.

According to a 2009–10 report, a large number of unskilled and skilled workers have moved to southern India and other nations because of the unavailability of jobs locally. The technology boom that occurred in the past three decades in southern India has helped many Indians from the northern region to find jobs and live prosperous lives in southern cities. An analysis by Multidimensional Poverty Index creators reveals that acute poverty prevails in eight Indian states including the northern states of Rajasthan and Uttar Pradesh.

== Cuisine ==
=== Popular dishes ===
The best-known North-Indian food items are:

- Tandoori chicken
- Reshmi kabab
- Kadai paneer
- Chole bhature
- Aloo paratha
- Butter chicken
- Siddu

== See also ==
- Northern South Asia
- Northeast India
- South India
- East India
- Western India

== Bibliography ==
- Asher, C. B.; Talbot, C. (2008), India Before Europe, Cambridge University Press, ISBN 978-0-521-51750-8
- Brown, Judith M. (1994), Modern India: The Origins of an Asian Democracy (2nd ed.), Oxford University Press, p. 480, ISBN 978-0-19-873113-9, archived from the original on 3 October 2008
- Coningham, Robin; Young, Ruth (2015), The Archaeology of South Asia: From the Indus to Asoka, c. 6500 BCE – 200 CE, Cambridge University Press, ISBN 978-0-521-84697-4
- Copland, I. (2001), India 1885–1947: The Unmaking of an Empire, Longman, ISBN 978-0-582-38173-5
- Dyson, Tim (2018), A Population History of India: From the First Modern People to the Present Day, Oxford University Press, ISBN 978-0-19-882905-8
- Fisher, Michael H. (2018), An Environmental History of India: From Earliest Times to the Twenty-First Century, Cambridge and New York: Cambridge University Press, doi:10.1017/9781316276044, ISBN 978-1-107-11162-2, LCCN 2018021693, S2CID 134229667
- Kulke, H.; Rothermund, D. (2004), A History of India, 4th, Routledge, ISBN 978-0-415-32920-0
- Ludden, D. (2002), India and South Asia: A Short History, Oneworld Publications, ISBN 978-1-85168-237-9
- Metcalf, Barbara D.; Metcalf, Thomas R. (2006), A Concise History of Modern India (2nd ed.), Cambridge University Press, ISBN 978-0-521-68225-1
- Peers, D. M. (2006), India under Colonial Rule: 1700–1885, Pearson Longman, ISBN 978-0-582-31738-3
- Petraglia, Michael D.; Allchin, Bridget (2007), "Human evolution and culture change in the Indian subcontinent", in Michael Petraglia; Bridget Allchin (eds.), The Evolution and History of Human Populations in South Asia: Inter-disciplinary Studies in Archaeology, Biological Anthropology, Linguistics and Genetics, Springer Publishing, ISBN 978-1-4020-5562-1
- Possehl, G. (2003), The Indus Civilization: A Contemporary Perspective, Rowman Altamira, ISBN 978-0-7591-0172-2
- Robb, P. (2001), A History of India, Palgrave, ISBN 978-0-333-69129-8
- Sarkar, S. (1983), Modern India: 1885–1947, Delhi: Macmillan, ISBN 978-0-333-90425-1
- Singh, Upinder (2009), A History of Ancient and Medieval India: From the Stone Age to the 12th Century, Delhi: Longman, ISBN 978-81-317-1677-9
- Stein, B. (1998), A History of India, Oxford: Wiley-Blackwell, ISBN 978-0-631-20546-3
- Stein, B. (2010), Arnold, D. (ed.), A History of India (2nd ed.), Oxford: Wiley-Blackwell, ISBN 978-1-4051-9509-6
- Witzel, Michael (2003), "Vedas and Upanișads", in Gavin D. Flood (ed.), The Blackwell companion to Hinduism, John Wiley & Sons, ISBN 978-0-631-21535-6
