= Jaya Bharata Jananiya Tanujate =

State Anthem of Karnataka

Jaya Bhārata Jananiya Tanujāte, Jaya Hē Karnāṭaka Māte
English: Victory to Thee Mother Karnataka, Daughter of Mother India
- ಜಯ ಭಾರತ ಜನನಿಯ ತನುಜಾತೆ, ಜಯ ಹೇ ಕರ್ನಾಟಕ ಮಾತೆ
- Emblem of Karnataka
- State Anthem of Karnataka
- Also known as: ಕರ್ನಾಟಕದ ರಾಜ್ಯ ನಾಡಗೀತೆ (English: Karnataka State Anthem)
- Lyrics: Kuppalli Venkatappa Puttappa
- Music: Mysore Ananthaswamy
- Published: 1924 (102 years ago)
- Adopted: 6 January 2004 (22 years ago)
- Preceded by: Kayo Shri Gowri (Kingdom of Mysore 1868–1950)

"Jaya Bhārata Jananiya Tanujāte, Jaya Hē Karnāṭaka Māte" (pronounced [dʒaja bʱaːɾat̪a dʒananija t̪anudʒaːt̪e | dʒaja heː kaɾnaːʈaka mat̪e]; lit. 'Victory to Thee Mother Karnataka, Daughter of Mother India') is a Kannada-language poem composed by Kuvempu. The poem was officially declared the state anthem of the Indian state of Karnataka in 2004.

The poem envisages a Karnataka that recognises its position in the comity of Indian states, believes in peaceful co-existence with her sisters, but at the same time maintains her self-respect and dignity from a position of confidence and strength rather than insecurity and fear.

== Background ==
The poem was written by Kuvempu, and singer Mysore Ananthaswamy gave it a tune in the 1960s. Ananthaswamy also sang it in Kuvempu's presence in Maharaja's College, Mysore, and noted in his diary that the latter had approved the tune.

It was reported that the government of Karnataka proposed the poem to be made the anthem of Karnataka first in 2000. In December 2003, the state cabinet announced its decision again, to coincide with the birth centenary of Kuvempu. The government added that it would not be made mandatory for the schools to sing the anthem. The decision was finalized on 10 January 2004 when the government issued an order declaring it as state anthem (naadageethe). It directed that the song should be rendered daily before the commencement of classes in all schools and that it should also be sung at all events. It also added that those present at the time of rendering should stand up as a mark of respect to the State, and that school authorities and organisers of events had been informed that they could use a select portion of the song brought out in the annexure of the order. The anthem is a truncated version of the poem; 21 of the original 44 lines were excluded.

== Lyrics ==
Kannada original

ಜಯ ಭಾರತ ಜನನಿಯ ತನುಜಾತೆ,
ಜಯ ಹೇ ಕರ್ನಾಟಕ ಮಾತೆ!
ಜಯ ಸುಂದರ ನದಿ ವನಗಳ ನಾಡೇ,
ಜಯ ಹೇ ರಸಋಷಿಗಳ ಬೀಡೆ!

ಭೂದೇವಿಯ ಮಕುಟದ ನವಮಣಿಯೆ,
ಗಂಧದ ಚಂದದ ಹೊನ್ನಿನ ಗಣಿಯೆ;
ರಾಘವ ಮಧುಸೂದನರವತರಿಸಿದ
ಭಾರತ ಜನನಿಯ ತನುಜಾತೆ!
ಜಯ ಹೇ ಕರ್ನಾಟಕ ಮಾತೆ!

ಜನನಿಯ ಜೋಗುಳ ವೇದದ ಘೋಷ,
ಜನನಿಗೆ ಜೀವವು ನಿನ್ನಾವೇಶ!
ಹಸುರಿನ ಗಿರಿಗಳ ಸಾಲೇ,
ನಿನ್ನಯ ಕೊರಳಿನ ಮಾಲೆ!
ಕಪಿಲ ಪತಂಜಲ ಗೌತಮ ಜಿನನುತ,
ಭಾರತ ಜನನಿಯ ತನುಜಾತೆ!
ಜಯ ಹೇ ಕರ್ನಾಟಕ ಮಾತೆ!

ಶಂಕರ ರಾಮಾನುಜ ವಿದ್ಯಾರಣ್ಯ,
ಬಸವೇಶ್ವರ ಮಧ್ವರ ದಿವ್ಯಾರಣ್ಯ.
ರನ್ನ ಷಡಕ್ಷರಿ ಪೊನ್ನ,
ಪಂಪ ಲಕುಮಿಪತಿ ಜನ್ನ.
ಕುಮಾರವ್ಯಾಸರ ಮಂಗಳಧಾಮ,
ಕವಿಕೋಗಿಲೆಗಳ ಪುಣ್ಯಾರಾಮ.
ನಾನಕ ರಮಾನಂದ ಕಬೀರರ
ಭಾರತ ಜನನಿಯ ತನುಜಾತೆ,
ಜಯ ಹೇ ಕರ್ನಾಟಕ ಮಾತೆ.

ತೈಲಪ ಹೊಯ್ಸಳರಾಳಿದ ನಾಡೆ,
ಡಂಕಣ ಜಕಣರ ನೆಚ್ಚಿನ ಬೀಡೆ.
ಕೃಷ್ಣ ಶರಾವತಿ ತುಂಗಾ,
ಕಾವೇರಿಯ ವರ ರಂಗ.
ಚೈತನ್ಯ ಪರಮಹಂಸ ವಿವೇಕರ
ಭಾರತ ಜನನಿಯ ತನುಜಾತೆ,
ಜಯ ಹೇ ಕರ್ನಾಟಕ ಮಾತೆ.

ಸರ್ವಜನಾಂಗದ ಶಾಂತಿಯ ತೋಟ,
ರಸಿಕರ ಕಂಗಳ ಸೆಳೆಯುವ ನೋಟ!
ಹಿಂದೂ ಕ್ರೈಸ್ತ ಮುಸಲ್ಮಾನ,
ಪಾರಸಿಕ ಜೈನರುದ್ಯಾನ
ಜನಕನ ಹೋಲುವ ದೊರೆಗಳ ಧಾಮ,
ಗಾಯಕ ವೈಣಿಕರಾರಾಮ.

ಕನ್ನಡ ನುಡಿ ಕುಣಿದಾಡುವ ಗೇಹ!
ಕನ್ನಡ ತಾಯಿಯ ಮಕ್ಕಳ ದೇಹ!
ಜಯ ಭಾರತ ಜನನಿಯ ತನುಜಾತೆ,
ಜಯ ಹೇ ಕರ್ನಾಟಕ ಮಾತೆ!
ಜಯ ಸುಂದರ ನದಿ ವನಗಳ ನಾಡೆ,
ಜಯ ಹೇ ರಸಋಷಿಗಳ ಬೀಡೆ!

Romanization of Kannada

Jaya bhārata jananiya tanujāte,
jaya hē karnāṭaka māte
Jaya sundara nadi vanagaḷa nāḍē,
jaya hē rasa'ṛṣigaḷa bīḍe!

Bhūdēviya makuṭada navamaṇiye,
gandhada candada honnina gaṇiye;
rāghava madhusūdanaravatarisida
bhārata jananiya tanujāte!
Jaya hē karnāṭaka māte!

Jananiya jōguḷa vēdada ghōṣa,
jananige jīvavu ninnāvēśa!
Hasurina girigaḷa sālē,
ninnaya koraḷina māle!
Kapila patan̄jala gautama jinanuta,
bhārata jananiya tanujāte!
Jaya hē karnāṭaka māte!

Śaṅkara rāmānuja vidyāraṇya,
basavēśvara madhvara divyāraṇya.
Ranna ṣaḍakṣari ponna,
pampa lakumipati janna.
Kumāravyāsara maṅgaḷadhāma,
kavikōgilegaḷa puṇyārāma.
Nānaka ramānanda kabīrara
bhārata jananiya tanujāte,
jaya hē karnāṭaka māte.

Tailapa hoysaḷarāḷida nāḍe,
ḍaṅkaṇa jakaṇara neccina bīḍe.
Kṛṣṇa śarāvati tuṅgā,
kāvēriya vara raṅga.
Caitan'ya paramahansa vivēkara
bhārata jananiya tanujāte,
jaya hē karnāṭaka māte.

Sarvajanāṅgada śāntiya tōṭa,
rasikara kaṅgaḷa seḷeyuva nōṭa!
Hindū kraista musalmāna,
pārasika jainarudyāna
janakana hōluva doregaḷa dhāma,
gāyaka vaiṇikarārāma.

Kannaḍa nuḍi kuṇidāḍuva gēha!
Kannaḍa tāyiya makkaḷa dēha!
Bhārata jananiya tanujāte,
jaya hē karnāṭaka māte!
Jaya sundara nadi vanagaḷa nāḍe,
jaya hē rasa'ṛṣigaḷa bīḍe!

English translation

Victory to thee Mother Karnataka, daughter of Mother India!
Hail the land of beautiful rivers and forests!
Hail the abode of saints and seers!

A new jewel in the crown of Goddess Earth,
Thou art a trove of sandalwood, beauty and gold.
Victory to thee Mother Karnataka, Daughter of Mother India,
where Rama and Krishna had their incarnations.

Resonance of the Vedas is the Mother's lullaby,
Thy fervour is what giveth Her life.
Rows of green mountains are thy necklaces.
Victory to thee Mother Karnataka,
Daughter of Mother India
who is hailed by Kapila,
Patañjali, Gautama and Jina.

Thou art a sacred forest of knowledge where Shankara, Ramanuja,
Vidyaranya, Basaveswara, Madhvacharya and others dwelt.
Thou art the holy abode where Ranna,
Shadakshari, Ponna, Pampa,
Lakshmisa, Kumaravyasa and Janna were born.
Thou art the blessed resting place of many nightingale-like poets.
Victory to thee Mother Karnataka,
Daughter of Mother India
The progenitor of Nanak, Ramananda and Kabir.

'Tis the land ruled by Tailapa and Hoysalas,
The beloved home of Dankana and Jakkana.
This land blessed with the waters of Krishna,
Sharavathi, Tunga and Kaveri.
Victory to thee Mother Karnataka,
Daughter of Mother India!
The India of Chaitanya, Paramahamsa and Swami Vivekananda.

Garden of peace for all communities,
A sight that allures the connoisseurs,
A garden where Hindus, Christians, Muslims,
Parsis and the Jains can grow together;
The site where many kings like Janaka ruled;
A heaven for singers and musicians.

The body of the children of Mother Kannada!
The house where the Kannada Tongue playeth in joy!
Victory to thee Mother Karnataka,
Daughter of Mother India!
Hail the land of beautiful rivers and forests!
Hail the abode of saints and seers!

== Styles ==
The poem is set to tune by a number of Kannada composers, among which two tunes set by C. Ashwath and Mysore Ananthaswamy are the most popular ones. Recently there were some confusions and differences in opinion as to which tune should be used in rendition. A committee led by poet G. S. Shivarudrappa was asked to suggest a befitting tune for the rendition of the anthem, had recommended that the music composed by Mysore Ananthaswamy was apt. Other poets and musicians were represented in the committee, and they had considered several tunes before arriving at the decision.

On 23 September 2022, Chief Minister Basavaraj Bommai approved a proposal from the Kannada and Culture Department to officially adopt Ananthaswamy's version as the tune of the state anthem based on the recommendation of the HR Leelavathi committee.

== Controversy ==
A controversy started immediately after the poem's adoption as the Karnataka State anthem in January 2004. The government had adopted the 1994 version of the poem, which was published in a Kannada-language encyclopedia, which excluded names of saint Madhwacharya and poet Kumara Vyasa, as opposed to the 1977 version which featured them. One group, led by writers K. S. Bhagawan, S. Shivarajappa and M. B. Vishwanath argued against the government's decision, and speculated that perhaps Kuvempu might have expressed his objection to the introduction of these names when the poem was published in 1977, and hence the names were dropped in the next edition. They felt that the version in Kuvempu's KoLalu was the original and authentic, and that this version be adopted. They also feared that featuring these two names would lead to a demand for inclusion of names of other important figures by their followers, such as Manteswami and Kanakadasa among others. This argument was supported by the seer of the Tambihalli Madhava Theertha Math, who termed it "plagiarism" and stated: "... the government is acting against the Constitution and is creating unnecessary caste problems, filling people's hearts with hatred."

However, another viewpoint was for the retention of said names. Their argument was that the Kannada Sahitya Parishat had published this version of the poem when Kuvempu was alive, and had he any reservations regarding it, he would voiced it then. In the end, this version of the poem stayed, and Poornachandra Tejaswi, son of Kuvempu and holder of copyrights of Kuvempu's works, accepted the edited version.

== See also ==
- Flag of Karnataka
- List of Karnataka state symbols
- Jana Gana Mana
- Vande Mataram
- List of Indian state anthems
