= Kayo Shri Gowri =

State anthem of the Kingdom of Mysore

Kāyou Shri Gowr
English: "O Goddess Gowrī (Parvati)"
- State anthem of Kingdom of Mysore (1399–1948) and Mysore State (1947–1958)
- Lyrics: Basavappa Shastry, 1831
- Music: Basavappa Shastry, 1831
- Adopted: 1831
- Relinquished: 1950 (76 years ago)
- Succeeded by: Jaya Bharata Jananiya Tanujate

Kāyou Shri Gowrī (Kannada: ಕಾಯೌ ಶ್ರೀ ಗೌರಿ) was the official state anthem of the Kingdom of Mysore, under the rule of the Wadiyar dynasty. The anthem was composed by Basavappa Shastry (1843–1891), the court poet of the Mysore Court under the rule of Maharaja Chamarajendra Wadiyar X, who reigned between 1868 and 1894.

== History ==
In 1831, the Kingdom of Mysore was taken over by the British Raj. The king, Chamarajendra Wadiyar X ordered Basavappa Shastry, the court poet, to compose an anthem for the state.

A favourite of the Maharaja, the anthem was played when Rabindranath Tagore visited Bengaluru in 1919 to deliver his speech on the “Message of the Forests.” He had come to the city at the invitation of Albion Bannerjee who was the first counsellor under the Royal Diwan, M. Kantaraj Urs. It is believed, Tagore's song “Anondo Loke” was heavily inspired by “Kayou Shri Gowri”.

The anthem is still in use today, by the erstwhile royal family of Mysore, led by Maharaja Yaduveer Krishnadatta Chamaraja Wadiyar. It is mostly played at the Mysore Palace, when the king attends a festival or procession. It is also used and saluted by the Maharaja during the Mysore Dasara festival.

== Lyrics ==
The anthem is written in Sanskrit and propitiates the Hindu goddess Chamundeshwari, the royal deity of Mysuru, whose temple is on the Chamundi Hills. It calls upon the goddess to protect and bless the kingdom.

Kannada script

ಕಾಯೌ ಶ್ರೀ ಗೌರಿ ಕರುಣಾಲಹರಿ
ತೋಯಜಾಕ್ಷಿ ಶಂಕರೀಶ್ವರಿ

ವೈಮಾನಿಕ ಭಾಮಾರ್ಚಿತ ಕೋಮಲಕರ ಪಾದೇ
ಶ್ರೀಮಾನ್ವಿತ ಭೂಮಾಸ್ಪದೆ ಕಾಮಿತ ಫಲದೇ

ಶುಂಭಾದಿಮ ದಾಂಭೋನಿಧಿ ಕುಂಭಜ ನಿಭ ದೇವೀ
ಜಂಭಾಹಿತ ಸಂಭಾವಿತೆ ಶಾಂಭವಿ ಶುಭವೀ

ಶ್ರೀ ಜಯಚಾಮುಂಡಿಕೆ ಶ್ರೀ ಜಯಚಾಮೆಂದ್ರ
ನಾಮಾಂಕಿತ ಭೂಮೀಂದ್ರ ಲಲಾಮನ ಮುದದೇ

Latin transliteration
(ISO 15919)

kāyou śrī gowrī, karunṇā laharī,
tōyajākṣi, śankarīśvarī

vaimānika bhāmārćita komalakara pādē
śrīmānvita bhūmāspade kāmita phaladē

śumbhādima dāmbhōnidhi kumbhaja nibha dēvī
jambhāhita sambhāvite śāmbhavi śubhavī

śrī jaya ćāmuṇḍike śrī jaya ćāmendrā
nāmāṅkita bhūmendra lalāmana mudadē

English translation

O Great Goddess Gowri, thou lotus eyed Goddess benign,
Pour forth on our king thy blessings divine.

Thou lady celestial, of the loveliest grace,
Upholding all being unbounded as space.

As Indra to the demons, Agastya to the sea, Thou makes all powers of evil to flee.
All good that men seek is by thy hand outpoured, The consort co-equal of Shambho (Shiva), thy Lord.

O victorious Chamundeshwari, dark visaged lady divine,
Watch over Thy namesake of the victorious King Chamarajendra's lineage.

== Music ==
The anthem is set in Raga Kalyani (Carnatic) and Yaman (Hindustani). The western chords are in C major (Ionian mode). The anthem gained immense popularity and for a while was sung by school children across the state as their morning prayer.
