= List of Karnataka state symbols =

This is a list of state symbols of the State of Karnataka in India.

== State Symbols ==
Title	Symbol	Image	Notes
State banner	Banner of Karnataka ಕರ್ನಾಟಕದ ಬಾವುಟ; Banner of Karnataka		Karnataka does not have an officially recognised state flag. The banner shown here follows the general Indian convention for states without a distinct flag, displaying the government emblem on a plain field. A tricolour design incorporating the Gandaberunda emblem was unveiled by the state government on 8 March 2018 and forwarded to the Union Government for approval under the Emblems and Names (Prevention of Improper Use) Act, 1950, but the proposal was formally dropped by the state government in August 2019. The unofficial yellow-and-red Kannada flag, designed by Ma Ramamurthy in the 1960s, remains the widely used cultural flag of the state and is hoisted each year on Karnataka Rajyotsava.
State emblem	Emblem of Karnataka ಕರ್ನಾಟಕದ ಅಧಿಕೃತ ಲಾಂಛನ; Emblem of Karnataka		The state emblem is based on the emblem of the Kingdom of Mysore and is carried on all official correspondence of the Government of Karnataka. It consists of a red shield charged with a white two-headed mythical bird, the Gandaberunda, bordered in blue, crested by the Lion Capital of Ashoka. The shield is flanked on either side by red-maned, yellow lion-elephant Sharabha supporters standing on a green, leafy compartment.
State motto	Satyameva Jayate ಸತ್ಯಮೇವ ಜಯತೆ Truth Alone Triumphs		Satyameva Jayate is the national motto of India, taken from the Mundaka Upanishad. It is inscribed in Devanagari script on the Karnataka state emblem below the Lion Capital of Ashoka, in the same form used on the national emblem, rather than as a distinct Kannada-language motto separately adopted by the state.
State song	Jaya Bharata Jananiya Tanujate ಜಯ ಭಾರತ ಜನನಿಯ ತನುಜಾತೆ Victory to Thee, Mother Karnataka, Daughter of Mother India		Jaya Bharata Jananiya Tanujate is a Kannada poem written by Kuvempu in the 1930s. It was officially declared the state anthem (Naada Geethe) of Karnataka on 6 January 2004. The song's tune and duration were disputed for close to two decades; in September 2022 the state government approved a standardised rendition, composed by Mysore Ananthaswamy and lasting two minutes and thirty seconds, which the Karnataka High Court upheld in April 2024.
State animal	Aane ಏಷ್ಯನ್ ಆನೆ Asian elephant Elephas maximus		Aane is the largest living land animal in Asia and is found across forested regions of Karnataka, including the Western Ghats. It is listed as Endangered on the IUCN Red List.
State bird	Neelakantha Pakshi ನೀಲಕಂಠ ಪಕ್ಷಿ Indian roller Coracias benghalensis		Neelakantha Pakshi is a brightly coloured, crow-sized bird known for its acrobatic display flights, traditionally associated with the Dussehra festival in parts of the state.
State butterfly	Sardan Birdwing ಸರ್ದನ್ ಬರ್ಡ್ ವಿಂಗ್ Southern birdwing Troides minos		Sardan Birdwing is the largest butterfly species found in India, endemic to the Western Ghats. It was declared the State Butterfly of Karnataka in 2017, making Karnataka the third Indian state, after Maharashtra (2015) and Uttarakhand (2016), to designate an official state butterfly.
State flower	Kendaavare Hoo ಕೆಂದಾವರೆ ಹೂ Lotus; Nelumbo nucifera		Kendaavare Hoo is an aquatic flowering plant widely regarded as sacred in Indian religious and cultural traditions.
State tree	Gandhada Mara ಗಂಧದ ಮರ; Sandalwood; Santalum album		Gandhada Mara is a medium-sized evergreen tree valued for its fragrant heartwood, historically a major economic resource for the state and closely tied to Mysuru's traditional sandalwood and incense industries.
State fish	Korachi ಕೊರಚ, ಗಿಡ್ಪಕ್ಕೆ, ಗೆಂಡಾಯಿ, ಮಚಲು Carnatic carp Hypselobarbus carnaticus		Korachi is a commercially important cyprinid fish found in the fast-flowing rivers and streams of the state's Western Ghats region, reaching up to 60 cm in length.
State fruit	Maavina Hannu ಮಾವಿನ ಹಣ್ಣು Mango; Mangifera indica		Maavina Hannu is one of Karnataka's major horticultural crops, with the state among India's leading mango-producing regions.
State foundation day	Karnataka Rajyotsava ಕನ್ನಡ ರಾಜ್ಯೋತ್ಸವ ದಿನ; Karnataka Day		Karnataka Rajyotsava is celebrated to commemorate the formation of the state on 1 November 1956, when the States Reorganisation Act unified Kannada-speaking regions into a single state, then named Mysore, which was renamed Karnataka in 1973.

== See also ==
- List of Indian state symbols
- Emblems of Indian States
