= Punjabi ghagra suit =

Outfit worn by Women in Punjab, India

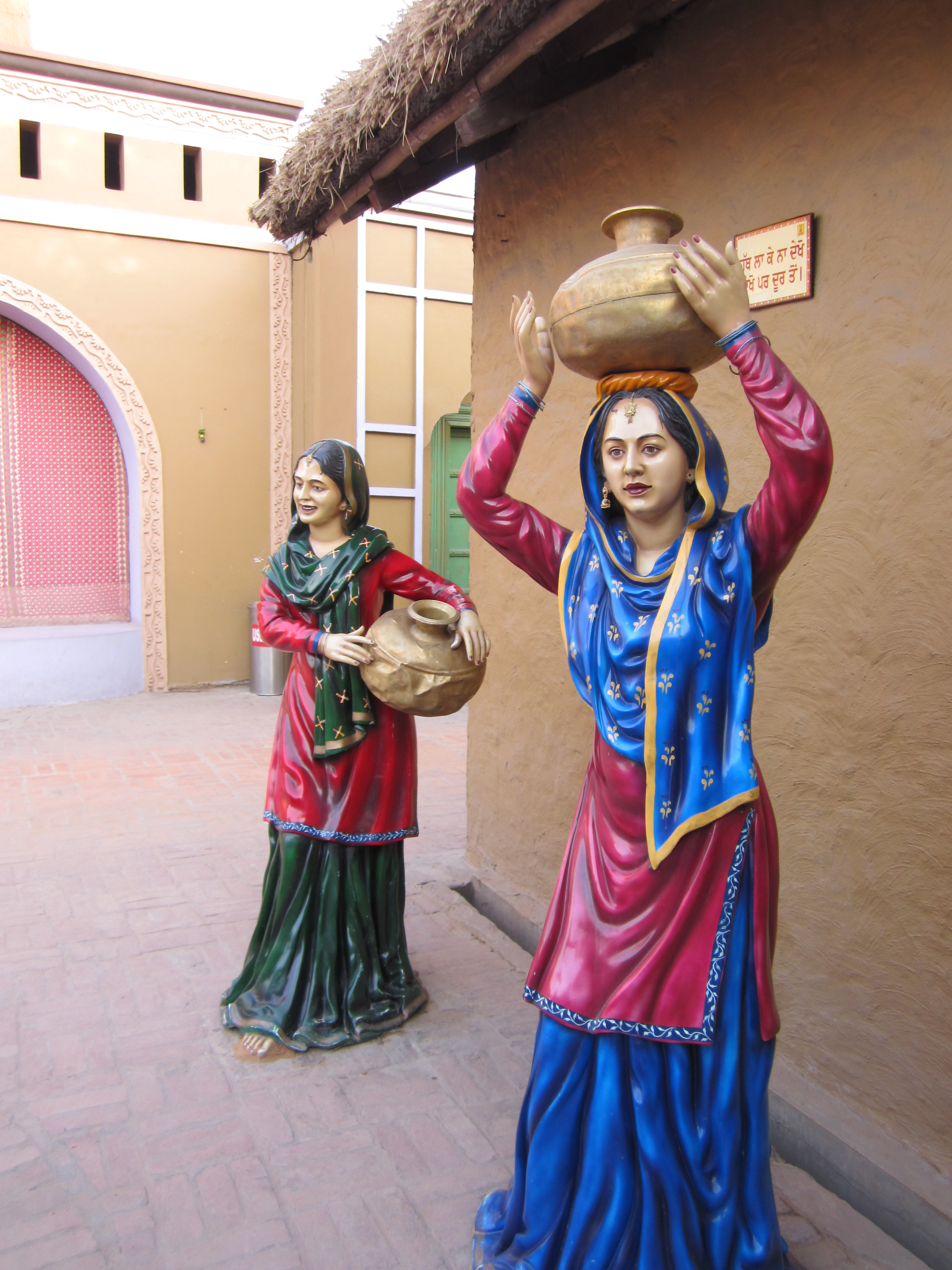
Rangla Punjab. Punjabi Ghagra

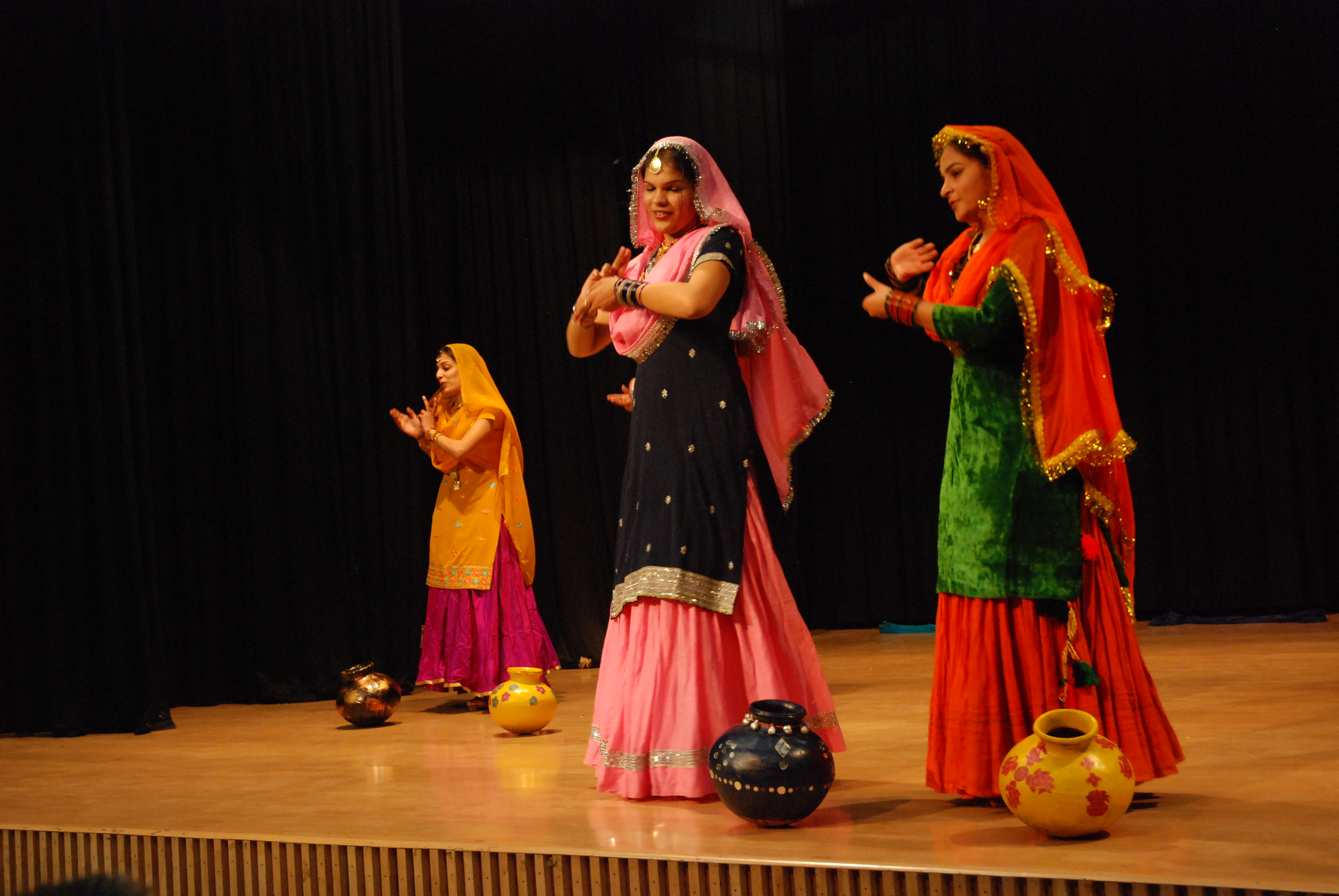
Punjabi Dance 2

The Punjabi ghagra (Punjabi: ਘੱਗਰਾ) is a four-piece outfit known as tewar or 'ti-or' which was traditionally worn by Punjabi women throughout the Punjab region with the outfit comprising a head scarf (Phulkari), kurta or kurti, ghagra (long skirt) and either a suthan (baggy trousers with a tight band around the ankles) or the Punjabi salwar (trousers). In modern times, the ghagra is worn by women in parts of Haryana, rural parts of south West Punjab, parts of Himachal Pradesh and during performances of Giddha in East Punjab.

== History ==
The ghagra has its origin in the candataka, which had become a popular garment in the Gupta period. The candataka was a men's half trousers which eventually developed into the ghagra. The intermediate formation has been described as a shirt like dress for men and women from the neck to the thighs. Candataka continued as a popular female dress in the seventh century.

== Outfit ==
The Punjabi ghagra is part of a four-piece ensemble: Phulkari, kurta/kurti, ghagra and suthan/salwar. The term tewar or ti-or suggests that the outfit was originally a three-piece ensemble which would have comprised the head scarf, kurta/kurti/angi and the ghagra. However, when preparing clothes to give to the bride, the suthan/kurta or salwar kameez outfit is counted as bewar, comprising two articles, with the head scarf not being included. Randhawa (1960) suggests that the only difference between the ghagra ensemble and the Punjabi suit outfit is the addition of the ghagra in the ghagra outfit. Accordingly, even though the Punjabi ghagra is referred to as tewar/ti-or, it is a four-piece outfit and the Punjabi suit, a three-piece ensemble.

=== Phulkari ===
The head scarf generally consists of a large Phulkari embroidered using local designs.

=== Kurta/kurti/angi/choli ===
Kurta/kurti

The upper garment is traditionally either a long kurta or a kurti which is a short coat. The kurta is a remnant of the kurtaka which was short and had side slits. It was in use in the 11th century C.E.and provides a link to the kurta of the Punjab region.

The kurti is a short cotton coat or a mini anga (dress) without side slits which is believed to have descended from the tunic of the Shunga period (2nd century B.C.). The kurti during the early 1700s buttoned to the right but later versions buttoned down the centre.

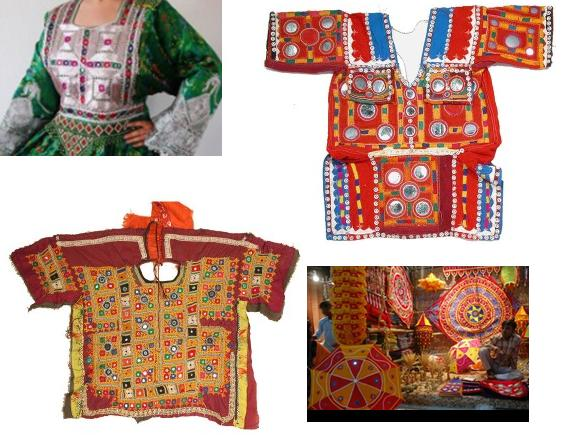
Saraiki kurti

Angi/Choli

The angi is the Punjabi name for the bodice which is a short sleeved vest which covers the breast but leaves the chest partly bare and the abdomen wholly exposed. The angi can be worn with the kurti. The angi when worn on its own is called the choli, which covers the chest and has a slip running further down in front. It has short sleeves and is tied behind. The angi differs from the choli only in having no front slip.

One design of the choli is made of strips (or patches) of many coloured silk or other material. The arms are generally bare and the stomach is left uncovered. The choli is tied at the back with strings. In the middle of the choli, a kubba is dangled which is a hollow knobby ornament with a pendant fixed onto the centre of the choli. The item used is the tukma which is a silver pendant fixed on to the ends of the choli. The choli was a popular alternative to the kurta in the 20th century, and was in use in the Punjab region since at least the 16th century. It is still popular in Multan where the Multani choli is embroidered in different colours or hand printed, tied at the front or the back. Modern versions of the choli are also worn.

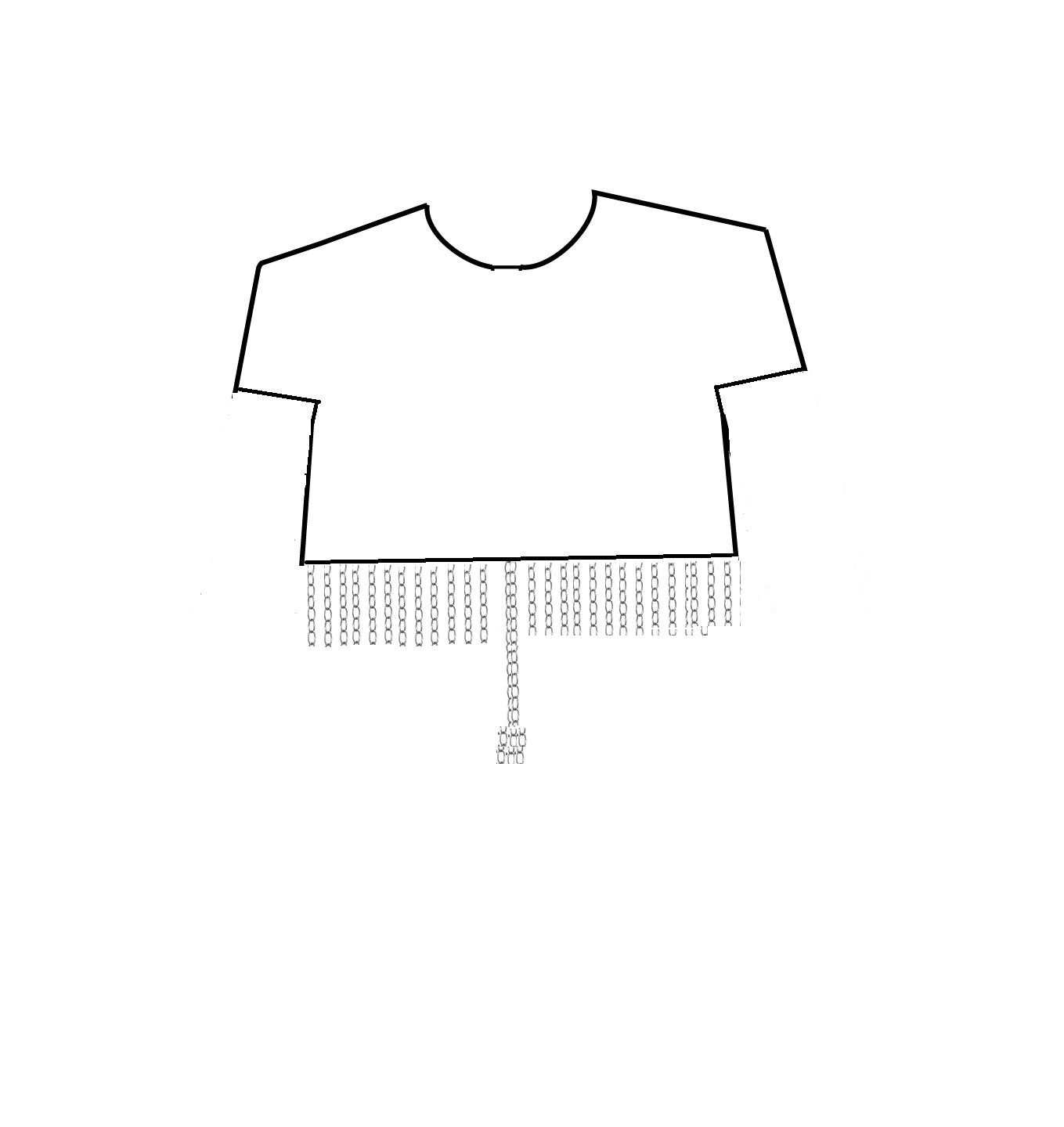
Punjabi Choli with jewellery

=== Ghagra ===
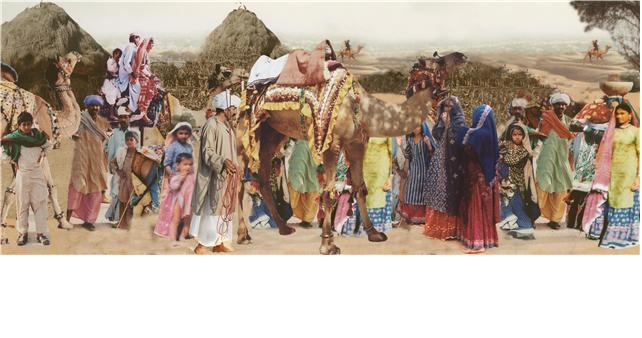
Saraiki Tradition women wearing ghagra west Punjab

The ghagra is a long full skirt which can vary from 9 to 25 yards The picture on the right shows the styles worn by Saraiki speaking women in west Punjab. The ghagra is traditionally worn by women of all communities.

In Lahore and East Punjab, the ghagra however was only worn when going outdoors or in some areas, when going to another village in which case the kurta/kurti would be replaced by a choli. Women were expected to continue to wear the ghagra over the suthan or the salwar until old age or until at least the eldest child got married. It was also customary to wear the ghagra on festive occasions and when attending funerals. It is still used by elderly ladies and is worn on special occasions. Older Punjabi women living in the United Kingdom recall wearing the ghagra over the salwar.

The materials used for making ghagras can either be chiffon or cotton. The edge is finished with either a row of pin tucks, embroidery, gota or by putting a border of daryai (stiffened cloth). The soft cotton ghagra is traditionally starched (maandi) along with mica or vark which shines in the sun. Vark is similar to thin layers of stiff paper which is crushed and added to maandi (starch). Other materials used for ghagras are hari-shael, latha, saatan (satin), embroidered phulkari, parachute cloth etc. Parachute cloth is a silky material and perhaps similar to the textile used to make parachutes. For formal occasions the ghagra is made of expensive material with some embellishments like gota or embroidery.

=== Suthan/Salwar ===
It is traditional to wear either a suthan or a salwar under the ghagra.

== Usage ==
The Punjabi ghagra was envogue in West Punjab and East Punjab on a wide scale during the 1960s. However, during this time, the Punjabi ghagra began to decrease in popularity and the Punjabi Salwar Suit came to be worn on its own, albeit in some villages in East Punjab the Punjabi ghagra is still worn at funerals. Further, the ghagra is still worn in parts of Haryana, parts of Himachal Pradesh and West Punjab.

== Lehnga ==
A variation of the ghagra is the lehenga which is traditionally made of finer material than the ghagra as noted in 1878. The lehenga was traditionally popular in urban areas and it is still customary for Punjabi brides to wear the lehngha.

== Ghagri ==
A shorter version of the ghagra is the ghagri which does not drop to the ankles. This version is traditionally worn in Haryana and Himachal Pradesh but began to lose popularity during the 1960s. In the plains of Punjab, the ghagri was an indoor item.

== Luanchari ==
Luanchari is a full-dress made of two parts stitched together: the upper part is the choli and the lower is the lehanga. It is traditional garment worn by Gaddis of Himachal Pradesh.

=== Photo gallery ===
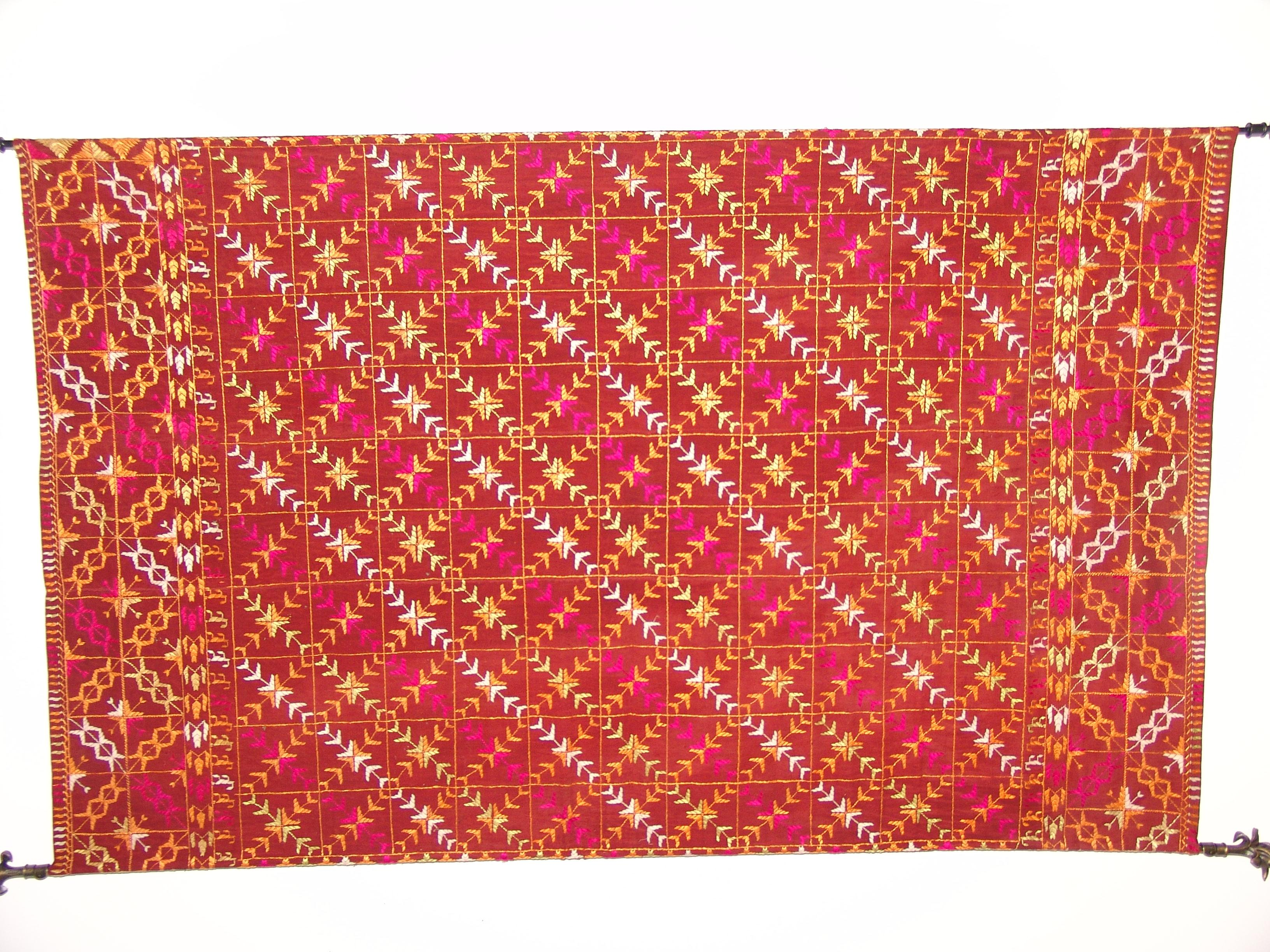
Phulkari from Patiala

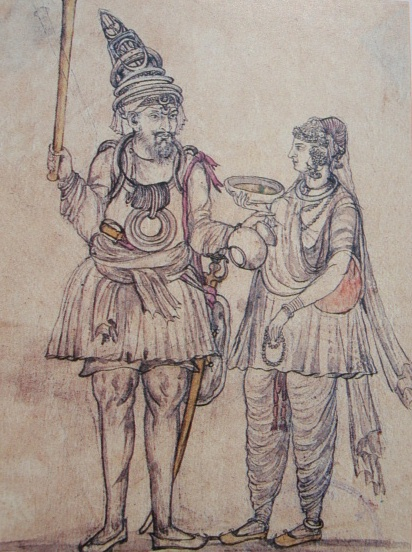
Sketch of a woman (right) wearing a suthan

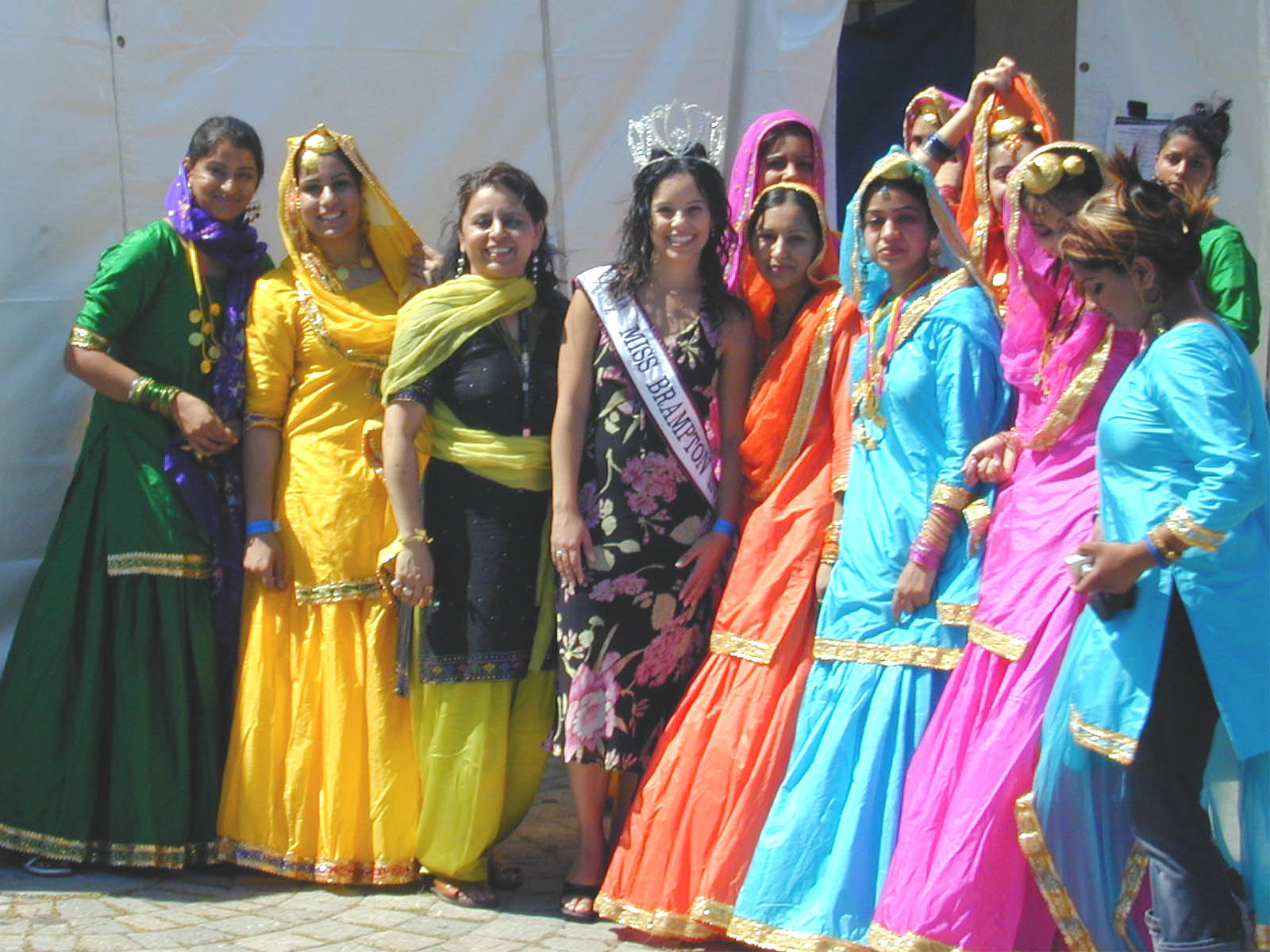
Punjabi kurta and lehenga

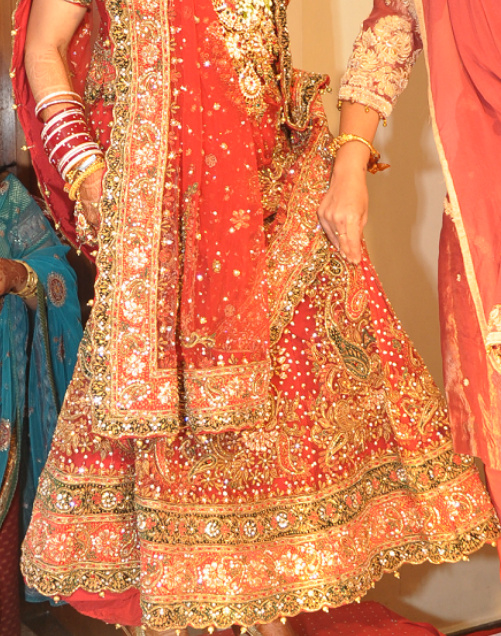
Bridal lehenga with Gota Embroidery

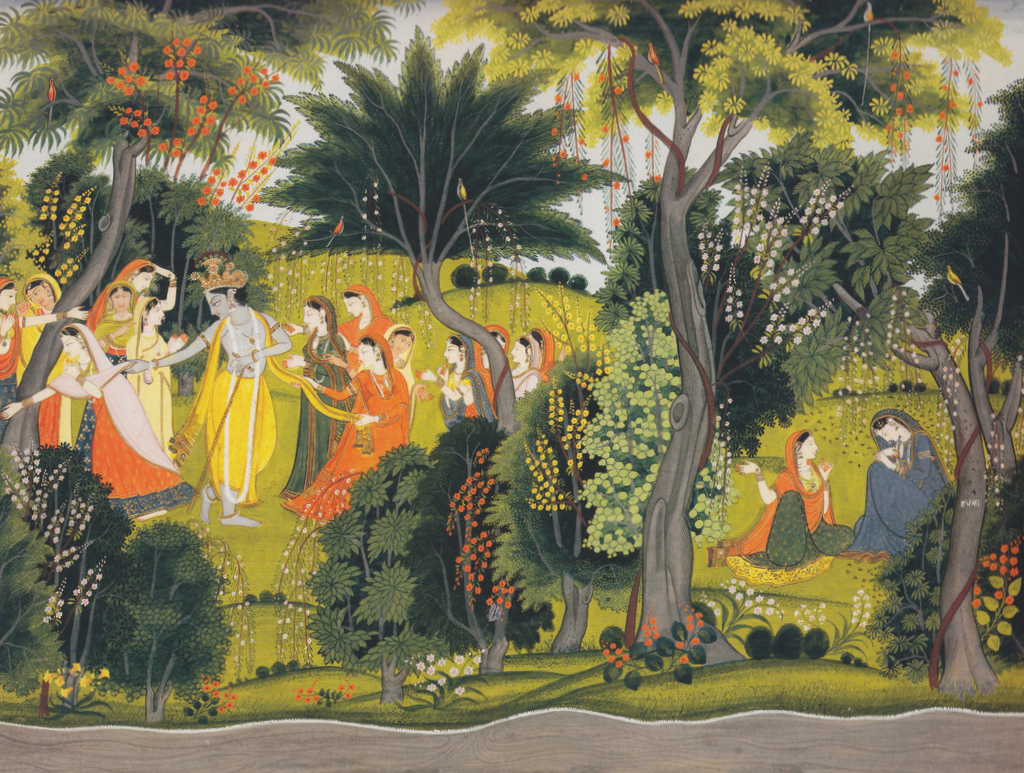
Pahari painting depicting women in Luanchari. ca.1760

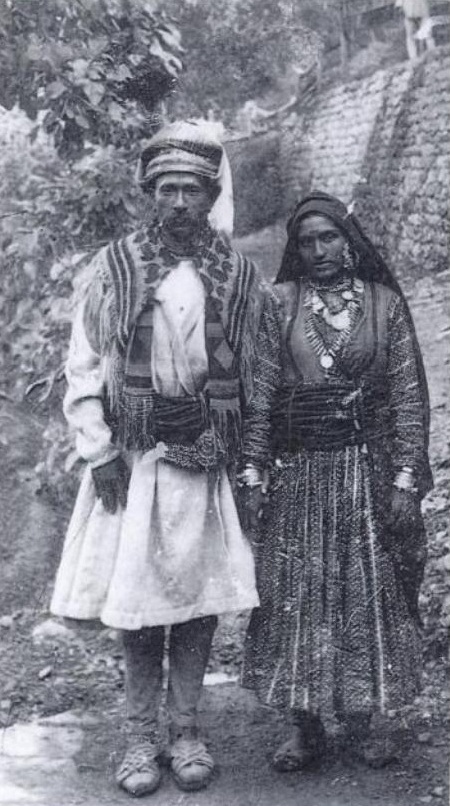
Himachal woman in Luanchari

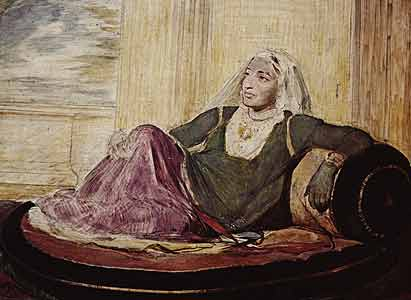
Rani Jindan (1817-1863) in a ghagra and kurta

== See also ==
- Ghagra choli
