= Ghagra choli =

Traditional clothing of women from the Indian subcontinent

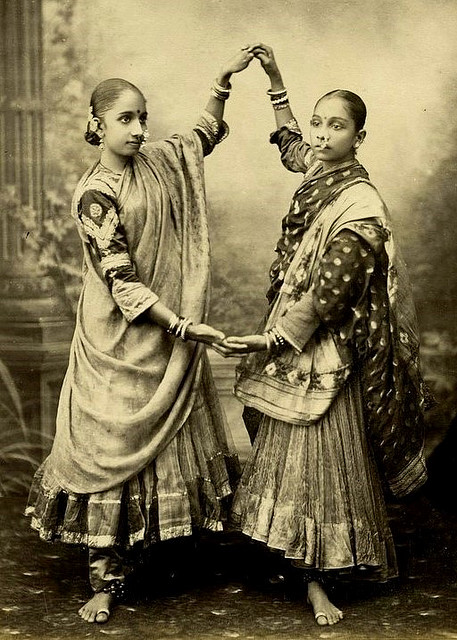
Women in ghagra choli, c. 1872

Ghagra choli (also known as lehenga choli and chaniya choli) is a type of skirt and blouse pair of ethnic clothing for women from the Indian subcontinent, notably in the Indian states of Rajasthan, Gujarat, Madhya Pradesh, Uttar Pradesh, Bihar, Haryana, Punjab, Himachal Pradesh, Uttarakhand, Jammu and Kashmir and in the Terai plains of southern Nepal. It is a combination of the ghagra or lehenga (long skirt) and the choli (blouse).

In Punjab, the lehenga is traditionally worn with a kurti. In contemporary and modern usage lehenga choli is the widely used term by fashion designers, trend setters, and boutiques in India, since ghagra is synonymous with the half-slip (petticoat) worn as an undergarment below the sari.

== Terms and history ==
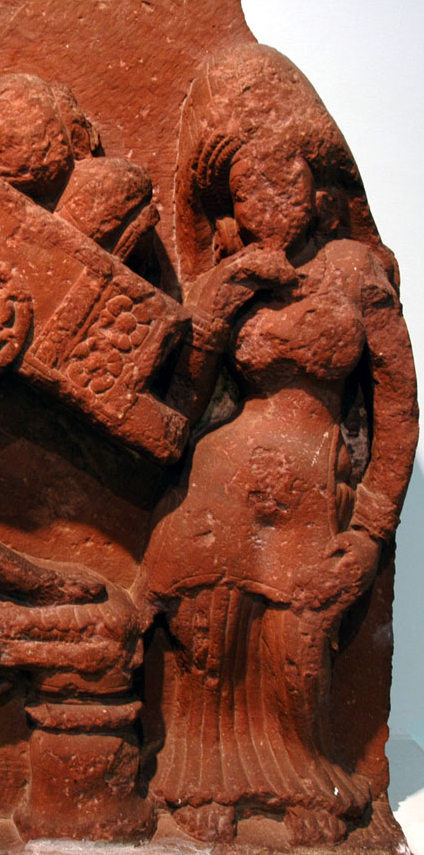
Gupta-period depiction of women in ancient form of ghagra and long choli, 320 CE–550 CE, Uttar Pradesh, India.

Historically, the gagra choli evolved from the three-piece attire worn by women in ancient India. The attire consisted of the antriya lower garment, the uttariya veil worn over the shoulder or head and stanapatta a chest band, which is mentioned in Sanskrit literature and Buddhist Pali literature during the 6th century B.C.

=== Choli ===
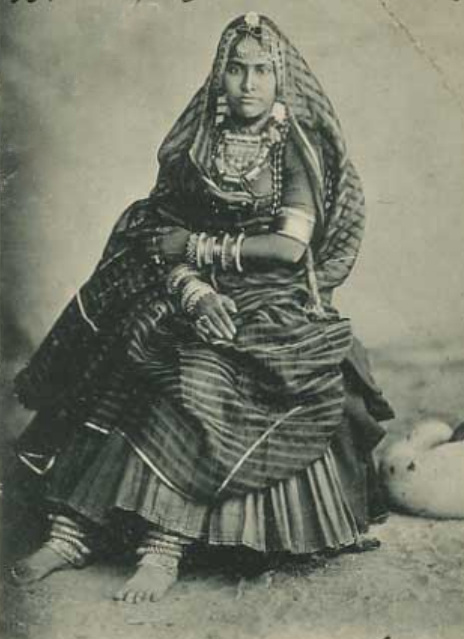
Woman in traditional style of gagra choli worn in the Hindi belt.

A choli, (ravike in South India) is a midriff-baring blouse commonly worn with a sari attire. It evolved from the ancient stanapatta (also known as kanchuki) and is cut to fit tightly around the body with its short sleeves and low neck. The choli is usually cropped, allowing exposure of the navel; the cropped design is particularly well suited to wear in the hot summers of the Indian subcontinent.

=== Ghagra, lehenga or chaniya ===
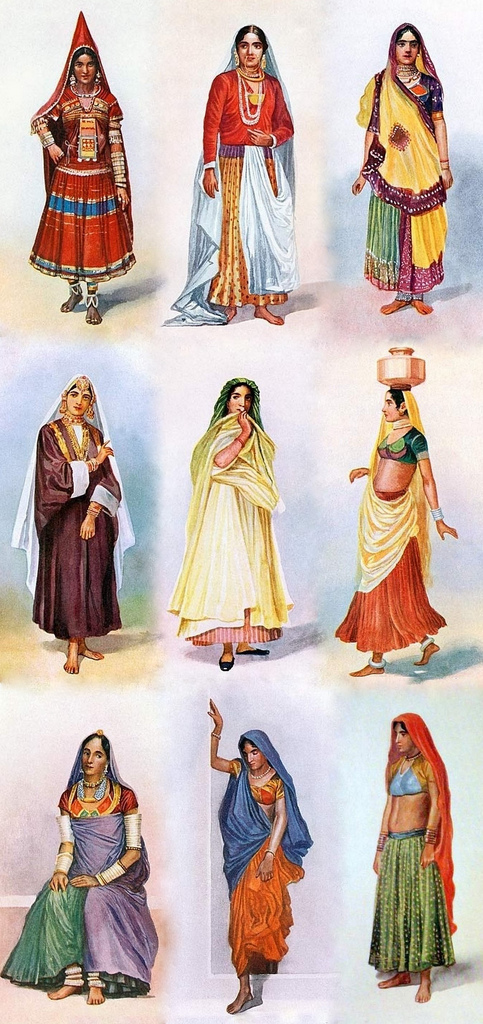
Illustration of different regional variations of ghagra choli worn by women in India

Lehenga, gagra/ghagra (Hindi: ghāghrā) also chaniya (known as pavadai in Tamil) is a form of skirt that is long, embroidered and pleated. It is secured at the waist or hips and leaves the lower back and midriff bare. The ancient version of skirt or ghagri evolved from bhairnivasani, which in turn evolved from the antariya when stitching on one side became tubular and was worn gathered together at the waist, and held by a girdle. This was one of the earliest forms of a clumsily stitched skirt. It was worn using a nada or drawstring. The ghagri was a narrow skirt 6 feet (1.8 m) long—the same length as the original antriya—and can still be seen worn by Jain nuns in India.

Until the early 20th century, women irrespective of class largely wore gagras that reached down to ankles, especially in the Hindi belt. This was largely due to jeweled toes indicating the marital status of women, as both married and unmarried women observed the ghoonghat veil. Gagras were made out of two to three layers of coarse khadi fabric which created the large flared look and remained largely plain but were decorated with gota and badla embroidery on special occasions. Most commonly used dyes were indigo, lac and turmeric. This style can still be seen in rural areas of Haryana, Uttar Pradesh, Bihar and Madhya Pradesh particularly during folk festivals.

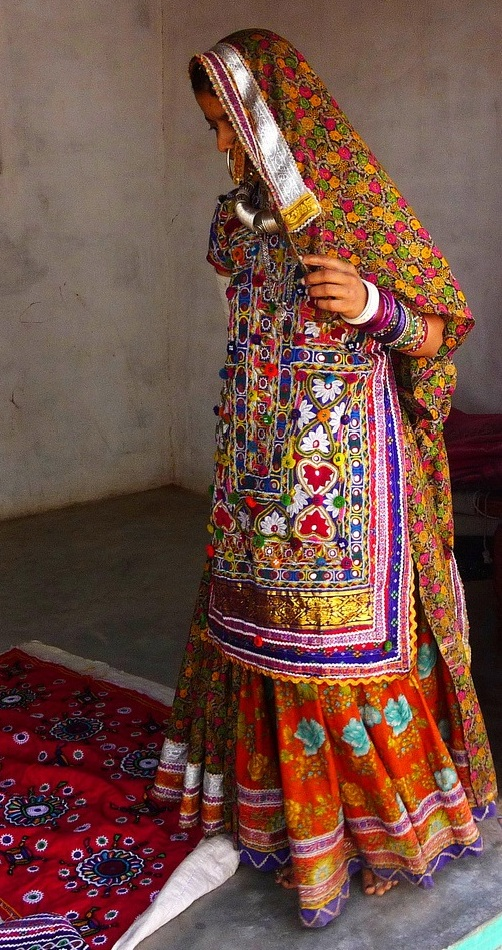
Woman in gagra and long front covering choli tied at the back

=== Dupatta ===
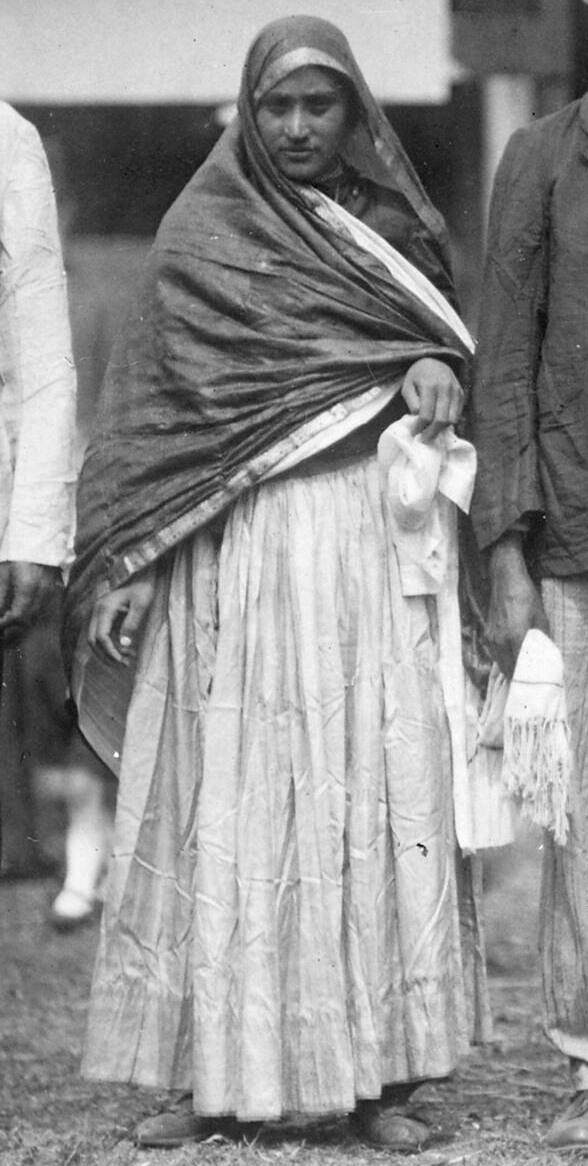
Sikh woman wearing ghagra and dupatta (chunni), detail from a photograph of Sikh visitors from India in Adelaide, Australia, 1922

The dupatta (also known as chunni, chunri, or odni) is a scarf that is like a shawl and is worn with the gagra and choli. It is also used as part of the women's shalwar kameez costume. It is an evolved form of the uttariya. Until the early 21st century, the dupatta was the most decorative part of gagra choli, while the rest of the garment was plainer, especially if the gagra was an everyday one. Dupatta is worn in many regional styles across India. The most common style since early medieval times was to pleat the dupatta on one end, so it could be anchored by tucking it into the front waist of the gagra. The loose end is then wrapped across the waist and/or draped diagonally across the upper body to fall over the shoulder, or up and over to cover the head. This is similar to the way a sari is generally worn. Women farming or doing manual work tuck both ends of the dupatta into their choli.

The dupatta is traditionally seen as a symbol of modesty, as its main purpose is to serve as a veil. There is no single way of wearing it, so as time passed and fashion changed, the styling of the dupatta also evolved.

== Fabrics ==
The Ghagri-Choli are made of a number of fabrics such as silk, cotton, khadi, georgette, crape, net, satin, brocade and chiffon. Although designers have successfully used various fabrics for lehenga, silk is still the preferred fabric.

== Decorative stitching ==
Apart from the fabric, decorative stitching patterns also play a role. Lehengas come with a wide variety of decoration and embroidery work like gota, phulkari, shisha, chikankari, zari, zardozi, nakshi, kundan, etc. For festivals like Navaratri, the ethnic shisha embroidery is popular with a bit of patchwork. For formal wear and weddings, the embroidery is heavier in pearls, silk, sequins and zari.

Kutch embroidery is an evolving expression of the craft and textile traditions of the Rabaris, a nomadic tribe in Gujarat. Kutch embroidery is unique in the sense that a net is woven on a cloth using thread. The net is then filled in using the same thread by intricate interlocking stitches. The patterns are usually built around geometric shapes. This embroidery follows its own traditional design logic and juxtaposition of colours and motifs. The Rohanas tribals of Kutch specialise in skirt work. The Sodhas use a geometric style for their embroidery. The Garacia Jats are experts in tiny embroidery on the yoke, which intermingles with red, orange, blue and green threads. The Dhanetah Jats love embroidering broad pear-shaped mirrors using orange, black, yellow and red in chain stitch.

== Festive attire ==
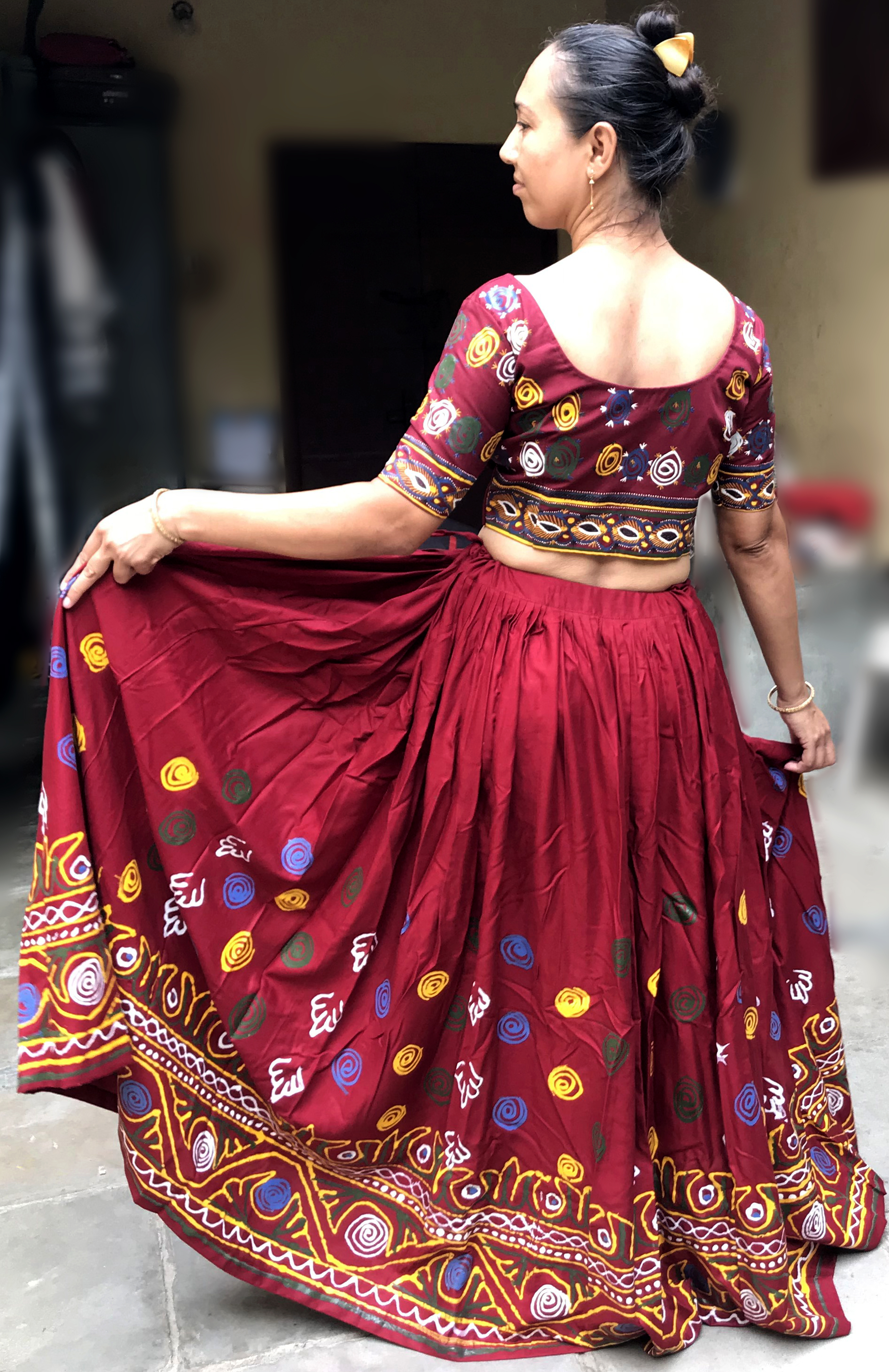
Traditional Rogan painting Ghagra choli, hand painted by Ashish Kansara

The lehenga choli is the favourite female apparel worn during festivals, weddings or special events in India. This is due to traditions as well as of the fact that it is available in a number of fabrics with many different decorative choices. Traditionally the sari and the lehenga choli are the most popular garments for the bride in India. This is a common bridal attire mostly in North India and is also the traditional wear of Garba festival in Gujarat. Traditional Rogan hand painted (by Ashish Kansara) and embroidered Chaniya choli wear of festival and wedding in Gujarat.

== Ritu Kala – significance in rite of passage ==
In southern India, coming of age ceremony or rites of passage are celebrated when a girl reaches puberty. She wears langa voni during the first part of the ceremony and then she is given her first sari, which she wears during the second half of the ceremony. This marks her transition into womanhood.

The tradition of presenting langa voni begins with the girl's first naming ceremony called Namakaran and her first rice feeding ceremony called Annaprashana. She receives her last one at her coming of age ceremony. Langa voni is traditional clothing for unmarried girls in southern India.

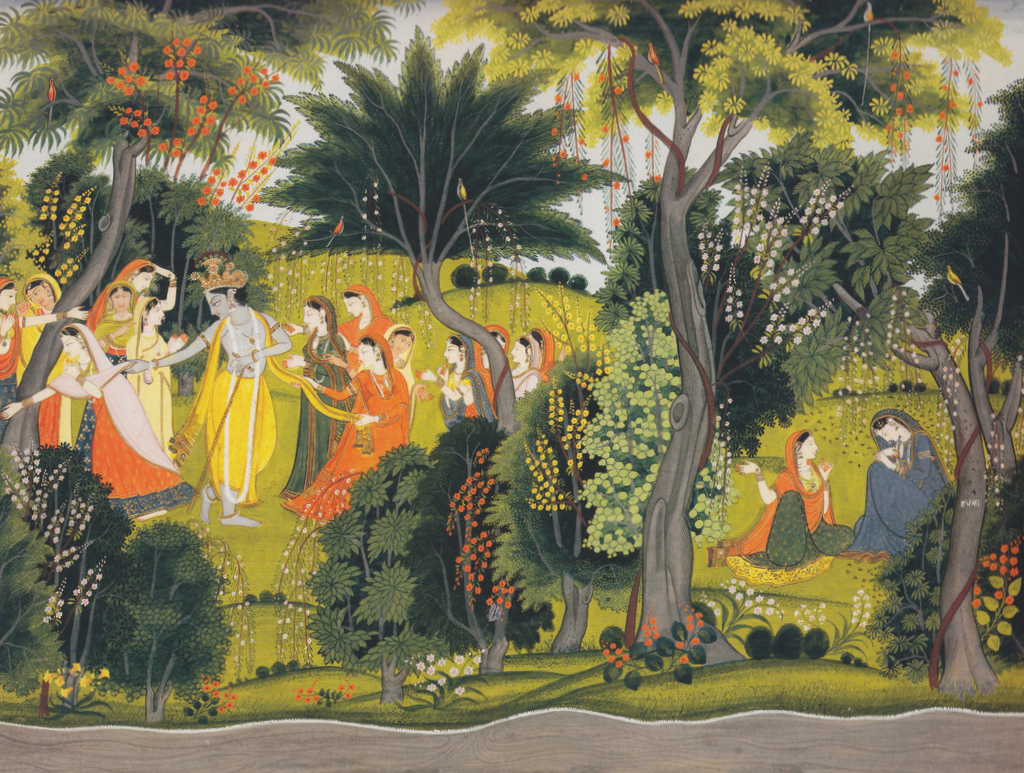
Pahari painting depicting women in Luanchari. c.1760

== Luanchari ==
Luanchari is a full-dress garment. The luanchari is made up of two parts. The upper part is called choli, and is made of the same fabric as of the lehanga, but it is not uncommon to find the two pieces of the garment in different colours. The choli is stitched to the lehanga, to make a one-piece luanchari. This is commonly worn by the women in Pahari miniatures, and is quite similar to lehanga. It may take over 21 yards of cloth to make a complete luanchari. It is a traditional garment worn by Gaddis of Himachal Pradesh.

== Gallery ==
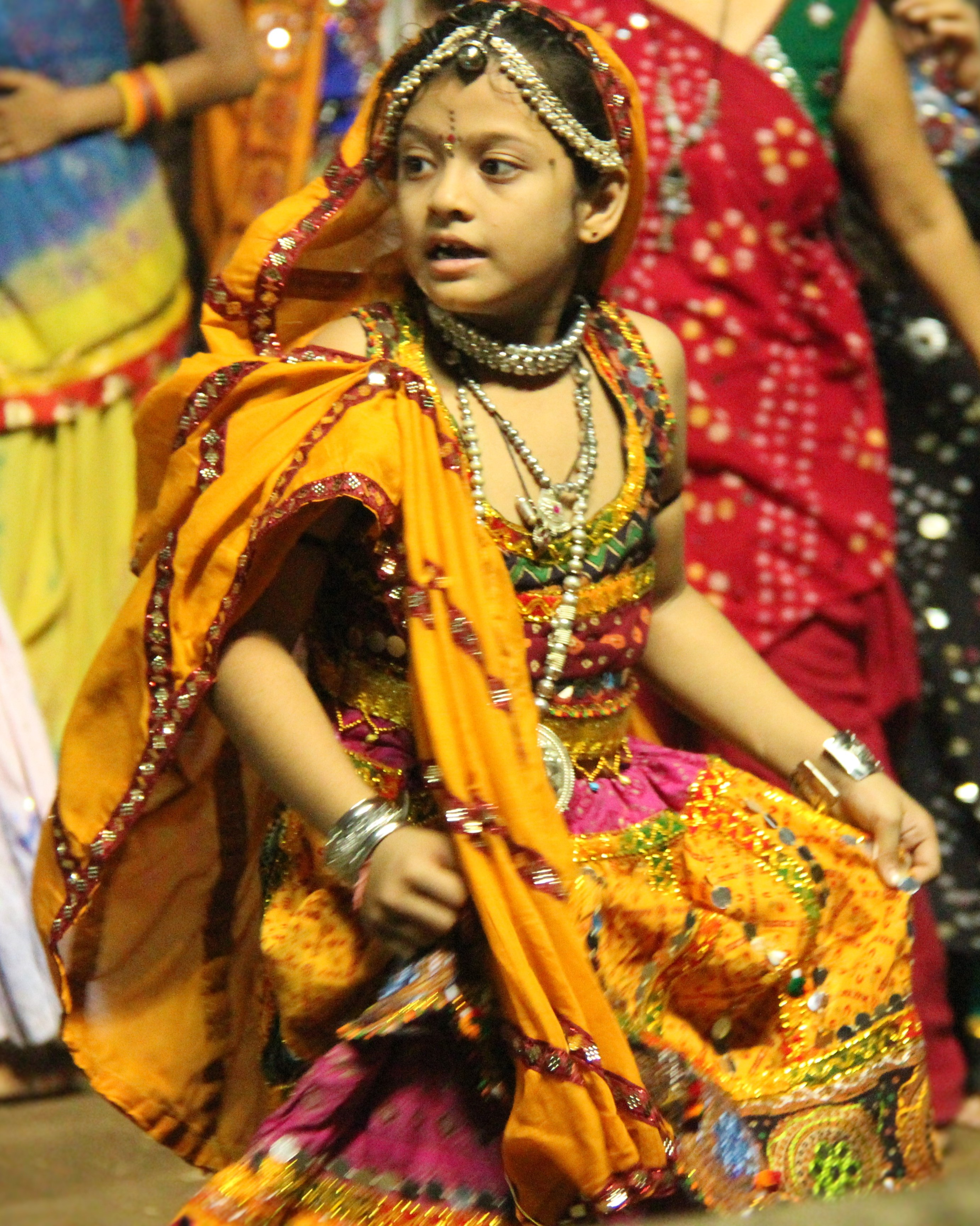
Little girl dressed in gagra choli during garba in Vadodara

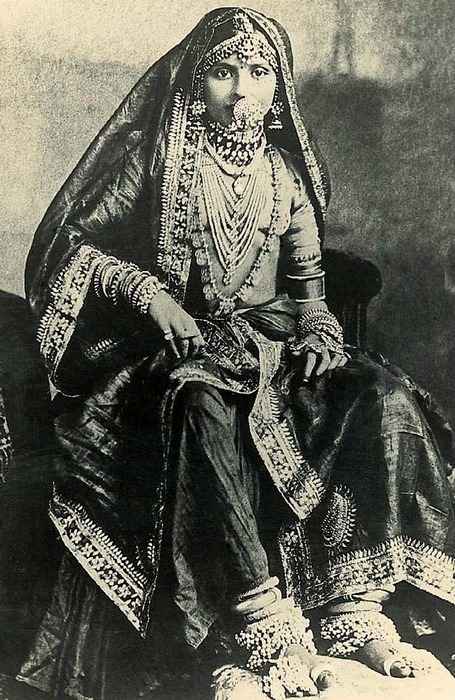
Woman in gagra choli

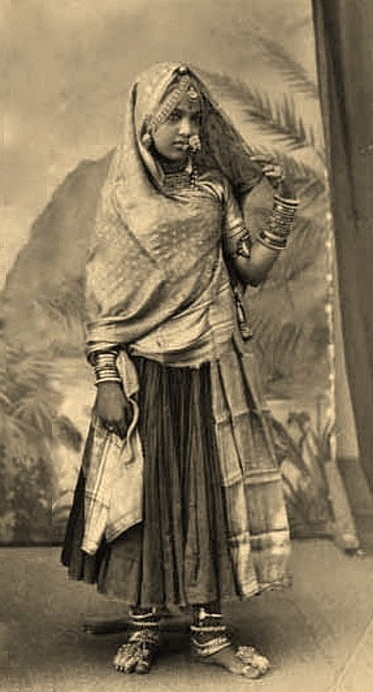
Woman in gagra choli

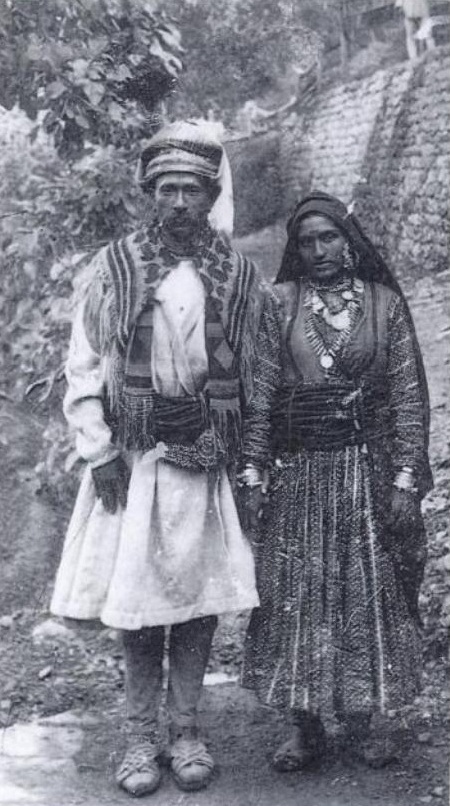
Himachal woman in luanchari

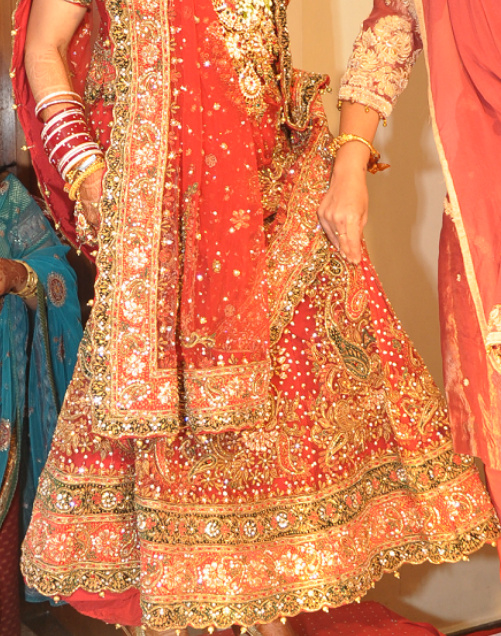
Bridal gagra with gota embroidery

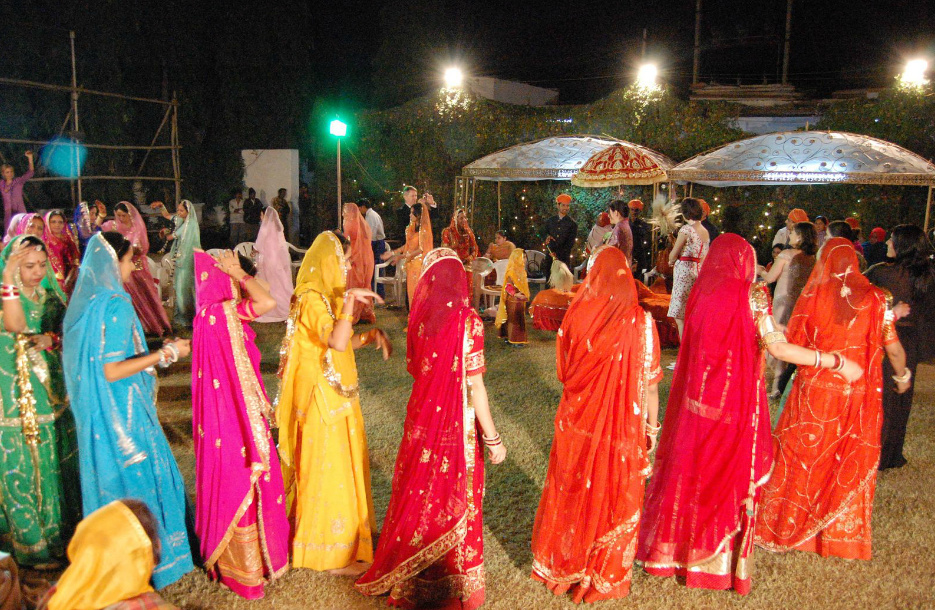
Women dancing in gagra choli during wedding in Delhi

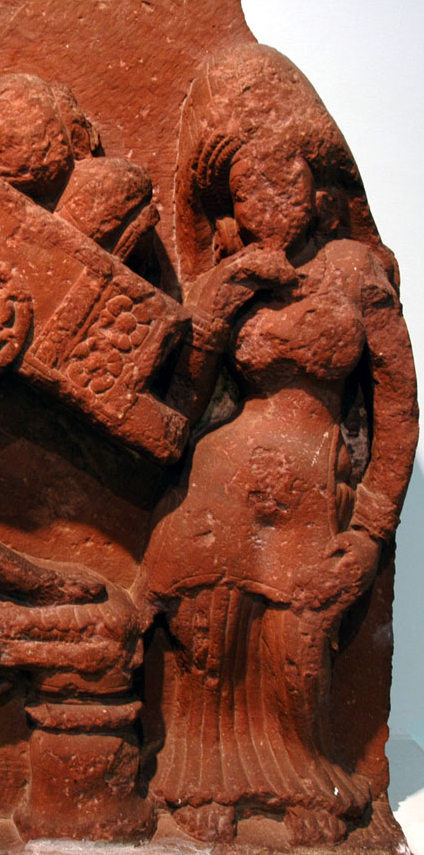
Plaque depicting ancient form of long choli and gagra worn during Gupta Empire

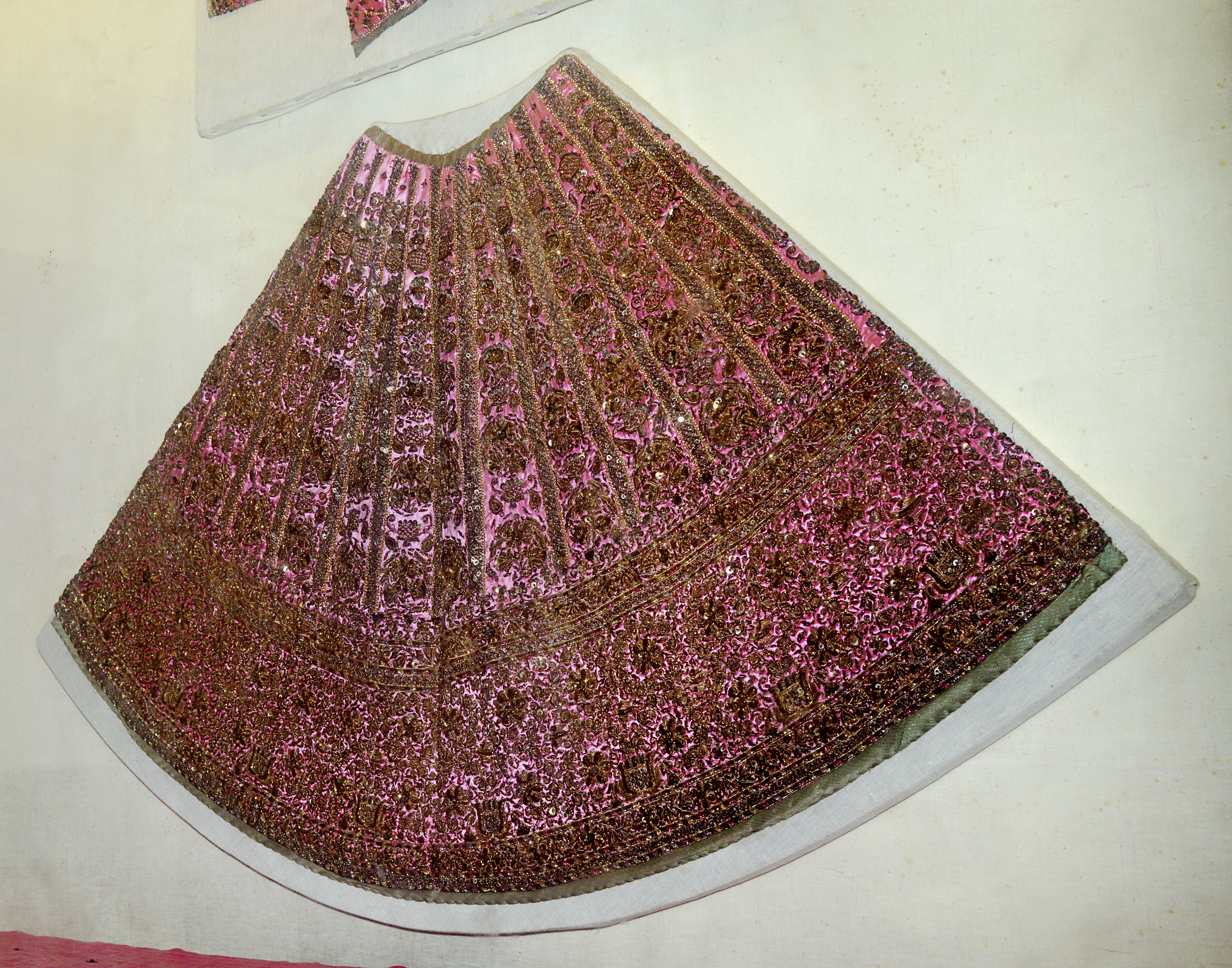
Gagra with badla embroidery from 1800s

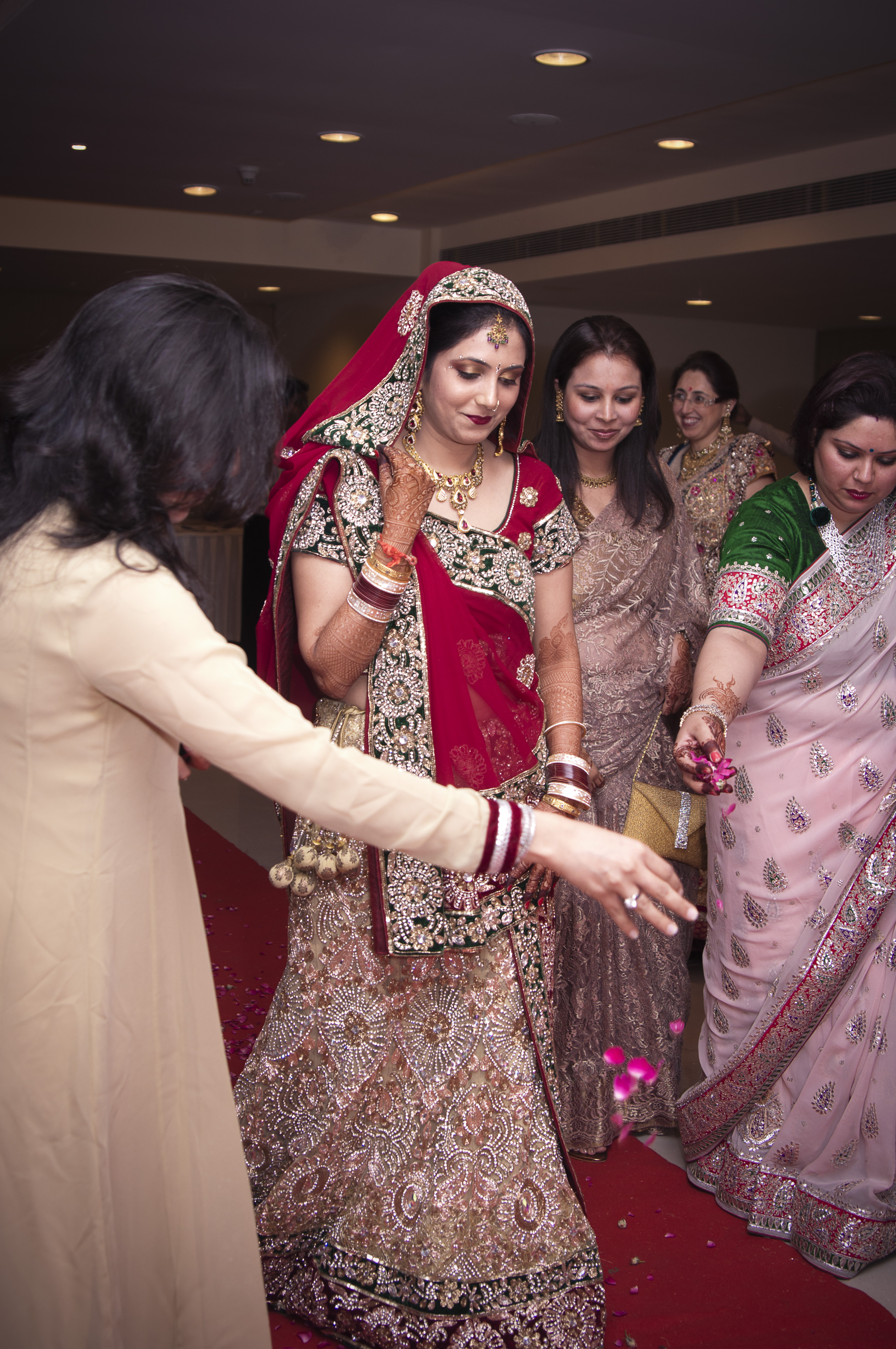
Bride in ghagra choli or lehenga

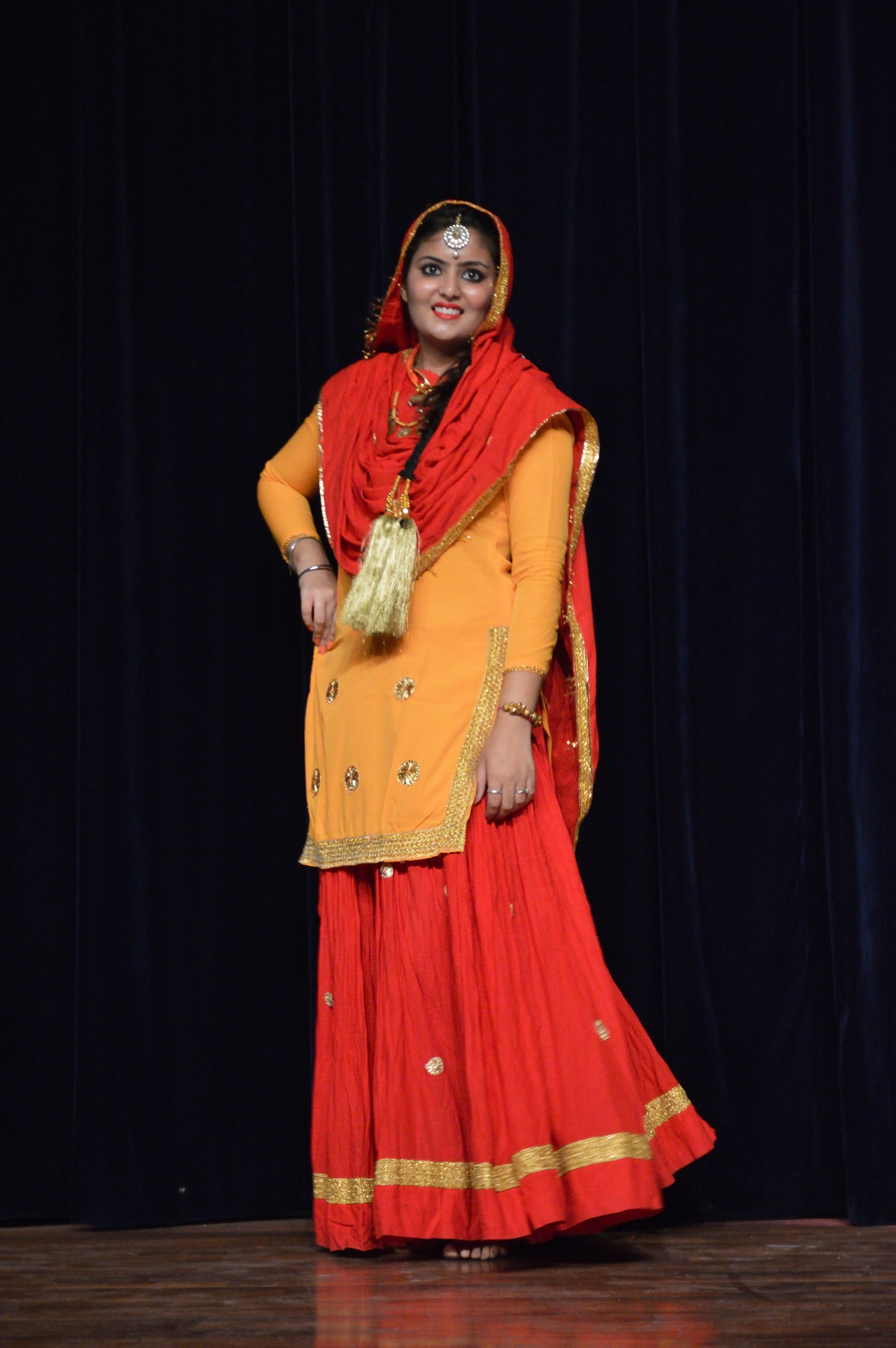
Punjabi ghagra

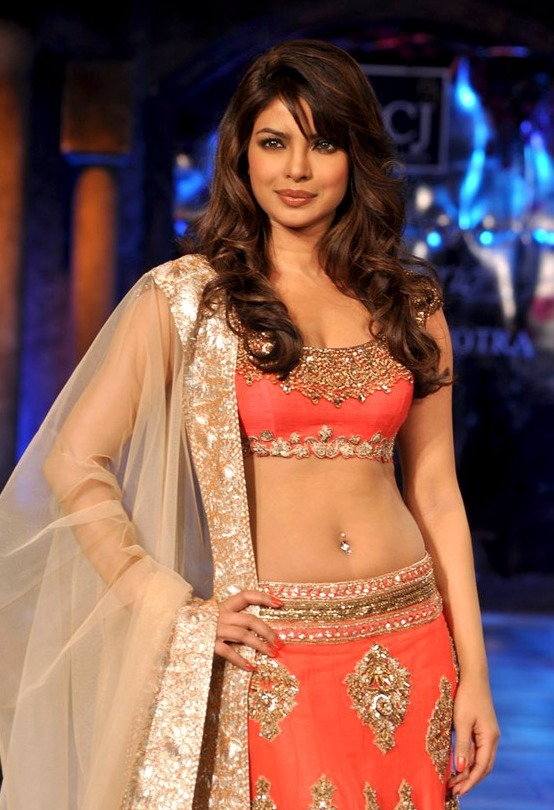
Priyanka Chopra in a navel-baring choli and ghagra

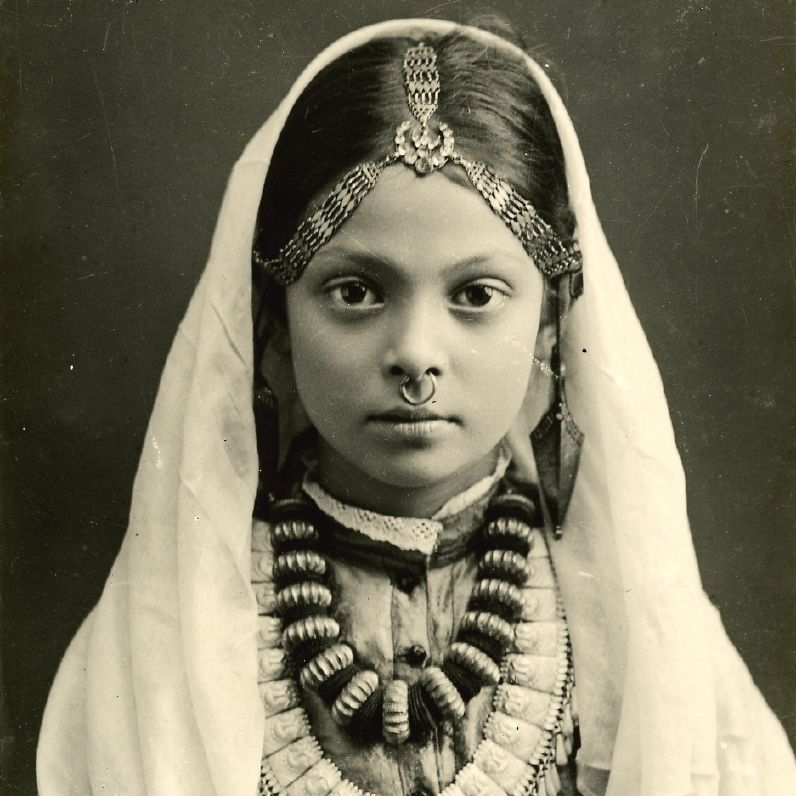
A Khas Nepali woman in a gagra choli that is also called Gunyu choli or Faria.

== See also ==
- Langa voni
- Gharara
- Punjabi ghagra suit
- Sari
- Shalwar kameez
- Kurta
- Dhoti
- Kaupinam
