= Salwar =

Traditional loose trousers worn in South Asia

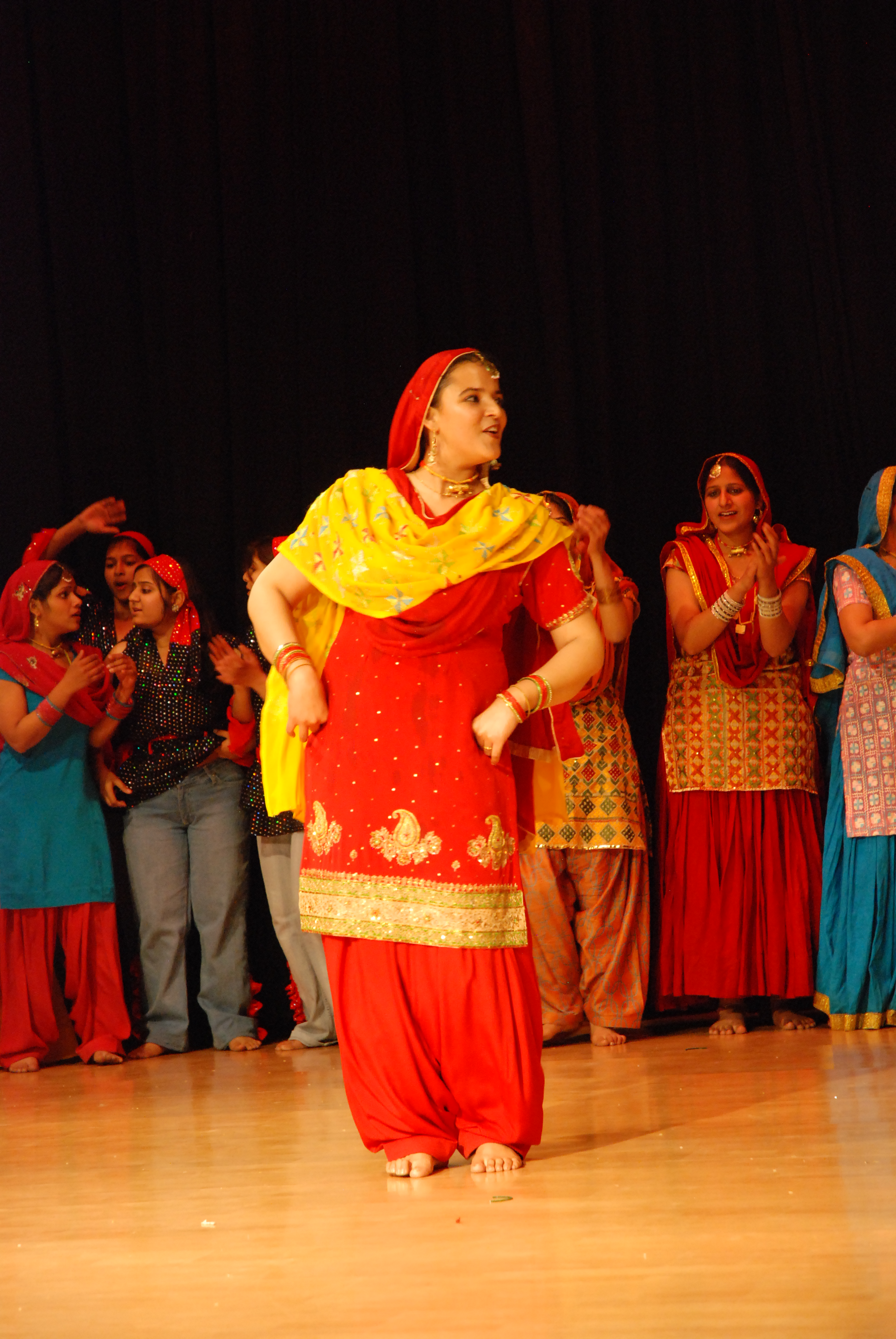
- Woman wearing a traditional Punjabi salwar
- Material: Materials: Cotton; Polyester; Wool; Linen; Denim; Nylon; Rayon; Spandex; Viscose; Elastane; Silk; Corduroy; Twill; Gabardine; Flannel; Velvet; Hemp; Georgette; Chiffon; Crepe; Satin
- Place of origin: Central Asia
- Manufacturer: Various

Salwar or shalwar is cloth worn from the waist to the ankles, covering both legs separately. It is the lower-garment of the shalwar kameez suit which is widely-worn in South Asia. It is known for its lively hues, rich fabrics, and embroidery. The outfit has been a part of Punjabi tradition of India and Pakistan for centuries. It is also the national dress of Pakistan, and since the later 1960s, the salwar is being used in government offices in Pakistan. Salwar can be distinguished from the Punjabi suthan which is shorter than the salwar.

== Types ==
- Afghani shalwar – tends to be loose.
- Anarkali shalwar – slim fitted salwar.
- Peshawari shalwar – is very loose down to the ankles.
- Balochi shalwar – has a very roomy salwar using large lengths of cloth.
- Punjabi shalwar – is straight
- Patiala shalwar – is wide at the top but fits closely to the legs and is gathered at the ankles.
- Saraiki shalwar – is very wide and baggy with many voluminous folds.
- Sindhi salwar – is less plaited at the waist.
- Sindhi kancha – has long pancha (cuffs) at ankles.

== History ==
=== Early history ===
Shalwar is a lower garment, with different regions having different types. The earliest form of the shalwar originated in Central Asia and its use was spread to South Asia as well as the Arab world, Turkey and wherever the Turks established their empires in the 12th century. The Ottomans spread the use of the salwar throughout its empire. Salwar was brought in South Asia after the arrival of Muslims in the 13th century. It was first worn by Mughal nobles.

In Punjab, there is a similar but older dress similar to the salwar known as suthan. The Punjabi suthan suit which is made up of the head scarf, kurta/kurti and Punjabi suthan. There are also the Jammu dress and the churidar. The term salwar kameez also includes the Kashmiri Phiran/suthan outfit.

In the Punjab region, the salwar was made using a large amount of material but had no pleats or folds. The large salwar eventually gave rise to the Punjabi salwar.

=== Punjabi salwar ===
In its strictest sense, the salwar is baggy and loose straight down the legs, and gathered loosely at the ankles. During the medieval period, people adopted the Iraqi style of salwar in Multan and neighbouring Sindh. This type of salwar is traditionally very baggy and gathered at the ankles. It is still worn by the Kurdish community in Iraq. The presence of the baggy salwar was noted by Alberuni in the 11th century A.D. and continued to be envogue between the 16th and 18th centuries C.E. in Multan

The Multani salwar is similar to the loose Punjabi suthan. Therefore, the distinction between the loose Punjabi suthan and the loose Multani salwar is fine and centres on the tight ankle band in the suthan, and on the suthan beginning to fit closer to the legs below the knees.

The original Punjabi loose salwar was not as baggy as the Multani style but was wide, with the gathering at the ankles being wide enough to cover the feet. Originally, up to ten yards of cloth was used to make Punjabi salwars. The original Punjabi salwar was also not as baggy as other forms of the salwar, such as the type worn in Afghanistan (partug), the Balochi salwar, or the loose Punjabi suthan, and gathers more quickly below the knees and ends in a tight band. Eventually the modern Punjabi salwar came into being which is slim fitting and does not have wide ends as before.

Another style of salwar is the Pothohari salwar of the Pothohar area of the Punjab region. The Pothohari salwar retains the wideness of the Punjabi suthan. The kameez is also wide. The chunni is a remnant of the large chadar popular in West Punjab known as salari and the large Phulkari worn in various areas of the Punjab region. However, the Pothohari salwar suit did not attain universal acceptance. The Bahawalpuri salwar is also wide and baggy with many folds. The material traditionally used for the Bahawalpuri shalwar and suthan is known as Sufi, which is a mixture of cotton warp mixed with silk weft and gold threads running down the material.

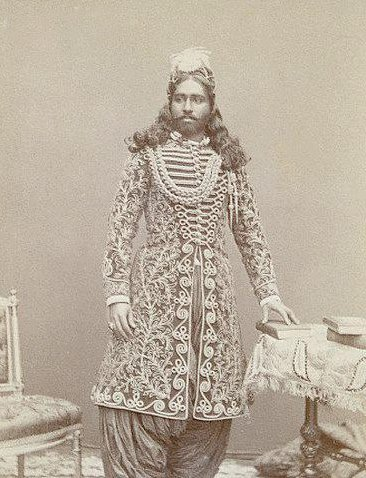
Nawab Muhammad of Bahawalpur (1868–1900) wearing a loose Bahawalpuri salwar

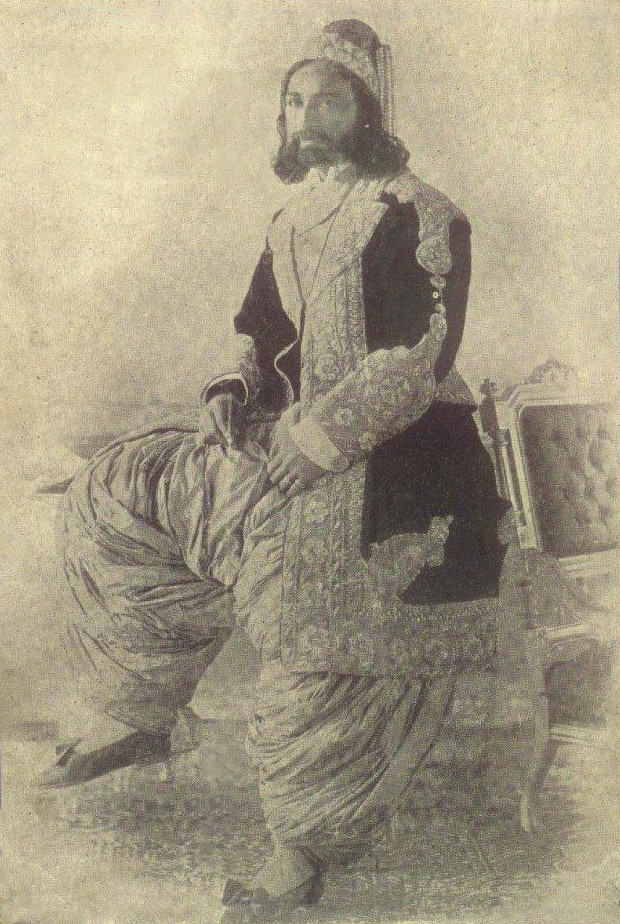
Prince Suba Sadiq Abbasi, Bahawalpur

=== Punjabi kameez ===
The Punjabi Kameez is a traditional outfit worn by both men and women in the Punjab region of South Asia, which includes parts of India and Pakistan. It consists of a long tunic or shirt, typically with long sleeves and a loose fit, paired with loose-fitting pants called salwar. The outfit is often accompanied by a scarf or stole, known as a dupatta, which is draped over the head or shoulders. The Punjabi Kameez is known for its vibrant colors, intricate embroidery, and rich fabrics, which vary depending on the occasion and the wearer's social status. It is a popular and versatile garment that can be worn for both casual and formal occasions, and has gained popularity worldwide due to its comfort and style.

==== Female dress: Punjabi salwar suit ====
The Punjabi salwar suit is worn in the Punjab in India and Pakistan. It consists of the chunni (head scarf), jhagga (kameez) and the salwar when worn by women. The chunni can be of varying lengths. The jhagga (kameez) is made up of two rectangular pieces sewn together with side slits, similar to a tunic. A kurta is also worn.

The salwar is similar to pajamas or pants, wide at the top and tightened loosely around the ankles with hard material, called paunchay. In the Punjab, the salwar kameez is also known as the chunni jhagga salwar suit.

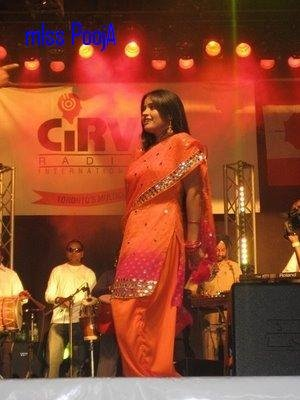
Punjabi suit

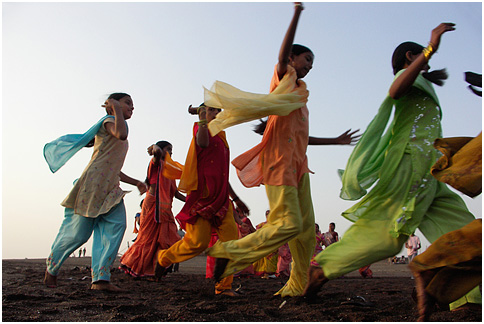
Girls in Punjabi suits

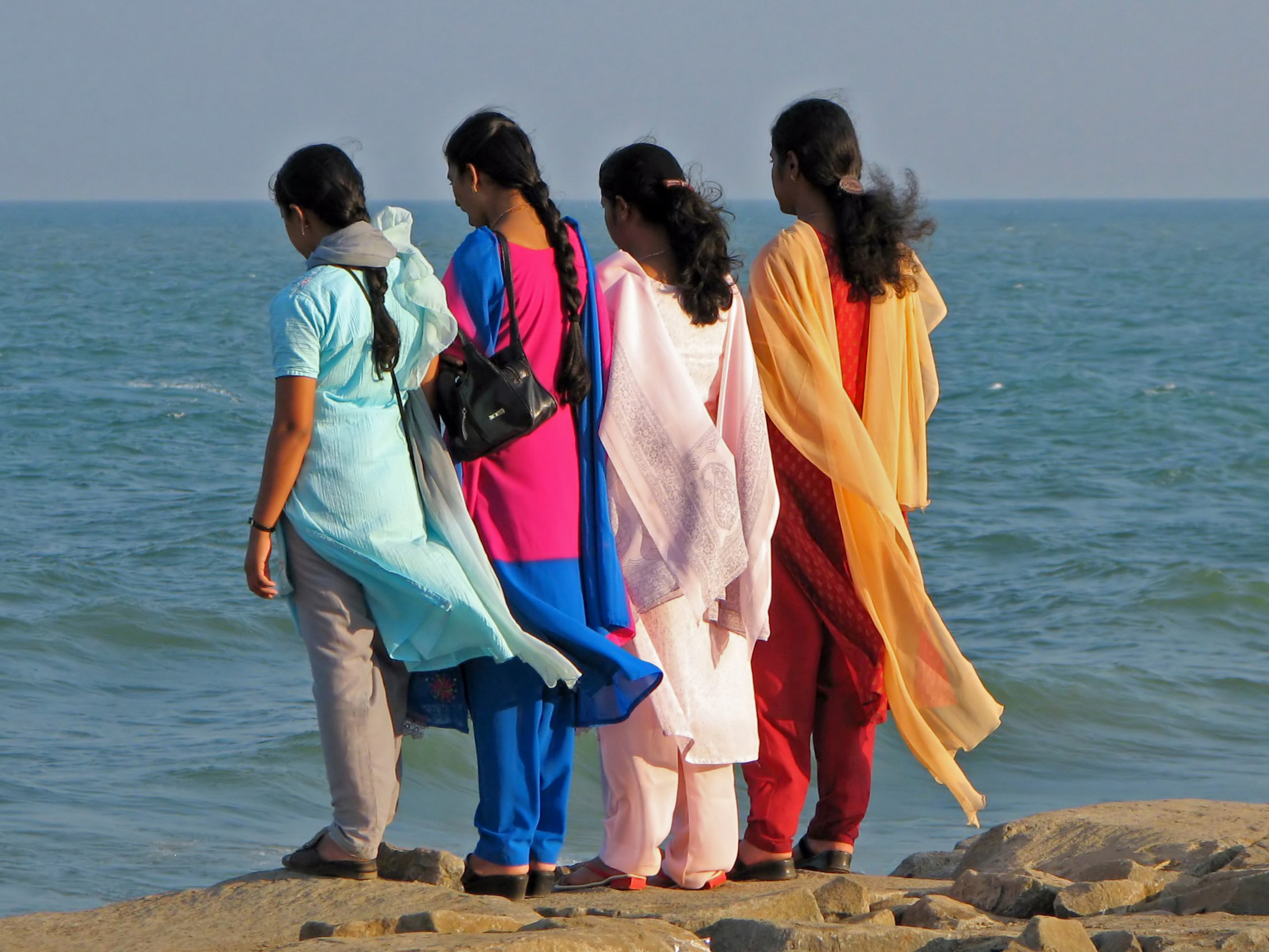
South Indian women in Punjabi suits

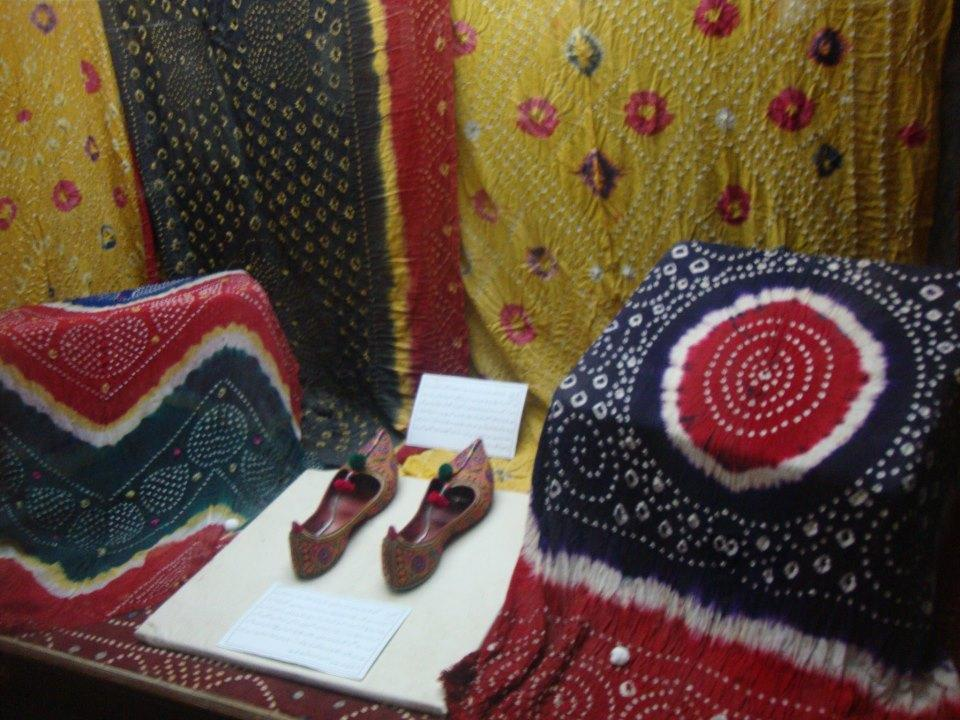
Rohi (Cholistan) woman's bandhani dress (Punjab, Pakistan)

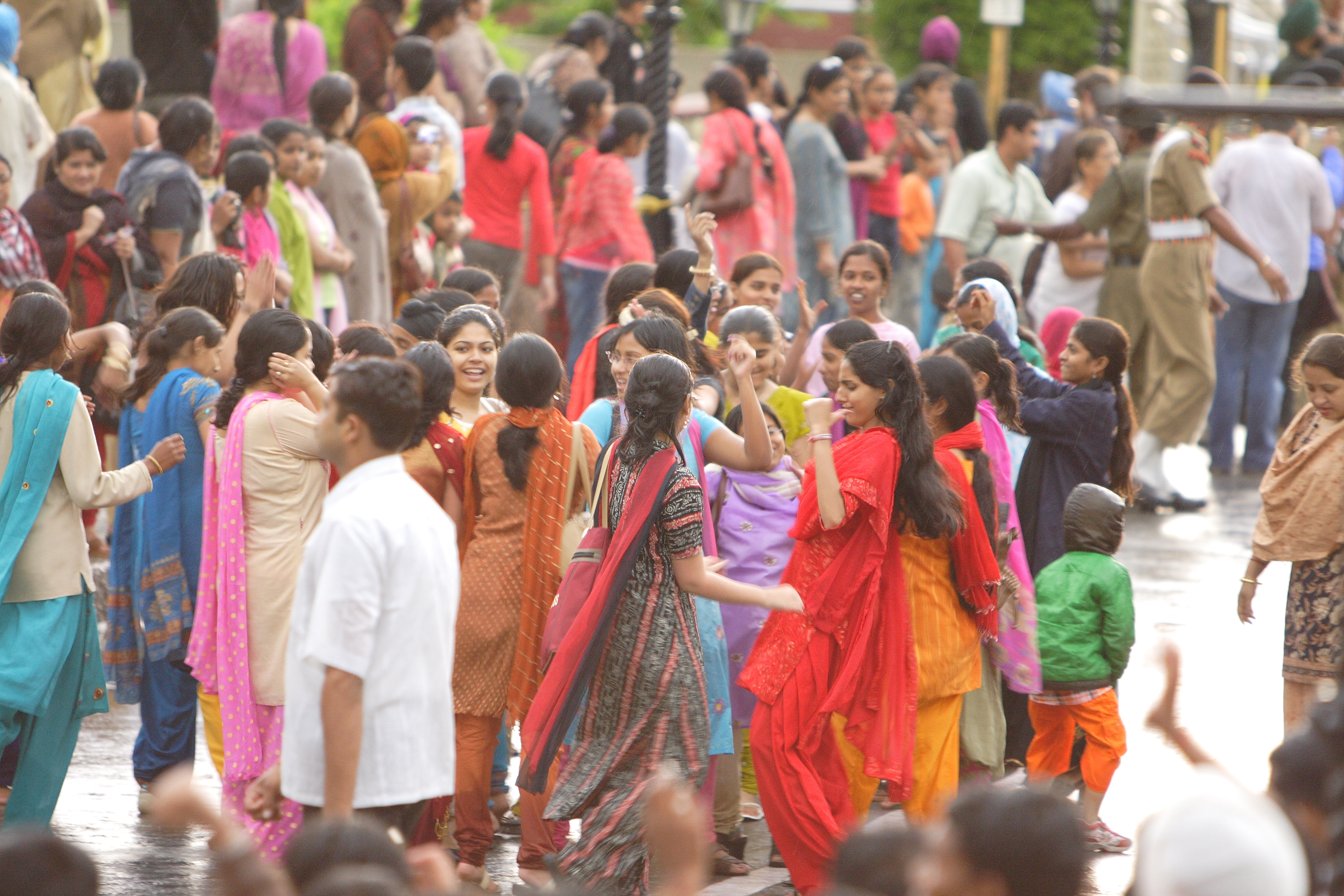
Dance, Attari-Wagah, women wearing Punjabi suits

==== Male dress: Punjabi salwar suit ====
In some parts of the Punjab region, especially the urban areas of Punjab, Pakistan, males wear the men's Punjabi suit. The upper garment is made of the straight cut kurta/kameez and the salwar resembles a slim fit pajama. In the past, the suthan was also commonly worn by men, a trend which can still be seen in some parts of the region (especially Jammu and Himachal Pradesh).

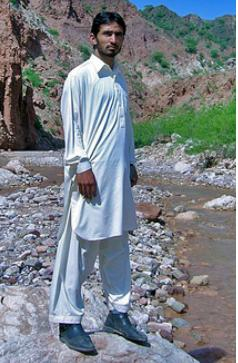
Men's Punjabi salwar suit

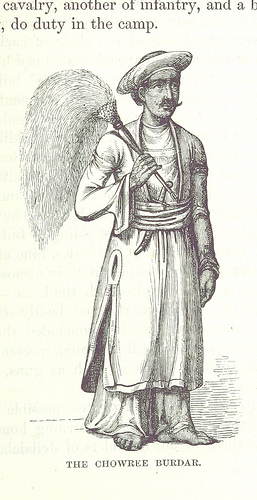
Punjabi kurta Ferozepur, 1845

=== Jhagga ===
The Ghaznavid Turks popularised the salwar/tunic attire in Afghanistan.

=== Kashmir region ===
The use of the suthan or the salwar has been adopted in other areas. People in Jammu have changed the traditional attire from the peshwaj (flowing to the ankles) to the kurta and Dogri suthan. The Phiran is worn in Kashmir traditionally flowed to the ankles, is now of varying lengths and is worn with a loose suthan. Kashyap Bandhu is regarded as the person responsible for spreading the use of the suthan with the phiran amongst the communities that resisted to adopt its use, eventually leading to the use of the salwar. However, the traditional Kashmiri suthan is loose, similar to the styles worn in Afghanistan with some wearing styles similar to the Dogri suthan. The Punjabi salwar suit has also become popular.

Elsewhere in India and Pakistan, Muslim communities have traditionally worn the style of salwar worn by the Mughals combining them with Mughal upper garments such as the jamma. However, the salwar is now worn by members of various communities in India and Pakistan.

=== Sindh ===
In Sindh, Shalwar Kameez or (Suthan ain Khamis) in Sindhi worn by men are of two types, one is worn usually in lower/south of Sindh which has wider ankles and does not get narrow at ankles this type of Shalwar is called (Kancha), other has narrow ankles worn mostly in upper/north of Sindh and is called (Suthan/Salwar), both has very less pleats, the Khamis is also made of different styles, traditionally Sindhi men used to wear either short or long Angrakho which is tied at either side or in middle, the shorter one was called Angelo, other style was called Kiriyo/Puthiyo, then the short Kurtas called (Pehrān/Pehriyān) were commonly worn, which used to be collarless like Angrakho and was tied at either side or in middle, and had half way slit opening in front unlike angrakhas which used to be completely slit in front. The Pehrān/Pehriyān were also used to be embroidered with Sindhi bhart and mirrorwork. Above Angelo and Pehrān men also wore (Koti, Sadri, Gidi). During British Raj, the colllars were introduced in Sindh, the Sindhi men started wearing Pehran with collars and buttons, also during that time the English long coats and jackets were introduced. The upper garment of Sindhi men was mostly short either till waist or till midway to thighs, except for some men, but today the modern Khamis reaches at least till knees, the modern Khamis can have (Gol daman) round cut at end corners or (Chokor Daman) square cut, this is now an everyday clothing of Sindhi men. The clothes are adorned with Ajrak and topi or Patko (Turbans), but usually on everyday life, a various colored floral or checkered piece of cloth on shoulder or as turban, also used as a handkerchief, and for the protection from the heat of sun.

Women in Sindh wear Salwar/Suthan which is almost similar to men, but back in time some women of lower Sindh used to wear a very baggy Salwars called "Chareno" but these are not normally worn now. Many Sindhi women also wore churidar pajamo (Sohri Suthan). Traditional Sindhi women Suthan and Pajamo are made of bright colors and rich fabrics like soosi, silk, satin, velvets and brocades which are heavily embroidered at ankles (Pācha). The Salwars are worn with the Cholo (kameez) or Ghagho (frock) which are also heavily intricately embroidered with Sindhi bhart and other embellishments called Gaj, Aggoti, Gichi, back in time the Salwars were sometimes used to be hidden under a wide Paro/Peshgeer (Skirt), specially when a woman went outside and over the head women wore a wide and long veils called Rawo/Gandhi/Pothi/Chuni/Salur.

=== Bangladesh ===
The traditional male dress in Bangladesh is the lungi and Panjabi. Men also wear a shirt called Kaabli. The traditional female dress is the sari but women also wear the Salwar Kameez.

=== Afghanistan ===
The salwar is a traditional garment in Afghanistan worn by men as the Khet partug outfit. The Khet is the tunic, similar to a robe and the partoog is the Afghanistan salwar, with multiple pleats. The male dress also includes the perahan tunban. The Pathani suit has become popular since the 1990s. The female Punjabi suit is also popular in Afghanistan which is called the Panjabi.

== Punjabi suthan and kurta suit ==
The outfit predates the salwar suit but is complementary to it.

=== Etymology ===
The word suthan is derived from the Sanskrit word svasthana, which means tight fitting trousers. This, in turn, derives from the Central Asian word samstamni. The suthan are trousers cut straight and tight, as opposed to the salwar, which is baggy and can be full of folds. The tight suthan is loose to the knees, but the loose Punjabi suthan is loose to the lower legs and very tight at the ankles. The salwar ends in a band which is loose fitting. Despite this difference, people use the words suthan and salwar interchangeably to refer to loose suthans and salwars, with the loose suthan resembling the salwar.

Prior to the use of the term pajama, the term suthan was used. Therefore, the woollen pajamas of Gilgit are also referred to as suthan. However, these are not of the Punjabi variety. The churidar pajama was also referred to as suthan.

The word suthana was also used in Hindi, to refer to pajamas.

=== History ===
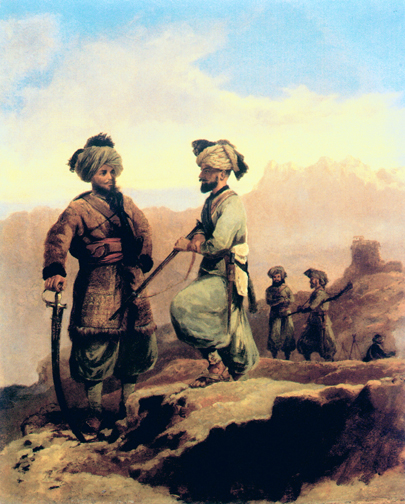
20th (Punjab) Regiment of Bengal Native Infantry. Painting by Walter Fane (1828–85), 1868

==== Suthan ====
The use of the suthan in the Punjab region also called suthana in Punjabi is a survival of the ancient svasthana. Svasthana referred to a lower garment which can be described as a type of trousers. The svasthana was in use amongst the rulers in the Mauryan times (322–185 BCE). Evidence of the use of svasthana amongst the ruling classes has also been observed in North India during the Kushan Empire between the 1st and 3rd centuries C.E. It was noted in use during the Gupta Empire between 4th and 6th centuries C.E. and during King Harsha's rule during the 7th century C.E.

A version of the svasthana has been noted in ancient India which sticks to the calves with narrow circumferences of the lower opening. This is similar to the Punjabi ghuttana which is loose at the thighs and tightens at the knees and ends at the calves (with some versions ending at the knees and the lower legs being naked). This suggests that the use of the suthan is indigenous to the Punjab region. Ultimately, however, the svasthana could have been introduced to ancient India from Central Asia, but its use became popular amongst the general people in the local area during the medieval period, particularly, the 7th century C.E. The wearing of the suthan and kurta continued to be prevalent during the Mughal period between 1526 and 1748 C.E. and has been in use in unbroken succession since ancient times. The National Review (1925) notes that the suthan was in much use in the Punjab, generally in white washable cloth but on feast days of rich material such as Lahore silk. The svasthana was worn with the tunic called varbana which was tight fitting.

==== Kurta/kurti ====
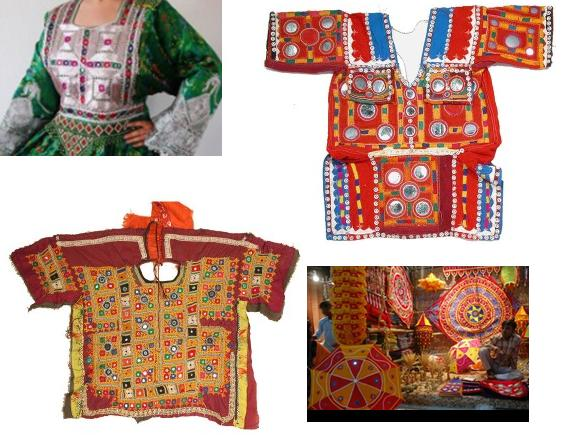
Saraiki kurti

The use of side slits in the straight cut Punjabi kurta can be traced to the 11th century C.E. Female kurtaka worn in parts of north India was a short shirt, with sleeves extending from the shoulders, to the middle of the body, and had slashes on the left and the right sides. This is the same as the modern straight cut kurta which has side slits and worn by women in Punjab.

In modern usage, a short kurta is referred to as the kurti. However, traditionally, the kurti is a short cotton coat (without side slits) and is believed to have descended from the tunic of the Shunga period (2nd century BC). The local style of kurti also includes the type that flares out around the waist.

The traditional Punjabi kurti is front opening and is buttoned. Traditionally, a chain of gold or silver called zanjiri is woven into the buttons. The use of the kurti by women has been noted during the 1600s to the present day. The kurti can be front opening from below the neck to the waist, or cover the back but leave the stomach exposed with some styles fastening at the back. A variation of the kurti, known as a bandi, is sleeveless and is worn as a pullover with no side slits and front opening. A longer version of the bandi is known as a chemise which has a lace around its hem. Both bandi and chemise traditionally have been worn by women indoors. Somer versions are worn as pullovers with no side slits and font opening. The choli is referred to as kurti in Punjabi which can be half or full sleeved and be hip length.

=== Design ===
Punjabi women in west Punjab and east Punjab (which includes Haryana and Himachal Pradesh) traditionally wore the Punjabi suthan suit which was made of a head scarf, upper garment and suthan.

==== Types ====
The Punjabi suthan is of two types: loose to above the ankles and tight at the ankles, or loose to the knees, and then cut straight and tight to the ankles.

==== Loose Punjabi suthan ====
It was noted by Alberuni in the 11th century C.E. that the local drawers are of gigantic proportions. This could point to the loose Punjabi suthan which, unlike the Punjabi salwar, has multiple pleats and is very baggy with many folds. The suthan can also be arranged in plaits. Up to 20 yards of cloth can be used which hangs in innumerable folds. Some varieties, such as those of Chakwal, can use between 30 and 40 yards of cloth which are made with overhanging pleats.

The material used for the suthan is traditionally coloured cotton with silk lines going down and is called sussi. Sussi was manufactured in various places such as Hoshiarpur, Amritsar, Multan and Jhang.

Instead of the Punjabi salwar paunchay at the bottom of the salwar, which are loose, the Punjabi suthan is gathered midway between the knees and the ankles to fit closely to the leg and end in a tight band at the ankles which is what distinguishes the two lower garments. The tight band of the suthan is a remnant of the ancient svasthana trousers which were tight fitting to the thighs. The use of loose material is a local development. The pleats of the suthan either gather in circles resembling bangles, or fall vertically to the ankles. As the distinction between the loose Punjabi suthan and the baggy salwar rests on the ankle band, some view the loose Punjabi suthan as another version of the salwar, with the definition of suthan being reserved for the tight Punjabi suthan. The loose suthan is primarily a female costume, but in some areas, such as Rawalpindi, was worn by men too, which is also called tambi when worn by men. The loose suthan was also worn by men in Bannu (Khyber Pakhtunkhwa) which has historical and cultural connections with the rest of the Punjab region.

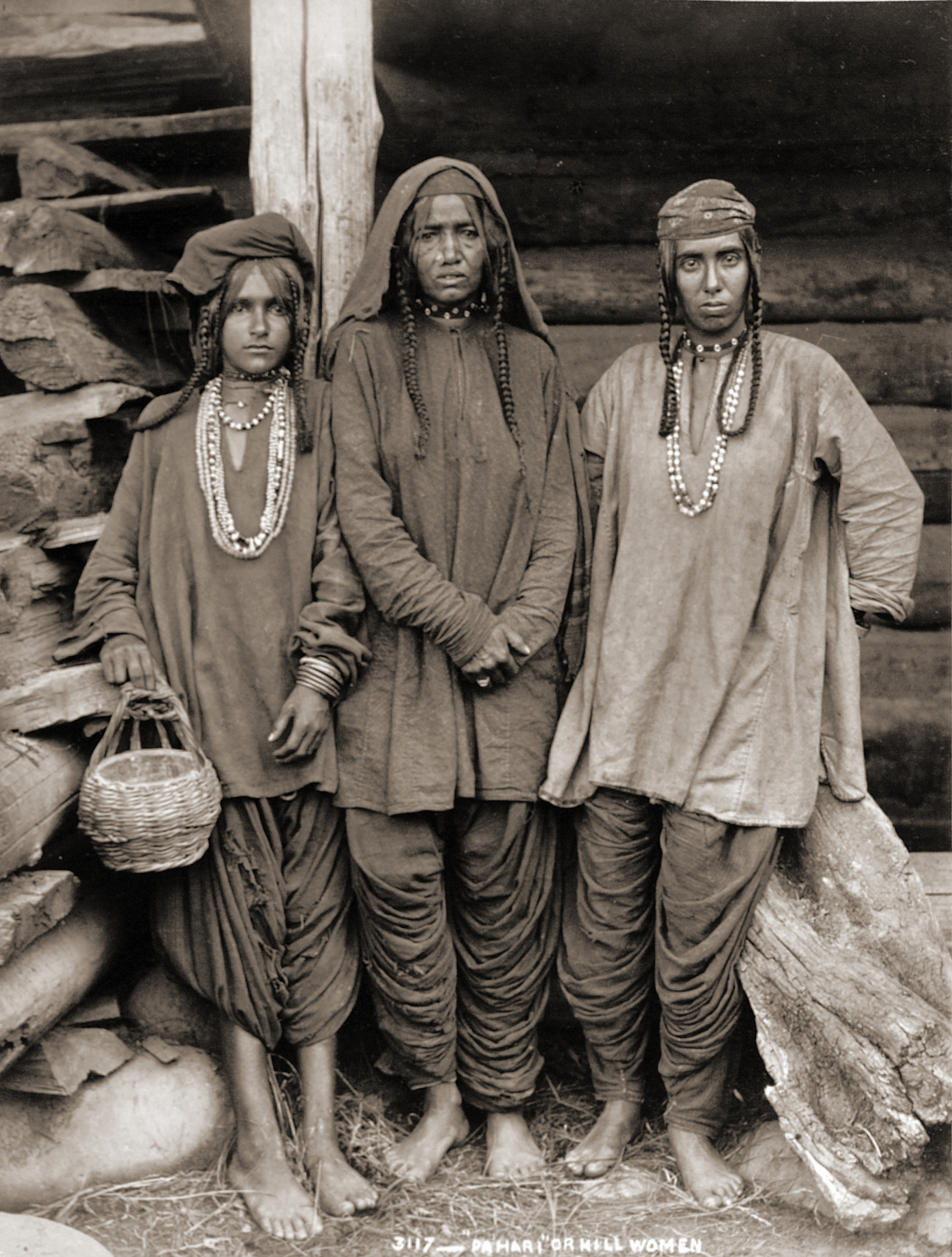
Women in Punjabi suthan, 1890

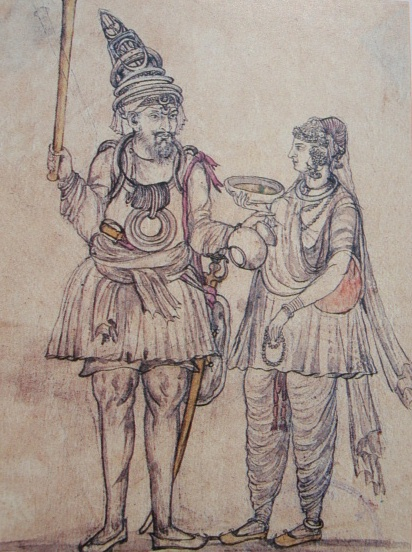
19th century Punjabi suthan suit worn by the lady on the right

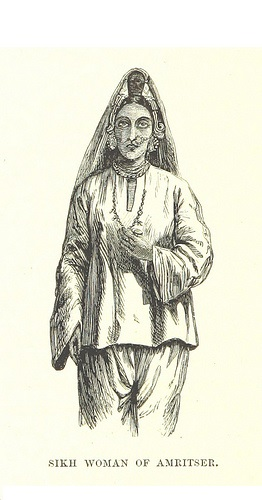
Punjabi woman in Punjabi suthan and short kurta, 1874

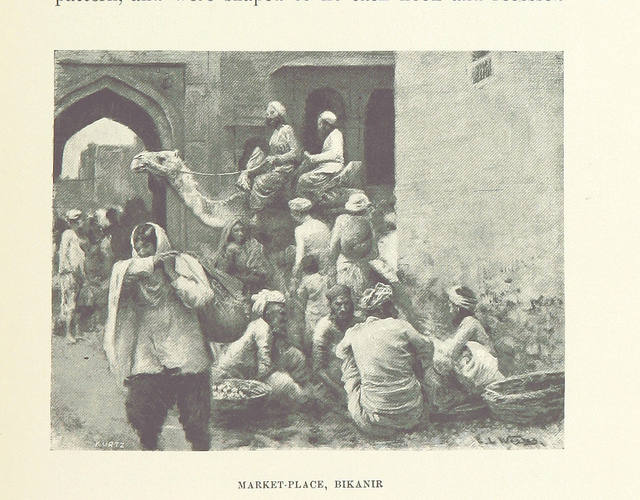
Woman on left in loose Punjabi suthan suit

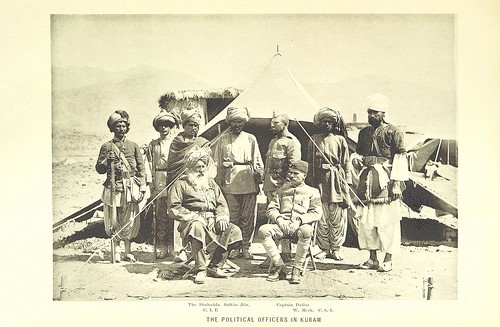
Men in British Punjab army in tight and loose Punjabi suthans, 1895

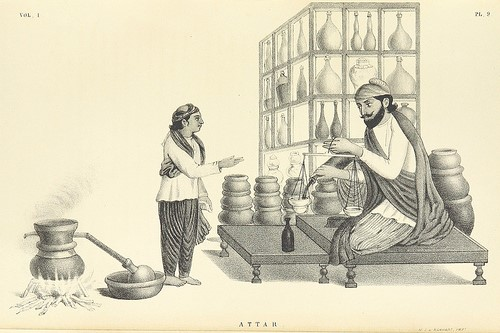
A Punjabi woman in kurti and suthan visiting the Attar, the pharmacist, 1852

==== Tight Punjabi suthan ====
The tight Punjabi suthan is a variation of the ancient svasthana, and was still popular in the Punjab region in the 19th century. The tight suthan is baggy from the knees up and tight from the knees down to the ankles (a remnant of the tight fit ancient svasthana). The tight suthan remained popular in the East Punjab into the 1960s. In Multan, the tight suthan remained popular till the early 21st century. The Punjabi suthan is part of male and female attire and is part of traditional dress in the hills of Punjab, Pakistan, including Bannu. It is still a traditional garment in Jammu where it is held in high regard. The Gaddi community wear the garment, especially in Pathankot and Nurpur (Gurdaspur District).Its variation known as the churidar suthan is worn in the Punjab mountainous region especially by the Gujjar community in the foothills of Punjab, India, and Himachal Pradesh whereby the upper part is loose but below the knees, the tight part is sewn in folds to create a bangles look. When worn in Jammu, the suthan is referred to as Dogri pants or Dogri suthan. This is the basis of the churidar pyjama, which in the Punjab region is also known as the (full length) ghuttana which was adopted in Lucknow during the 19th century. Where the churidar suthan is tight up to the knees and wide above, the churidar pajama is tight below the calves and slightly loose above. The waist fits closer than the suthan.

In the late 19th century, the slim line riding breeches known as Jodhpuri, were developed along the lines of the tight fitting Punjabi suthan, albeit the churidar is cited as an inspiration. Since the creation of India and Pakistan, women of the meo community of Rajasthan have adopted the salwar called khusni which, like the Punjabi suthan, is tight below the knees and loose above and is worn with a long kameez.

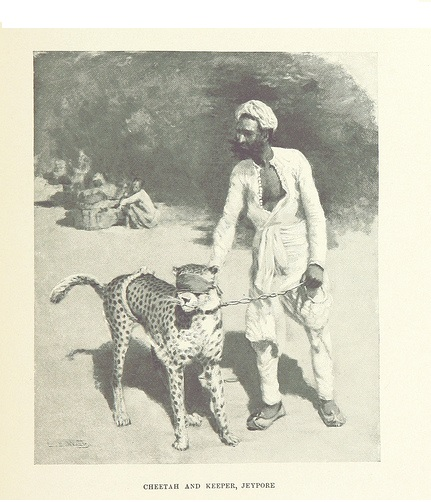
Man in tight Punjabi suthan. 1896

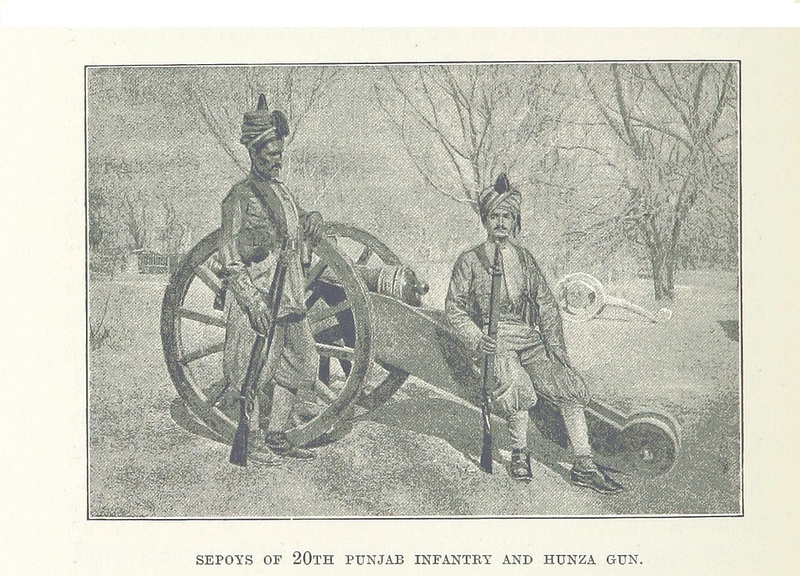
1893. Men in Punjabi tight from knees suthan

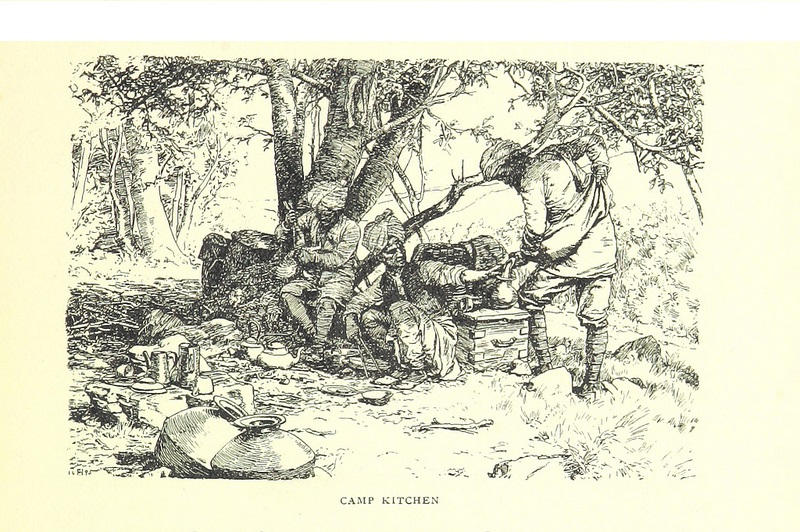
Men of the British Punjab army in Punjabi churidar suthans 1895 Punjab Hills

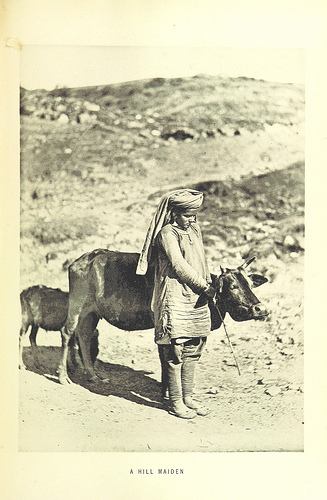
Punjab Hills 1895. Kulu woman in Punjabi churidar suthan. Himachal Pradesh.

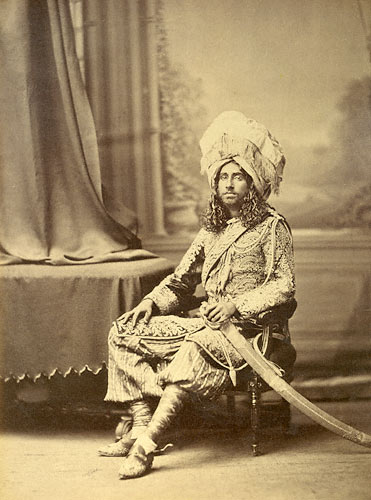
he Nawab Muhammad Bahawal Khan Abbasi V Bahadur (1883–1907) of Bahawalpur State in suthan

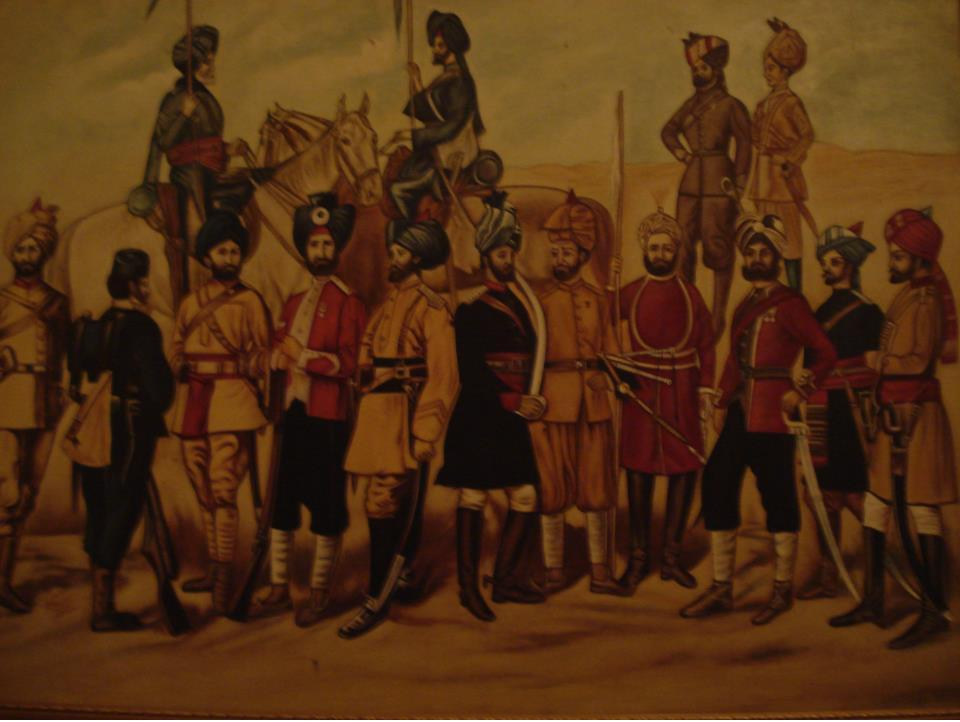
Nawab of Bahawalpur and generals in suthan

===== Upper garments =====
Punjabi women wore the suthan with a kurta, kurti, kameez or jhaga. The kurti could be straight cut ending at the waist or be a mini version of the anga, which is a gown flowing to below the knees and even to the ankles (akin to the anarkali) also known as an angarkha and peshwaj which is similar to a loose coat and wadded with cotton.

===== Variations =====
Sometimes women replaced the suthan with a churidar pajama, (a tradition noted by Baden-Powell in 1872 in his book Hand-book of the Manufactures and Arts of the Punjab) which would then be covered with a Punjabi Ghagra when going outdoors. The Punjabi ghagra has its origins in the candataka which continued as a popular female dress in the seventh century. The use of the svasthana was also popular in this period. However, the candataka ended at the thighs and the svasthana may have been used to cover the lower legs thus giving rise to the tradition of wearing the ghagra and the suthan together. Older Punjabi women wore churidar pajama and long kurta. These different styles were popular during the 1960s in East Punjab. Certain members of the Punjabi community however, were wearing the suthan and kurti on its own without the Punjabi Ghagra, a tradition documented in the Gazetter of Hoshiarpur District 1883-84 and also in the 1915 Hissar Gazetteer Punjabi women (and men) also wore the ghutanna, a type of pajama which was shorter than the full length pajama, and was tight and ended at the calf.

Although the use of the Suthan subsequently spread to the Jammu area of the Punjab region, Sindh (where it was not traditionally worn) and Kashmir, in the plains of the Punjab region, the suthan was replaced with the Punjabi version of the salwar and the Punjabi kameez which gained more and more popularity during the 1960s.

== See also ==
- Patiala salwar
- Punjabi clothing
- Saraiki shalwar suits
- Shalwar kameez
