= Luanchari =

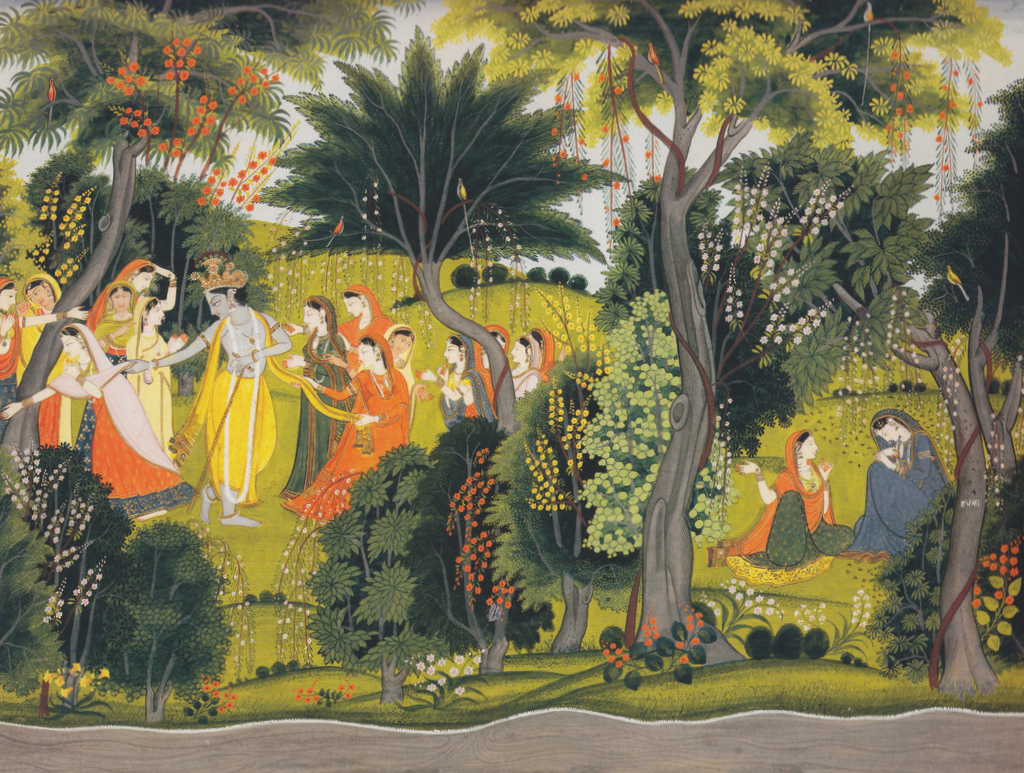
Pahari painting depicting women in Luanchari. ca.1760

The luanchari (Hindi: लोआंचरी) is a full-dress ethnic garment of India. It is made up of two parts stitched together: the upper part, or choli, is a kind of blouse or bodice, and the lower part, or lehanga, is a long skirt. The two parts are typically made from the same fabric, but may vary in colour.

The luanchari is commonly worn by women in Pahari miniatures, and is quite similar to lehanga. It takes well over 16 to 21 yards of fabric to make a complete luanchari. They are traditionally worn by the Gaddi women (Gaddnis or Gaddans) of Himachal Pradesh.

== See also ==
- Gagra choli
- Langa Voni
