= Gota patti =

Type of metallic ribbon embroidery from Rajasthan, India

Gota patti or gota work is a type of embroidery originating in Rajasthan, India. It uses the applique technique, and patterns are created by sewing pieces of zari ribbon onto fabric. Gota embroidery is used extensively in South Asian wedding and formal clothes.

== Overview ==
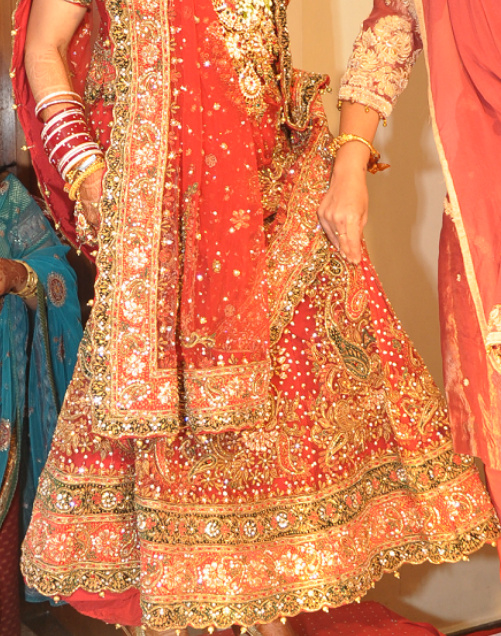
Bridal gagra with gota patti embroidery

Gota is a gold or silver ribbon and lace from Lucknow. Various other coloured ribbons of varying width, woven in a satin or twill weave may also be referred to as gota. It is used along with kinari work. The dresses with gota work are used for special occasions or religious occasions. Gota is crafted using an appliqué technique with a strip of gold or silver or various other coloured ribbons of different widths woven in a satin or twill weave. It involves placing woven gold cloth onto fabrics such as georgette or bandhani to create different surface textures.

Originally real gold and silver metals were used to embroider, but these were eventually replaced by copper coated with silver as the genuine way of making it was very expensive. Nowadays there are even more inexpensive options available. The copper has been replaced by polyester film which is further metalized and coated to suit requirements. This is known as plastic gota and is highly durable as it has a good resistance to moisture and does not tarnish as opposed to metal based gota.

The process is lengthy and time-consuming. The first step is to trace the design on the fabric. This is done by placing a tracing paper with the design on it on the fabric and spreading a paste of chalk powder over it. Depending on the design, the gota is cut and folded into various shapes. It is then appliquéd by hemming or back-stitching it on the fabric.

Attractive patterns are specific to the region, and each motif has its own distinguishing name. The motifs are usually inspired by nature and may consist of flowers, leaves and birds or animals such as peacocks, parrots and elephants.

Gota creates a rich and heavy look but is light to wear.

In Rajasthan, outfits with gota work are worn at auspicious functions. It is generally done on dupattas, turban edges and ghagras.
