= Poshak =

Vedic term used for costumes

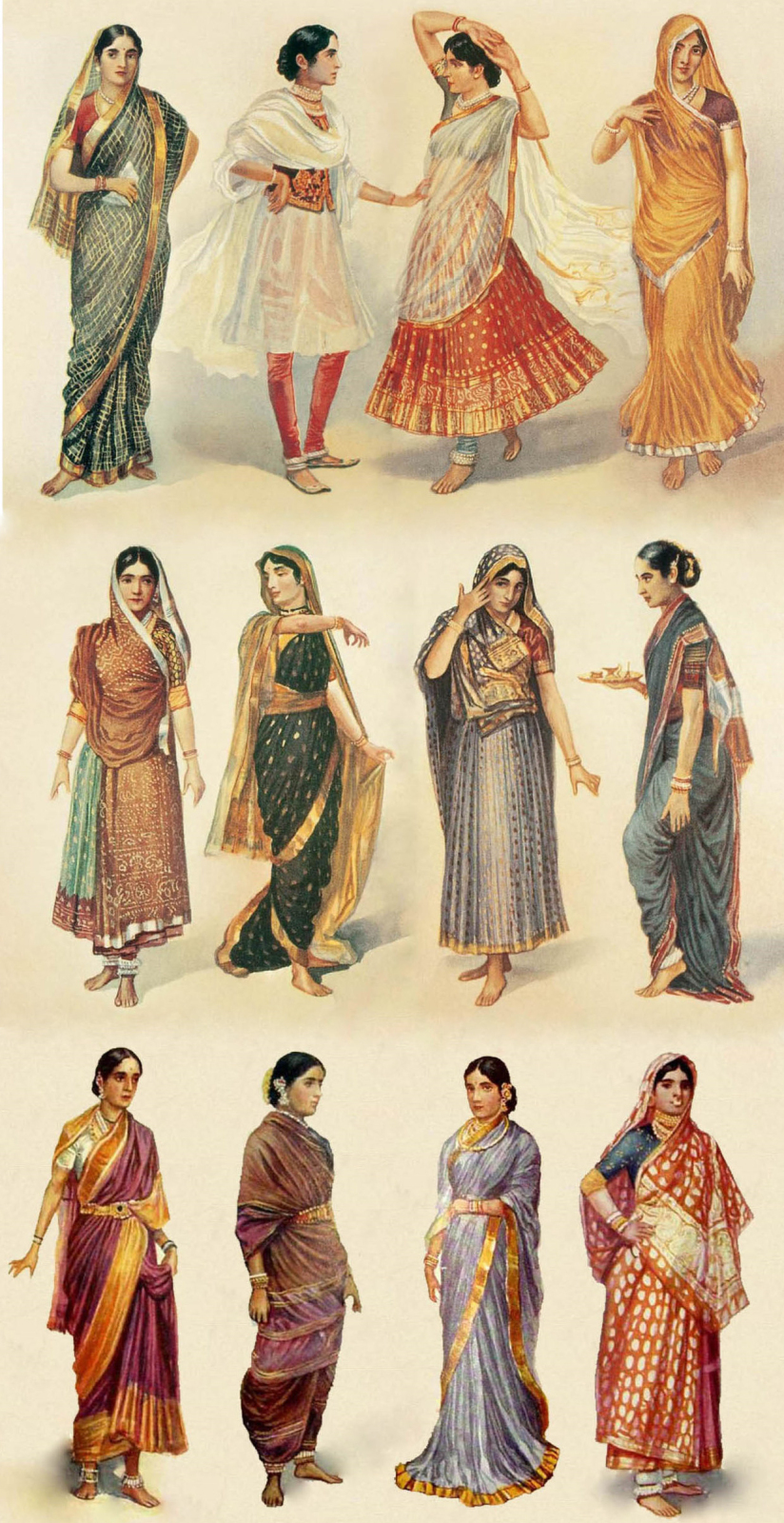
1928 Illustration of different styles of sari, gagra choli & shalwar kameez worn by women in the Indian subcontinent.

Poshak (पोशाक), also called Vāstra (वस्त्र) is the Hindi term used for the complete attire used in the vedic period. As mentioned in Sanskrit literature and Buddhist Pali literature during the 6th century BC, the costumes belonging to the Vedic and post-Vedic period 1500 BCE to 350 BCE consisted of the antariya, which is the lower garment, the uttariya, which is a veil worn over the shoulder or the head, and the stanapatta, which is a chest band. The modernday Sari is one of the evolved poshak earlier known as Sattika (which means women's attire) that was single garment to wrap around the waist and cover the head.

== Meaning ==
Poshak means a specific type of costume in English. Vasna or Vastar (means dress) has two main categories vasa for lower, and Adhivasa for upper body parts, other related terms of garb used in Vedas are as following.

- Suvasa was the term for a splendid garment
- Suvasna for well clad
- Surabhi for well fitting clothes.

== Types and styles ==
पोशाक,परिधान Poshak, pridhaan was a set of clothes for men and women. These clothes were common and unsewn but varied with the size and style of wrapping and draping. They have various descriptions of associated ensembles in Vedas, such as for the characters in the Ramayana and the Mahabharata. Sari, is significantly stated in the Hindu epic Mahabharata, the war took place in 3067 BCE.

=== Forms ===
- Uttariya is an "upper body garment".
- Adivasah is a loose-fitting outer garment, it is a type of over garment similar to a mantle or cloak
- Antariya is a lower body garment.
- Stanapatta is a chest band to cover the breasts.
- Sari

=== Bhesha ===
Suna Besha is an event at the Jagannath Temple, Puri, where the Hindu deities Shri Jagannath ji, Balabhadra, and Subhadra are adorned with poshak variety of jewelry. The rituals are similar in many other Hindu temples where the devotees offer Poshak to the deities as a part of their prayers.

=== Different costumes of Vedic culture ===
Following sculptures in the Indian subcontinent, terracottas, cave paintings, and wood carvings conferring men and women wore the same (unstitched) clothes with various wrapping and draping styles.

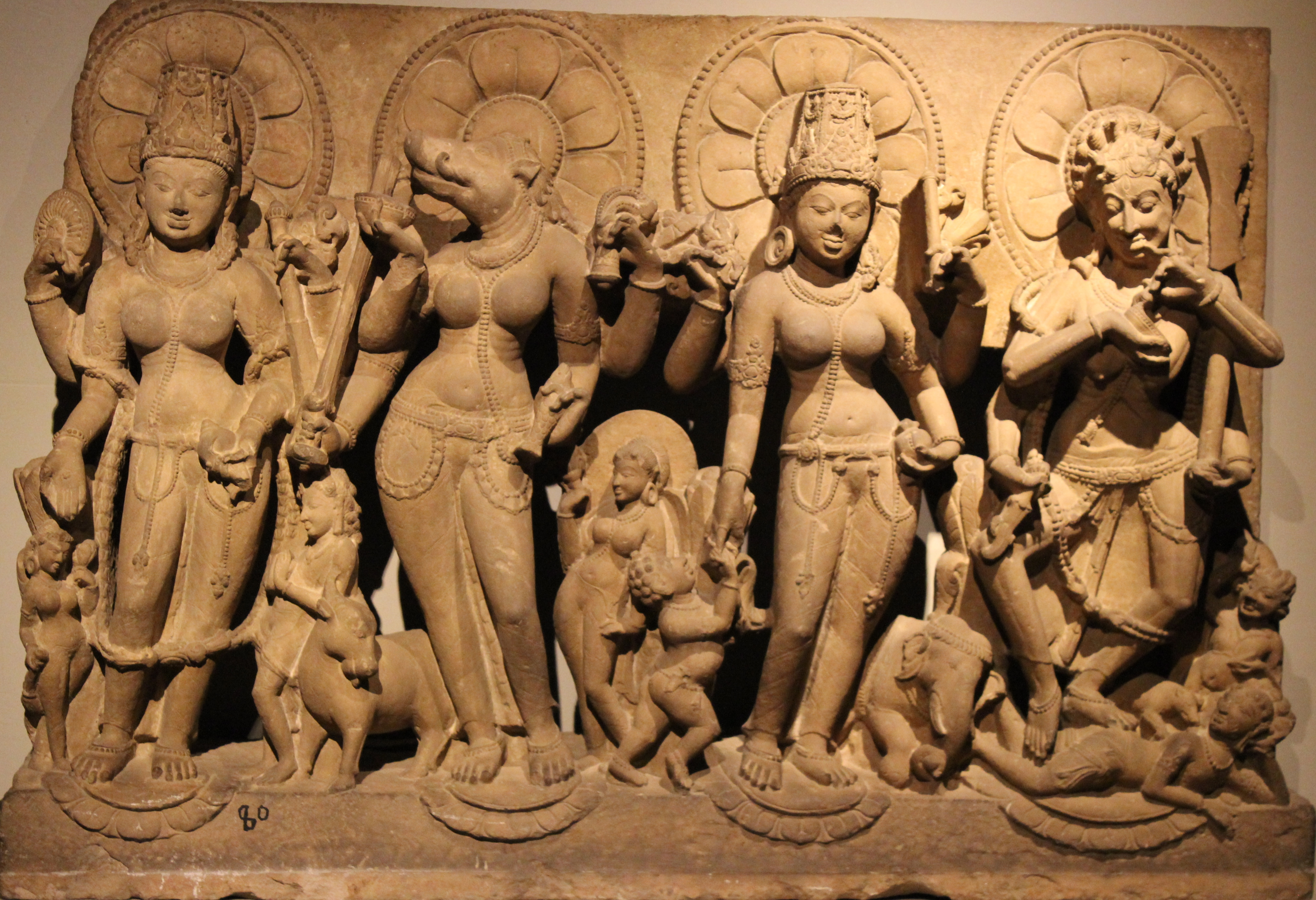
Shaktism is a Goddess-centric tradition of Hinduism. Relief statues of Vaishnavi, Varahi, Indrani and Chamunda

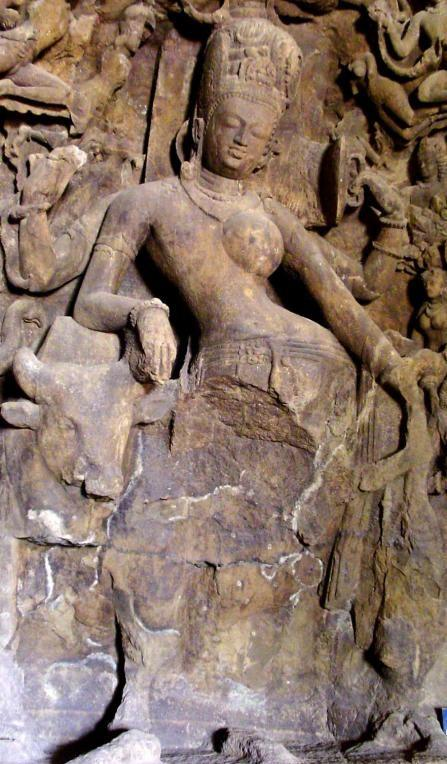
In Shakta theology, the female and male are interdependent realities, represented with Ardhanarishvara icon. Left: A 5th century art work representing this idea at the Elephanta Caves; Right: a painting of Ardhanarishvara.

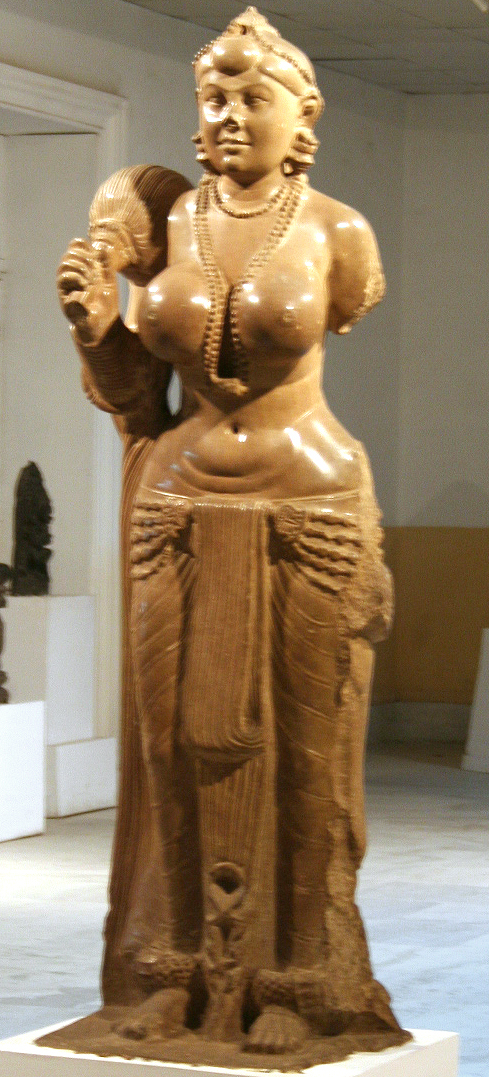
Yakshini wearing dhoti wrap and elaborate necklace, Mauryan period.

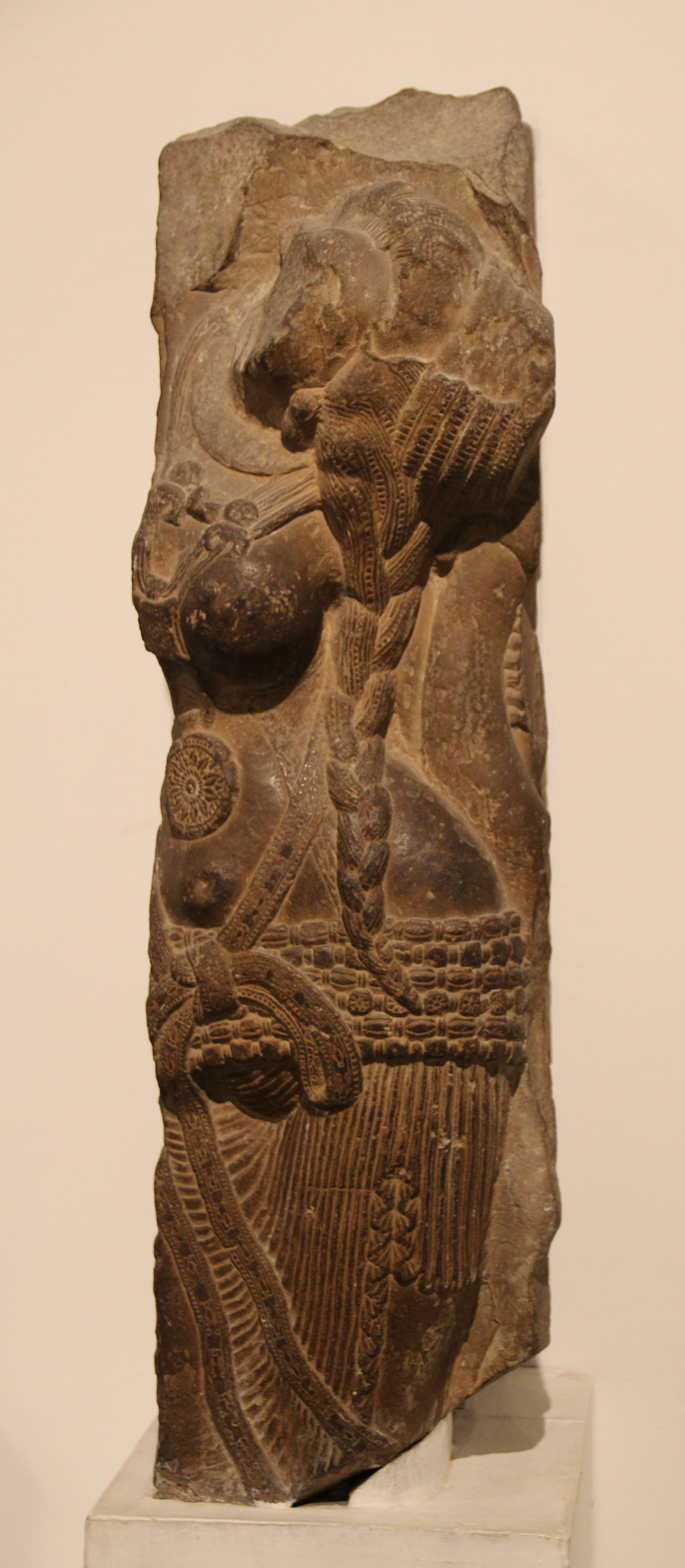
The "Mehrauli Yakshi", dated to 150 BCE, Mathura.

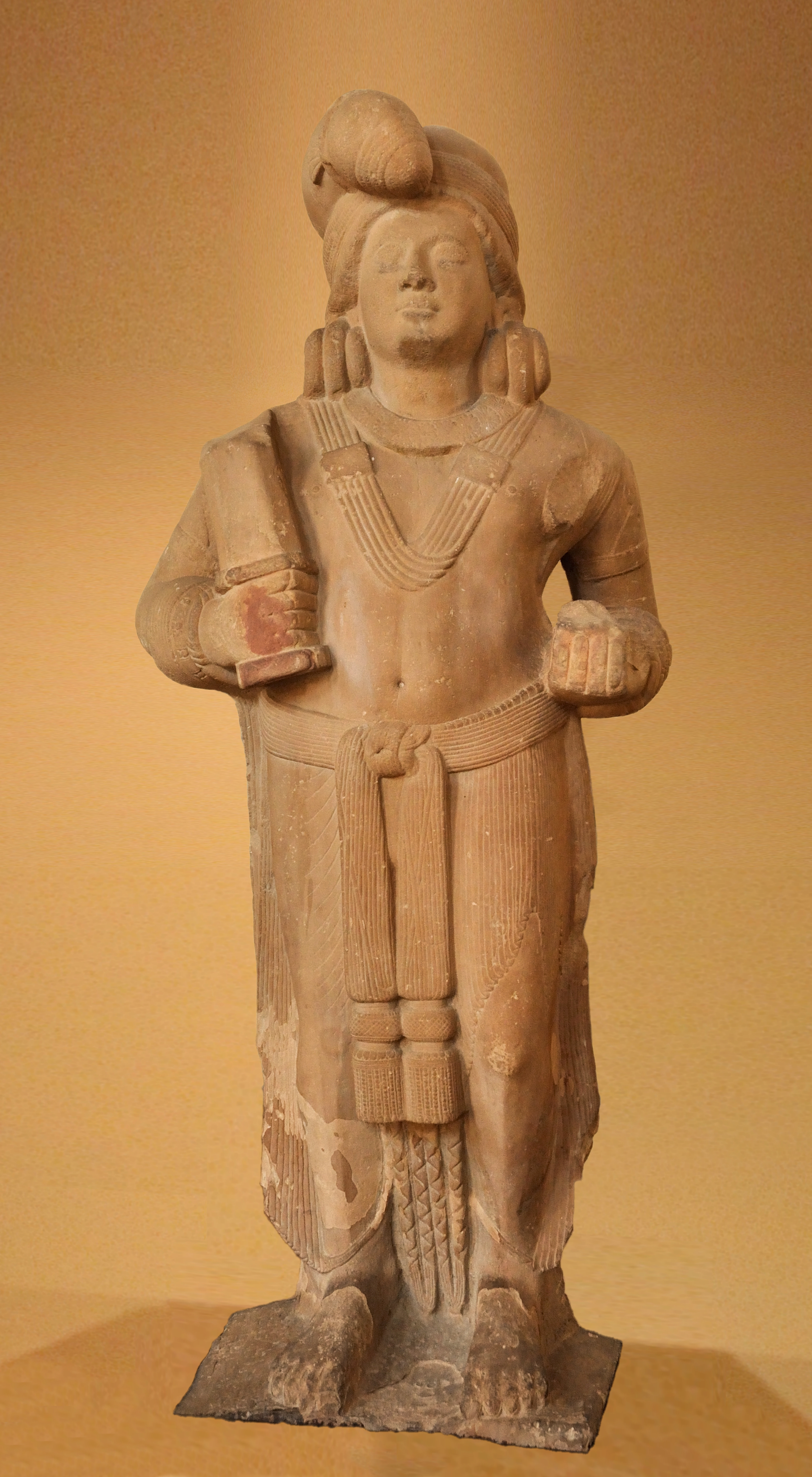
Mudgarpani Yaksha, 100 BCE.

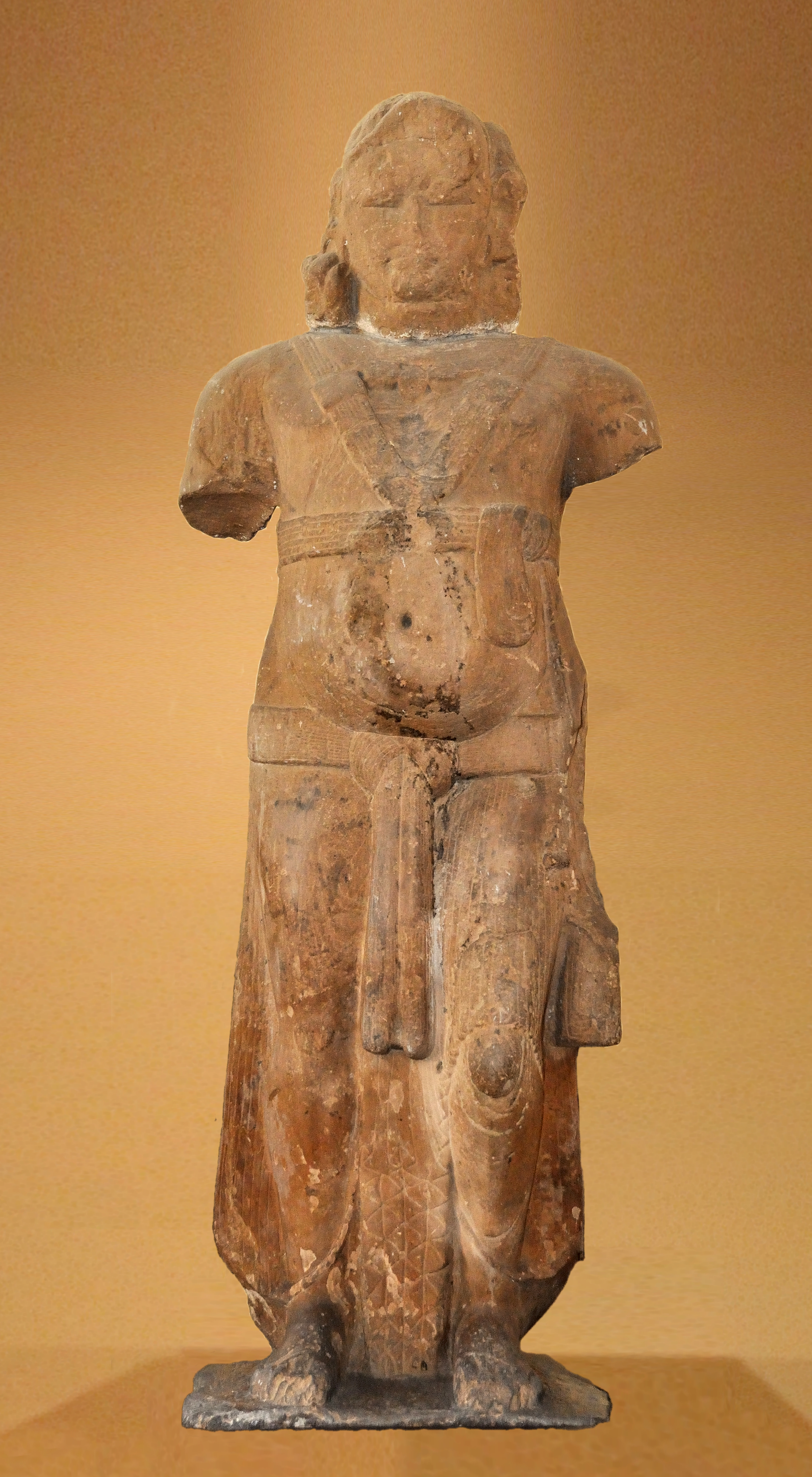
Parkham Yaksha, 150 BCE.

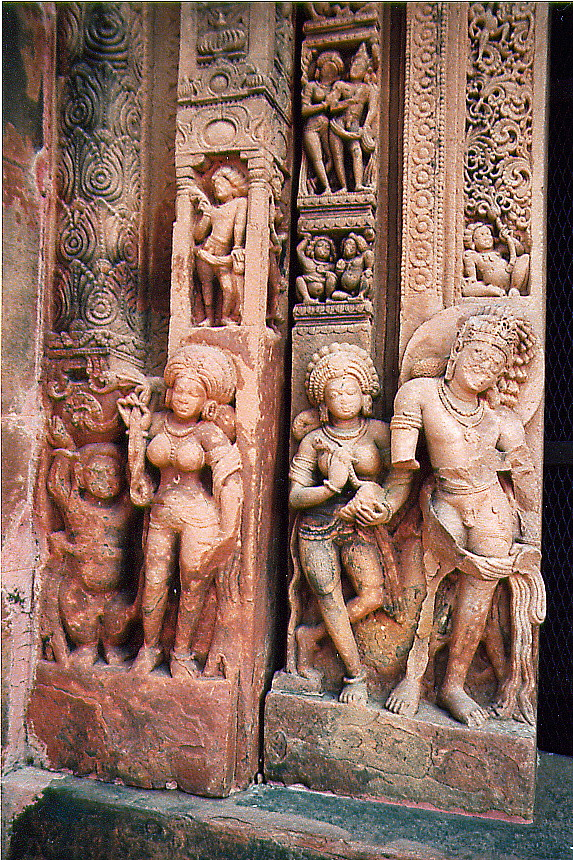
Females statues wearing drapes are depicted at Dashavatara Temple.

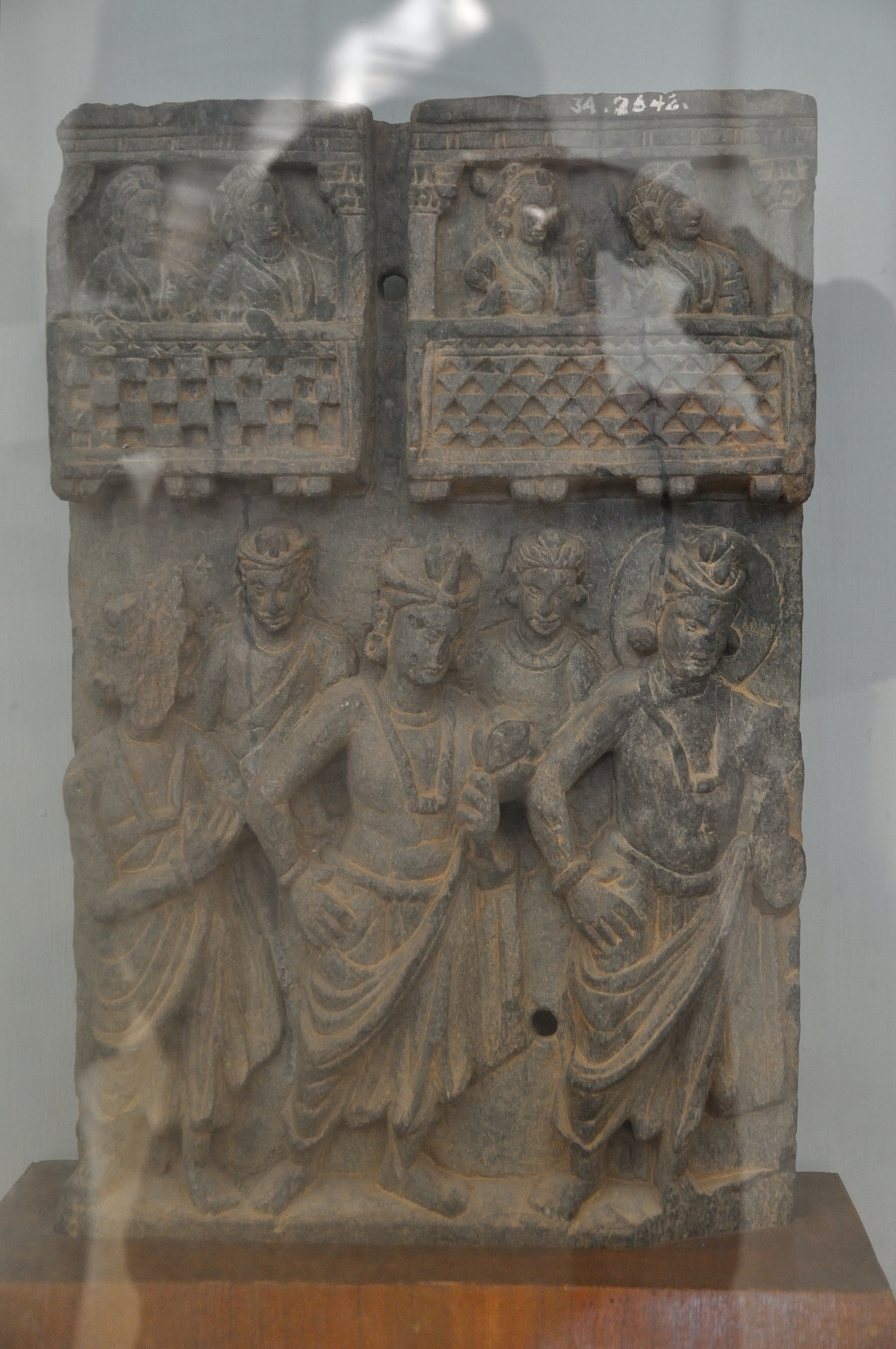
Relief depicting men in antriya and uttariya, 1st century CE.

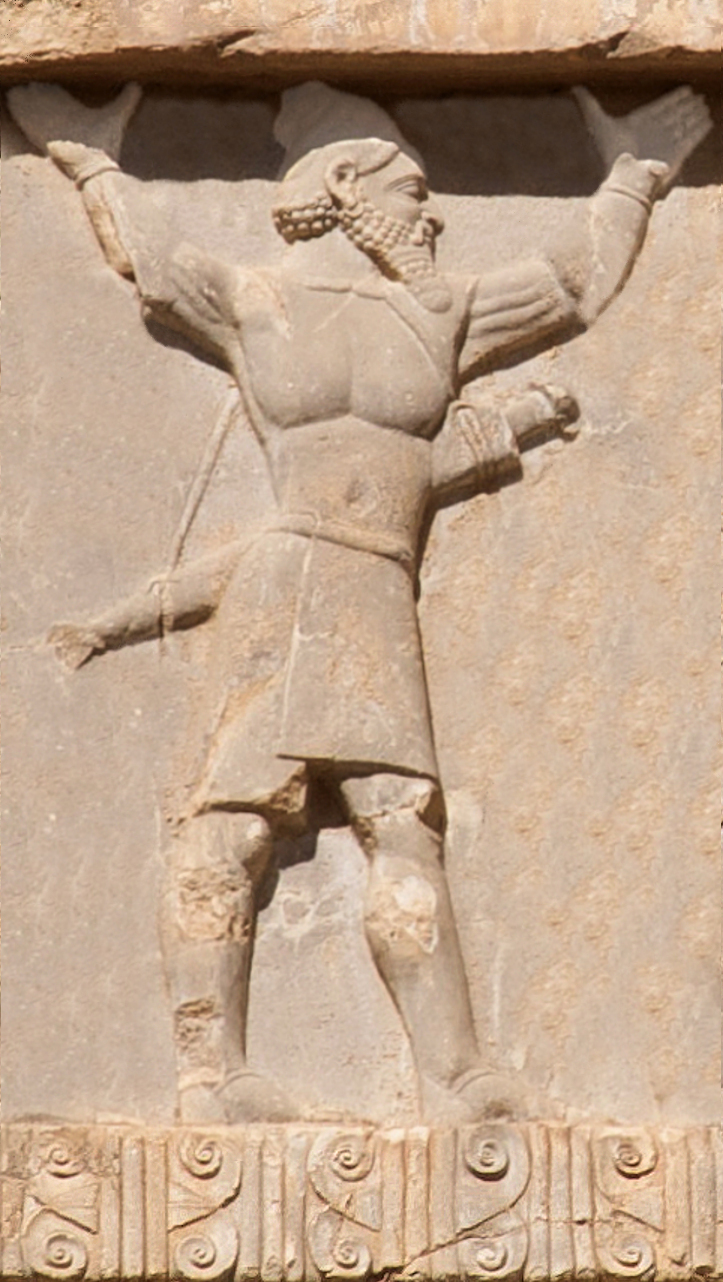
Hindush soldier, circa 480 BCE. He wears a Dhoti and a turban. Tomb of Xerxes I.

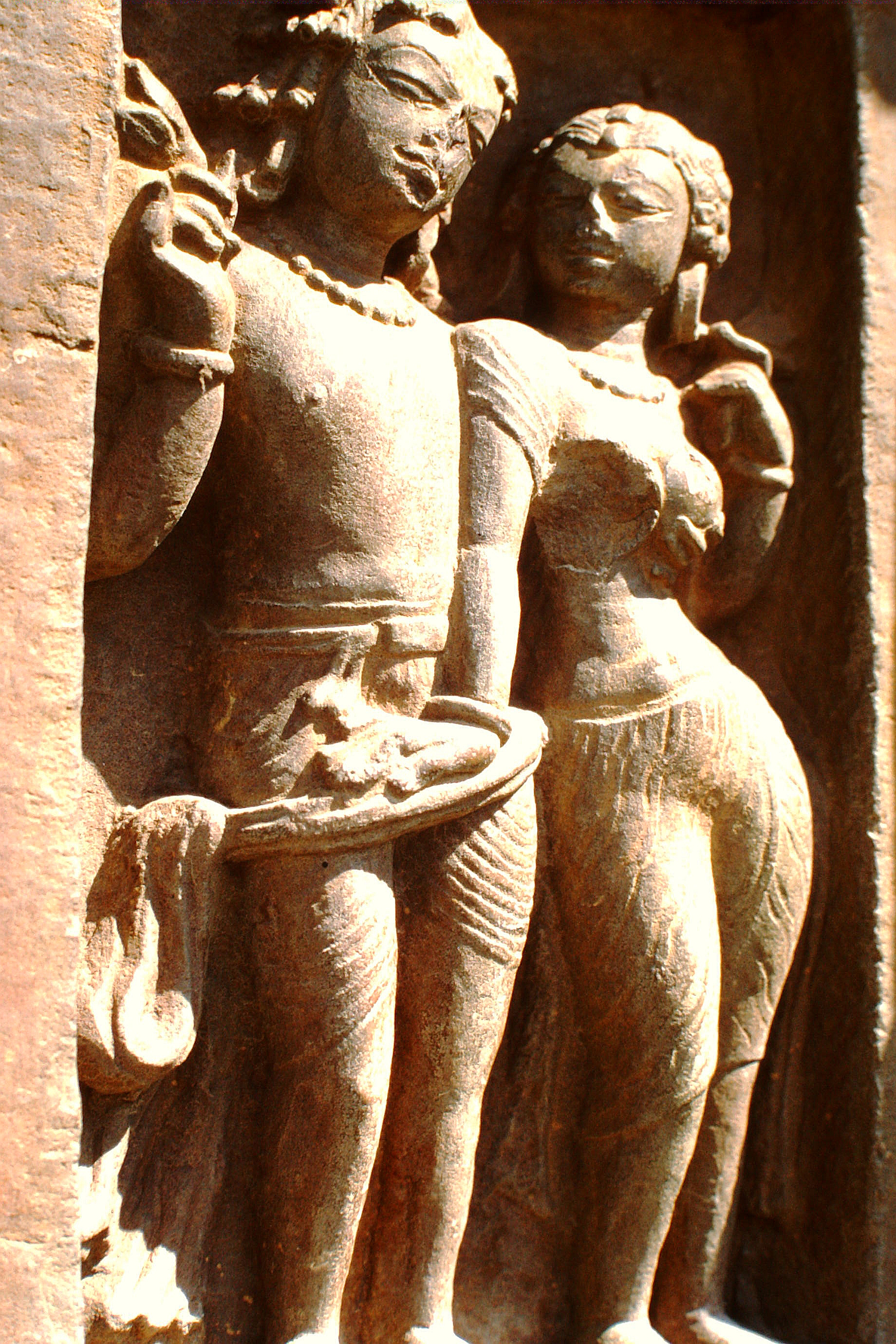
Male and female statues wearing drapes at Nachna Hindu temples.

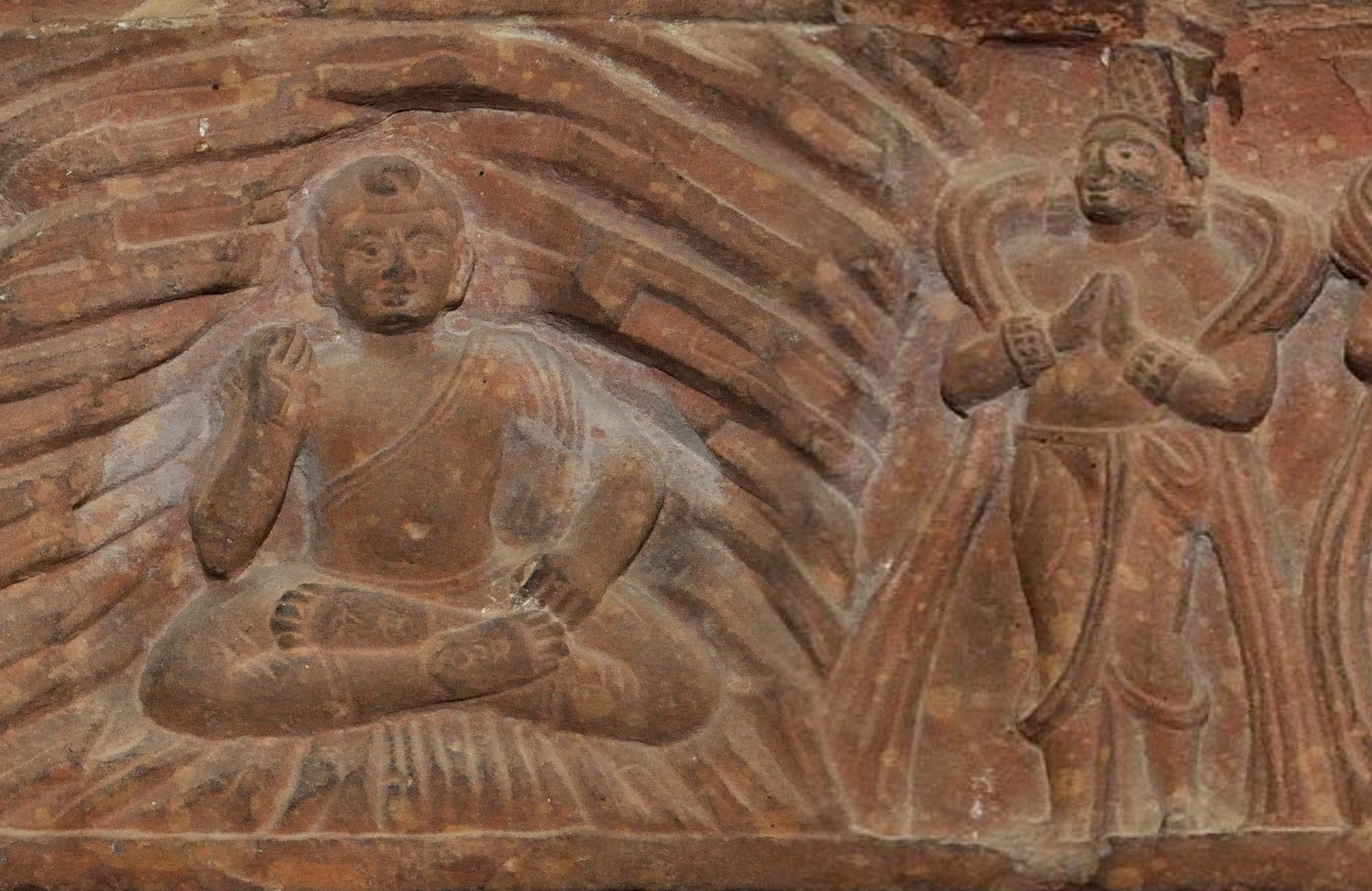
Uttariya and Antriya both are visible.

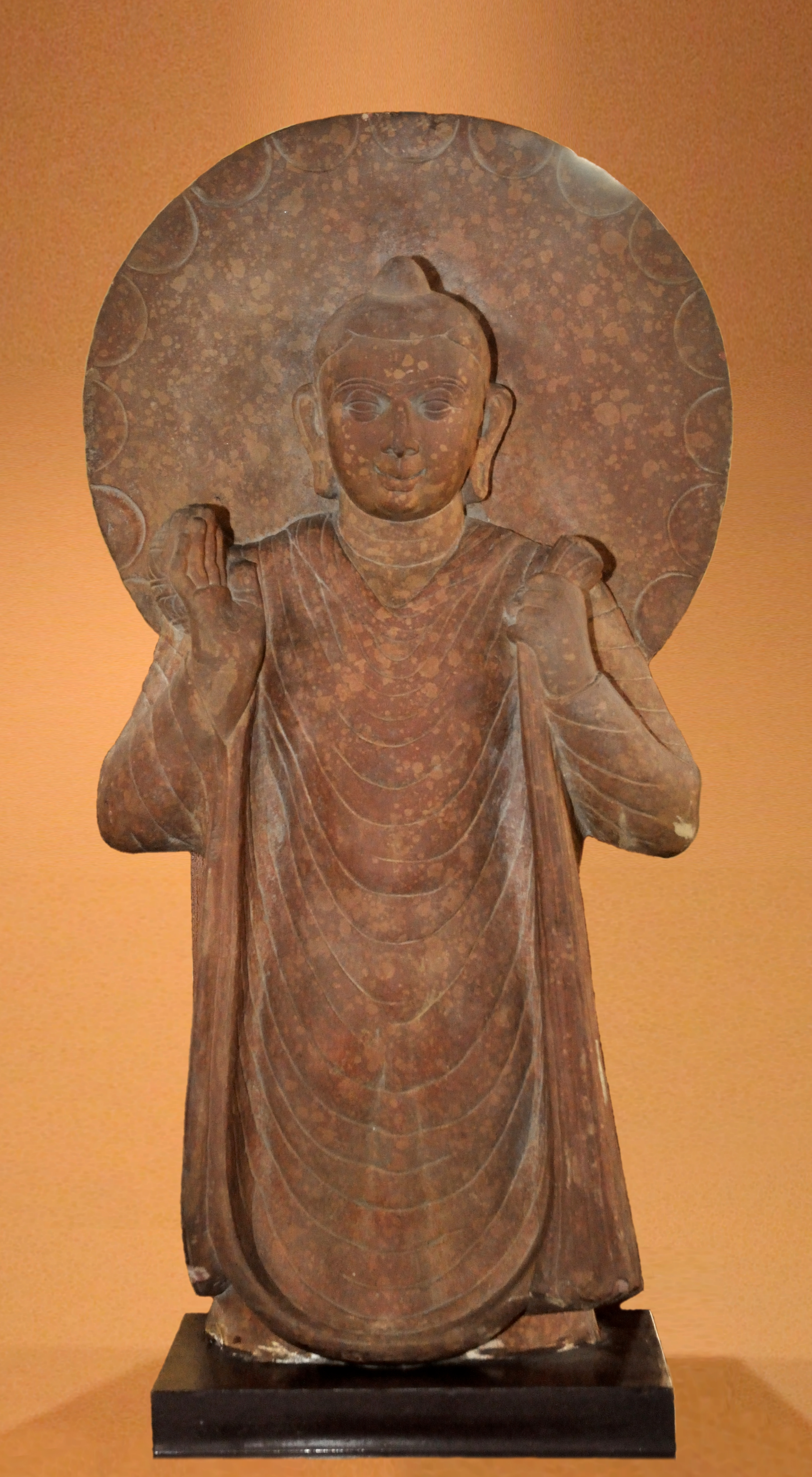
A Mathura standing Buddha in "Samghati" monastic dress, circa 2nd century CE, Mathura Museum

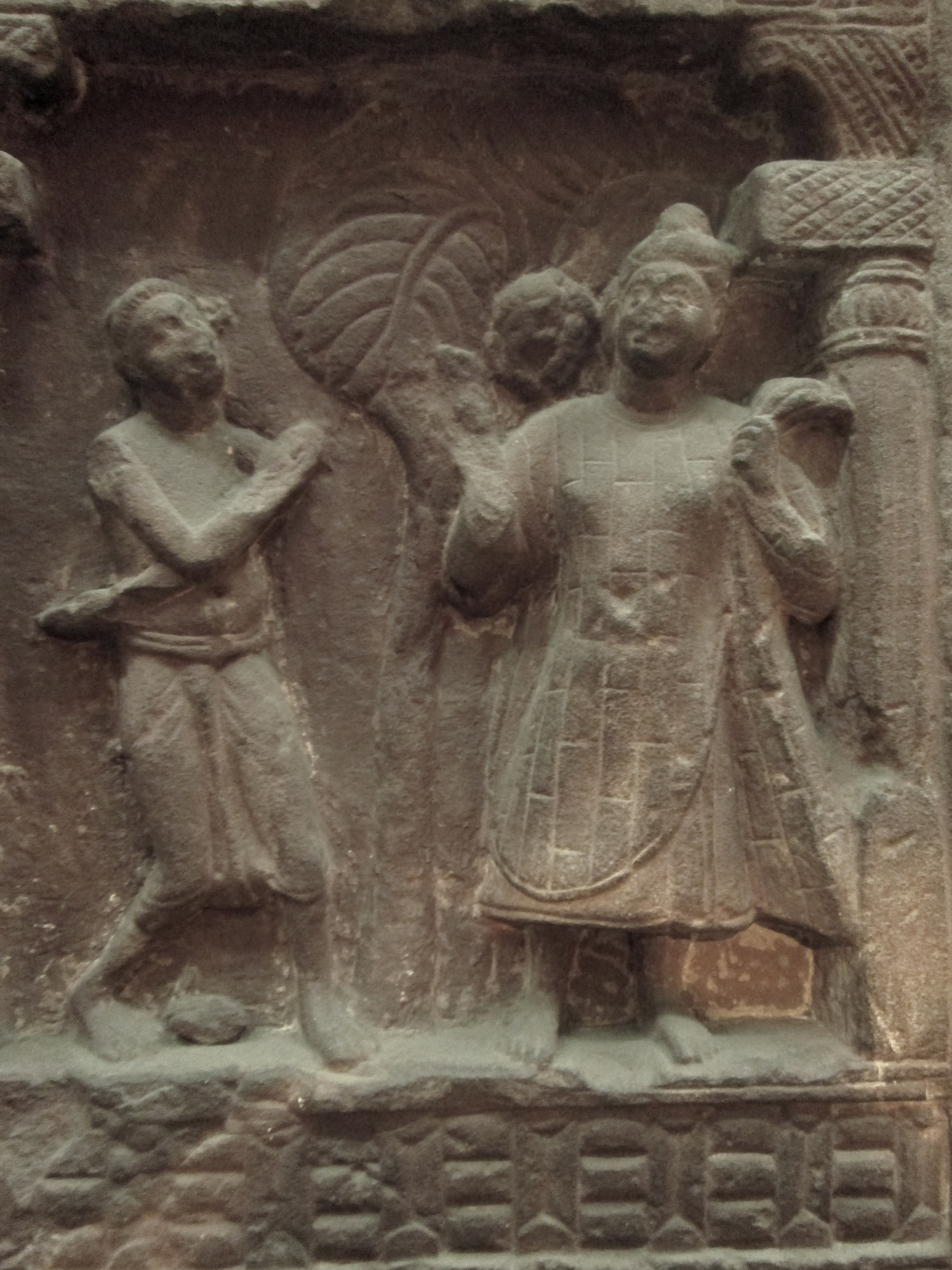
The Buddha in checkered monastic dress in the "Subjugation of Nalagiri", Bhutesvara Yakshis, 2nd century CE, Mathura.

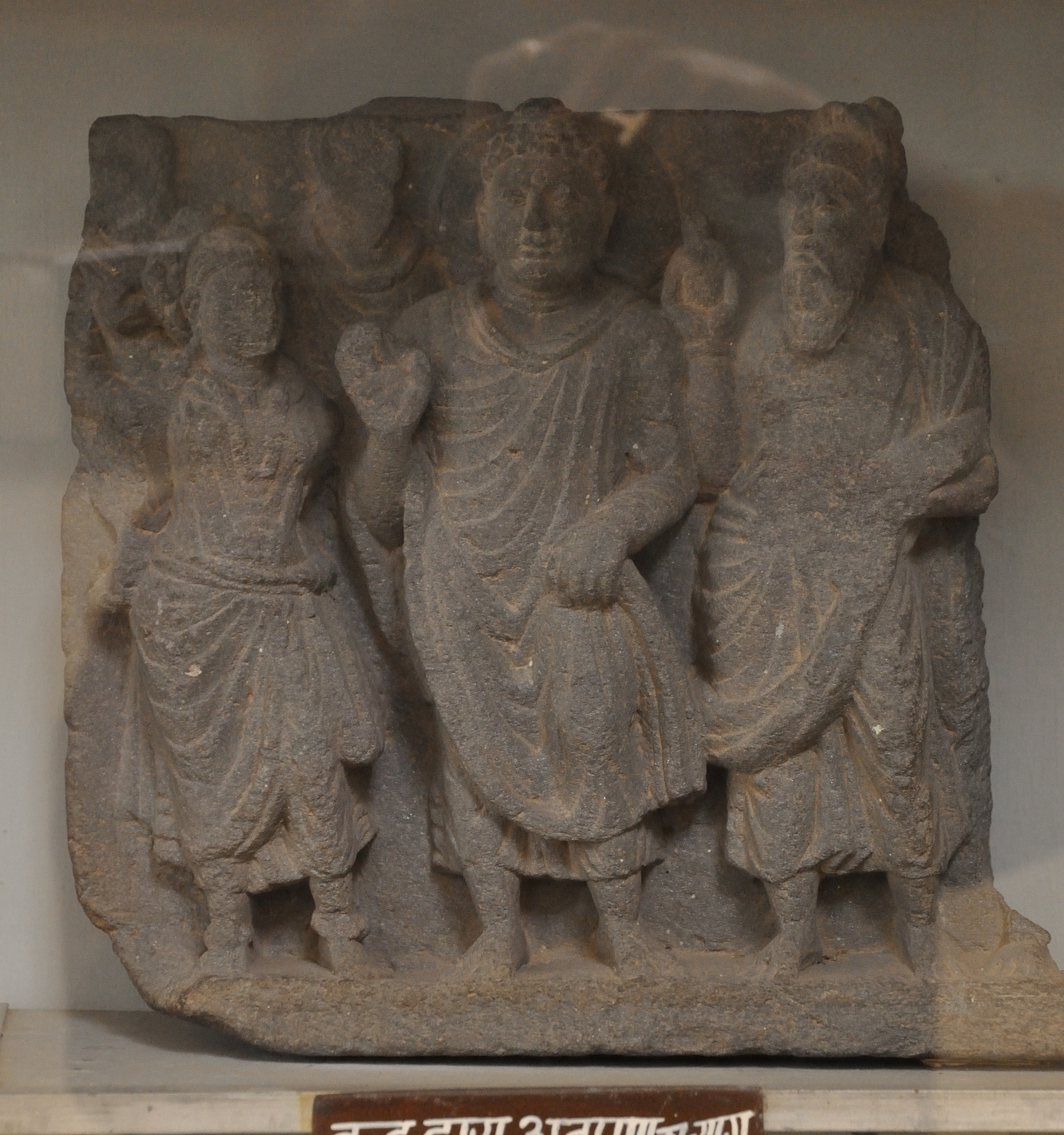
"Buddha Refuses Anupama", late Kushan

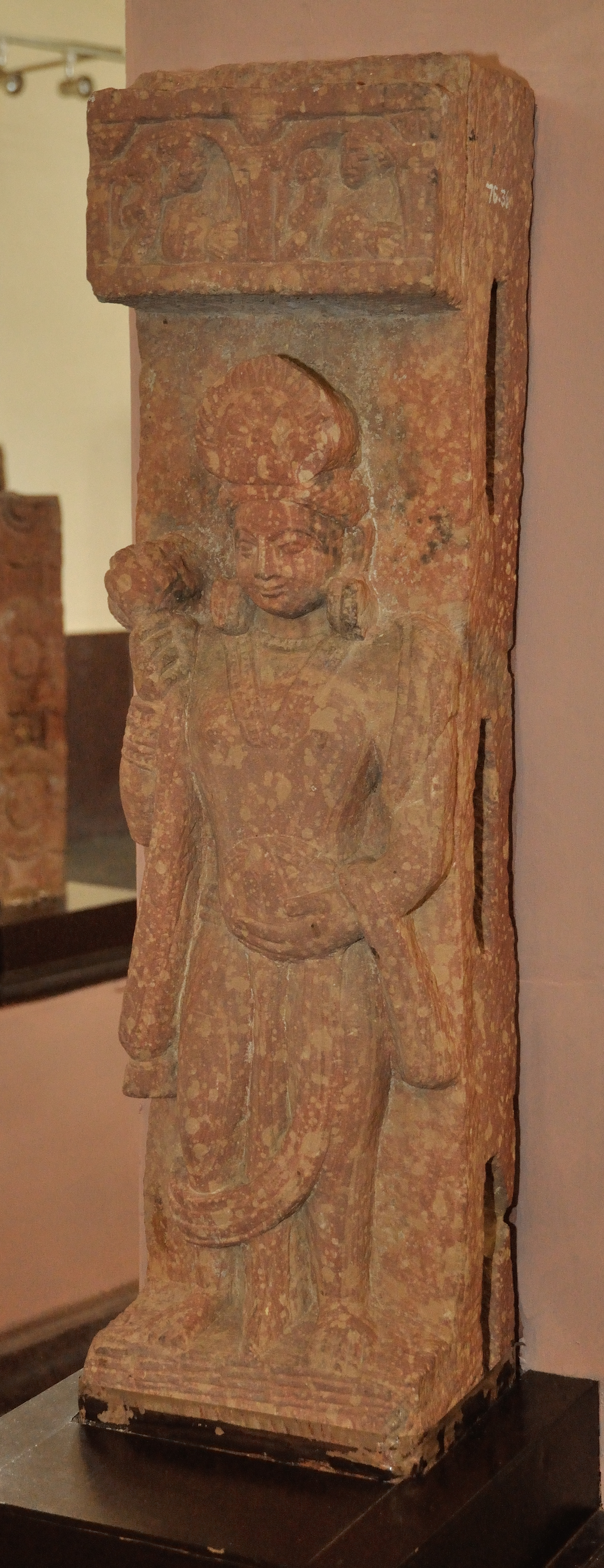
Bodhisattva Avalokitesvara holding lotus flower

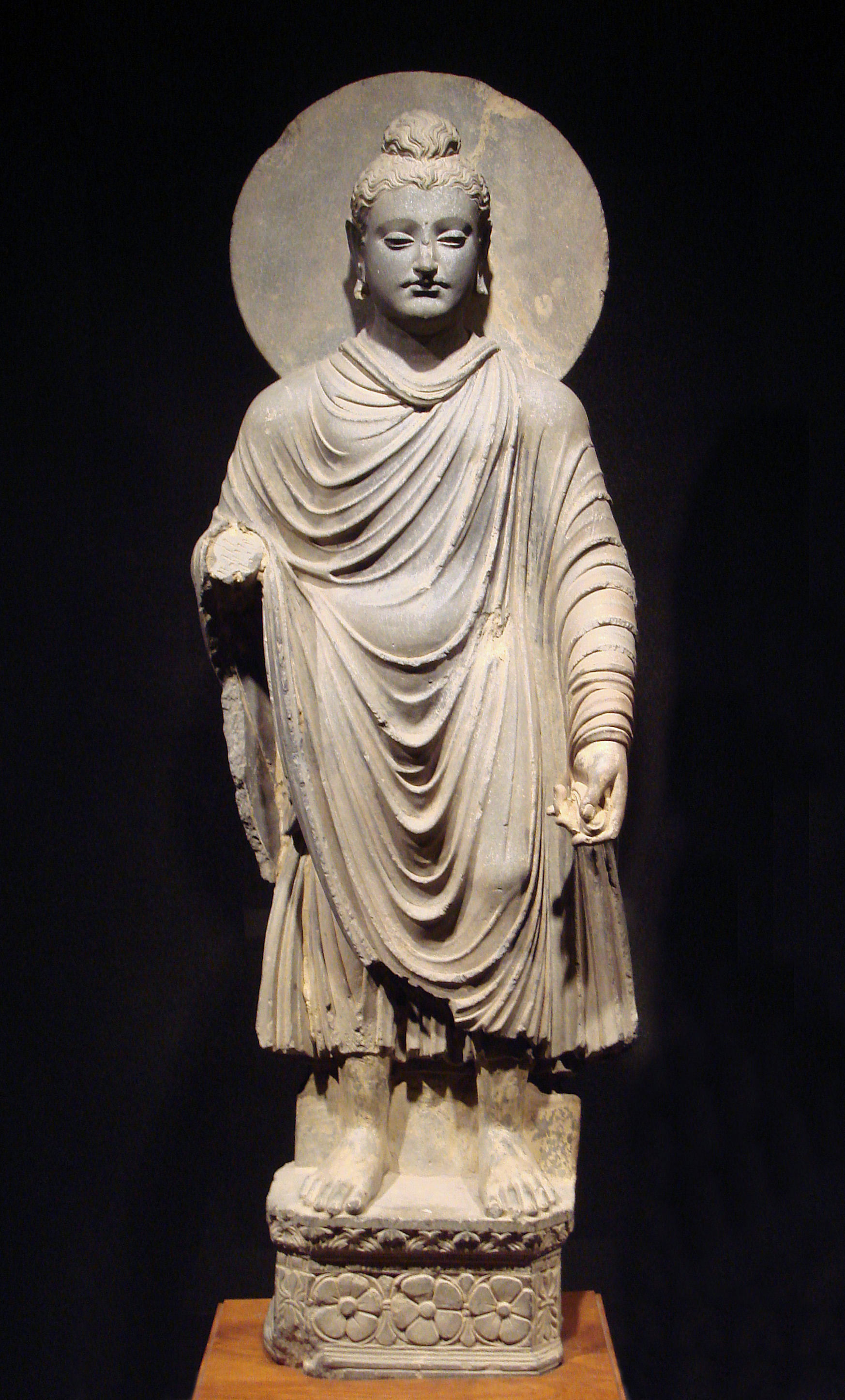
The Buddha wearing kāṣāya robes, c. 200 BCE.

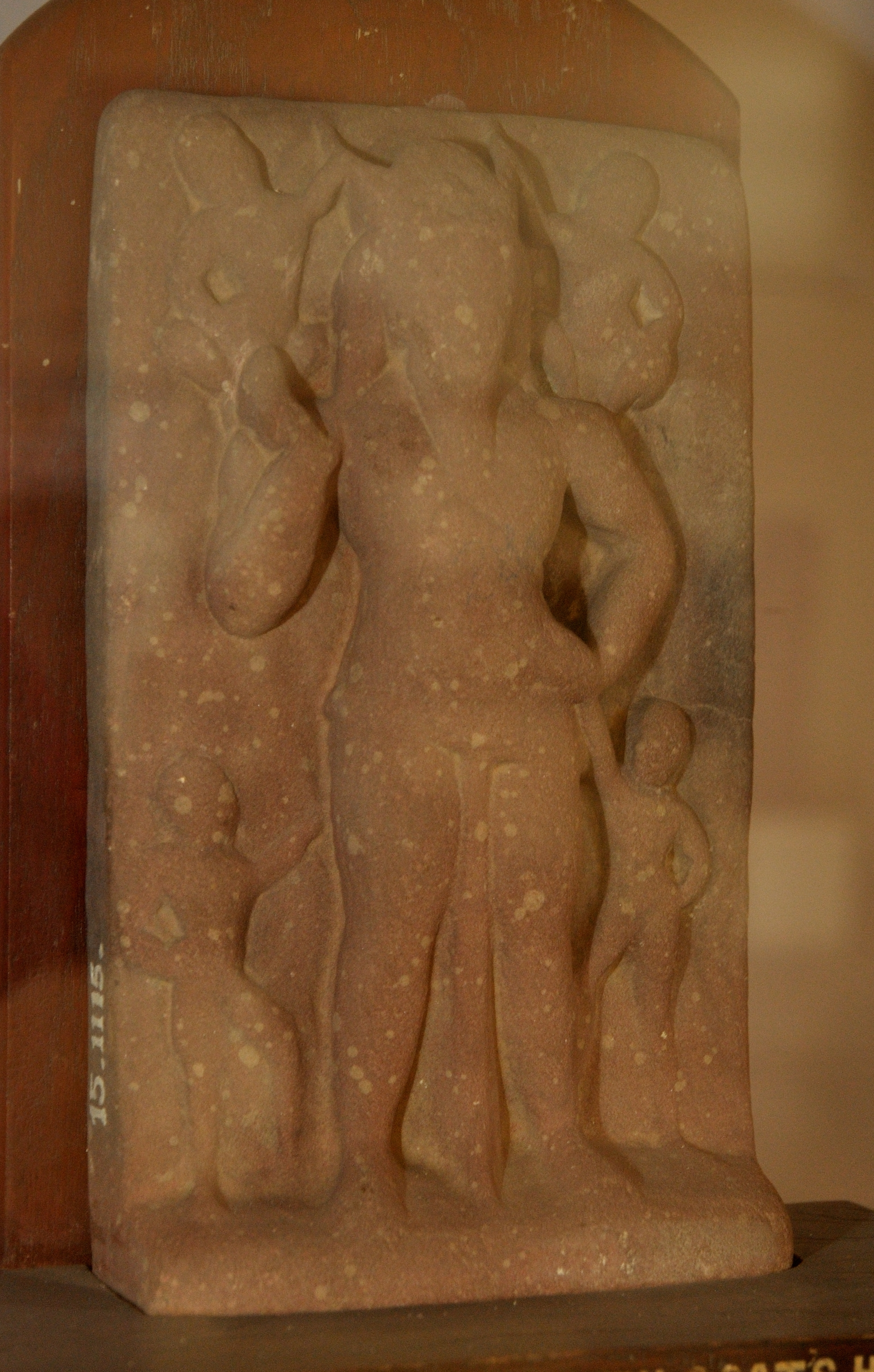
Naigamesha Jain god of Childbirth, 1st-3rd century CE.

==== Poetic references ====
Silapadikkaram indicate that during the Sangam period (third-century BCE to fourth-century CE in ancient South India), a single piece of clothing served as both lower and upper.

=== Evolution ===
With changing times, social norms and the introduction of sewing developed the wraps into many attractive costumes. Uttariya became dupatta, Antriya changed into the skirt (ghagra), and stanapatta became choli. Sari, of course, is evolved from these articles.

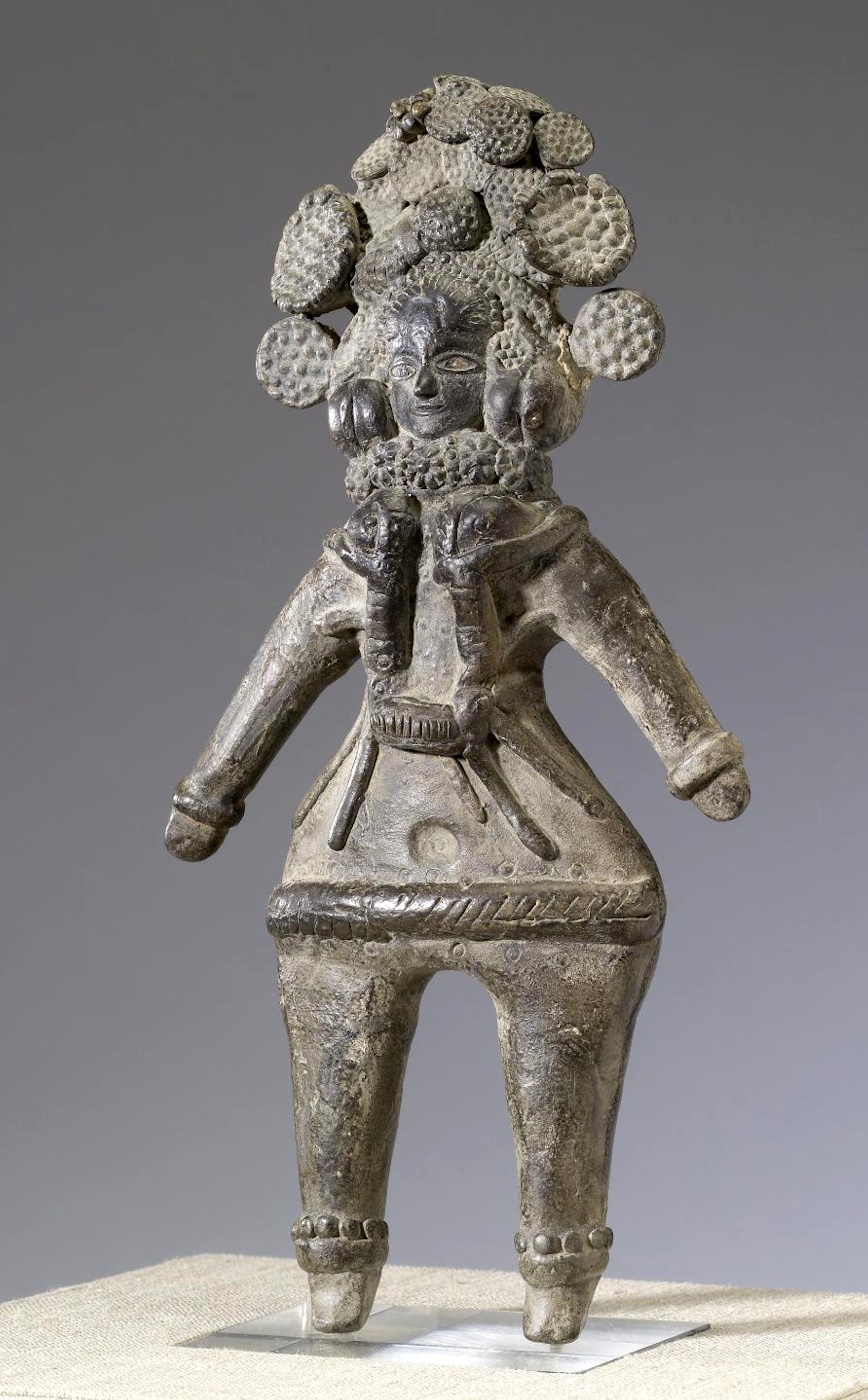
Evidence of stitching, Mathura, 3rd century BCE. A terracotta votive figurine from Mathura. The wide hips and fantastic floral headdress suggest a devotion towards fertility and abundance. She has lotus stalks in her head, and children clinging to her. Height: 25.7 cm (10.1 ″). Mathura, 3rd-2nd century BCE.

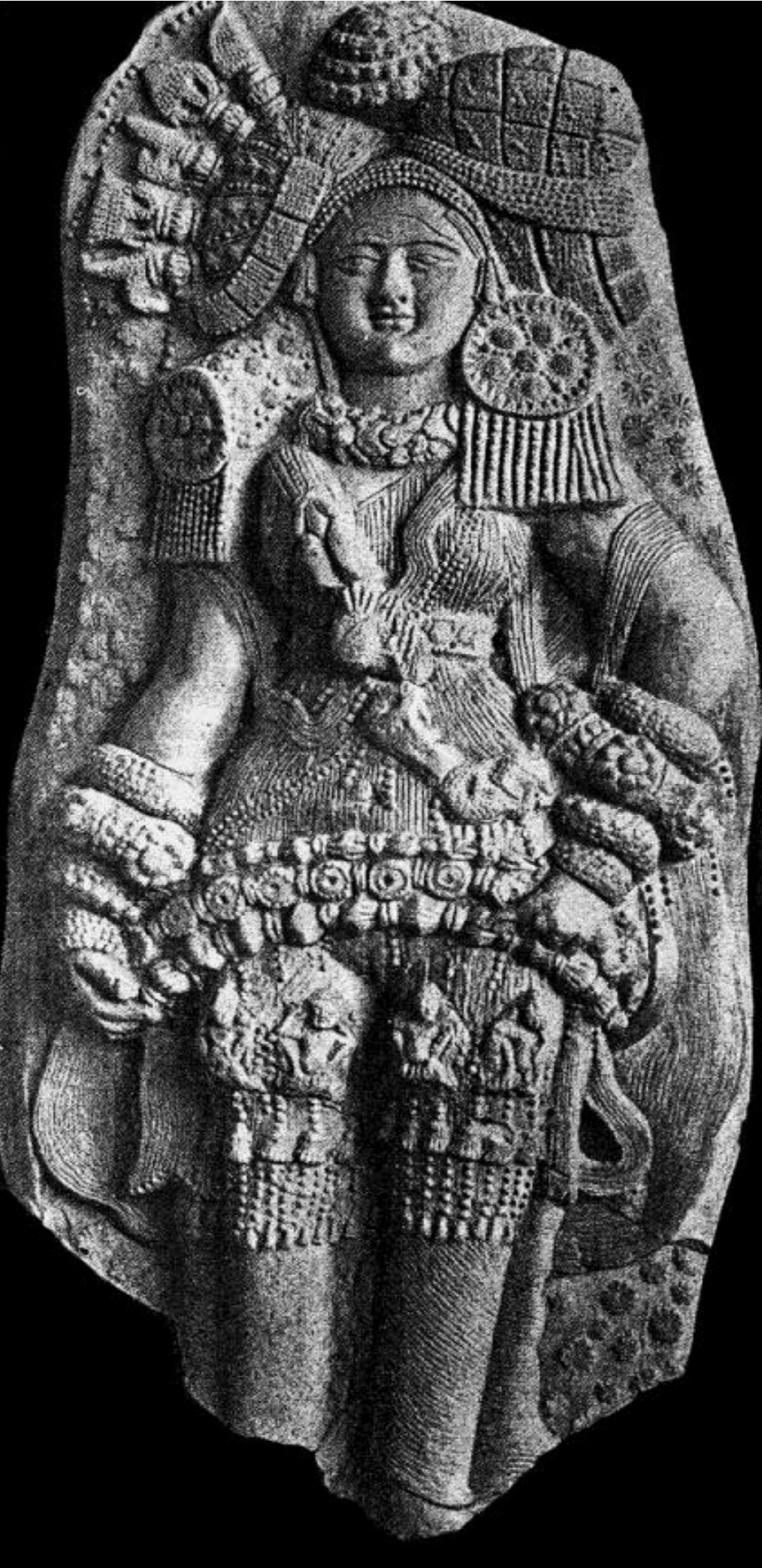
Terracotta figurine in sari drape, 200-100 BCE.

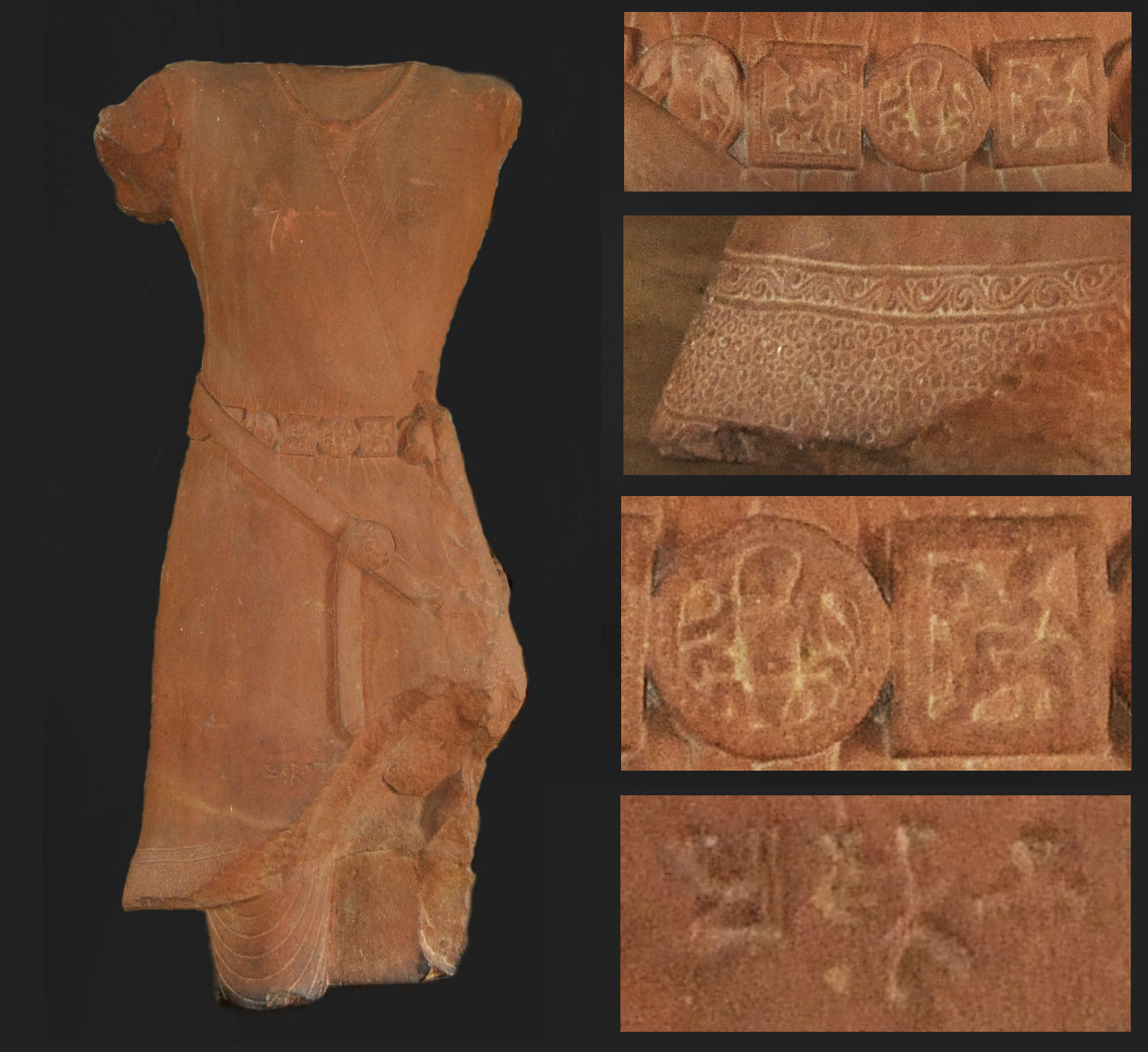
Statue of the Saka Prince Chastana, with costume details. 2nd century CE. Mathura Museum

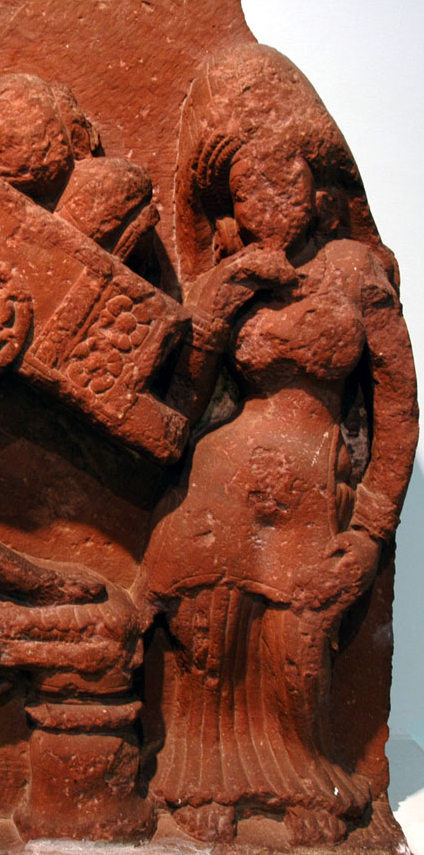
Plaque depicting ancient form of long choli and gagra worn during Gupta Empire

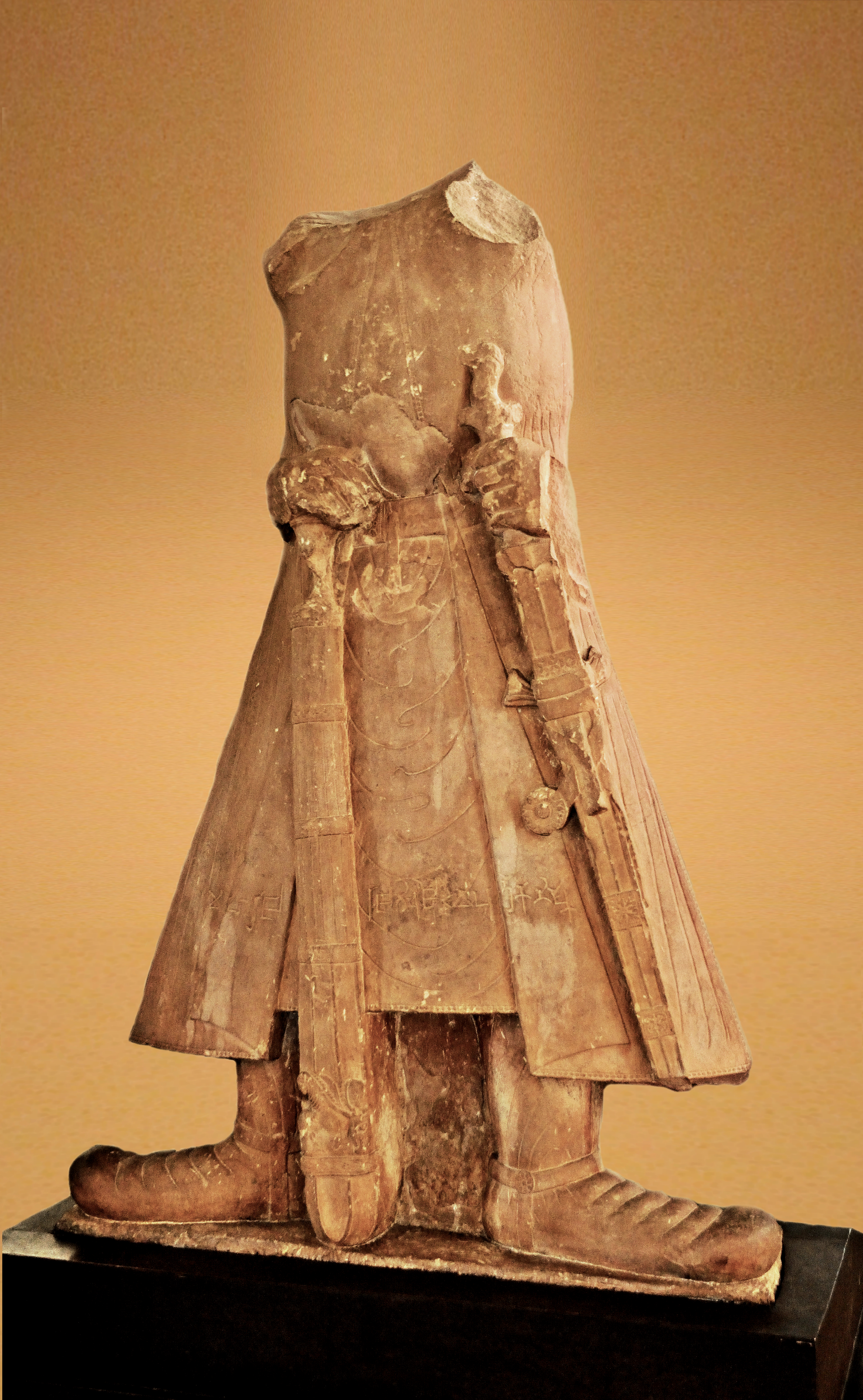
Statue of Kushan emperor Kanishka I (c. 127–150 CE) in long coat and boots, holding a mace and a sword, from the Māt sanctuary in Mathura. An inscription runs along the bottom of the coat: Mahārāja Rājadhirāja Devaputra Kāṇiṣka "The Great King, King of Kings, Son of God, Kanishka"

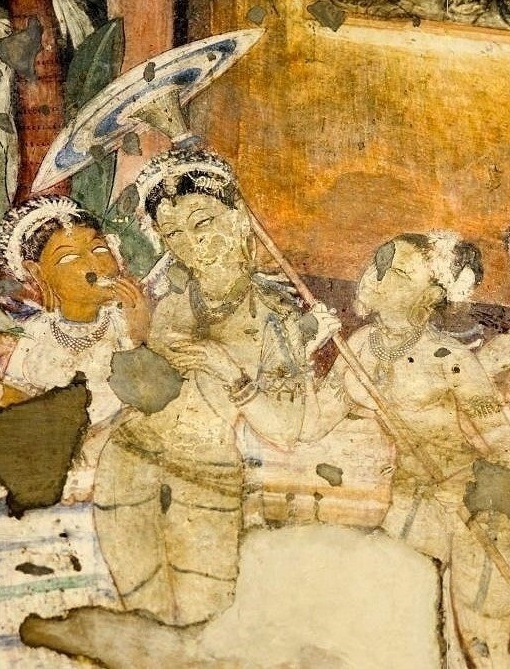
Women in choli (blouse) and antariya c. 320 CE, Gupta Empire

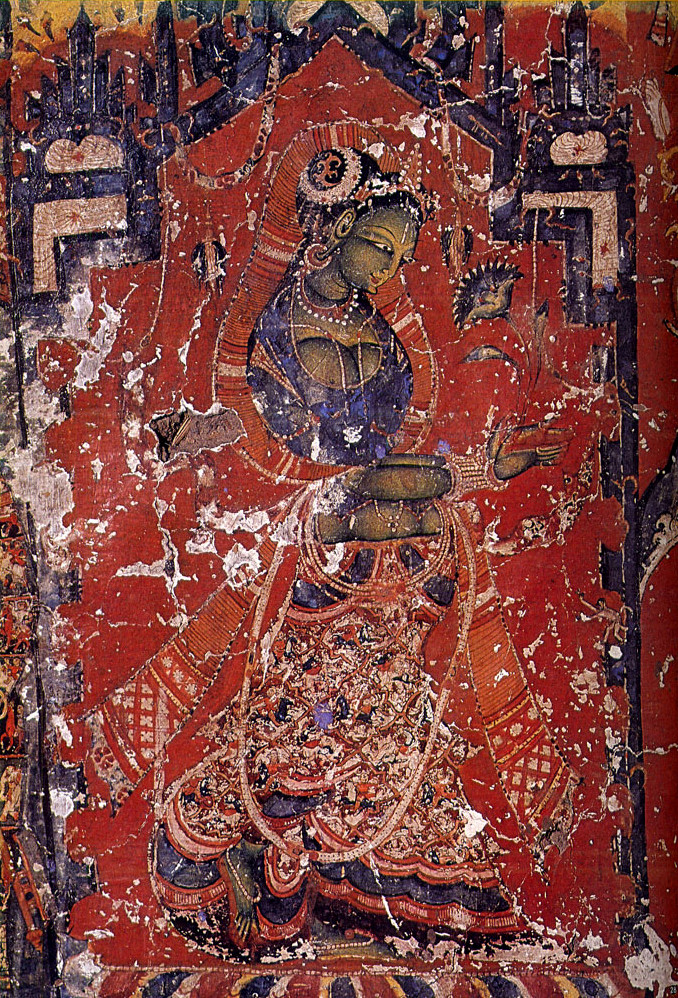
Painting of a Shyama Tara with a three-piece sari from Alchi Monastery.

== See also ==
- Kanchuka, the foremost recorded bodice used in India.
- History of clothing in the Indian subcontinent
- Vedas, ancient scriptures of Hinduism.
