= Wrap (clothing) =

Simple length of fabric worn as clothing

- Type: Simple length of fabric worn as clothing.

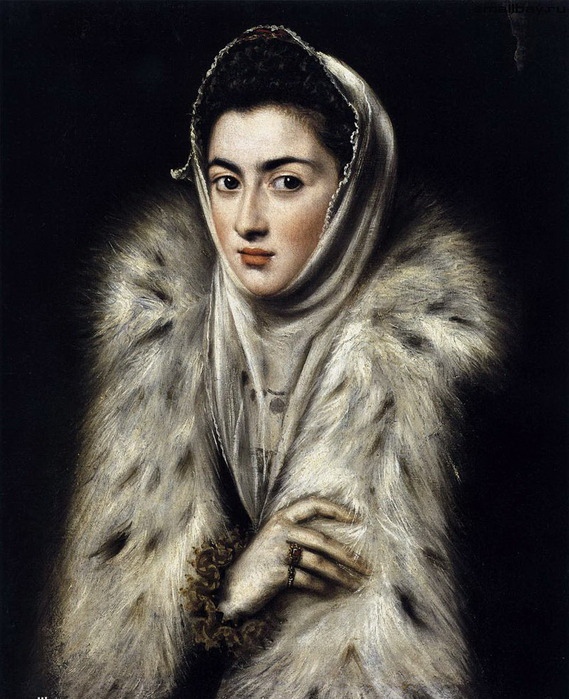
Lady in a Fur Wrap.

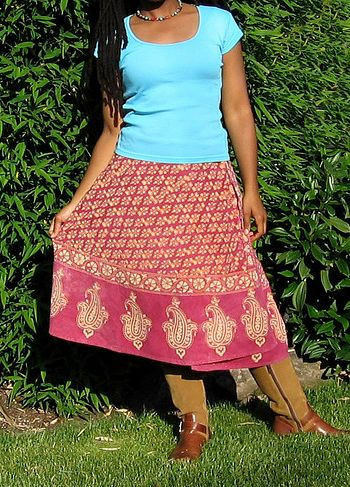
A woman wearing a wrap skirt.

In the context of clothing, a wrap is

- "A loose garment or article of feminine dress used or designed to envelop or fold about the person; a shawl, scarf, or the like."
- "a long piece of cloth worn around the shoulders for warmth or decoration, usually by women"
- "a loose piece of clothing that is worn tied around the body"

It can refer to a shawl or stole or other fabric wrapped about the upper body, or a simple skirt-type garment made by wrapping a piece of material round the lower body. Many people of all genders throughout the world wear wraps in everyday life, although in the West they are largely worn by women. They are sometimes sewn at the edges to form a tube which keeps the required size. A wrap may be secured by a corner being tucked beneath the wrapped material, by making a knot, or using ties, buttons or velcro.

Types of wrap garments include:

- Antriya
- Adivasah
- Uttariya
- Veshti
- Kilt
- Cape, Cloak
- Longyi
- Mundu a garment worn in Kerala, the Tulunadu region, and Maldives.
- Mathabana
- Stanapatta
- Obi (sash)
- Sash
- Palla (garment)
- Pallium (Roman cloak), Toga, Himation, Chiton (costume)
- Pareo — any piece of cloth wrapped around the body, worn by men or women, especially in the Cook Islands and Tahiti.
- Belted plaid
- Sarong and baju kebaya — length of fabric wrapped around the waist and worn by men and women throughout much of South Asia, Southeast Asia, the Arabian Peninsula, the Horn of Africa, and on many Pacific islands.
- Sari
- Ta'ovala — a Tongan dress, a mat wrapped around the waist, worn by men and women, at all formal occasions.

== Modern examples ==
- Beach wraps - in the west, sarongs and towels are sometimes worn as wraps at the beach.
- Wrap skirts - skirts made in the design or style of a wrap.
- Wraps are sometimes worn for doing Yoga.
- Weather wraps, wraps designed to be water- and wind-proof.

== See also ==
- Wrap dress
- Wrap with Love (blankets as clothing)
