= Pratidhi =

Breast cover

Pratheedhi, a loose garment was a part of the bride's attire made of simple strip of cloth. Pratidhi was an unstitched garment similar to almost all contemporary clothes that were wrapped around the body in different ways. The women were fastening it up at the back. The materials were usually animal skin, cotton, wool, or silk.

== Style ==
The Pratidhi is a garment of the Vedic period (1500 and 500 BCE). The Vedas have stated many clothes; indeed, those all were unsewn clothes and wraps in varied ways, such as Uttariya, Adivasah, and Antariya. Concurrently Atharvaveda refers to Nivi, Vavri, Upavasana, Kumba, Usnlsa, and Pratidhi as underwear.( RV. x. 85. 8)

These clothes were varying with the material, size, and style of wrapping and draping. Pritidhi was smaller, with one or two strips of cloth pulled over or across on the bust and tied on the back.

== See also ==
- Rigveda
- Shatapatha Brahmana
