= Nivi (garment) =

Lower garment worn around a women's waist

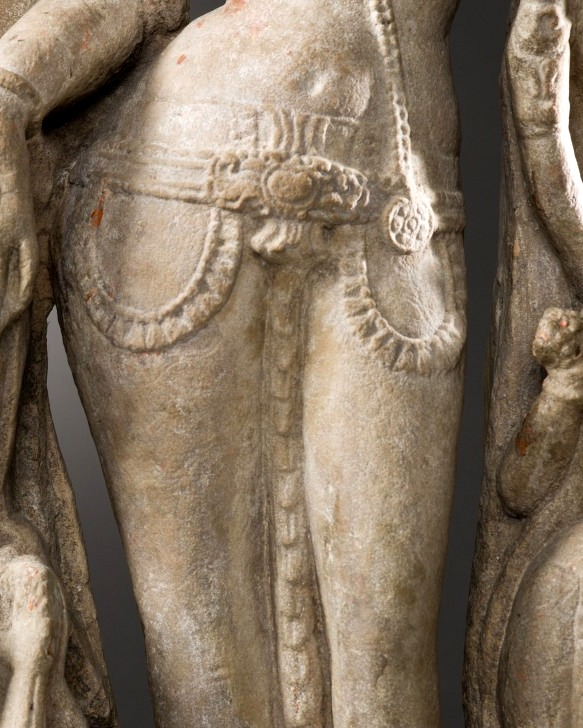
Nivi-bandha worn with over-lapping pleats and secured with kaṭibandha or kaṭisūtra, an ornamental belt, 9th century.

Nivi (nīvī, निवी, नीवी) was a women's garment. It was a simple piece of cloth draped or worn around the waist, covering the lower part of the body. It was worn with a Uttariya veil, stanapatta, or the loose end of nivi wrapped over the shoulder.

Nivi was worn in two styles; Sakaccha where the front hem of the pleats is passed between the legs and tucked at the back, and Vikaccha where nivi is worn without the rear tuck, hanging more like a sarong with pleats in the front.

== Etymology ==
Nīvi in Sanskrit means a lower garment worn around a women's waist.

== Garment ==
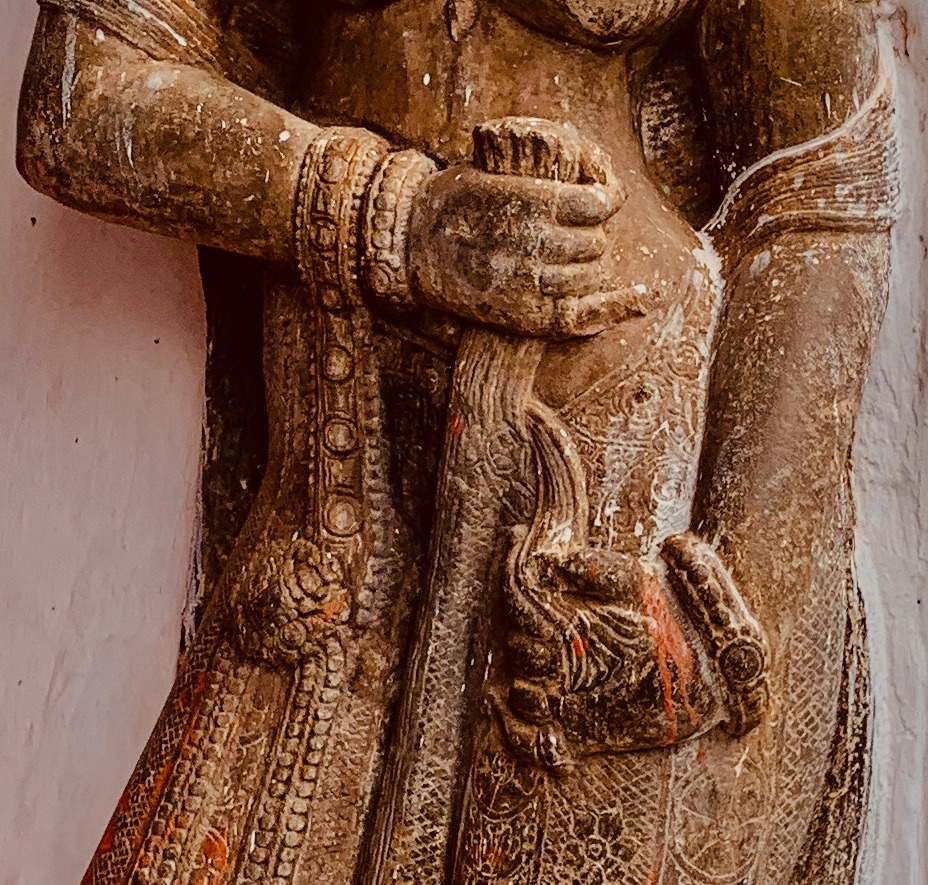
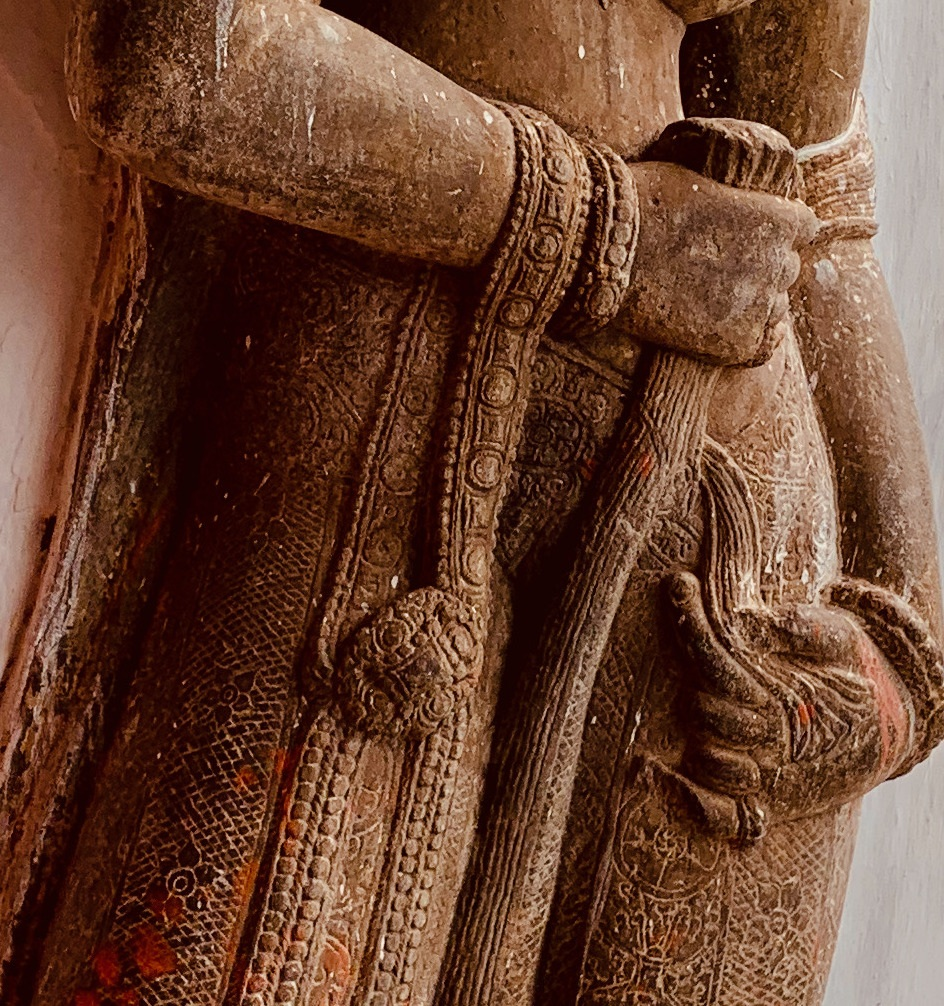
Woman in the process of wearing Nivi-Bandha with over-lapping pleats. The ornamental belt hangs on her right arm. ca. 6th-7th century.

Draping and wrapping were the accustomed forms of ancient Indian clothing.

Vedas describes contemporary clothes according to the use and style of wrapping. Uttariya refers to an upper-body garment, Adivasah as an over garment, and Vasa as a lower body garment. Hence Nivi could be categorized in Vasa, that was a simple rectangular piece of clothing.

== Style ==
=== Nivi drape ===
The ladies were encircling the nivi around the waist with tucked ends. It was an inner wrap for the lower body for women, leaving the upper part bare, draped with Uttariya veil or the loose end of Nivi. In old couture, it was also called 'nivi bandha.'

== Gallery ==
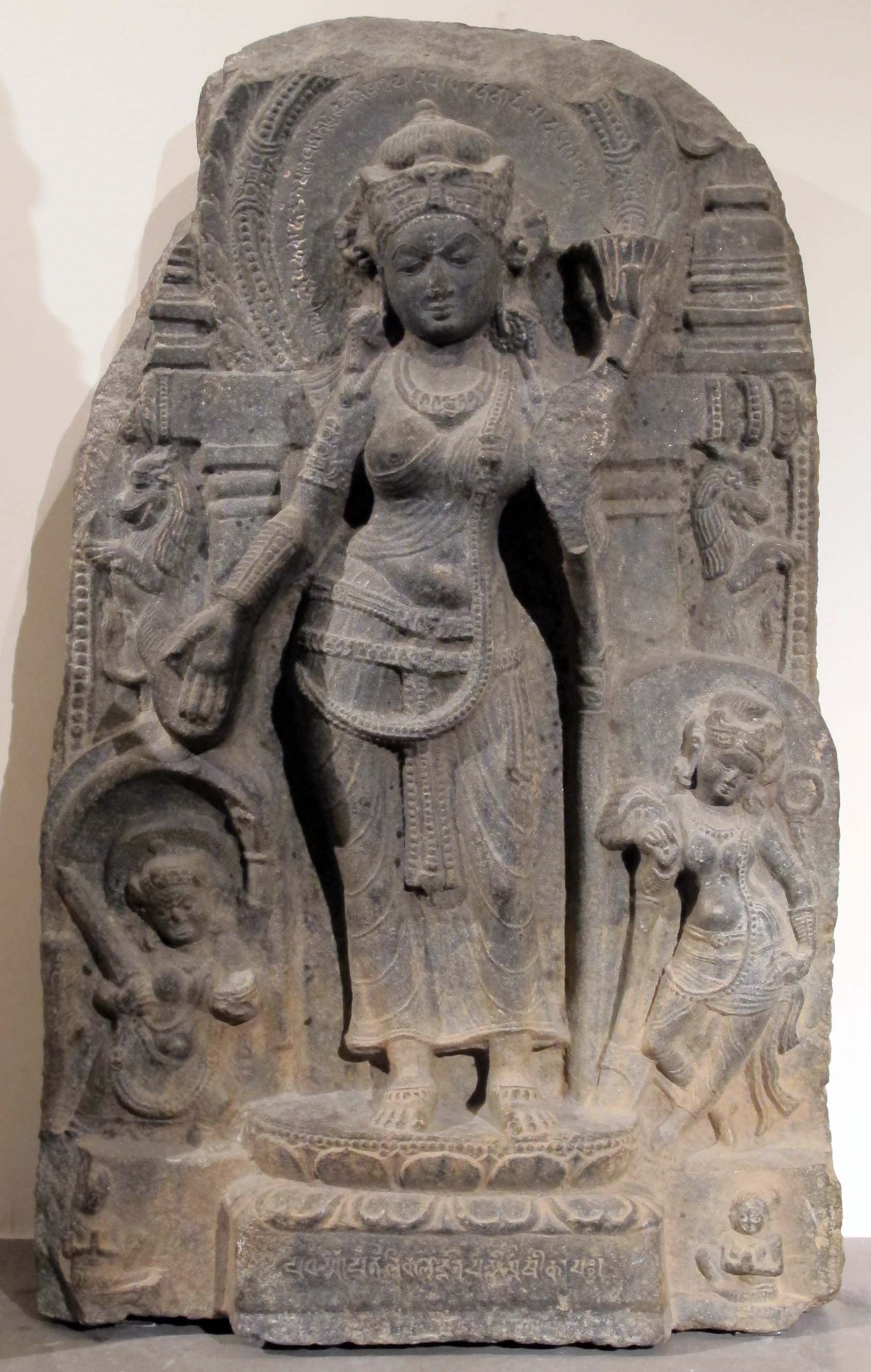
Tara dipicted in nivi bandha, loose end of nivi draping over shoulder, 9th century.

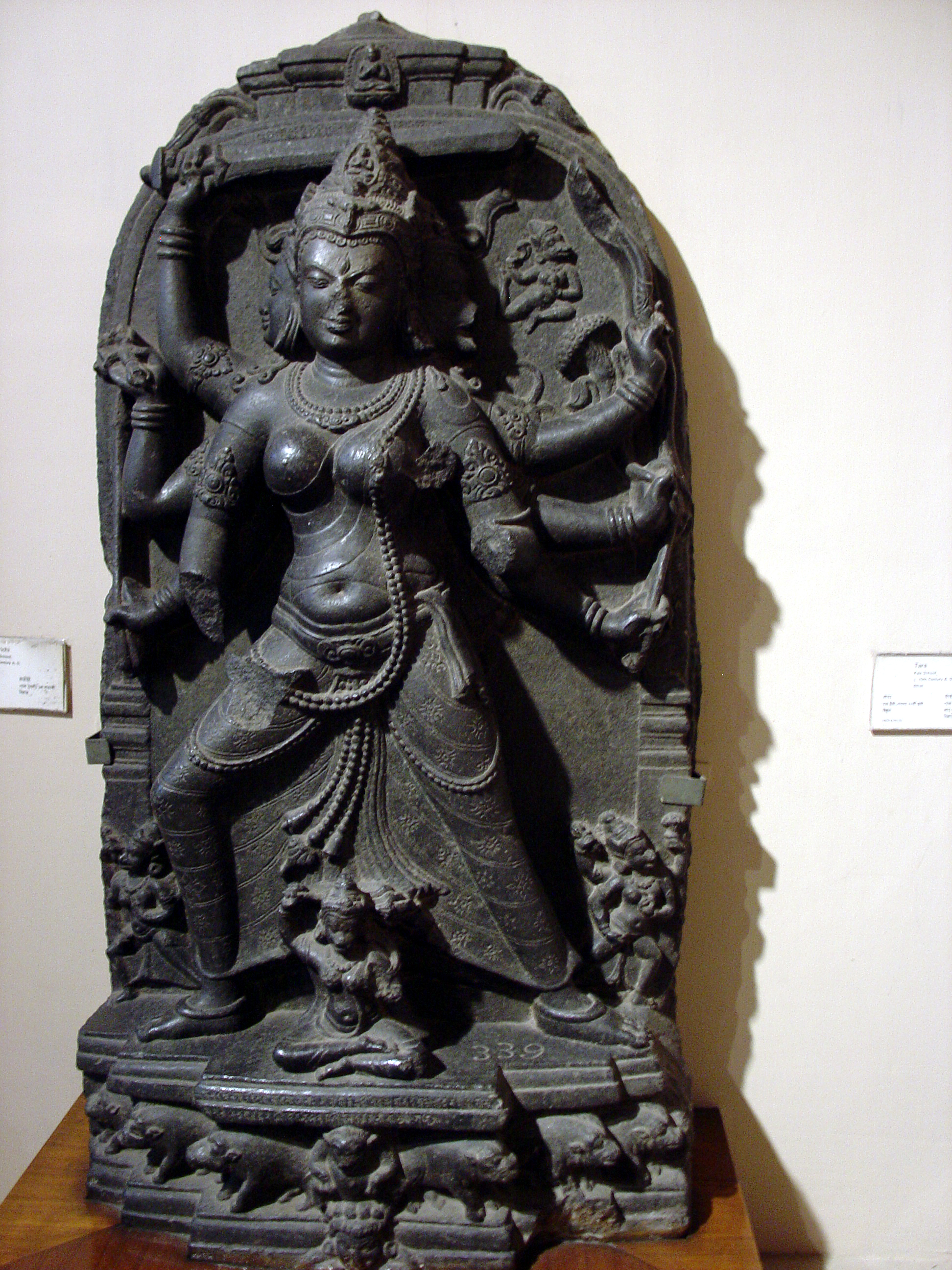
Goddess Marichi depicted with nivi bandha drape, loose end of nivi draping over shoulder and choli bodice, 9th century.

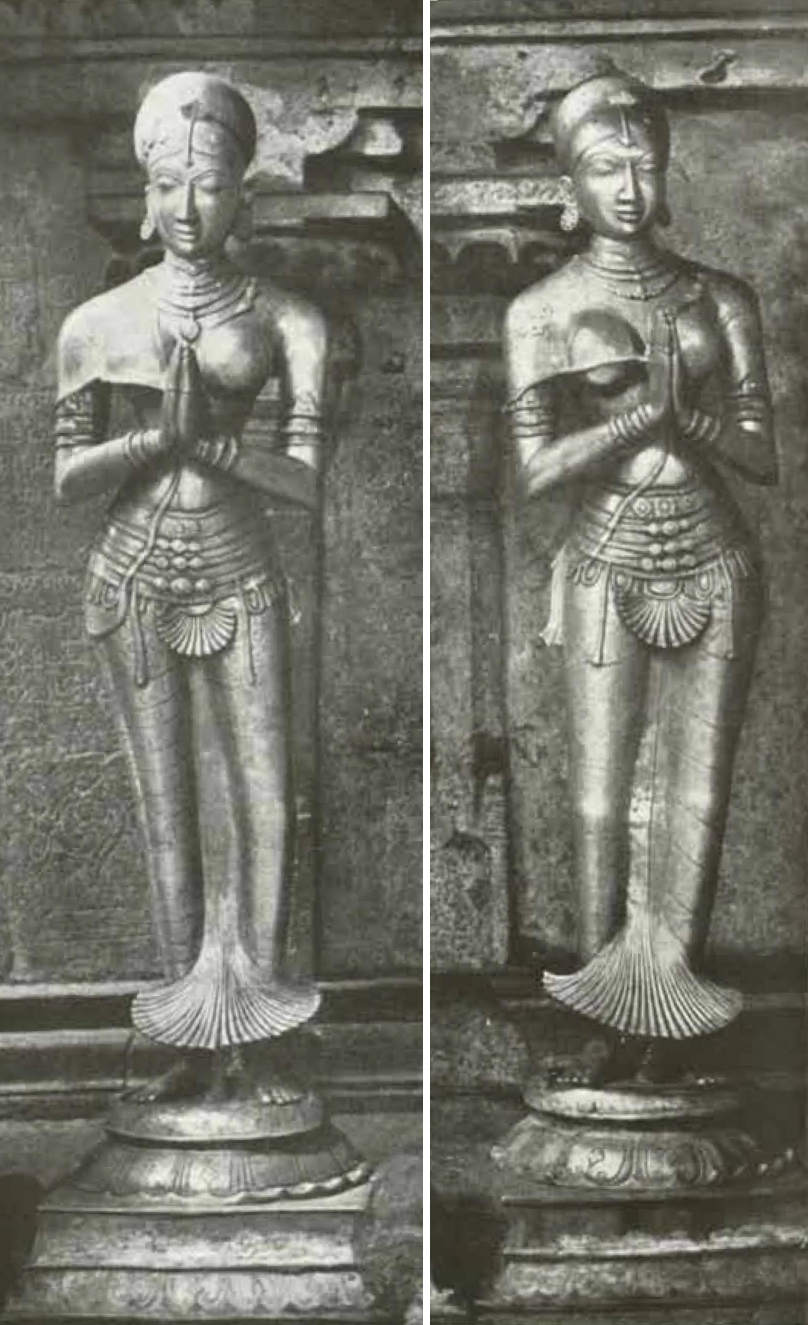
Bronze portraits of Queens Chinna Devi and Tirumala Devi dressed in nivi sari; note the over-lapping pleats and dense pleating, Deccan, ca. 1518.

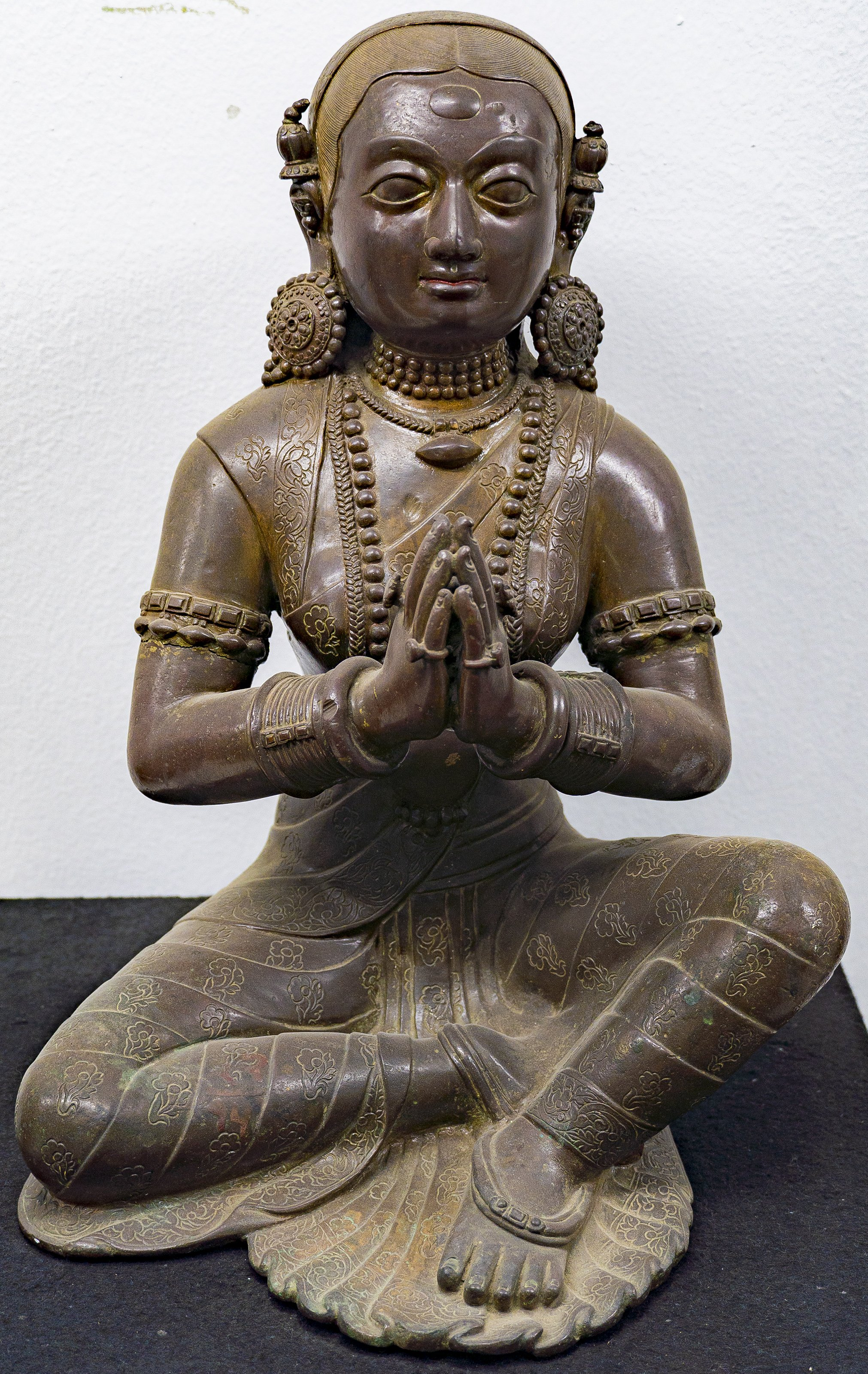
Bronze portrait of Malla Queen dressed in nivi, ca. 1696-1722

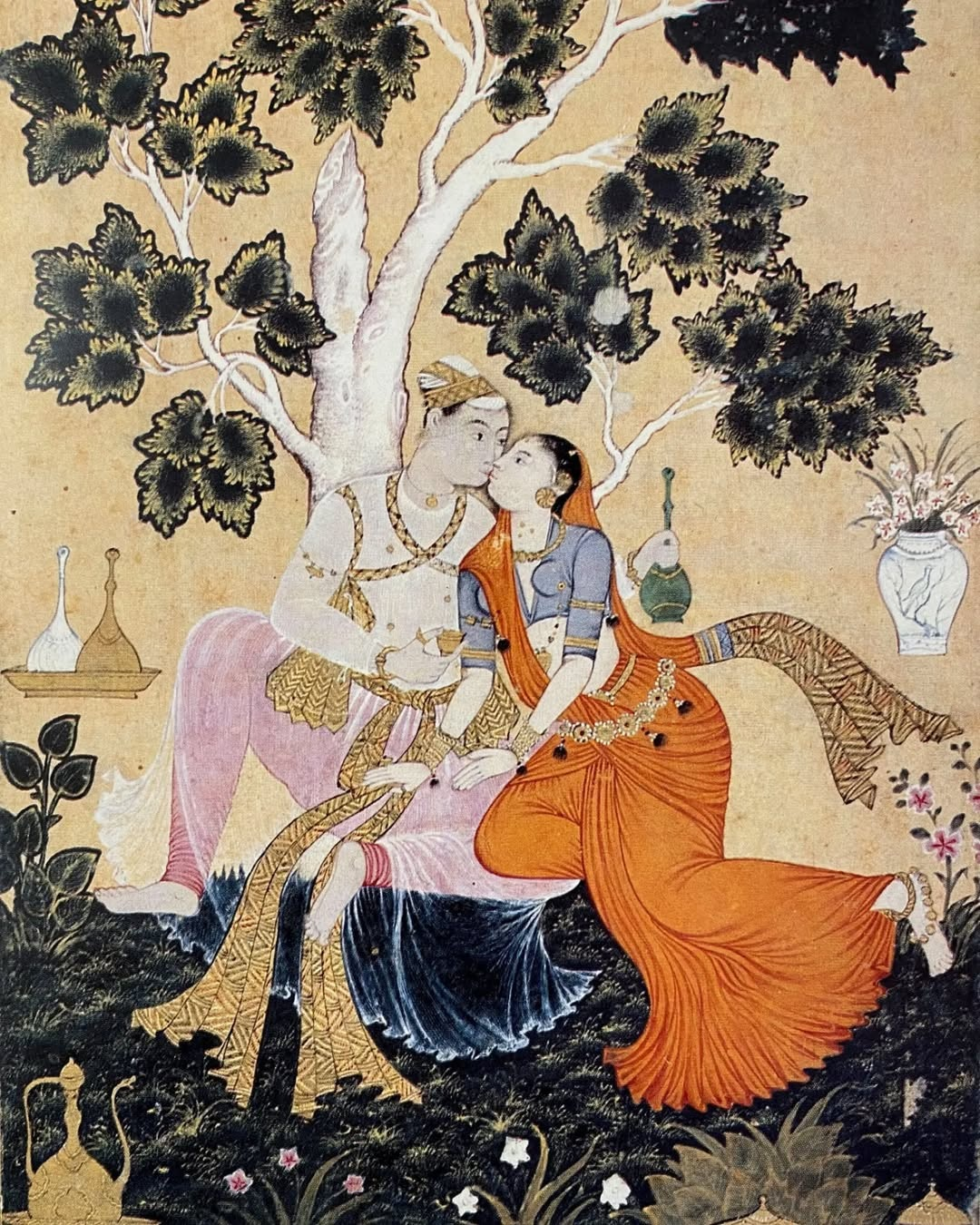
Woman dressed in nivi sari, Deccan, ca. 1600

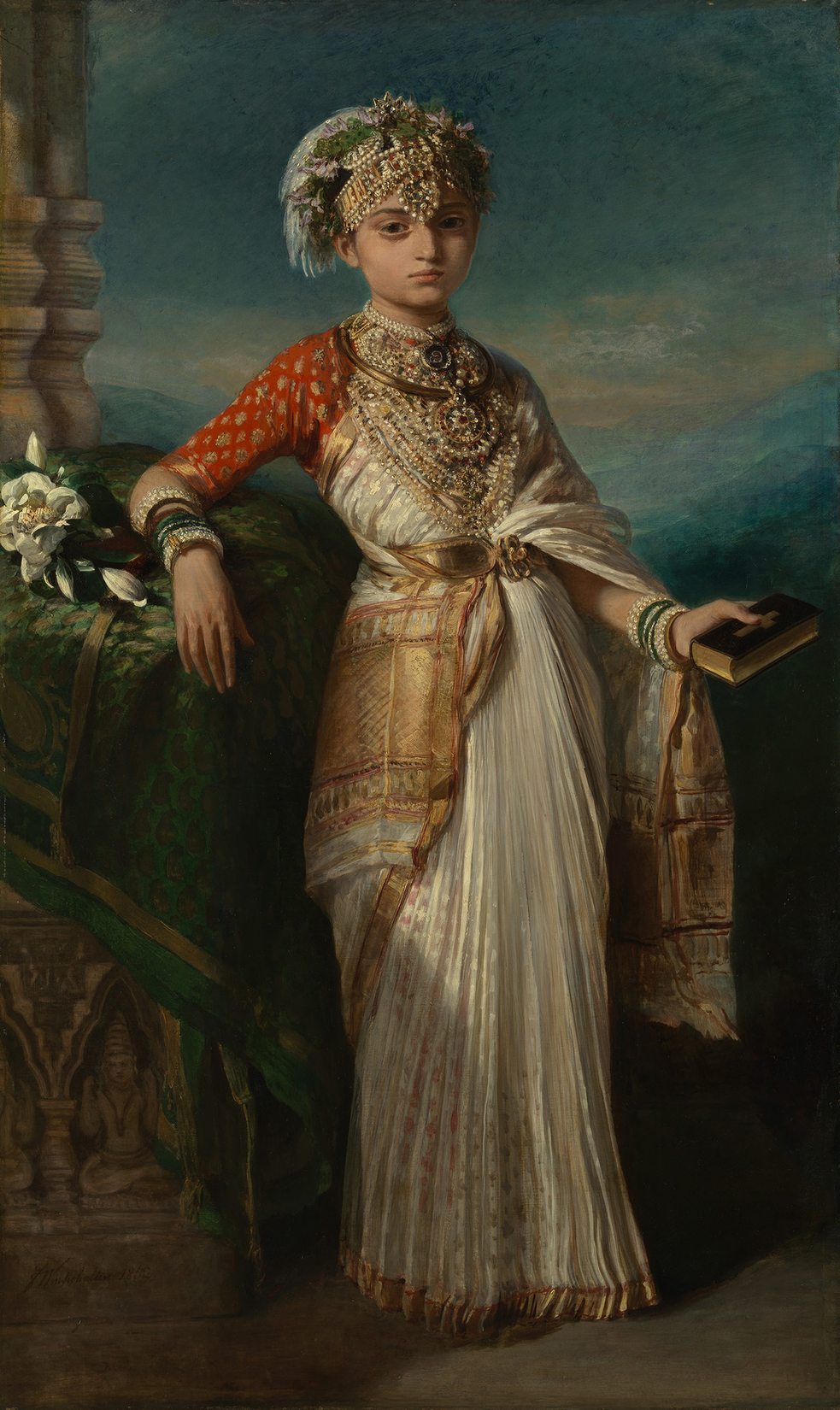
Princess Gouramma dressed in nivi, Deccan, ca 1852.

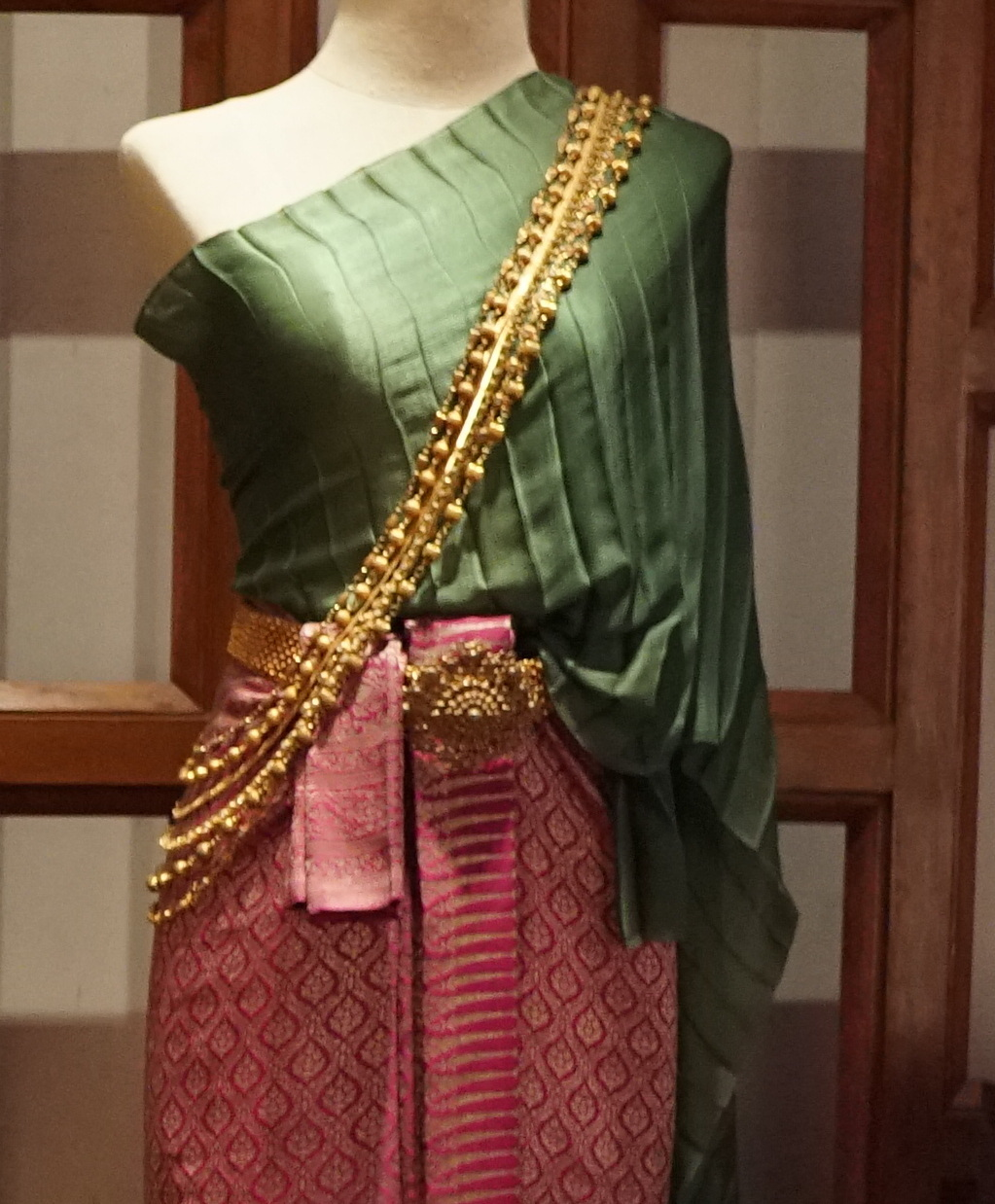
Detail of over-lapping pleats, nivi-influenced garment as seen in Chut Thai traditional dress of Thailand.

== See also ==
- Uttariya
- Vadhuya
