= Visite =

Women's outer garment, popular in 19th century

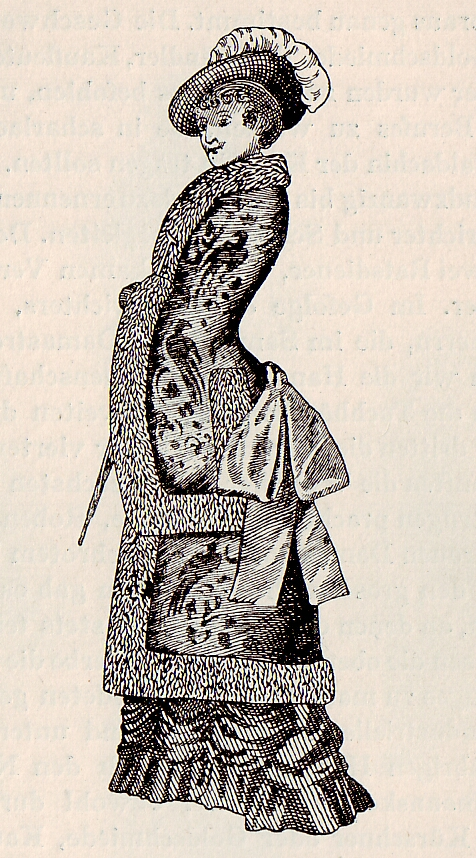
A visite in silk trimmed with beaver fur, 1885

A visite is a specific type of woman's outer garment similar to a mantle or wrap. It was particularly popular in the late 19th century, being specifically designed to accommodate the then fashionable bustle. The visite replaced the huge shawls that had previously been worn over large crinoline skirts, combining shawl and coat elements, and was even on occasion made using shawls that were valuable but no longer fashionable.
