= Kanchuka =

Earlier version of Choli

kanchuka (Kanchuka, Kanchuli) was an upper-body garment, both half and full-sleeved jacket of a long length reaching the hips or even longer to the knee length. Kanchuka, because of its fit also defined as a soldier's dress. Rank ladies and young girls used the garment.

== Types ==
Kanchuka has been proclaimed since the rule of king Harsha (1st century) in Kannauj. The records refer to the garment as the foremost recorded bodice used in India.The Basava Purana (1237 A.D.) suggests that young girls were also wearing the same. Bāṇabhaṭṭa states it as a very lightweight garment.

== See also ==
- Adivasah
- Uttariya
