= Stanapatta =

Chest band

Women dressed in Stannapatta, Gupta-period, 4th century.

Goddess Durga dipicted with decorative Stanapatta (detail).

Stanapatta (Stanmasuka) was a loose wrap cloth for the upper body. It was a chest band used in ancient India. It was a simple upper garment of the females during the ancient time similar to the strophium or mamillare used by the Roman women. Stanapatta was a part of Poshaka (the women's attire). Kālidāsa mentions kurpasika, another form of breastband that is synonymized with uttarasanga and stanapatta by him. Innerwears for lower parts were called nivi or nivi bandha. The Skandamata sculpture of Malhar depicts the use of stanapatta and kanchuki in ancient times. Similar surviving garment wrapped around the chest by women is called "Risha" in Tripura.

== Style ==
The garment was used by women to cover the breasts. It was also decorated with embellishments and worn with many successor clothes of uttariya, for instance, Sari. Stanapatta changed with the time; few evolved forms are choli or blouse.

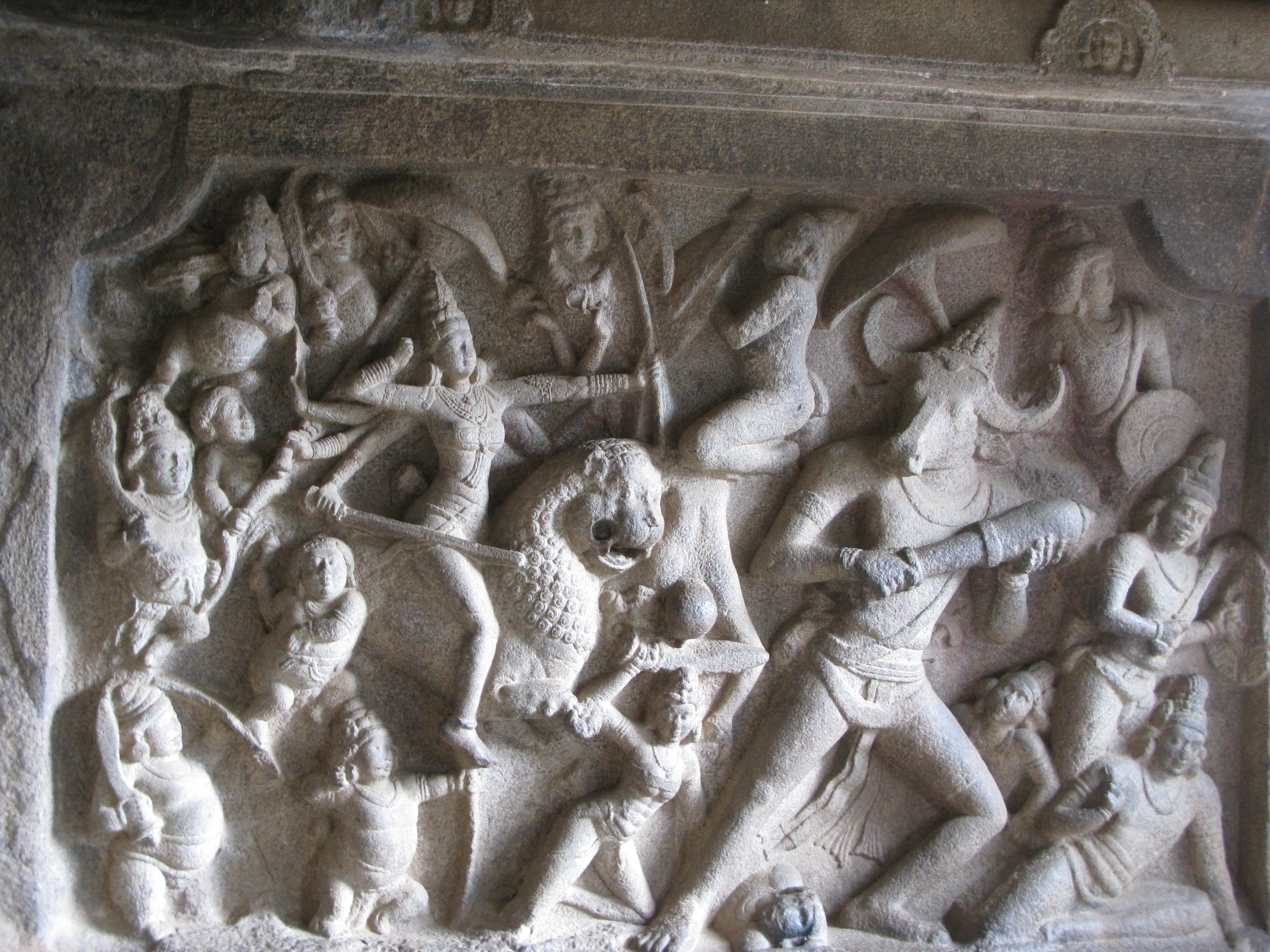
Goddess Durga dipicted with stanapatta chest-band, 8th century.

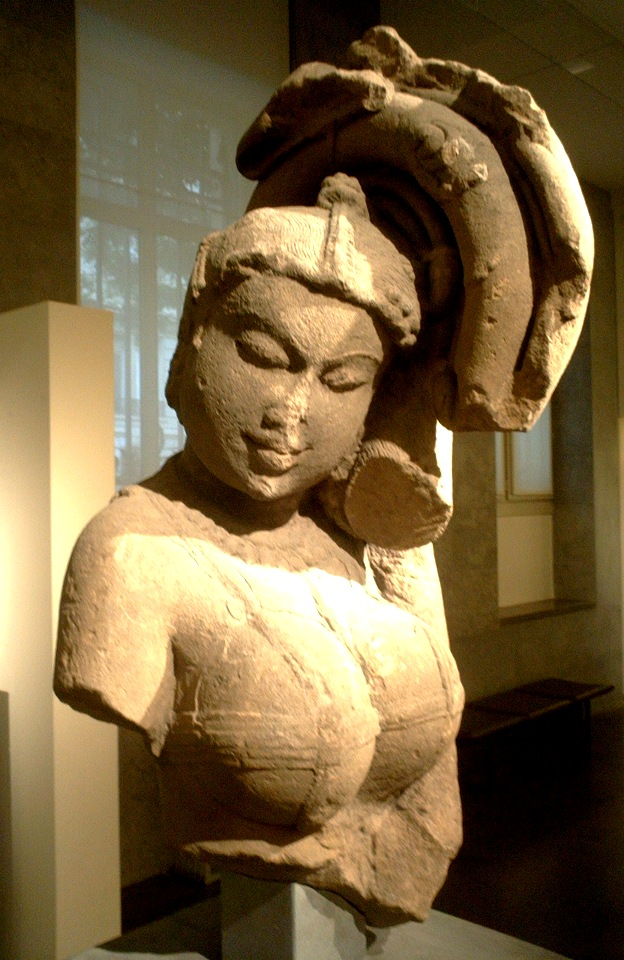
Stanapatta worn around chest

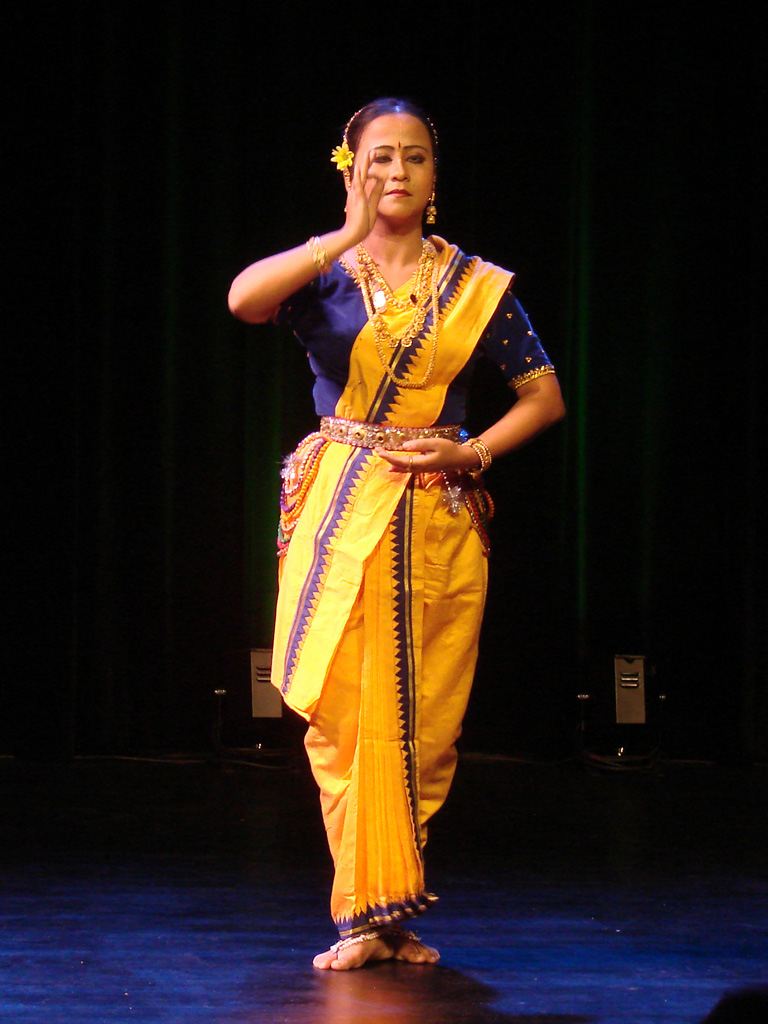
Indian dancer depicted with example of stanapatta worn across chest.

== See also ==
- Uttariya
- Choli
- Antariya
- Adivasah
