= Vadhuya =

Bridal dress in the Vedic period in India

A Vadhuya was a kind of bridal dress in the Vedic period in India. It was made of cotton, wool, and animal skin. After the ceremony, the wedding dress was given to a Brahmin.

== Raiment of Vedic Aryans ==
The study of vedic literature reveals that the vedic Aryans were fond of ornaments and were well dressed, they wore different colored clothes also with gold embellishments. Raiment was similar for both men and women, with variations in wearing style. The Vasas, or lower garment, and the adhivasas, or upper garment, were the most common clothes worn by Rigvedic Aryans.'Nivi' (undergarment) was used in the later periods. The people also wore Atka' (a garment) and Drapi (a cloak). Female dancers wore an embroidered outfit. At the wedding ceremony, the bride wore a vadhuya.

Vadhuya is referred as a bridal garment in Rv. x. 85, 34; Av. xiv. 2, 41. Cf. Kausika Sutra, lxxix. 21; Asvalayana Grhya Sutra, i. 8, 12, etc.
