= Adivasah =

Overgarment

Adivasah (Adhīvāsah, Adhīvāsa, Adivasa) is an upper garment of Vedic times clothing; It is a type of over garment similar to a mantle or cloak. Vedas refers paridhāna (dress) as a set of clothes with these two main components where Vasa is for the lower body and Adivasa for the upper body.

== Name ==
Adivasah is a Sanskrit word (Adhīvāsah, Adhīvāsa, Uparistādāvarakam vāsah) which means a long coat.

== Use ==
Princes wore Adivasah. On special occasions, such as religious ceremonies, paridhāna was a must.paridhāna a set of Vasa (Vastra or Vasana) for the lower body, Adivasah as upper/over garment, Uttariya for the upper body. Most of these clothes were common for men and women with distinctive wearing and draping styles. The headdress then was called Usnisa or Usnisha. Vedic time Aryans were used to dress formally in these garments and sometimes embellished with gold. Later few more types of garments such as Atka, Drapi, and nivi were also used.

== See also ==
- Uttariya an upper body garment.
- Antariya a lower body garment.
- Kanchuka
- Vedas
- Tarpaya
- Vadhuya
