= Tarpaya =

Religious clothing in ancient India

Tarpaya (taipya or tarpya) was a fine material used in clothing for religious rituals in ancient India.

Tarpaya was a fine-quality cloth that was also used in sacrificial rituals and on other occasions. The names of various cloths such as "kshauma", "panduvanik", "varasi", "durshya" and "tarpya" exist in Vedic literature and may refer to either silk or linen. It is mentioned in the Atharvaveda which says "city people wear clothes made of tarpya."

Shatapatha Brahmanas described various articles of sacrificial costume, in which tarpaya is mentioned as a lower body garment. According to the Sathapatha Brahmanas, the sacrificial garment consisted of an upper body garment made of pure undyed wool, a lower garment of silk called "tarpaya", and a turban (ushnisha).
