= Uttariya =

Upper body garment of Vedic period

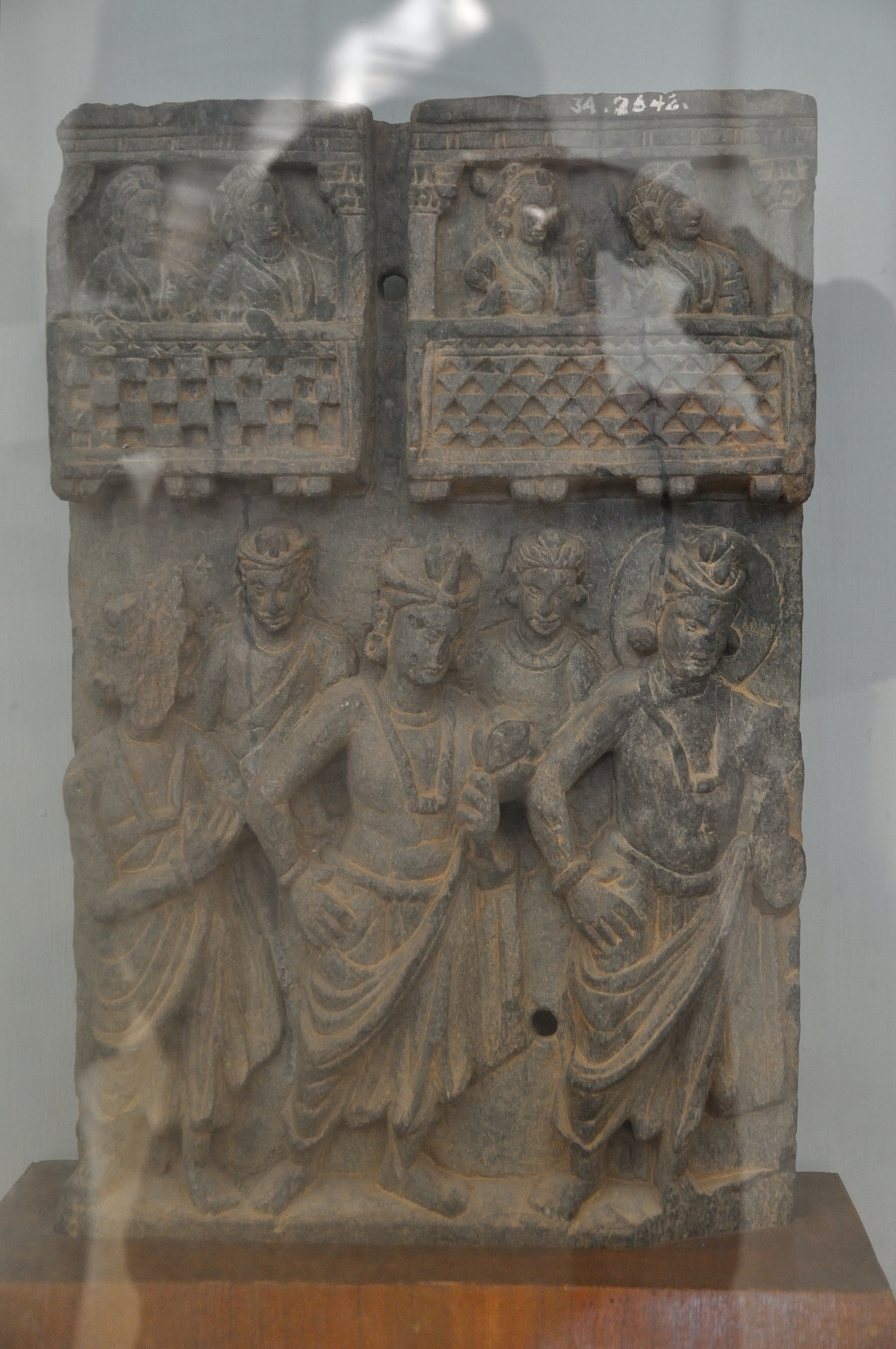
Relief depicting men wearing an antariya and an uttariya, 1st century CE.

An uttariya (uttarīya) is a loose piece of upper body clothing with its origins in ancient India. It is a single piece of cloth that falls from the back of the neck to curl around both arms and could also drape the top half of the body. An uttariya is similar to a veil, a long scarf and shawl. The Vedas describe the garment to comprise various loose cloths worn for upper body such as upavasana, parayanahana and adhivasa, varhatika and varnaka, uttarsangha samvyana.

== Etymology ==
The word uttarīya is from Sanskrit. It is a compound word, consisting of the words uttara (उत्तर) and suffix īya (ईय).

== History ==
The uttariya was a garment for the upper body in Vedic period (1500 and 500 BCE). The garments worn in the Vedic period mainly included a single cloth wrapped around the whole body and draped over the shoulder. People used to wear the lower garment called paridhana which was pleated in front and used to tie with a belt called mekhala and an upper garment called the uttariya (covered like a shawl) which they used to remove during summers. "Orthodox males and females usually wore the uttariya by throwing it over the left shoulder only, in the style called upavita". There was another garment called pravara that they used to wear in cold. This was the general garb of both the sexes but the difference existed only in size of cloth and manner of wearing. Sometimes the poor people used to wear the lower garment as a loincloth only while the wealthy would wear it extending to the feet as a sign of prestige.

The Mahabharata (compiled between 4th BC 4th CE) refers the use of the uttariya as a garment. The colors of the uttariya were associated with distinct varna in society then. The Pandavas were observed wearing white.

Women were using two uttariya sometimes, viz. for covering the chest, when a woman used satanmasuska or Sattanapatta (also known as kurpsika or kanchuki) to cover her breasts. As per mention in Buddhist Pali literature during the 6th century BC, Sari śāṭikā (Sanskrit: शाटिका) is an evolved form of combining Sattanapatta, the uttariya and the antariya.

It was usually made of fine cotton or silk, but can be suggested also with fine hide.

Carvings that feature this garment date back a long way but there are few examples of this garment surviving so fashion historians study the reliefs.

== Contemporary use ==
=== Rituals in Hindu temples ===
Priests in Hindu temples adorn the murti of a temple's deity with an uttariya, employed for the upper body, while the deity's lower body is dressed with a tadapa.

=== Buddhist clothing ===
Laymen of the Buddhist community would typically be dressed with the antariya, accompanied by an uttariya and a larger chadder, all colored in saffron.

=== Daily use ===
The uttariya is still worn throughout Indian subcontinent and is traditionally worn over kurta, achkan, or a sherwani. It was usually used in combination with the antariya, an ancient version of the dhoti, held with a sash or a cummerbund. The uttariya is also used as a dupatta, turban, by both men and women.

== See also ==
- Antariya
- Adivasah
- History of clothing in the Indian subcontinent
- Pratidhi
- Sari
- Stanapatta
- Nivi (garment)
