= Antariya =

Ancient Indian lower body garment

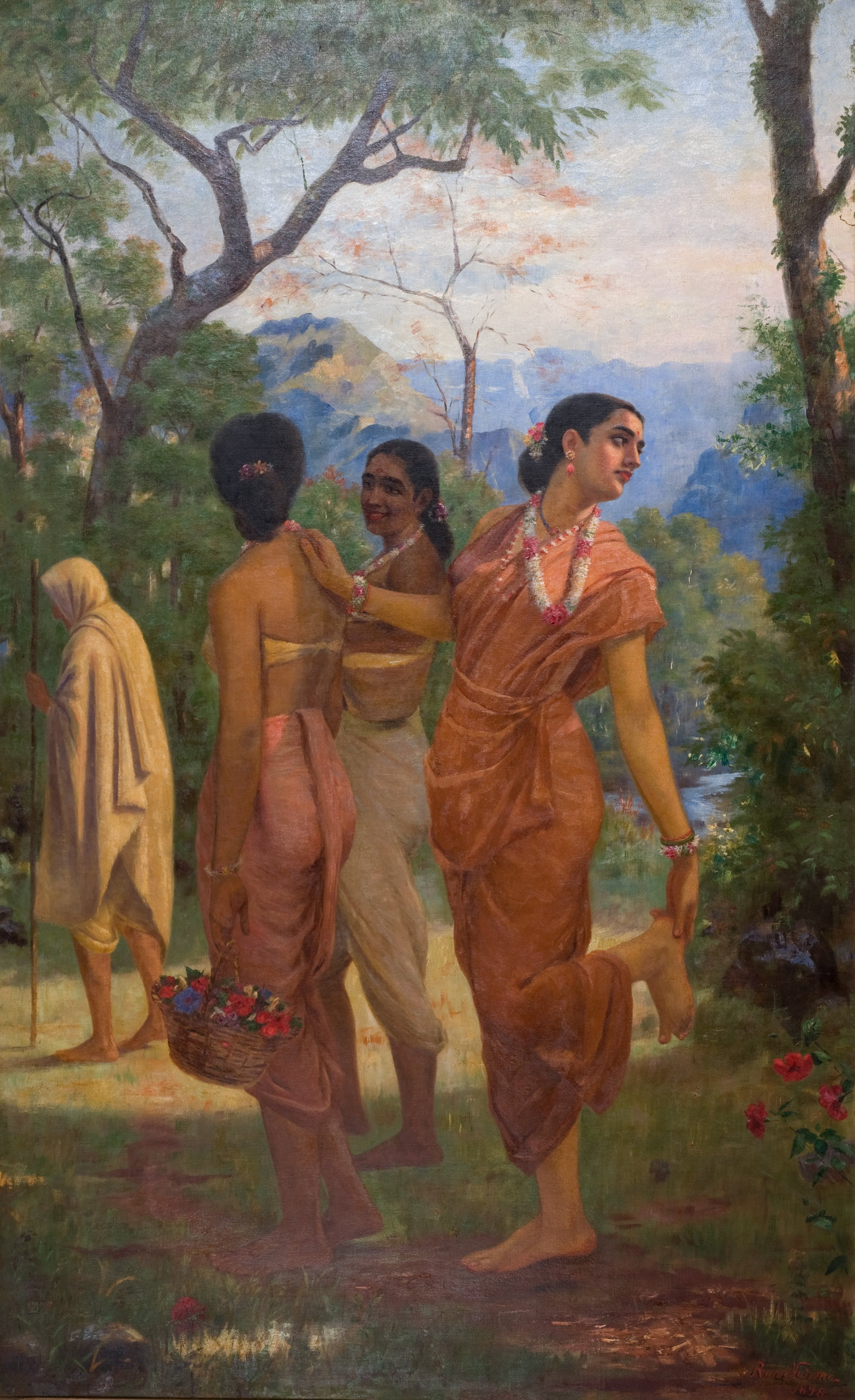
Painting of Shakuntala and her friends wearing an antariya, Raja Ravi Varma.

An Antariya (antarīya) is a lower body garment from ancient India. It is a long white or coloured strip of cotton passed through the legs, tucked at the back and covering the legs loosely, then flowing into long pleats at front of the legs.

== History ==
The antariya is an ancient garment mentioned in the Ramayana and the Mahabharata. Hindu deities can be seen wearing the uttariya and the antariya in sculptures in the Indian subcontinent, especially in Hindu temples and other forms of iconography.

As mentioned in Buddhist Pali literature during the 6th century BC, Sari śāṭikā (Sanskrit: शाटिका) is an evolved form of the antariya, which was one of three-piece attire worn by women during the ancient period.

== Etymology ==
The word antarīya is from Sanskrit. It is a compound word, consisting of the words antara (उत्तर) and suffix īya (ईय)..

== Use ==
The antariya was usually made of fine cotton or silk. It was usually used in combination with the uttariya.

== Gallery ==
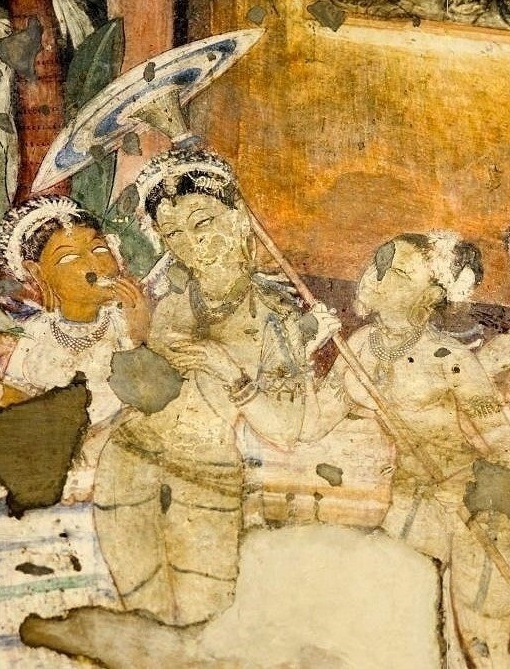
Women in choli (blouse) and antariya c. 320 CE, Gupta Empire

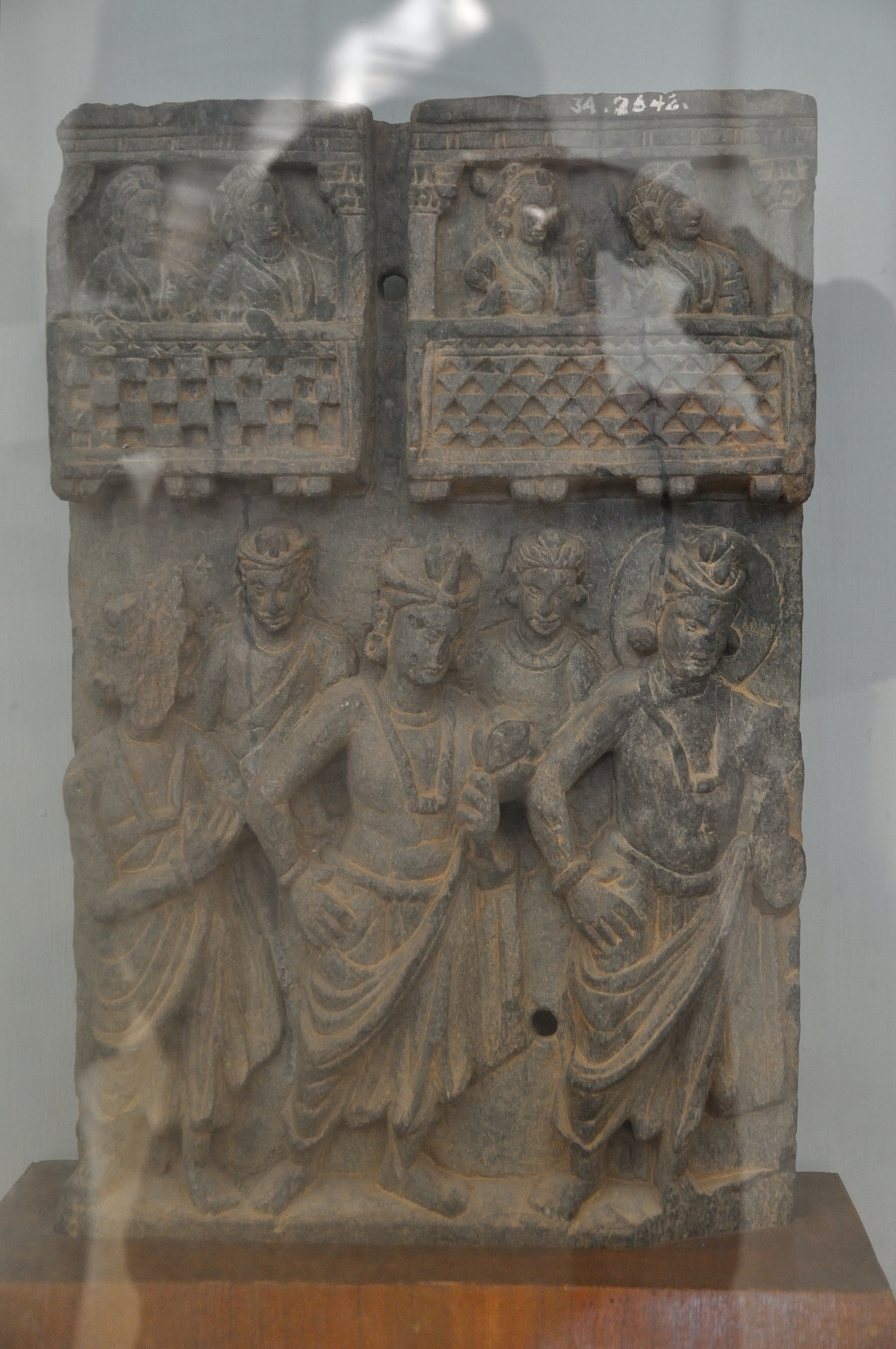
Relief depicting men in antariya and uttariya, 1st century CE

== See also ==
- Aprapadina
- Uttariya
- Sari
- Choli
- Nivi (garment)
