= Attire of Mangalorean Catholics =

Type of traditional clothing

Attire of Mangalorean Catholics refers to the ethnic wear of Mangalorean Catholic Christians from the Mangalore Diocese & the erstwhile South Canara district, by the southern coast of Carnataca, India.

== Costumes ==
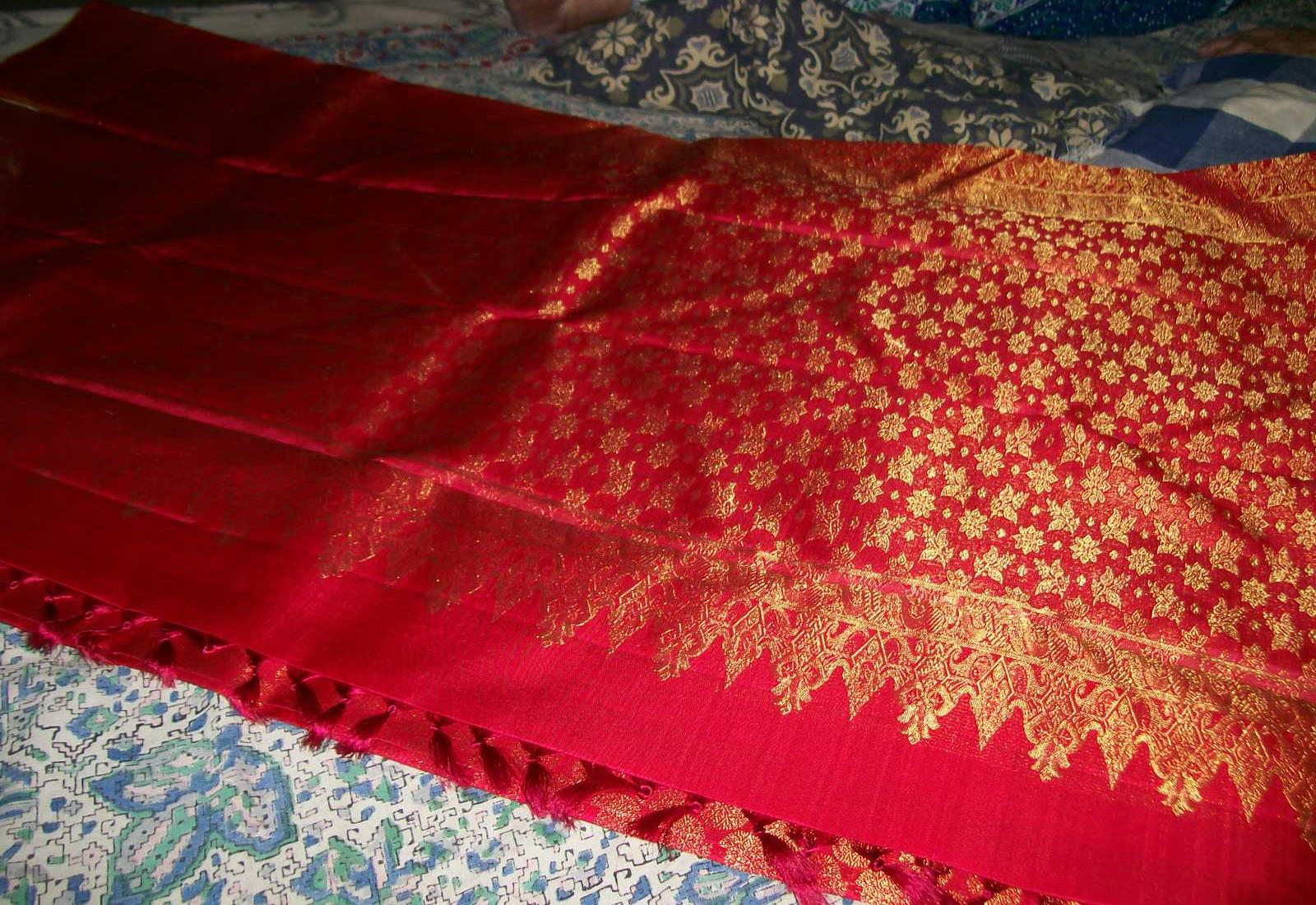
A typical Mangalorean Catholic wedding sari (sado)

Mangalorean Catholic men used to wear white or black coats known as kutav with buttons (a waist length coat similar to bandhgalas), while pudvem (dhoti), a piece of unstitched cloth, usually around 4 yards long, was wrapped around the waist, and in between the legs to be knotted at the waist. The turbans were usually flattened like the Coorgi turbans (mundaas or urmal). The mundaas or urmal or is a long white piece of cloth with a golden hem (todop) and is tied around the head like a turban in a peculiar manner by which they could easily be recognized as Catholic Christians. By the 20th century, the traditional dress was worn on church-going occasions by a small number of elderly men.

Before marriage, women used to wear a kirgi (similar to half saree) and baju (kurti). The kirgi is a piece of cloth, not longer than four feet and about three feet broad. It was wrapped around the body from the waist down. A jacket called baju with long sleeves was used to cover the upper part of the body. This dress was a sign of her virginity and she wore for the last time during the Ros ceremony. The kirgi was wrapped around the waist, but the end of the sari is not thrown over the shoulder. To wear the full sari with its end thrown over the shoulder, known as worl, was the exclusive right of a married woman. Married women used to wear sarees the general way.

The Mangalorean Catholic bride's wedding sari (drape) is known as sado. It is usually a red coloured Benaresi sari, made of finely woven silk, decorated with elaborate gold embroidery called zàri (brocade). In olden days, the bride wore on her head a red cloth, three feet long and as many broad. After the wedding was over, the Sado was well preserved and worn only on feast-days or for weddings and any other grand functions. Sometimes a particularly precious sado was handed down from mother to daughter and considered a valuable heirloom. The cost of a sado was reckoned in varahas. Saris are known for their variety by special names, such as katari, shilari, gulabi, etc. Both the sado and Dharma sado were costly saris, while the sado was the most expensive, the Dharma Sado was the second most expensive. Some Mangalorean Catholic brides also used to wear a white sari, to the nuptial blessing in church, however this style of dress has waned in the recent years.

The bridegroom's attire in the early times consisted of a cloth wrap (dhoti), a shawl to cover his shoulders and a red handkerchief on the head (leis). The groom's dress was gradually improved. Later, his dress consisted of a yellow or white dhoti, with a red and gold hem (todop) and a short coat (kutav) with gold buttons and a towel (urmal) on the head. The bridegroom wore a chakrasar (neck chain) around his neck. He wore a pair of sandals or at least a pair of socks. In present times, many Mangalorean Catholic couples and particularly the diaspora outside South Canara, have taken to Victorian style white weddings, in which the bridegroom usually wears a two-piece black tie suit, while the bride wears a white wedding gown to the Church ceremony, Nevertheless, since the 1960s, some families have adopted and preserved wedding customs and norms of their Konkani ethnicity, and follow the ethnic Konkanite rituals to varying degrees. Some brides still choose to wear the sado at the reception, while the pudvem (foot length dhoti) and kutav (short coat) has been abandoned by most grooms, in favour of the North Indian-Moghal era sherwani.

Eastern wear today comprises pudvem (a light coloured silk dhoti) that is usually off-white or whitish yellow, and a dark coloured bandgala for the groom. While the bride wears a sado (red sari) with a full-length bodice or blouse (choli or kurti top), this is followed by a number of native Konkani (paik) rituals, the most prominent among which is the tying of pirduk, a hybridised piece of jewellery drawing from thaali (bridal necklace) and a Christian pendant, blest by a priest during the church wedding ceremony.

The Punjabi salwar kameez sets and Keralite shirt-mundu sets, are another form of popular dress, among contemporary females & males.

== Notes ==
a The Hindus call it mangalsutra or mangala sutra (the auspicious necklace). It is the symbol of the married state.
b This was probably imported from Kerala where the thali is the symbol of the married state. The bridegroom has to tie it around the neck of the bride during the wedding.
c Some fifty years ago the old women still wore black glass bangles and even copper bangles. The Vakkal women wear bangles of black glass on both arms even at the present time.
