= Saraiki shalwar suits =

Traditional Pakistani dress

There are two types of Saraiki shalwar suits which originate in the southern area of Punjab, Pakistan. These are the Bahawalpuri shalwar suit and the Multani shalwar suit. The two main suits from that area.

== Bahawalpuri shalwar suit ==
The Bahawalpuri shalwar originates from the Bahawalpur region of Punjab, Pakistan. The Bahawalpuri shalwar is wide and baggy with voluminous folds.

The Bahawalpuri shalwar was worn by the men of the royal family of Bahawalpur. The royal men wore shalwar with coats, made of silk, embroidered in golden patterns. The material traditionally used for the Bahawalpuri shalwar and suthan is known as sufi which is a mixture of cotton warp mixed with silk weft and gold threads running down the material. The other name for these types of mixed cloth is shuja khani.

The Bahawalpuri shalwar is worn with the Bahawalpur style kameez, the Punjabi kurta or chola. The Bahawalpur kameez has local prints and embroidery patterns. Bandhani tye-dyeing is popular in the Cholistan Desert. In the early 20th century A.D. it was traditional for men to wear the angarkha on its own leaving the chest and abdomen exposed, which was locally known as the chola.

The headgear includes the turban for men and headscarf for women. In the past, large turbans were worn such as the type in Bahawalpur which could be up to 40 feet long. Now the turbans are shorter of various designs. Under the turban, it is traditional to wear a cap called a kolah. Men also traditionally throw a scarf over their shoulders which is embroidered on the borders.

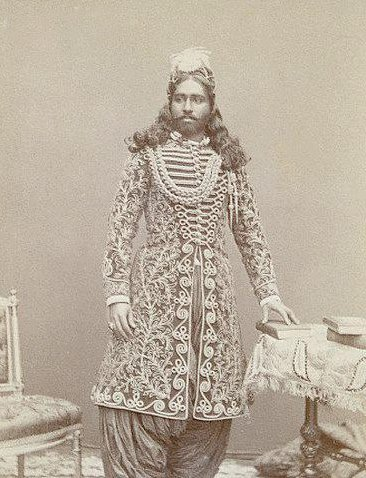
Nawab Muhammad Of Bahawalpur (1868-1900) wearing a loose Bahawalpuri shalwar

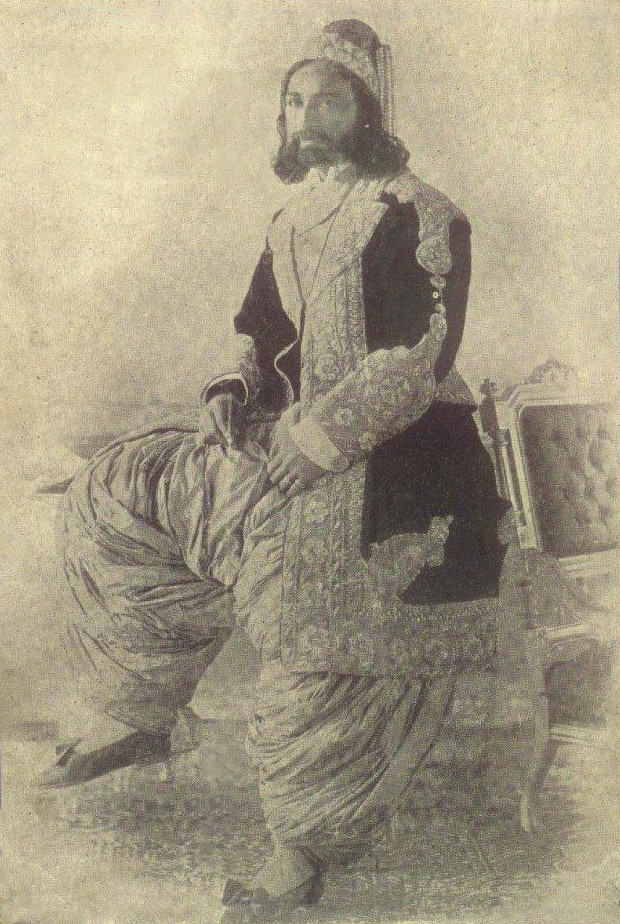
Prince Suba Sadiq Abbasi, Bahawalpur

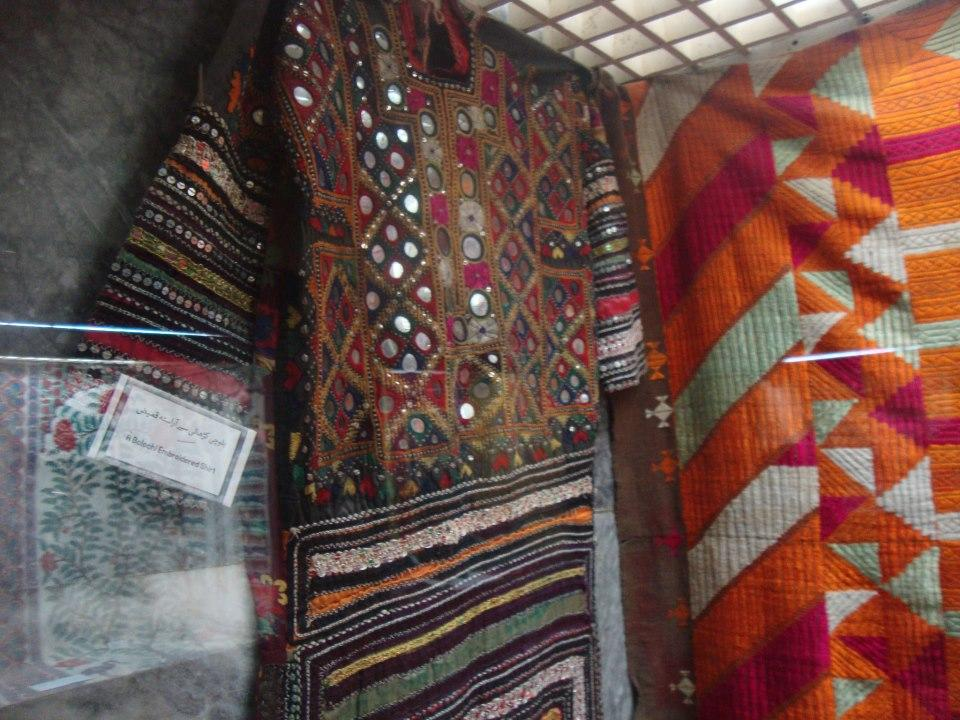
Bahawalpur kameez

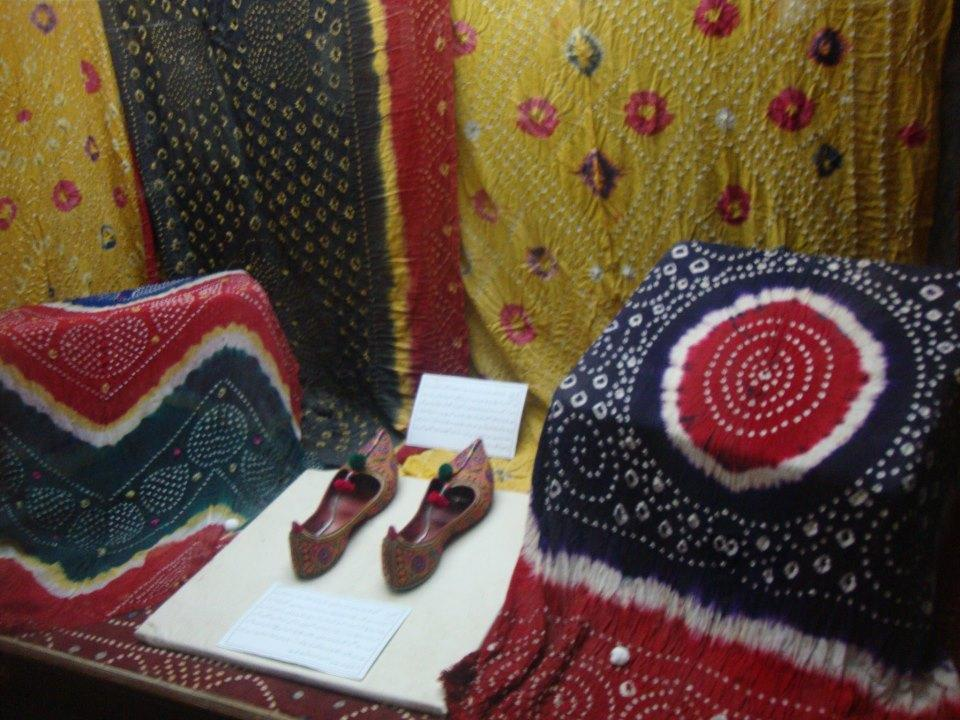
Rohi (Cholistan) woman's bandhani dress (Punjab, Pakistan)

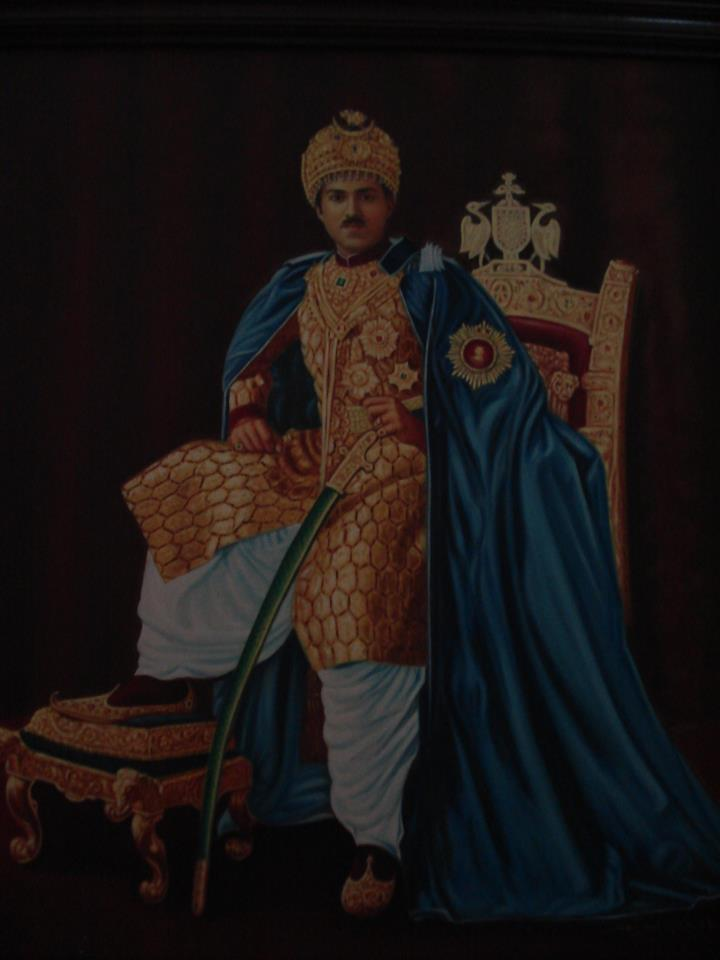
Nawab Sadiq Khan Fifth (died 1966) in the Bahawalpuri shalwar

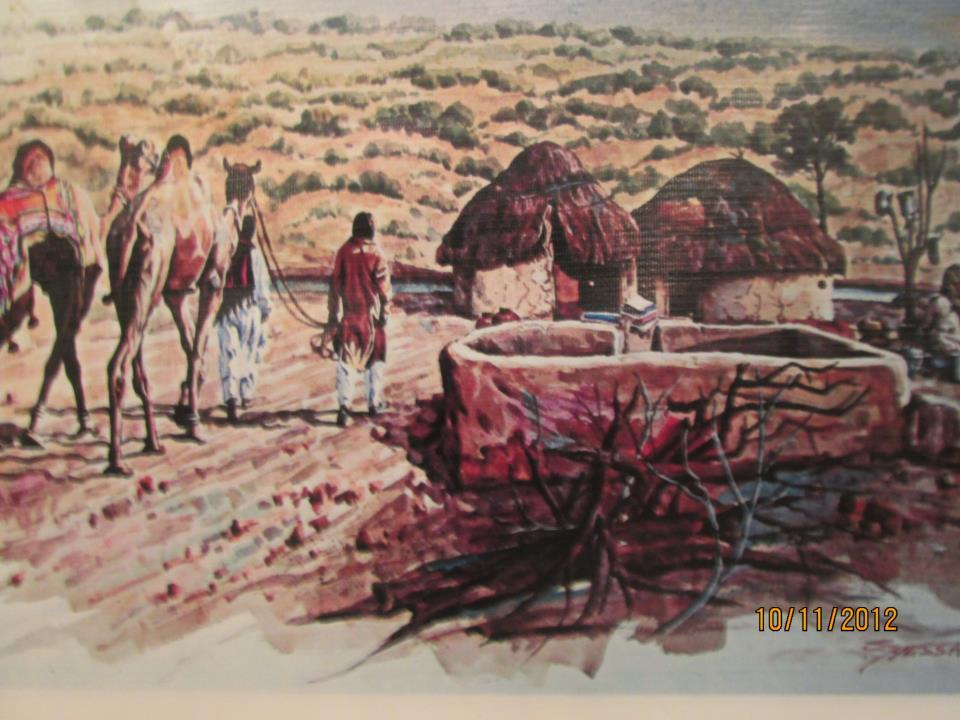
Saraiki Tradition Rohi

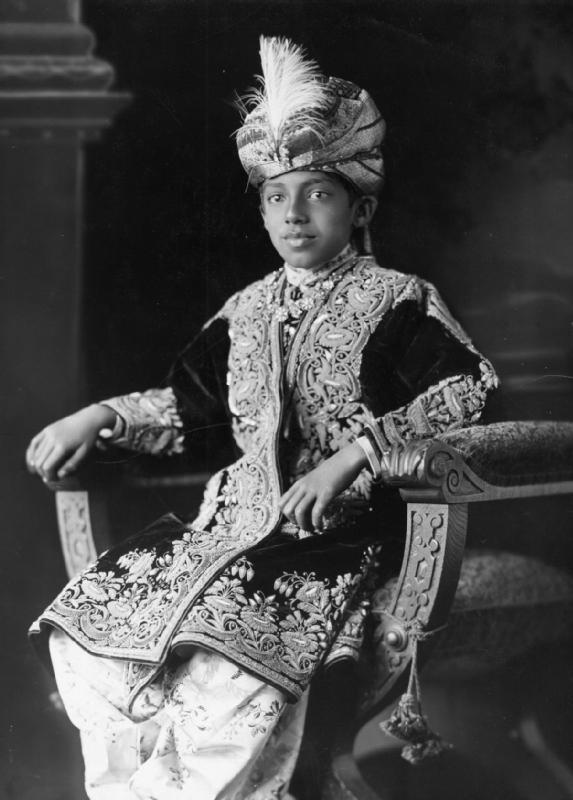
Sadeq Mohammad Khan in Bahawalpuri suit

== Multani shalwar suit ==
The Multani shalwar originates from the Multan area of the Punjab region. Accordingly, the style of the Multani shalwar is similar to the Sindhi kancha shalwar. The Multani shalwar is wide and baggy, and has folds like the Punjabi suthan. Further influence on the Multani shalwar came from Baloch migrants who arrived in Multan during the 15th century from Balochistan, Pakistan. However, the large Balochi shalwar was discarded by the migrants in favour of the local style.

The upper garments include the Punjabi kameez and the chola of the Punjab region. The local style of the Punjabi kurta is the Multani kurta which is crocheted using designs of Multan. Local Ajrak prints are also used as are prints known as chit Multani or Multani chint. Multan is also known for its tie-dyeing material. Multani embroidery includes kalabatun which features patterns using thin wires. The other name for the Multani kurta is the Saraiki kurta. Over the kurta or kameez, the kurti is also sometimes worn.

The Multani shalwar kameez when worn by men is accompanied by a turban known as a patka and/or a scarf draped over the shoulders. Women wear the outfit with a head scarf known as the bochan. The embroidered phulkari or chador is also used.

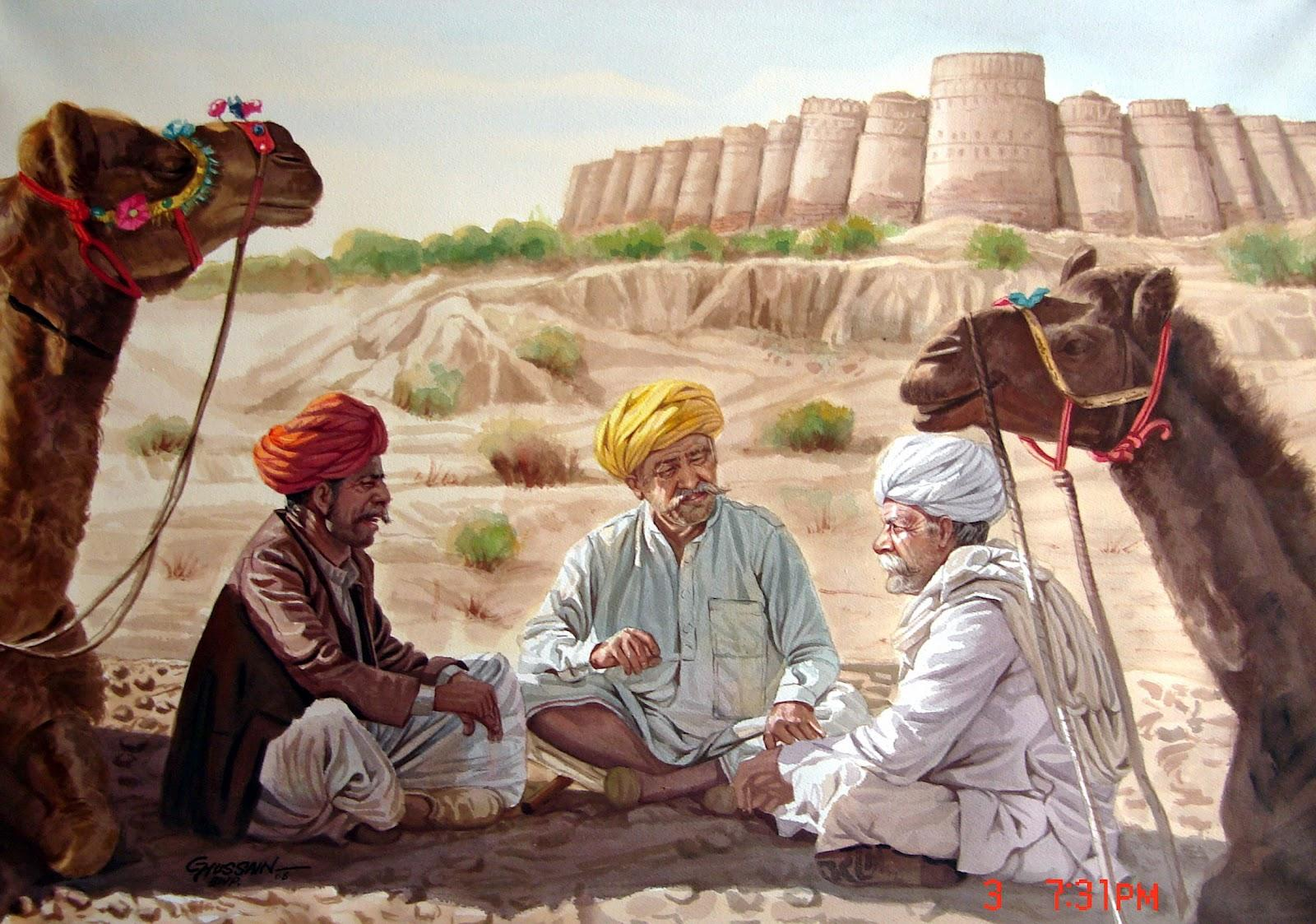
Saraiki dress

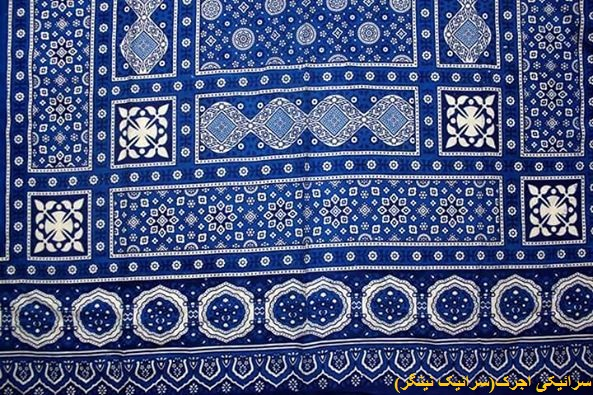
Saraiki Ajrak

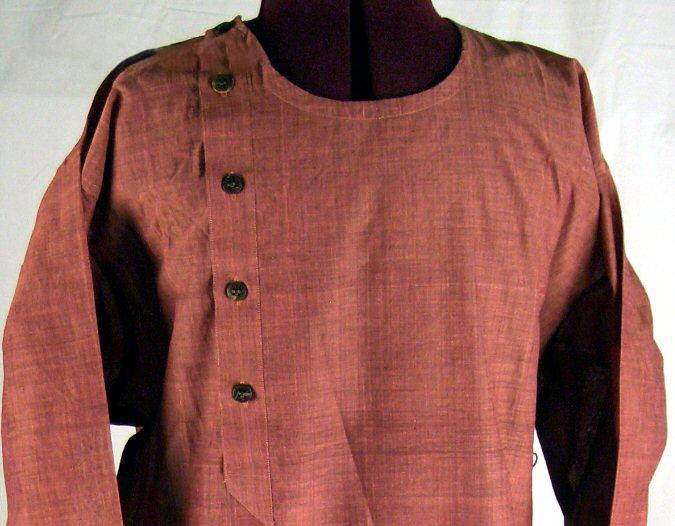
Saraiki kurta

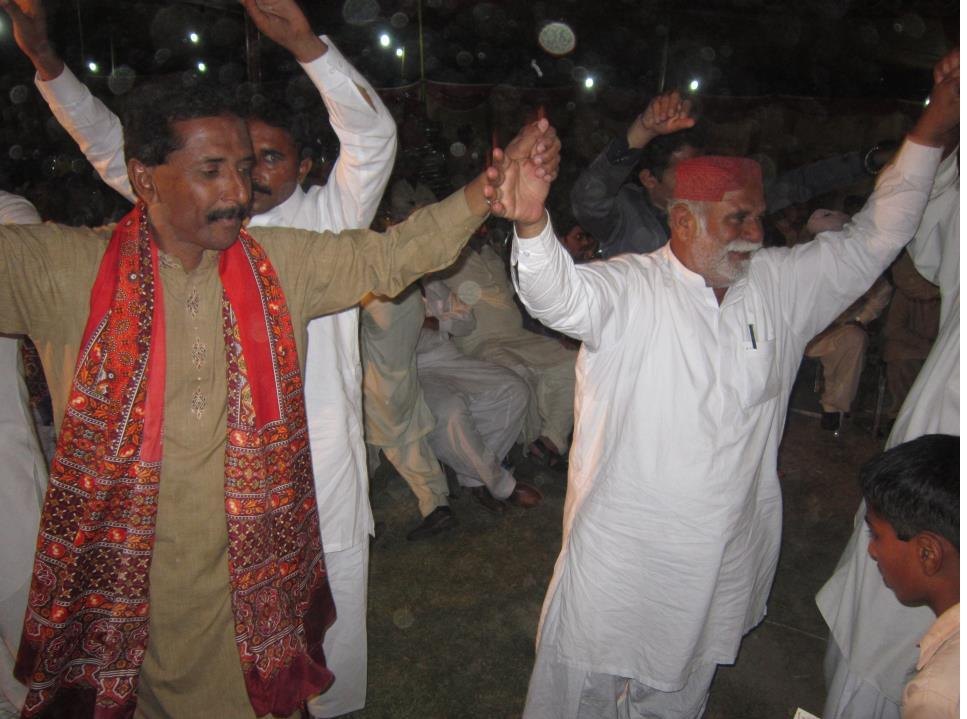
Saraiki Jhumar

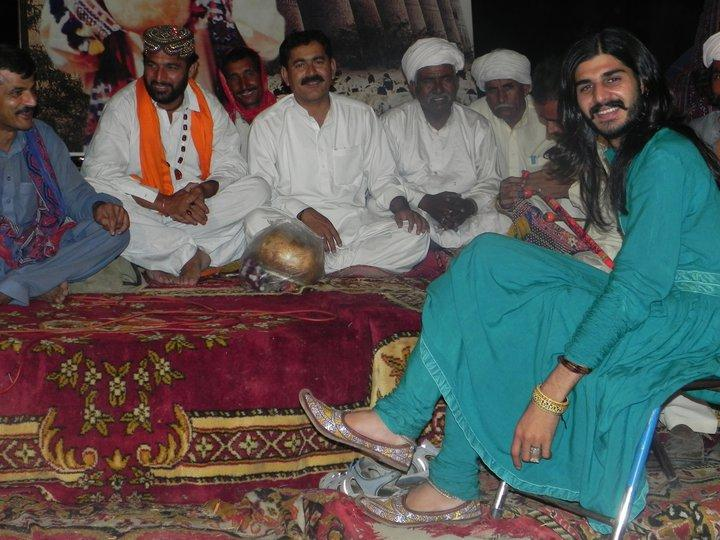
Saraiki chola (right)

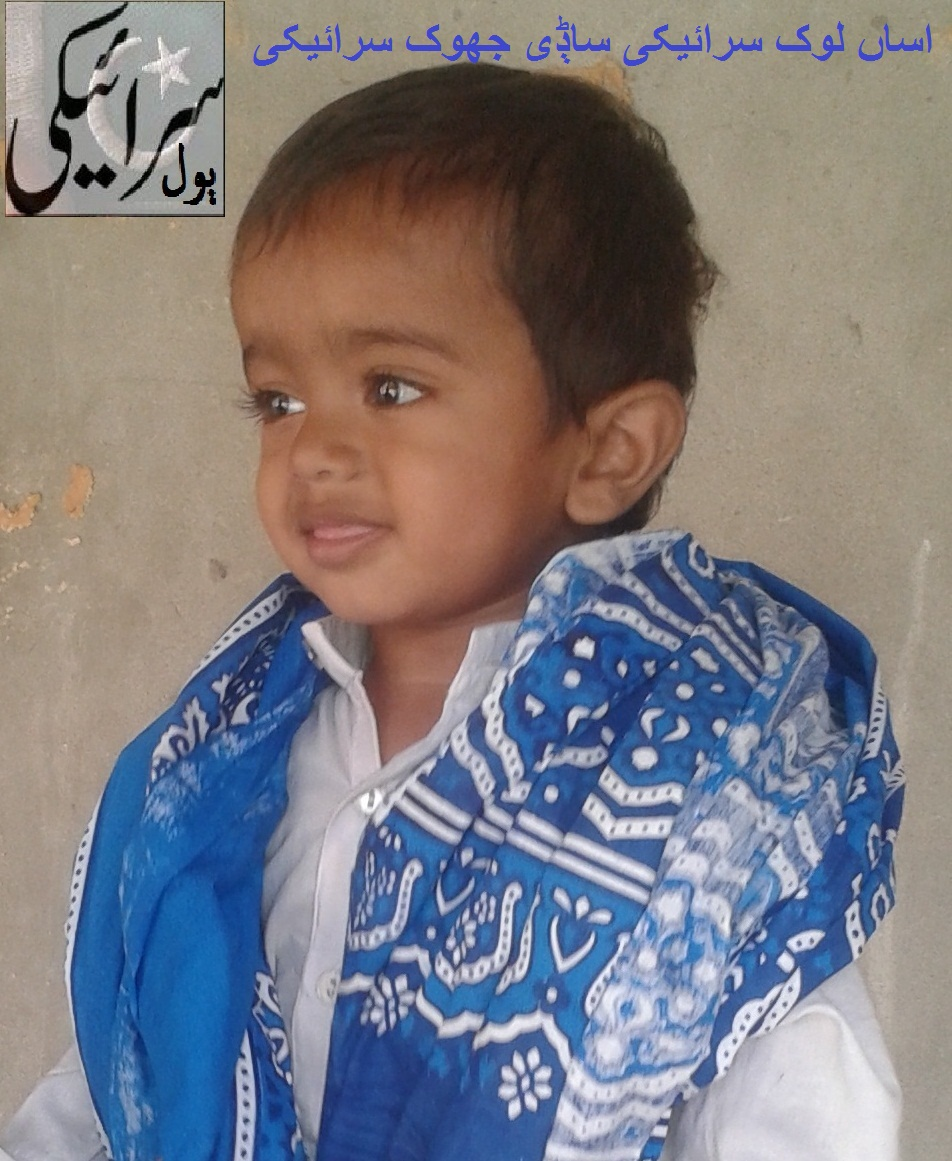
Saraiki Bool

== See also ==
- Salwar
