= Choli =

Type of crop top worn with the sari

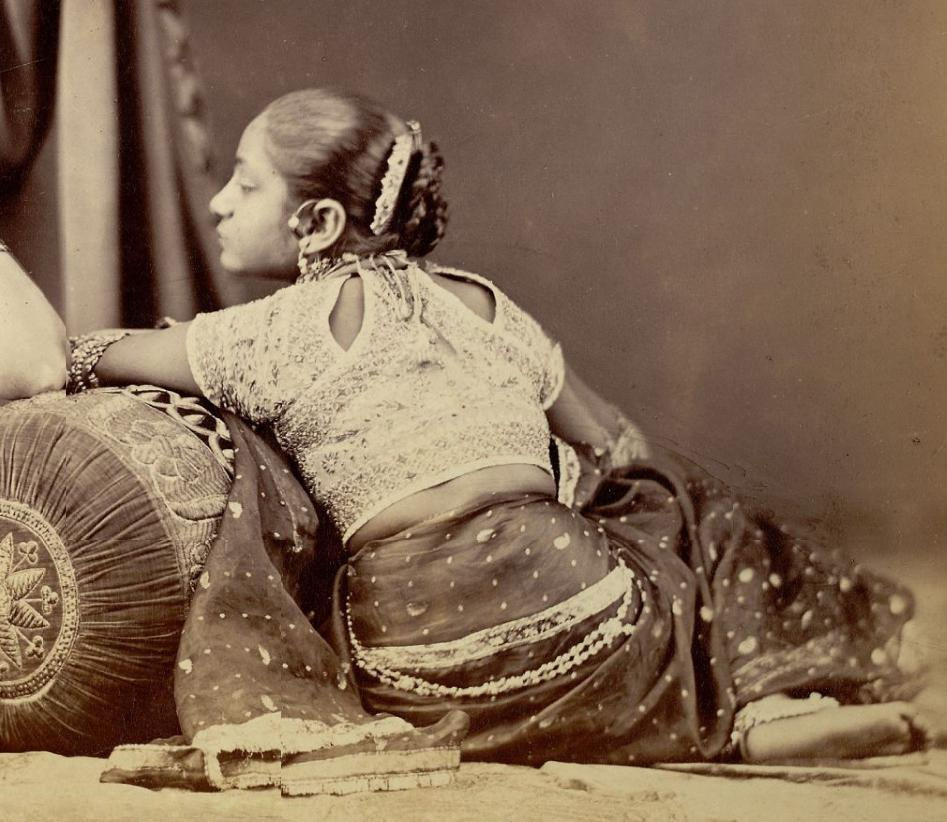
Woman in choli c. 1872.

A choli or ravike is a blouse or a bodice-like upper garment, that is usually cut short or cropped leaving the midriff bare worn by women in the Indian subcontinent. It is also known as ravike in South India. It is worn along with a sari in the Indian subcontinent. In northern Gujarat is also known as polku. The choli is also part of the ghagra choli costume in the Indian subcontinent. Some women in Rajasthan wore the kurti on top of their choli after marriage.

== Evolution ==
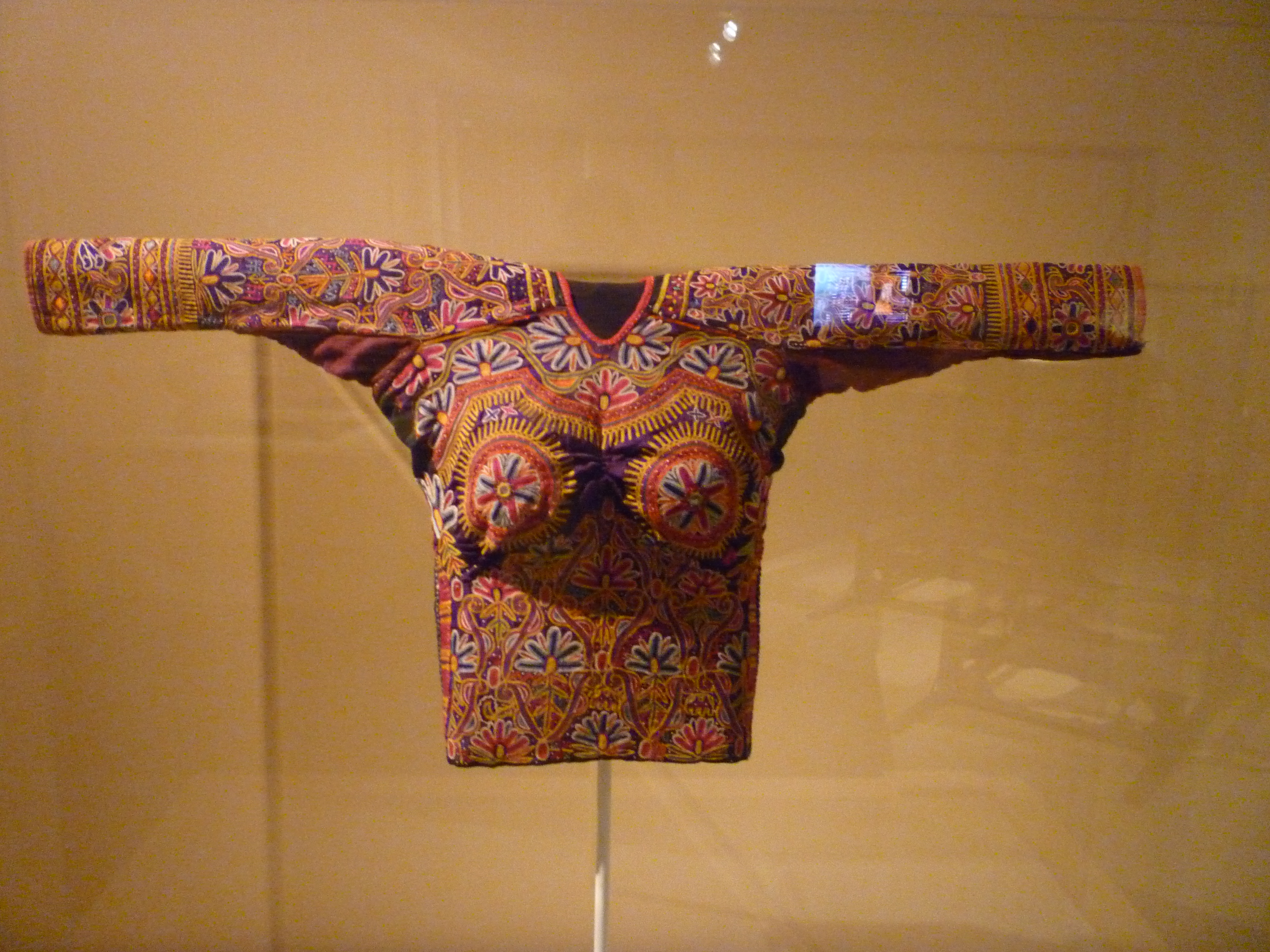
Choli from Gujarat at the Peabody Essex Museum.

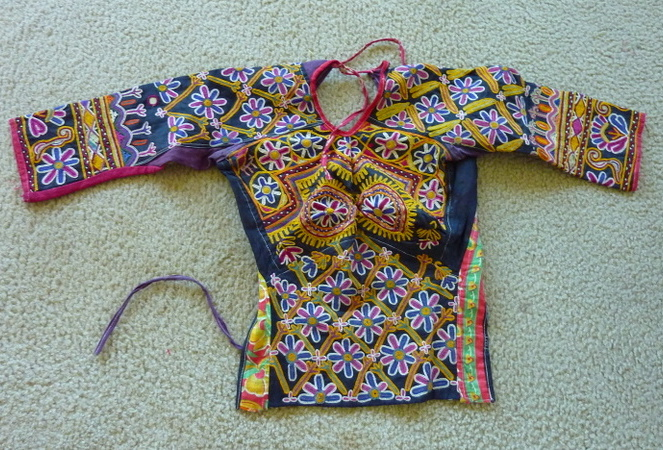

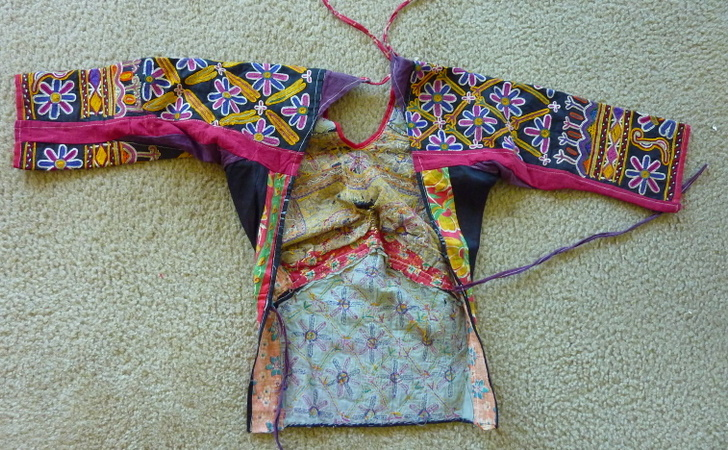
Traditional choli tied at the back from Braj region of Uttar Pradesh.

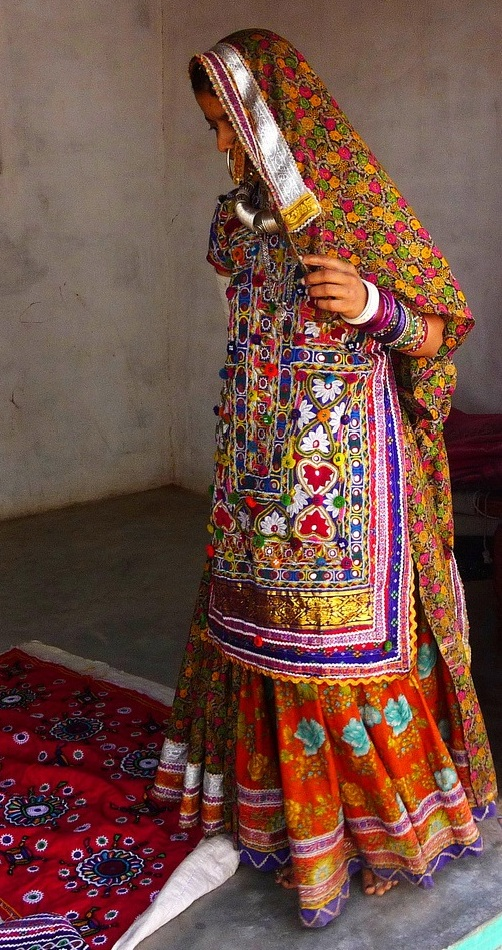
Woman in an ancient form of long, front-covering choli, tied at the back.

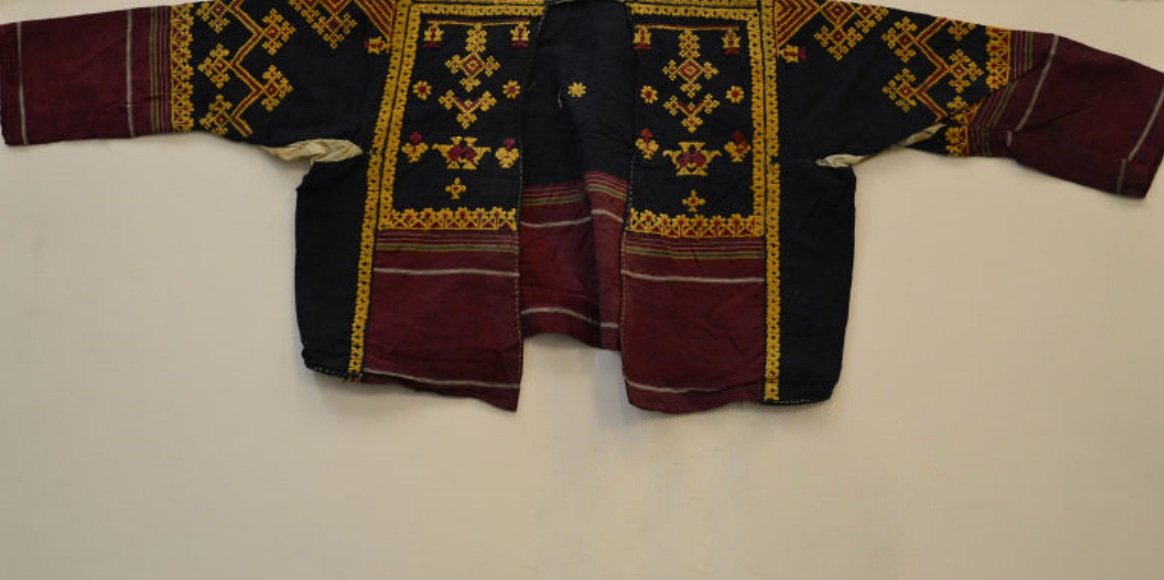
Ravike from Karnataka with Kasuti embroidery c. 1855–1879. V&A Museum.

The choli evolved from the ancient stanapatta, which was part of a three-piece attire worn by women during the ancient period. This consisted of the antriya lower garment; the uttariya veil worn over shoulder or head; and the stanapatta, a chest band, which is mentioned in Sanskrit literature and Buddhist Pali literature during the 6th century BC. The stiched bodic blouses called kanchuki, choli, angiya, kanchuliya, kurpsika emerged later evolving from stanapatta.

Paintings from Maharashtra from the first millennium BCE are considered the first recorded examples of the choli. Paintings and sculpture indicate that the stanapatta evolved into the choli by the first century CE, in various regional styles. Poetic references from works such as Silapadikkaram indicate that during the Sangam period (third-century BCE to fourth-century CE in ancient South India), a single piece of clothing served as both lower garment and upper shawl and by 7th century choli bodics are depicted on Kanchipuram murals.

Front-tied choli or rivake finds early mention in Gaha Sattasai text in the Deccan region in the 1st century CE. The Rajatarangini, a tenth-century literary work by Kalhana, states that the choli from the Deccan was introduced under the royal order in Kashmir.

Some early cholis were front-covering and tied at the back. Cholis of this kind are still common in state of Rajasthan. In Nepal, the garment is known as a cholo, and in Southern India as a ravike. Both of these styles are tied at the front, unlike Northern Indian cholis, which are tied at the back. In parts of the Hindi Belt, mostly in Rajasthan, Haryana and Uttar Pradesh, women wore vest-like garments, known as kanchli, over choli; this complete costume is known as the poshak.

=== Historical art ===
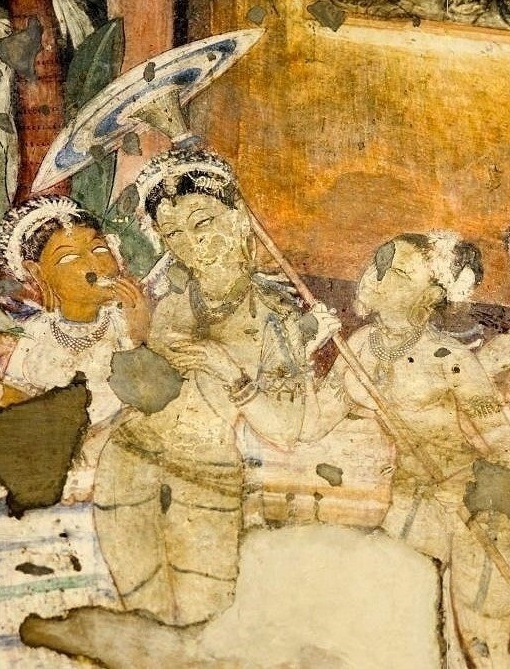
Women in Choli and Antariya CE 320 Gupta Empire.

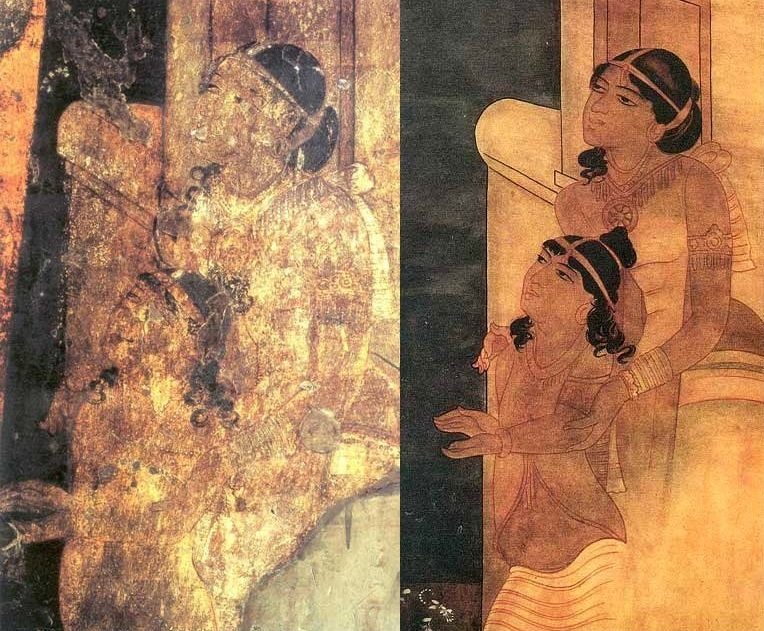
Women in Choli CE 320 Gupta Empire. The early form of Choli tied at the back with the front covering.

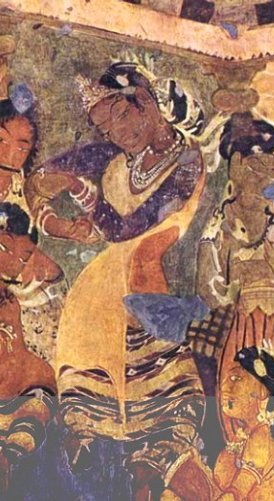
Dancing girl in Kurta/Salwar-like Choli Gupta Empire.

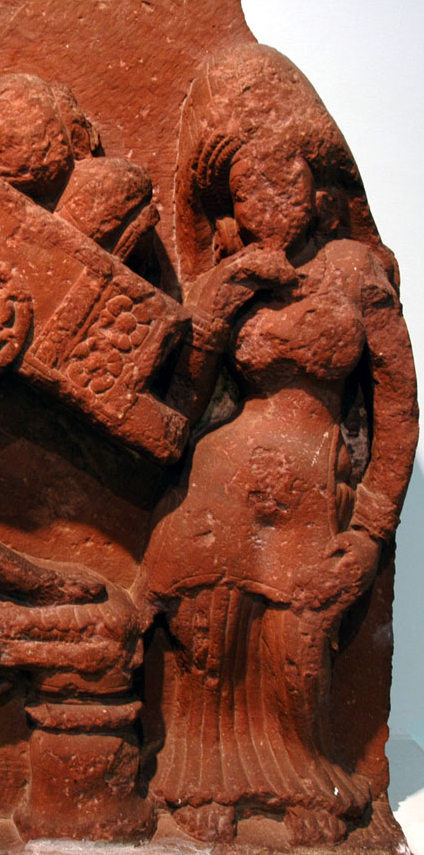
Plaque depicting ancient form of long choli and gagra worn during Gupta Empire

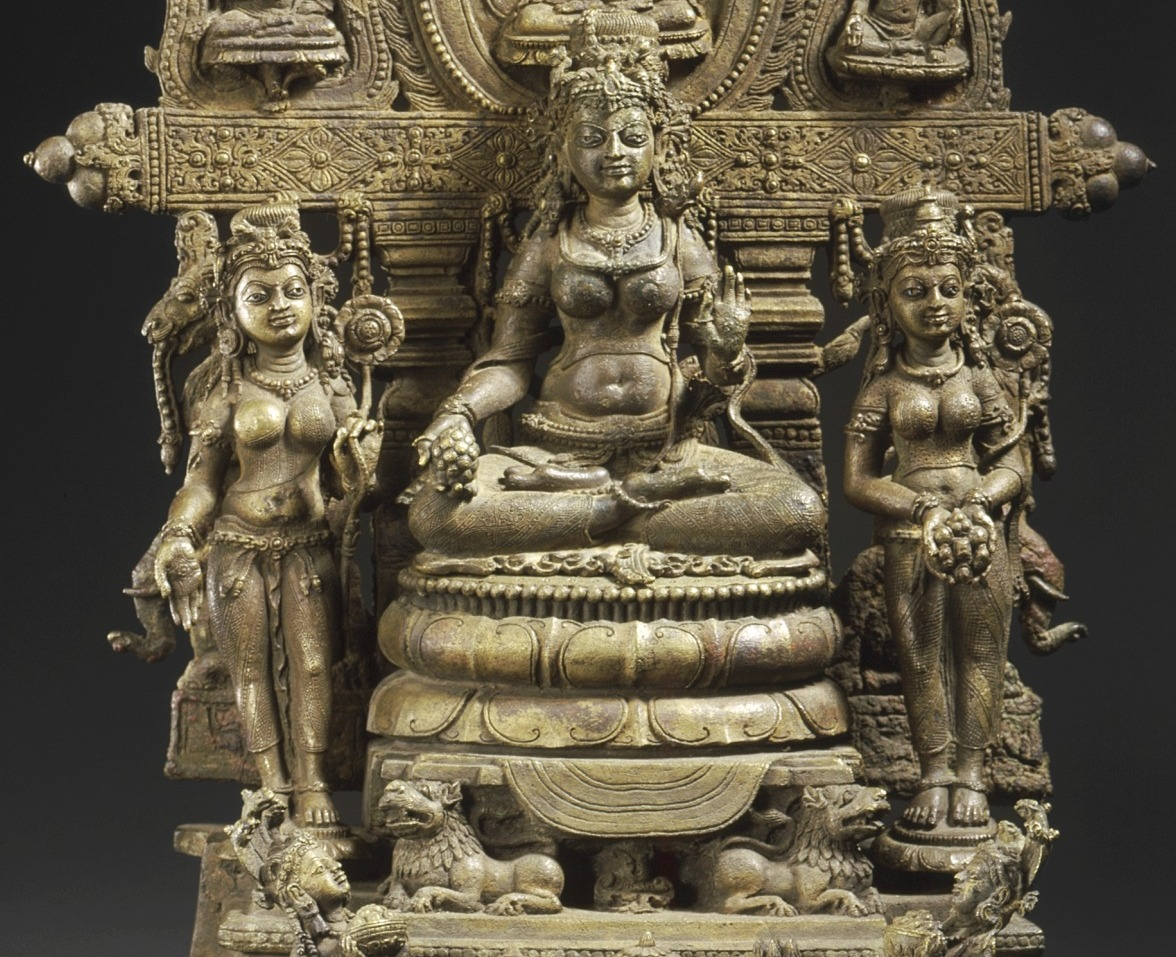
Choli garments, antariya and uttariya (veil), bronze, 8th century

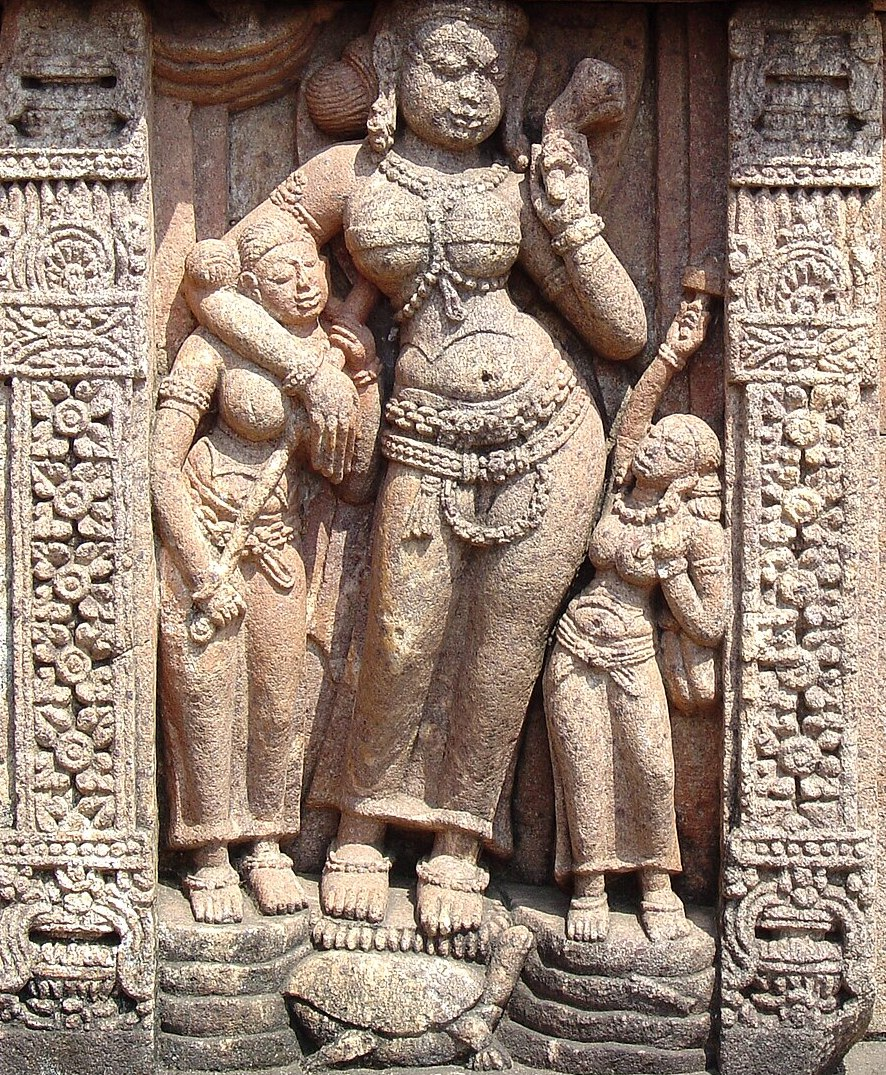
Choli, antariya, uttariya 7th-10th CE.

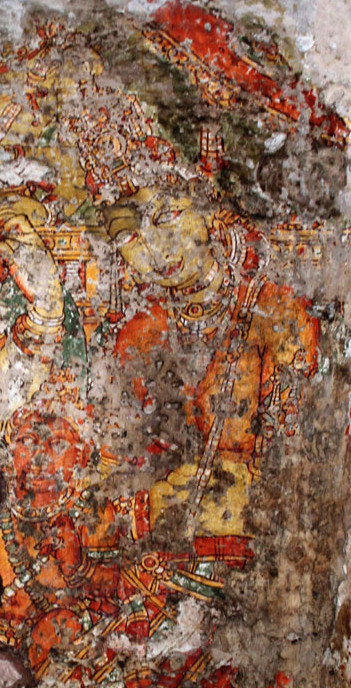
Choli or Rivke bodic, antariya, uttariya 7th century CE.

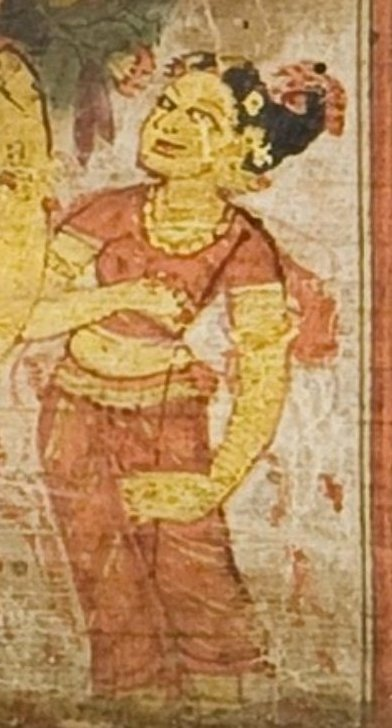
Choli, antariya, uttariya fragmented palm-leaf manuscript, 10th century CE

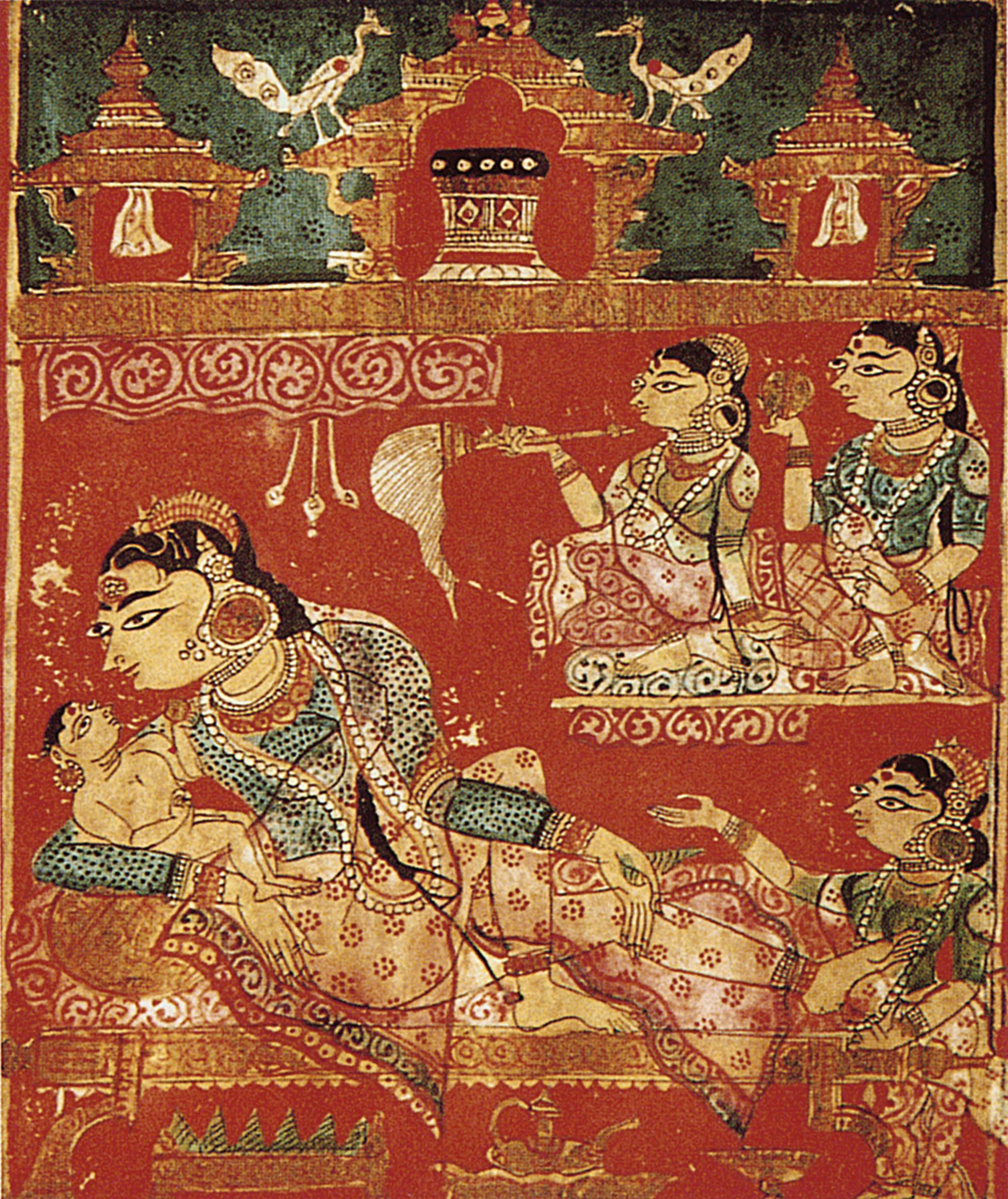
Kalpasutra Manuscript c. 1375–1400. Example of early form of full sleeve choli.

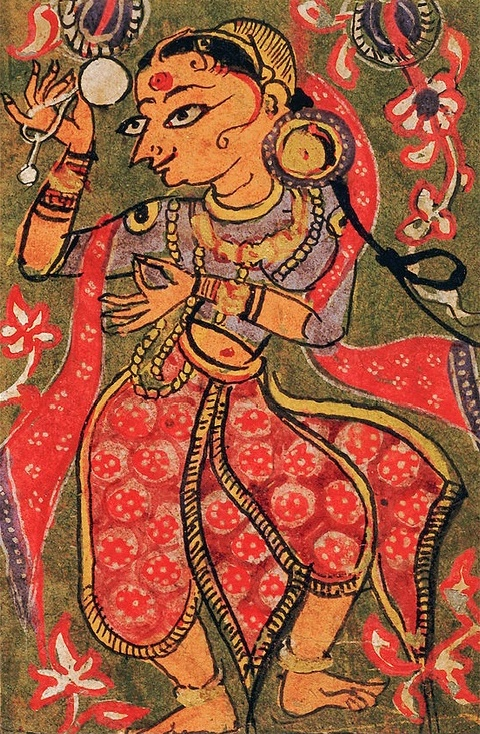
Woman dressed in choli, antariya and uttariya (veil), ca. 1375–1400

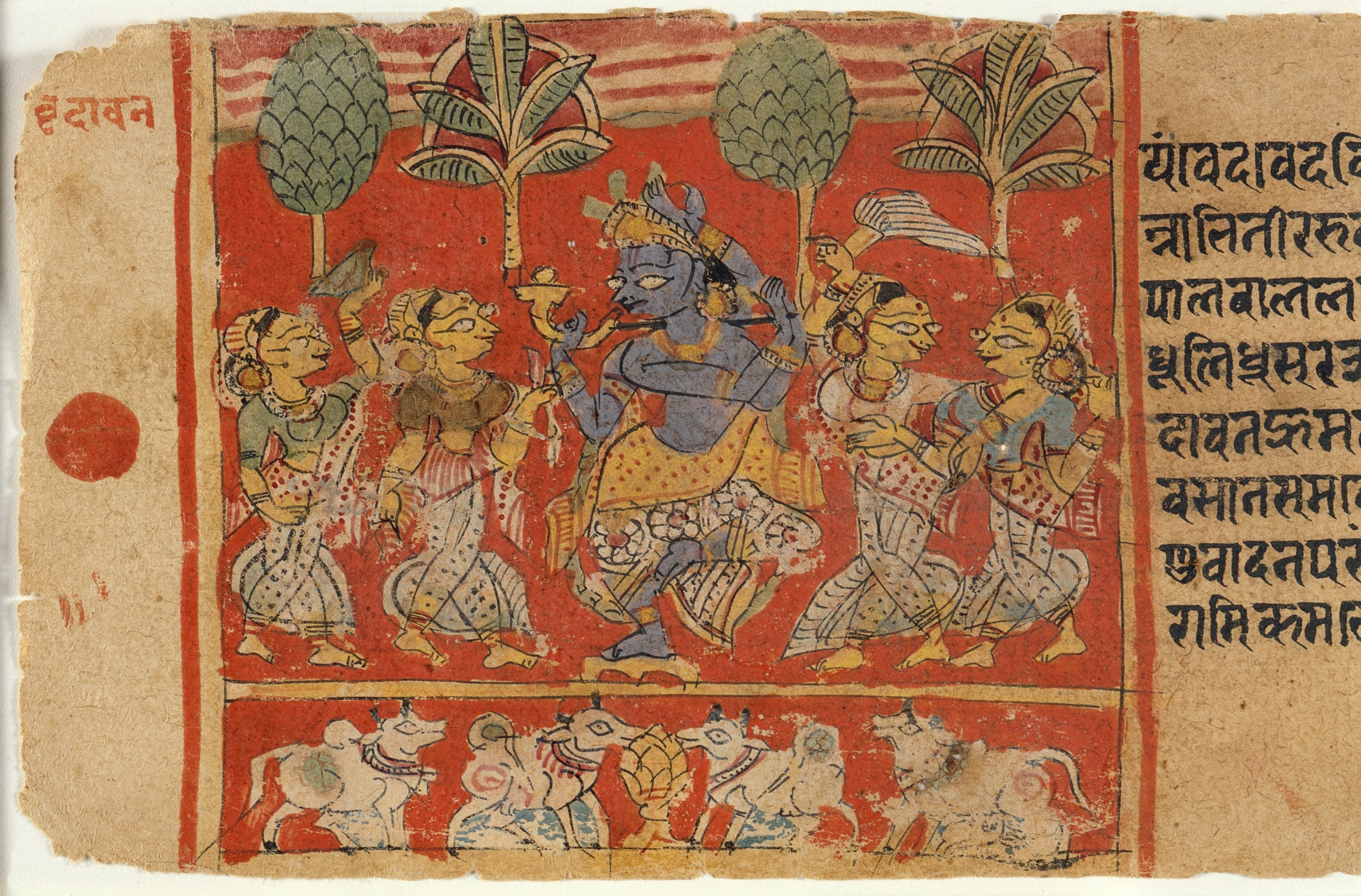
Manuscript folio, ca. 1450–1475

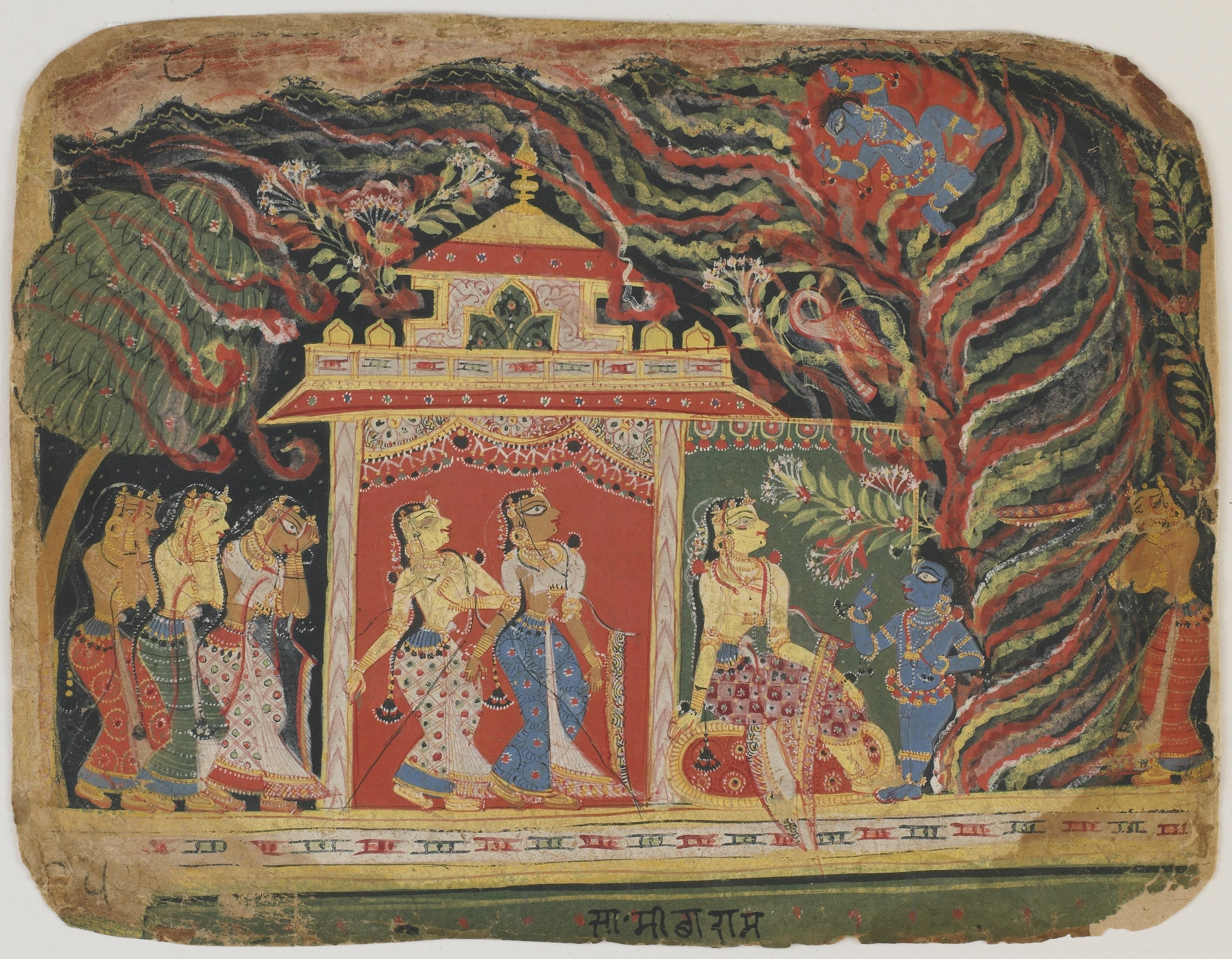
Bhagavata Purana manuscript c. 1525–40

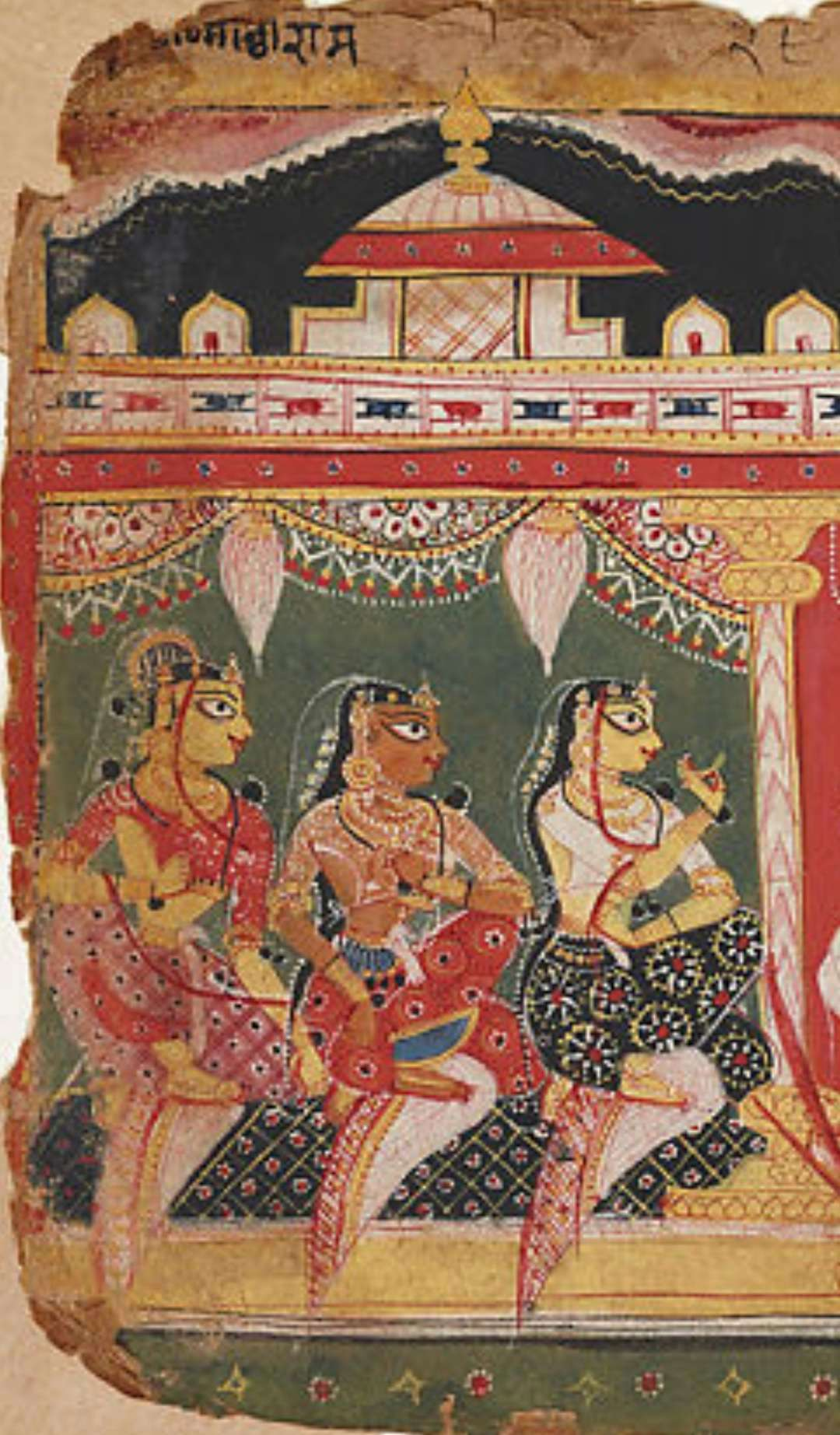
Bhagavata Purana manuscript c. 1525–40

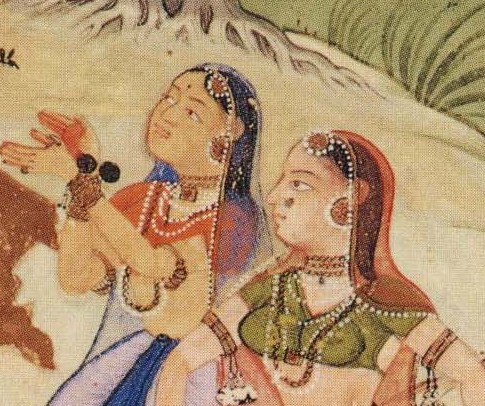
Detail of Vasant Ragini, Rajastani painting 1500s showing early form of choli tied at the back.

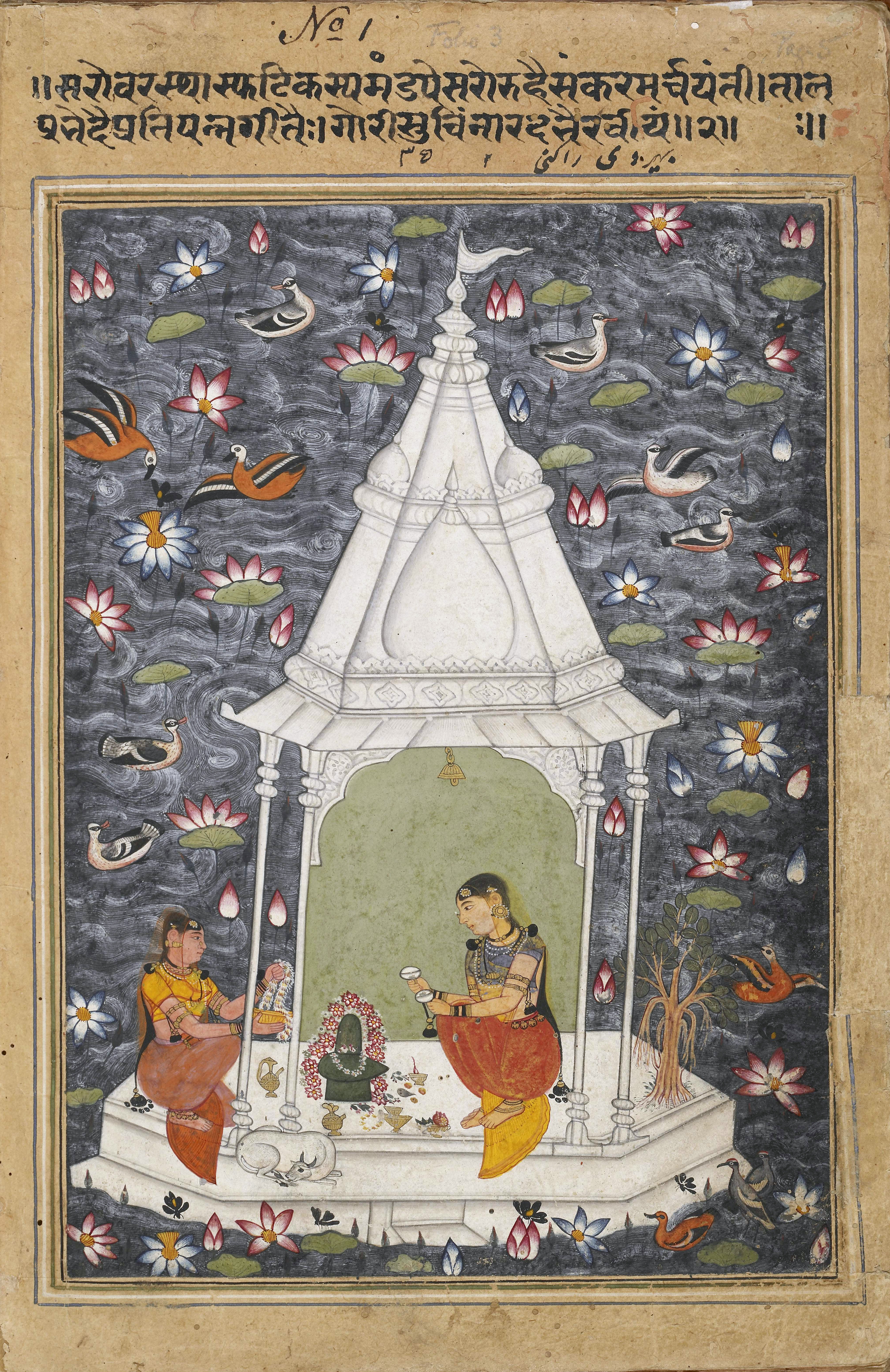
Bhairavi Ragini, Manley Ragamala manuscript c. 1610.

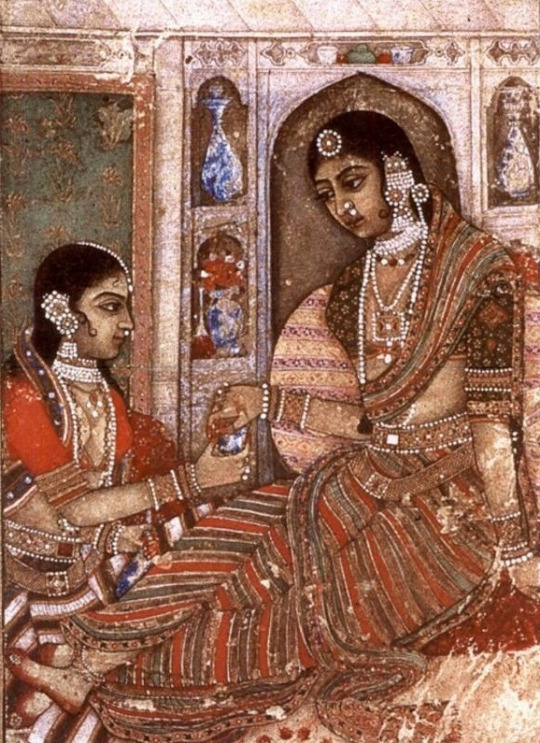
Lady being offered wine, Deccan, 1600 CE.

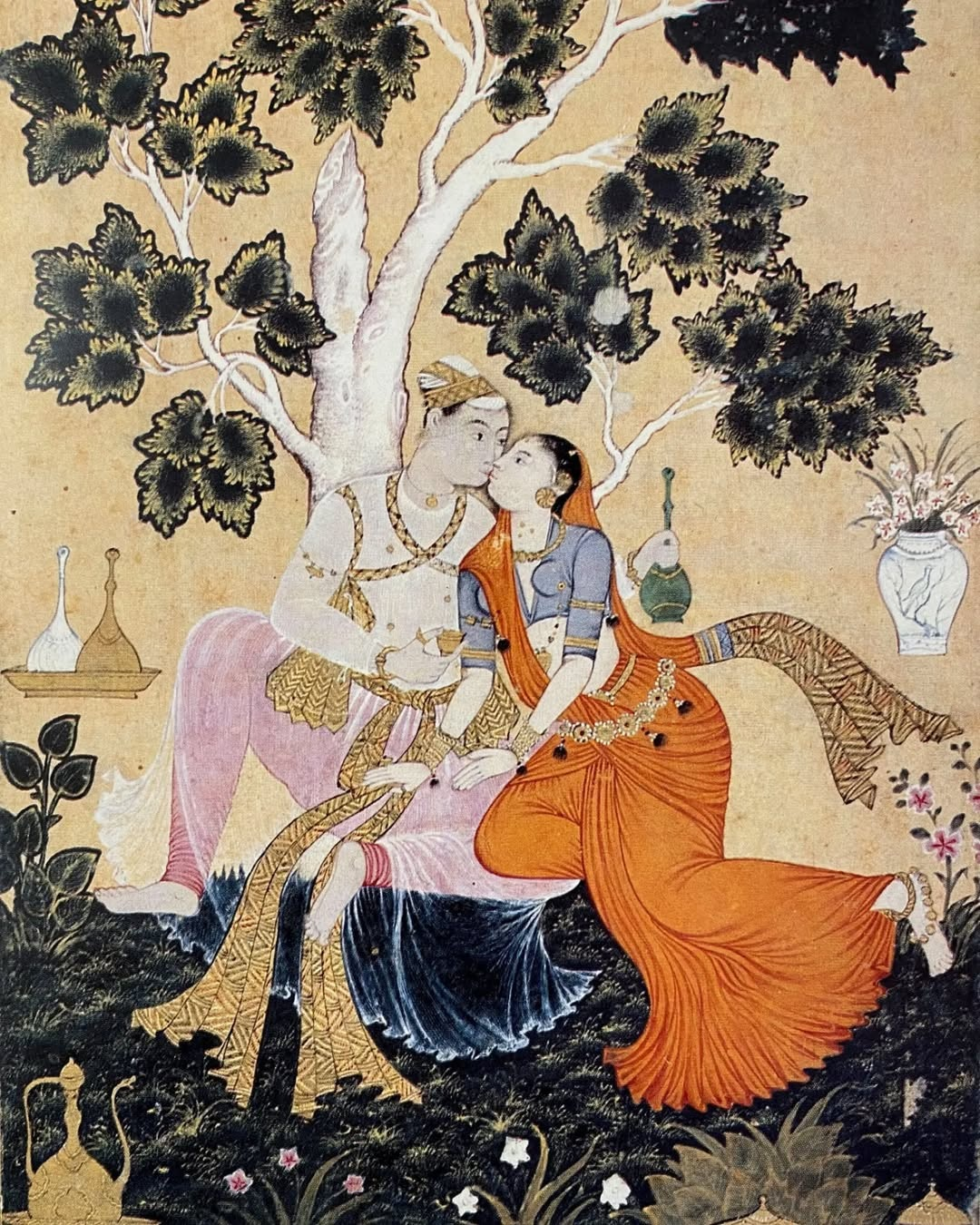
Women dressed in choli and sari, Deccan, 1600 CE.

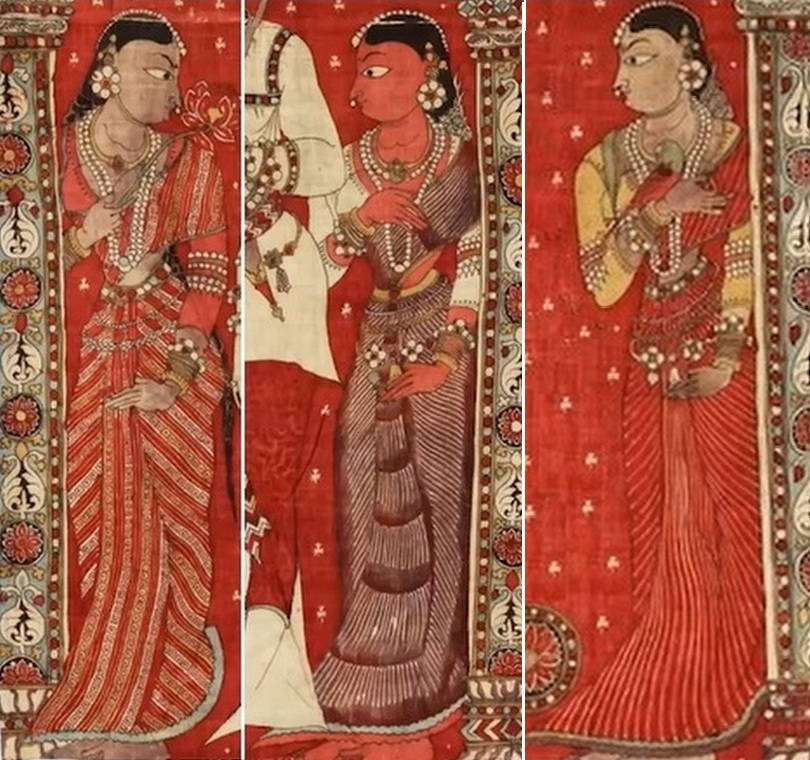
Women dressed in ravike/choli, ca. 1640–50

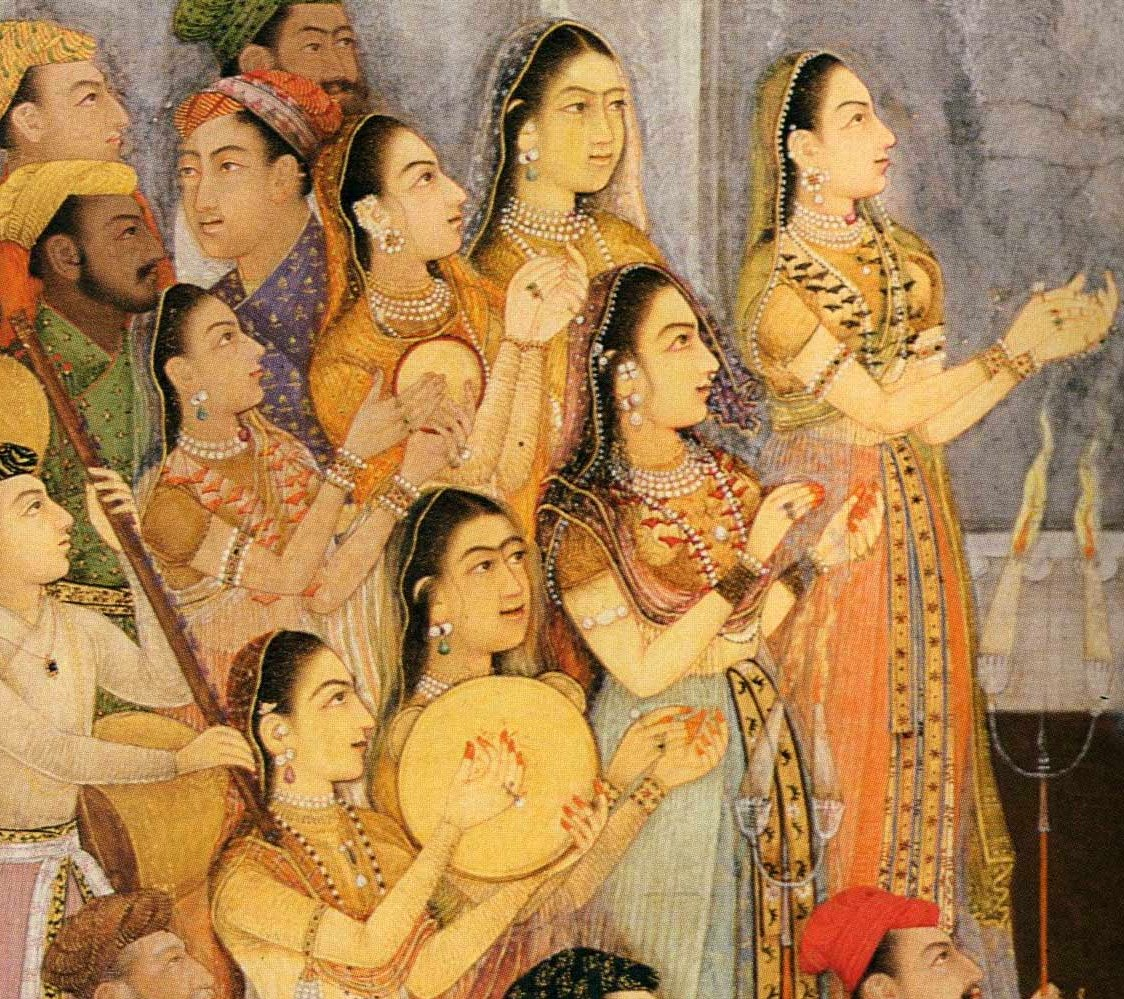
Female musicians at Aurangzeb's wedding - Mughal c. 1636.

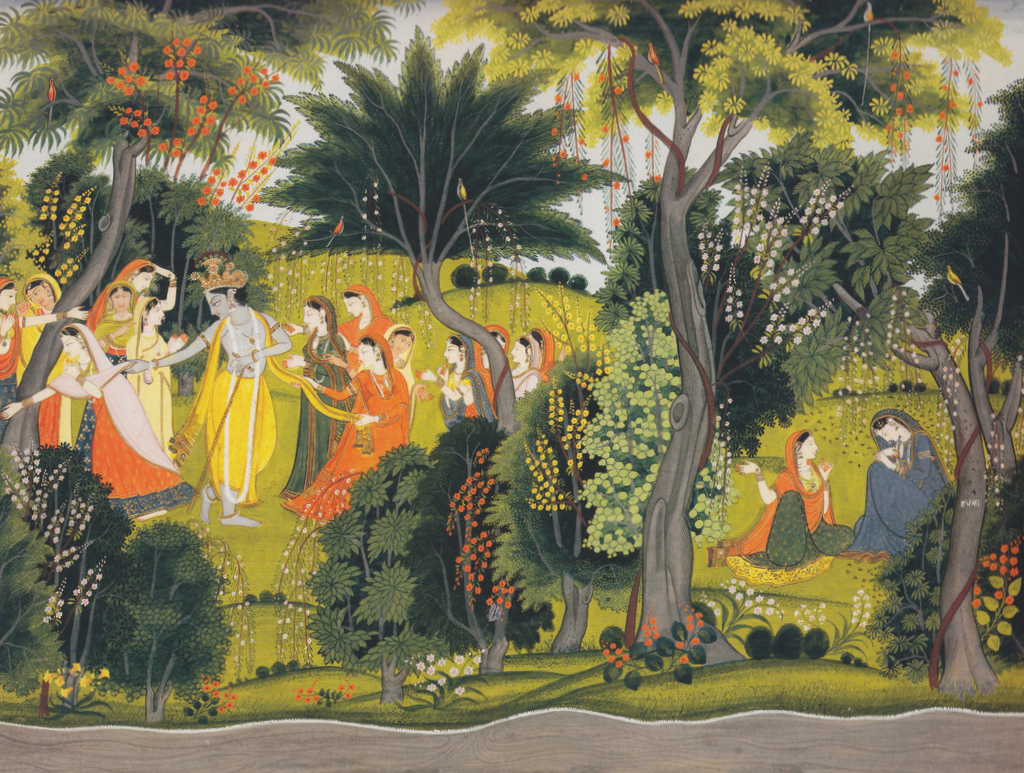
Krishna flirting with the Gopis, to Radhas sorrow - Kangra Painting c. 1760. Full sleeve choli and bodies are worn in Himalayan states of India.

=== Historic photographs ===
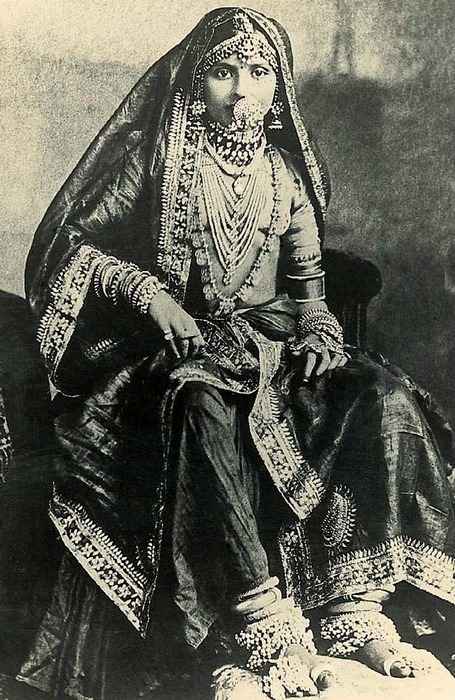
Woman in gagra choli

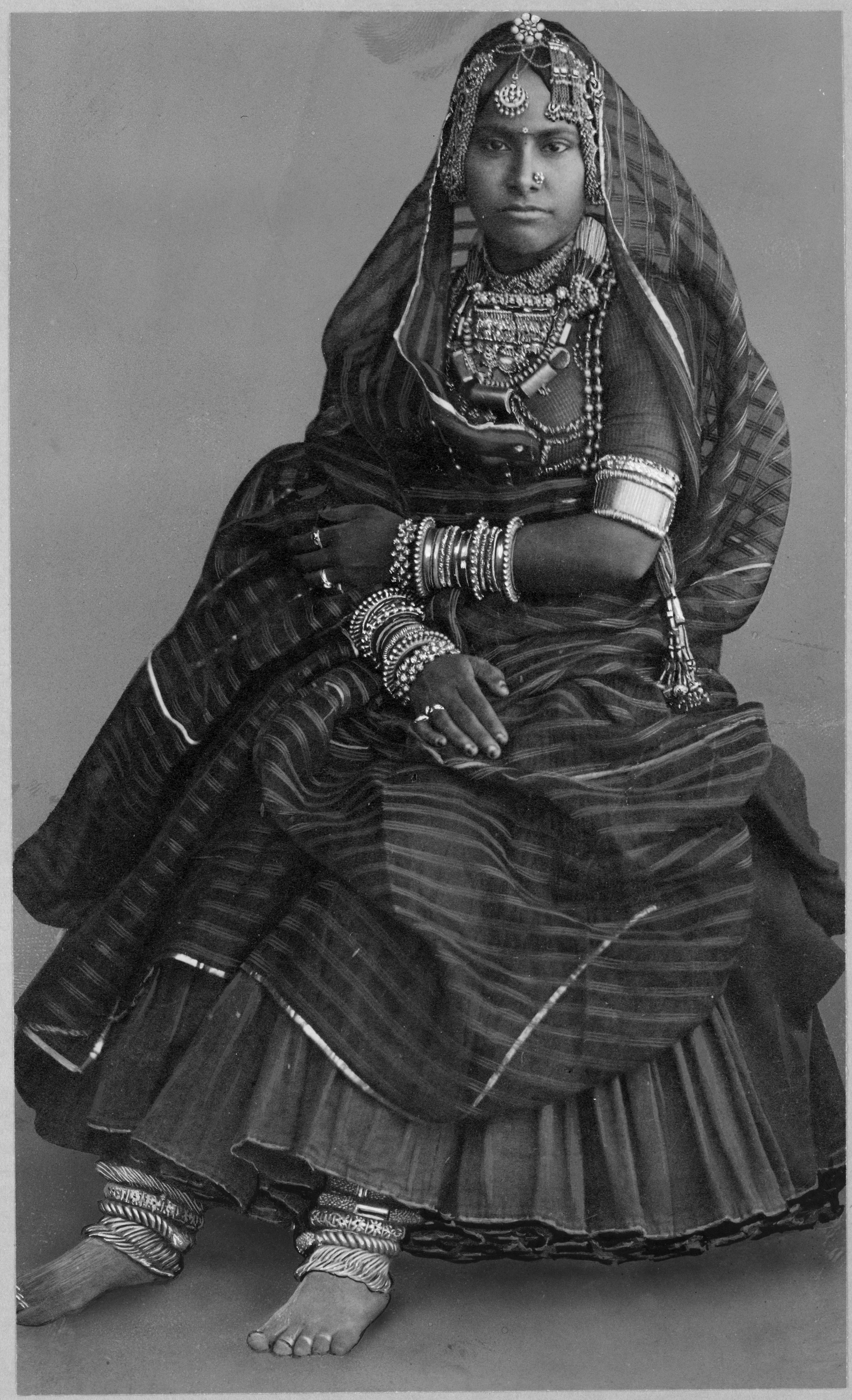
Woman dressed in gagra choli

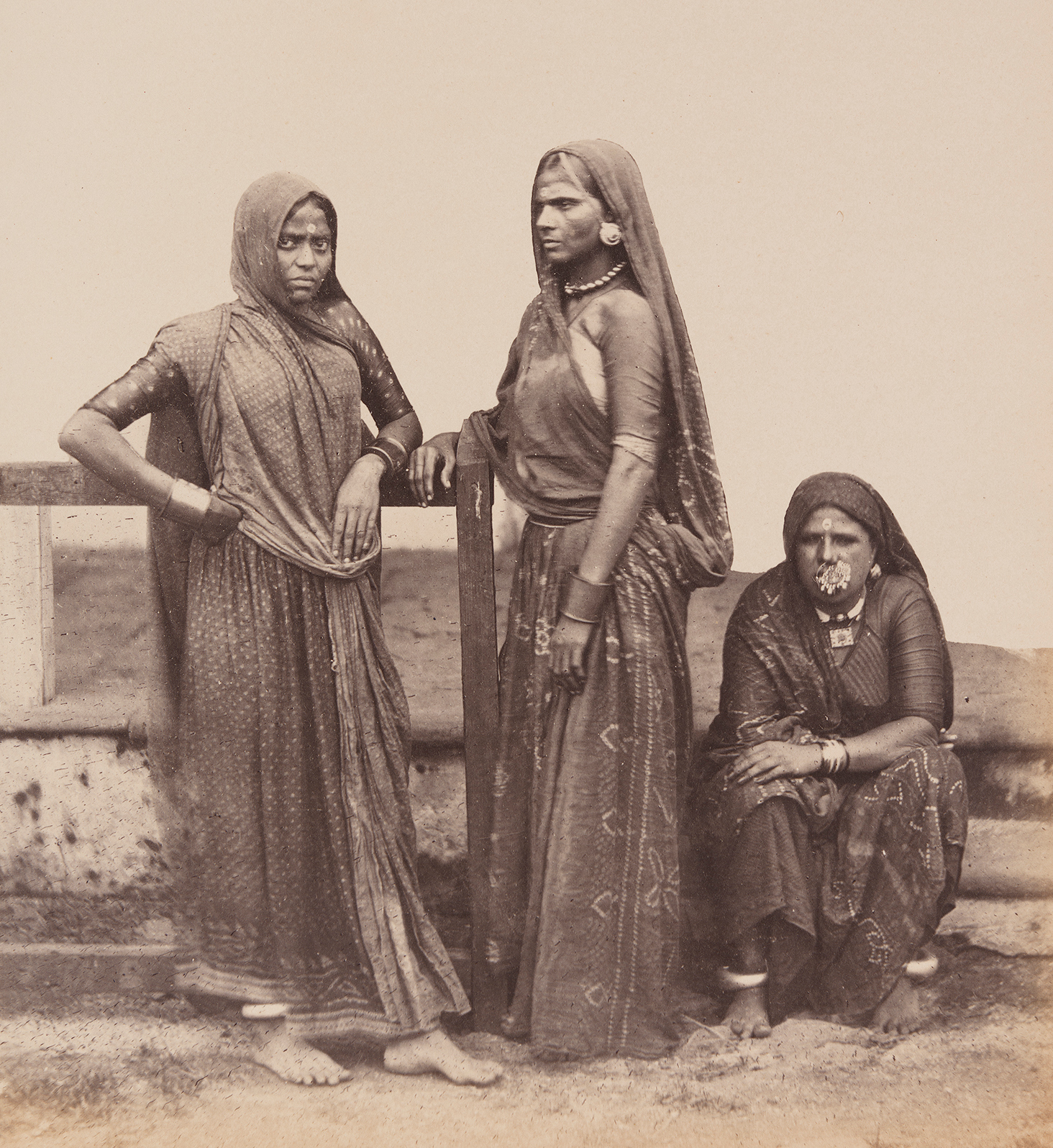
Women dressed in sari and choli (1855)

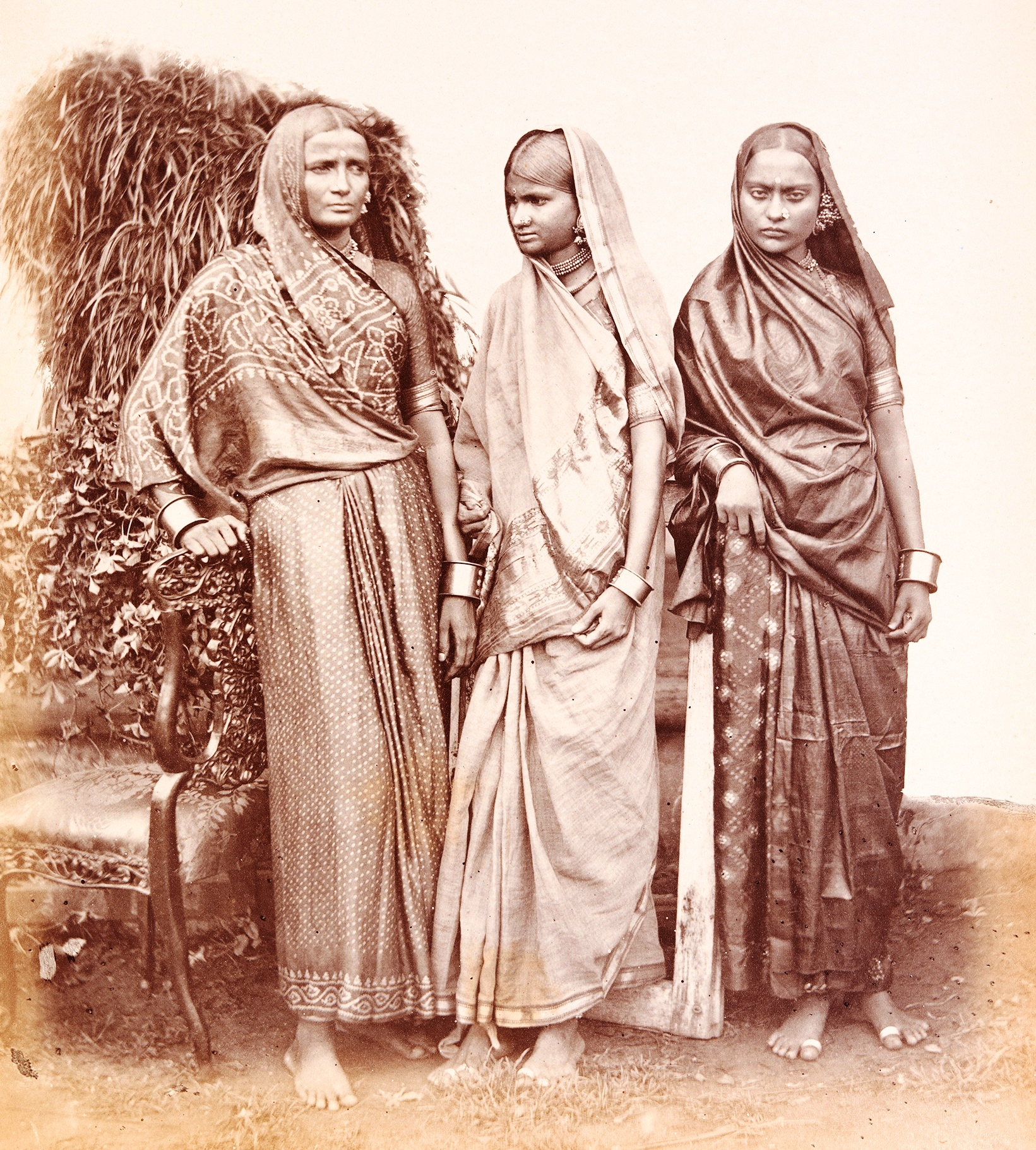
Women dressed in sari and choli (1855)

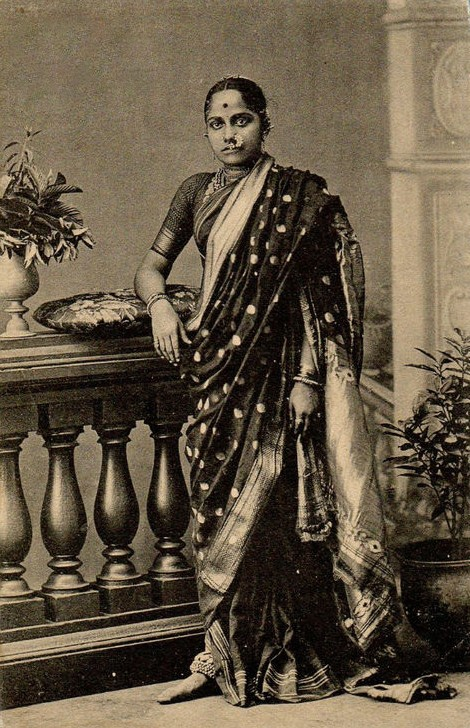
Marathi woman in choli

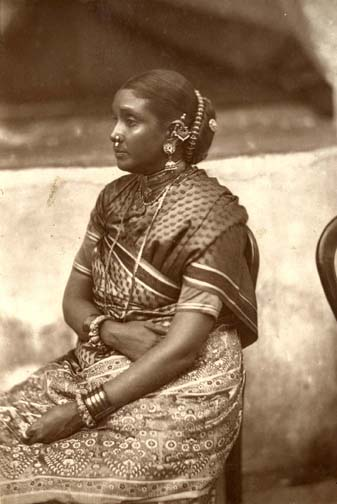
Tamil women in choli

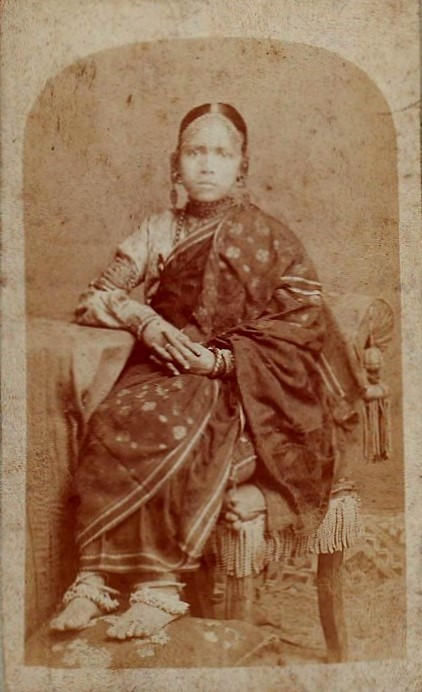
Bengali girl in full sleeve choli (1880)

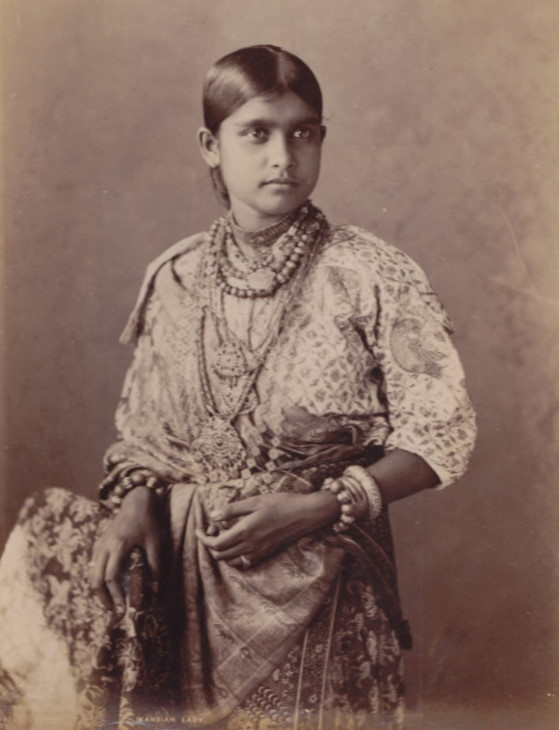
Sri Lankan woman in choli (1880)

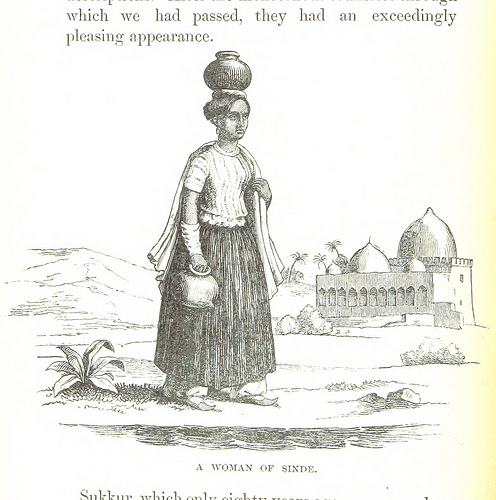
Woman in Sindhi choli 1845

== Changing times ==
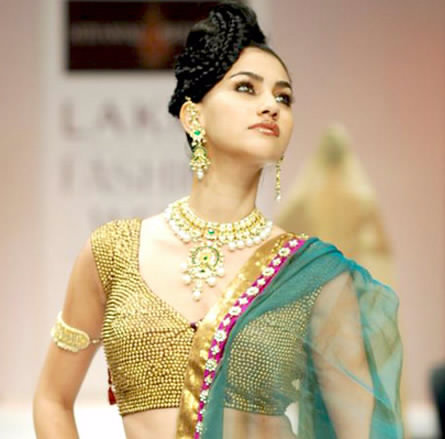
Model wearing a choli at a fashion show, India.

Traditionally, the choli has been made from the same fabric as the sari, with many sari producers adding extra length to their products so that women can cut off the excess fabric at the end of the sari and use it to sew a matching choli. For everyday wear, cotton-based materials and silk cotton are widely considered the most comfortable. Chiffon and silk are best suited for formal occasions. The ideal fabric for cholis in the summer is chiffon and georgette.

Designers have experimented with the choli, influencing pop-culture fashion in the Indian subcontinent, with adventurous tailoring and innovative necklines, such as halter, tubes, backless or stringed. Anupama Raj, a designer and boutique owner, commented that "there is a very real need to re-invent the choli so that it can be worn with a variety of outfits. Just as we see the choli to be a deconstructed form of the blouse, we need to deconstruct the choli." Bobby Malik, an exporter-turned-designer commented "the choli is the most sensuous of all garments created for women. It not only flatters the feminine form, but also brings out the romanticism in a woman. But where Indian designers have failed is at giving it an international look and making it still more beautiful."

== Recent styles ==
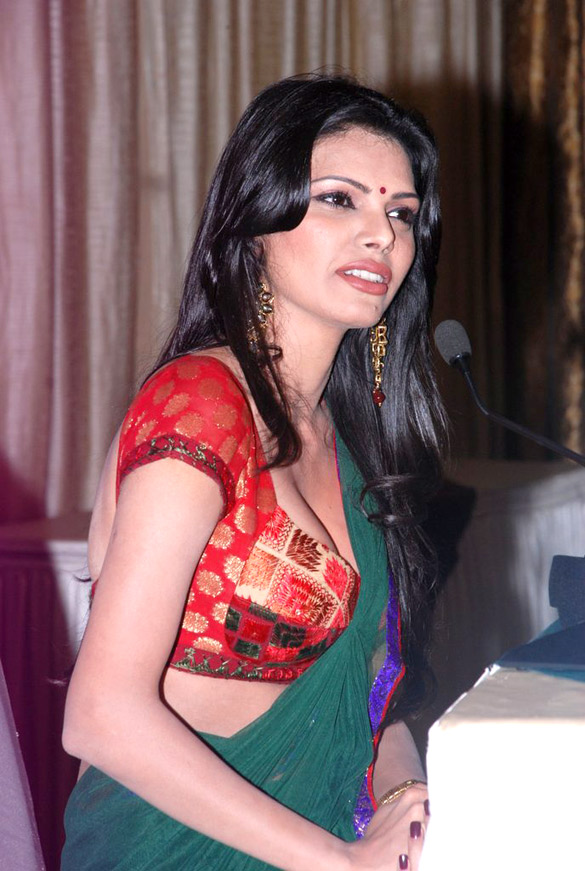

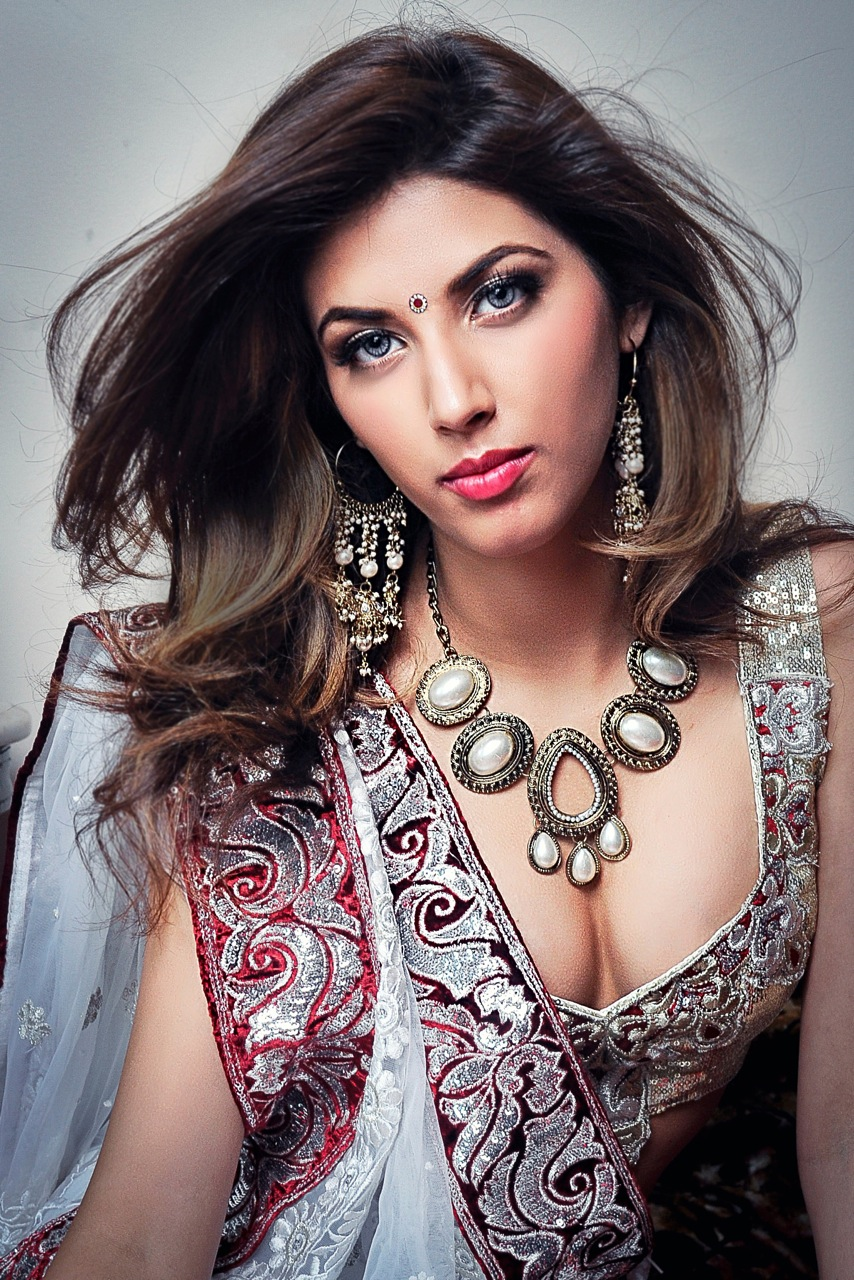

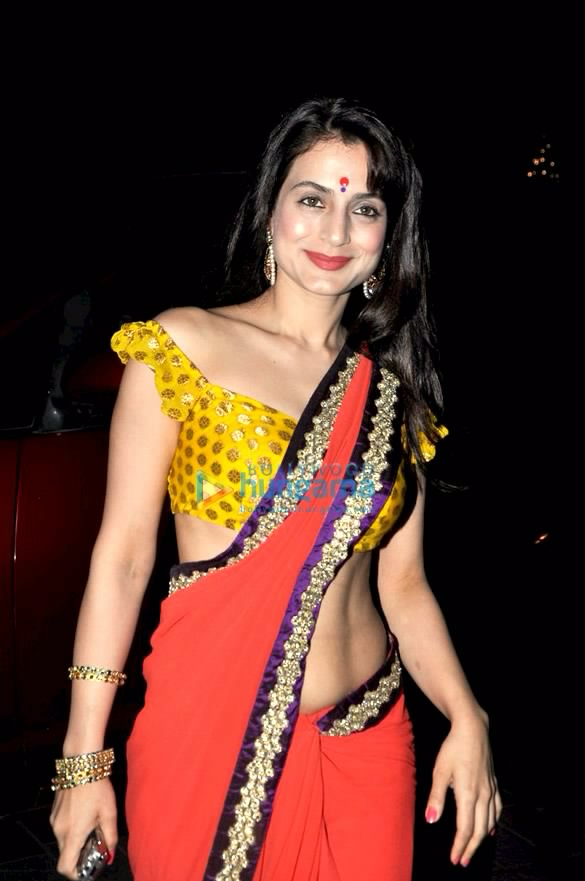

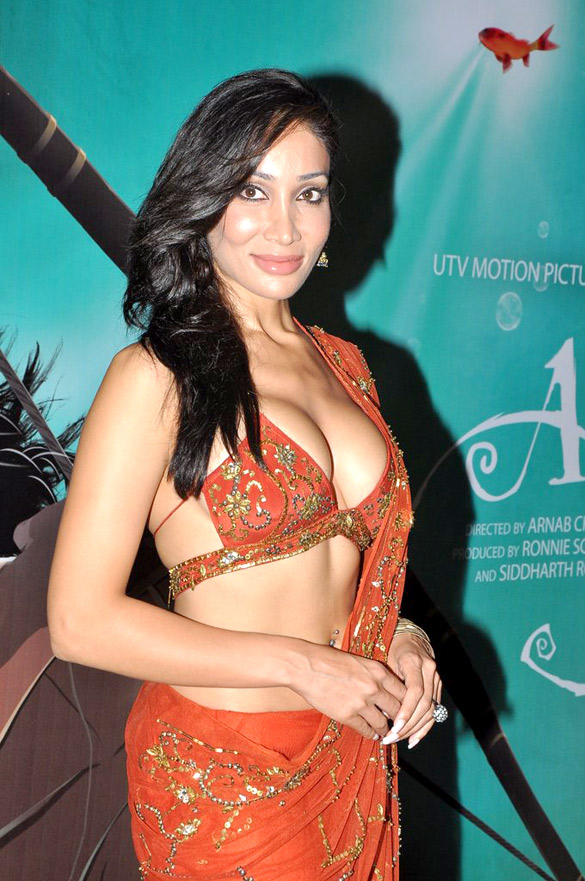

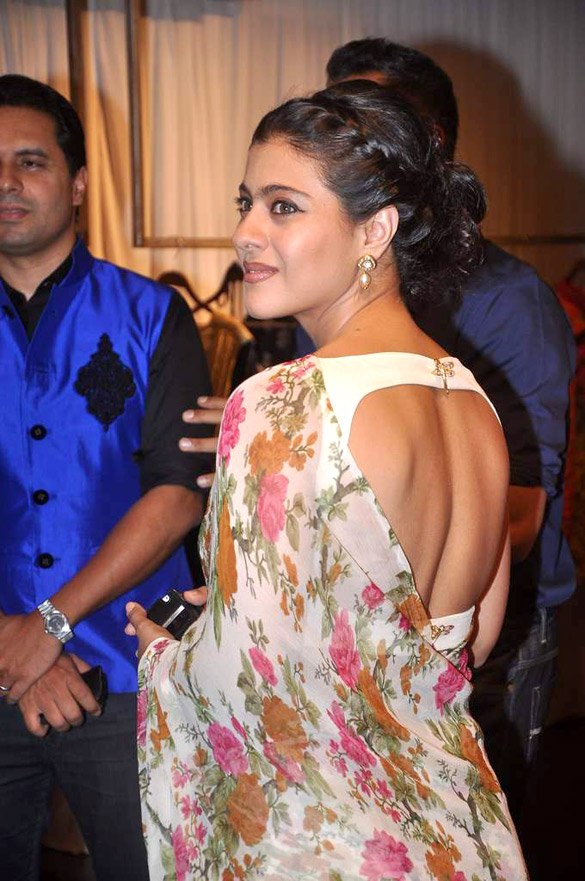

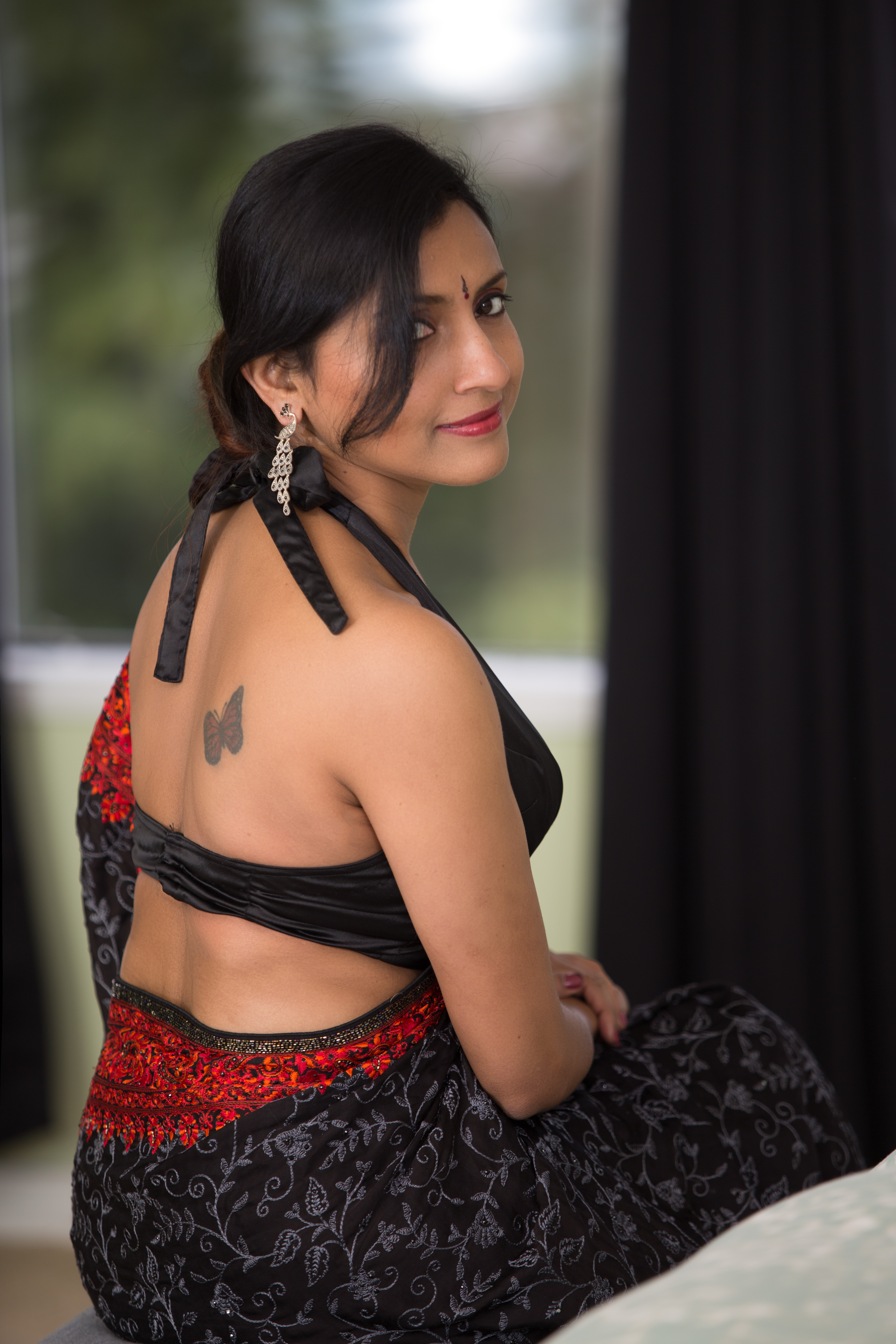

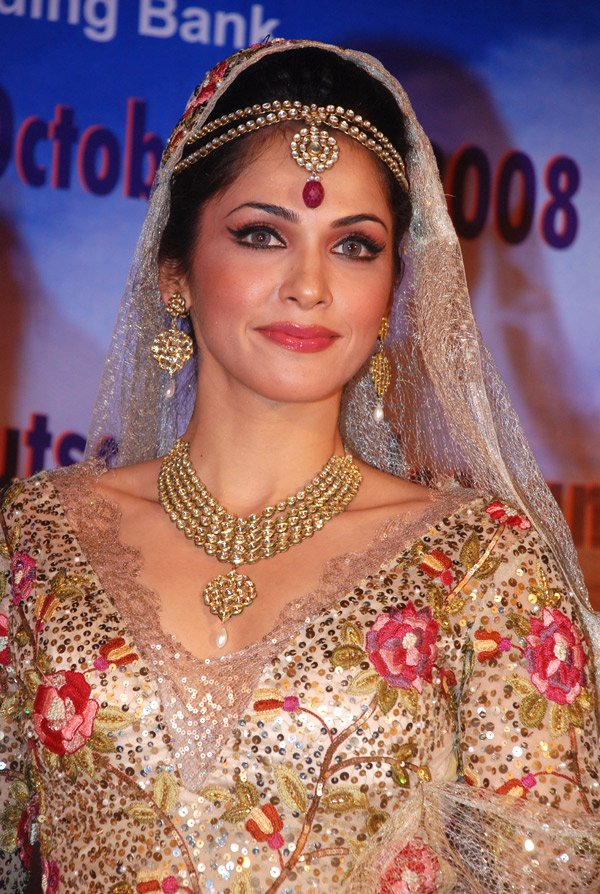

== See also ==
- Blouse
- Bralette
- Gagra choli
- Sari
