= Kurti top =

Upper garments worn in South Asia

A kurti top or simply kurti, is an upper garment worn in the Indian subcontinent that does not leave the midriff bare. It is similar to a waistcoat, jacket, or blouse.

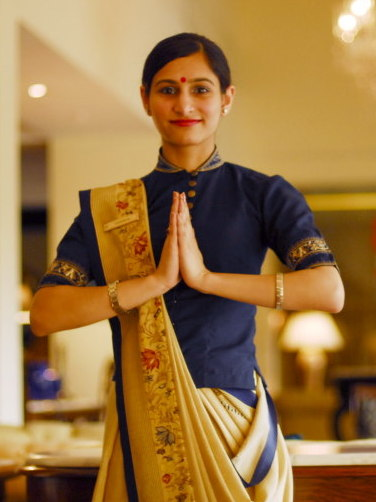
An Oberoi Hotel staff in a dark blue kurti and a light brown sari at New Delhi.

== Kurti ==
In modern usage, a short kurta is referred to as the kurti, which is usually is the attire of females. However, traditionally, the term kurti refers to waist coats, jackets and blouses which sit above the waist without side slits, and are believed to have descended from the tunic of the Shunga period (2nd century BC). The kurti is distinguished from the choli by the latter leaving the midriff exposed.

The kurti can be a unisex garment, in the same way the kurta can be a unisex garment. The main difference generally is that the kurti top is much longer, whereas the kurta is a bit shorter.

Usually the Kurti was longer than male's Kurta, for sometimes it reached down [past] the knees. (Raghoo 1984:3) "She used to wear long dress and kurtee and tie a handkerchief on her head." (Deen 1994:167).

It is a typical dressing pattern of Indians especially the northern regions.

The trend and origin of this clothing style is from the northern India and even today the other parts of the nation though modernalized wear kurti but it is worn by females majorly in the north while the south prefers saree.

There are a number of styles of kurti, which include the following:

== Punjabi kurti ==
In the Punjab region, the kurti is a short cotton waist coat which is buttoned down the front to the waist. In the past, women wore a chain of gold or silver called zanjiri around the buttons. Men wore the zanjiri on the kurta in the Punjab region.

Another style of Punjabi kurti is a short version of the anga (robe). The kurti can also be half or full sleeved and hip length with no front or back opening. Men's kurti is called phatui or wastkot in Punjabi. The kurti of South Punjab, Pakistan is referred to as the Saraiki kurti.

Based on the wish of the consumer the length of the kurti can be decided.

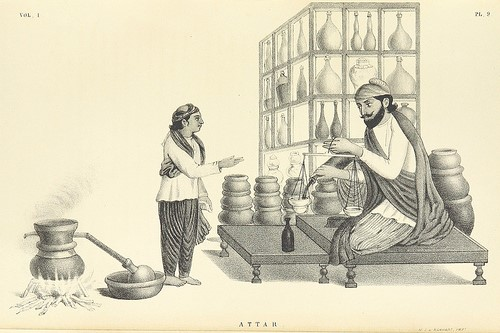
A Punjabi woman in Kurti and suthan visiting the Attar, the pharmacist. 1852

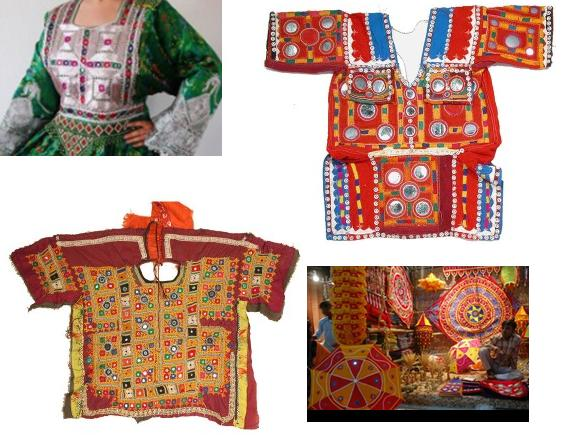
Saraiki kurti

== Bihari kurti ==
In Bihar, the term kurti is used to refer to a bodice which is a combination of the choli and jacket.

== Uttar Pradesh ==
The kurti in Uttar Pradesh and the adjoining Himalayas region is a short blouse.

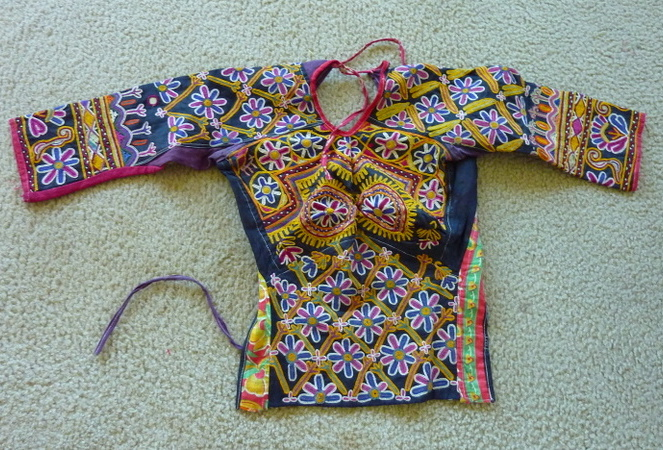
Kurti of Uttar Pradesh

== Gujarat ==
In Gujarat and Kathiawar, the type of kurti (coat) falls to just below the waist.

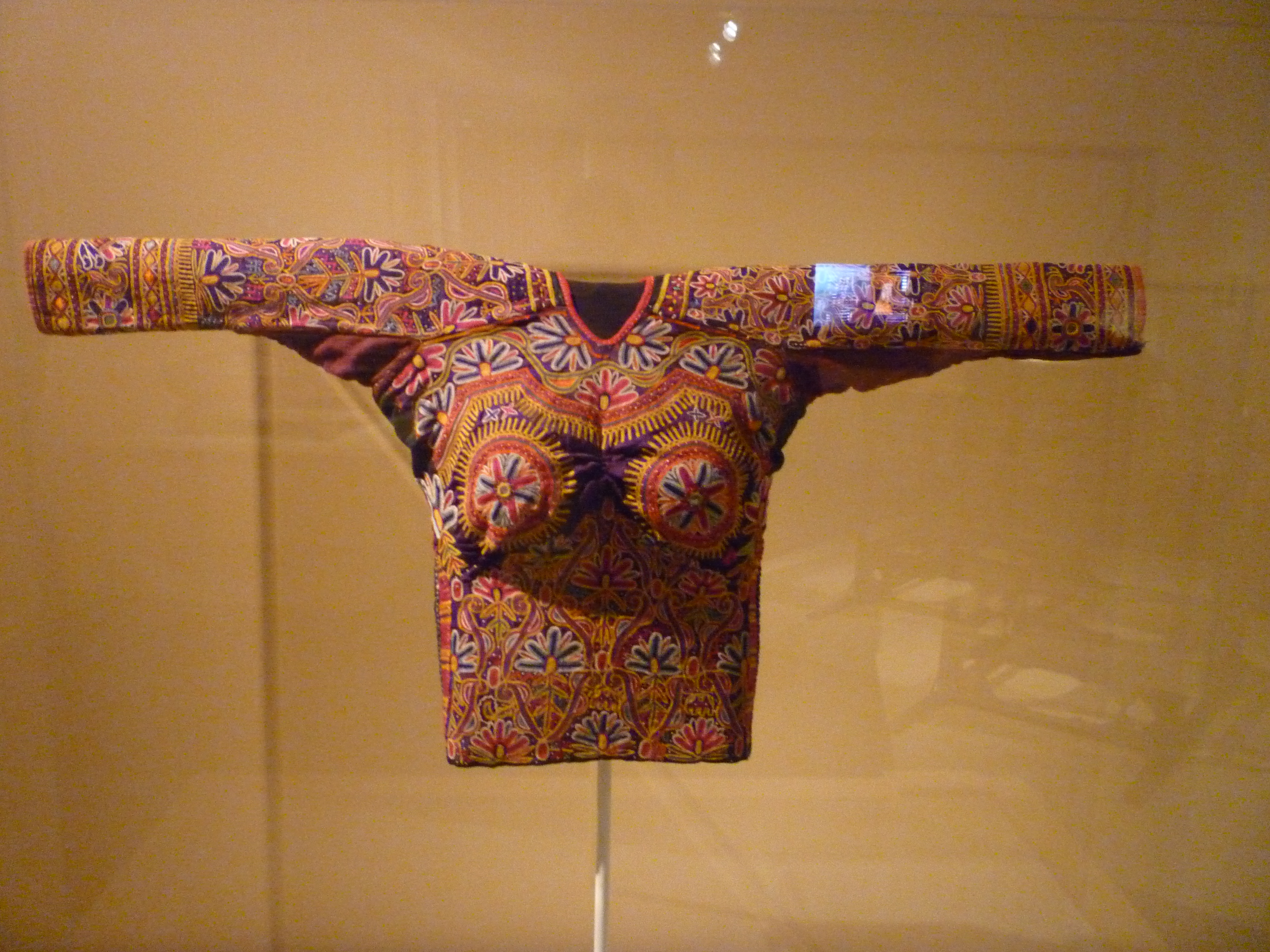
Kutch blouse

== Rajasthan ==
The men's kurt in Rajasthan is a full sleeved, tightly fitting, buttonless vest.

== Sindh ==
Woman, in Sindh, British India, in kurti

== See also ==
- Áo dài
- Kurta
