= Draped garment =

Type of clothing item

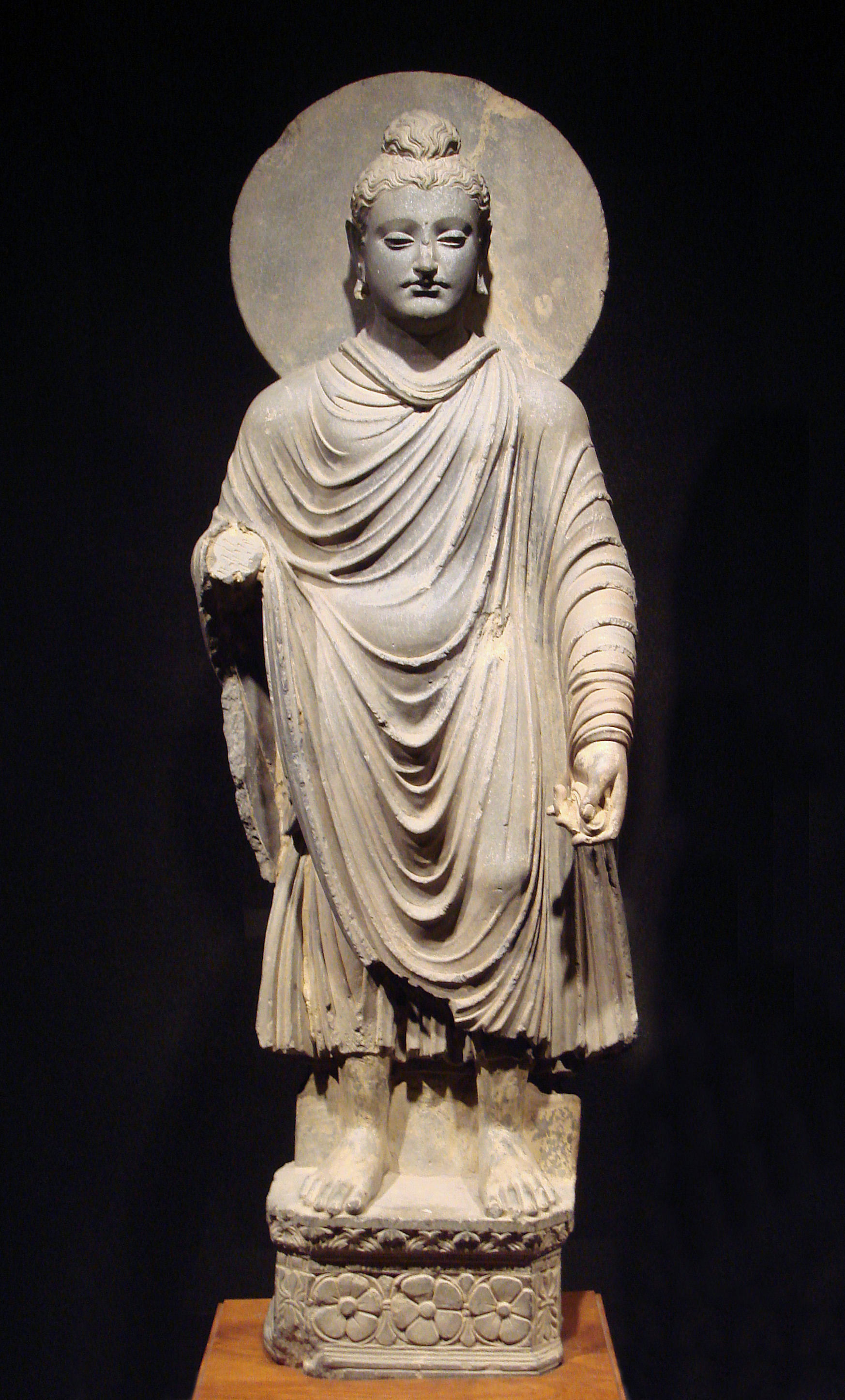
Buddha in draped clothing.

A draped garment or draped dress is a garment that is made of a single piece of cloth that is draped around the body; drapes are not cut away or stitched as in a tailored garment. Drapes can be held to the body by means of knotting, pinning, fibulae, clasps, sashes, belts, tying drawstrings, or just plain friction and gravity alone. Many draped garments consist of only one single piece.

An advanced form of the garment is the tailored dress, which is constructed from fabric that has been cut into pieces and stitched together to fit various parts of the body. In comparison to draped dresses, they are more fitted to the body.

== History ==
Draped garments are among the most ancient and widespread form of clothing. Many visual arts of the Romans and Indian sculptures, terracottas, cave paintings, and wood carvings (also shown in picture gallery) representing men and women show the same, unstitched clothes with various wrapping and draping styles.

Uttariya, and Antariya are few evident clothing items of draped garments from the Vedic period. Kasaya, another rectangular piece of the Buddhist robe, is a real example of the draped garment. Further evolved forms are Sari, and Odhni, etc.

The kāṣāya, also called jiāshā (Chinese: 袈裟), consists of three pieces, with the saṃghāti as the most visible part of the buddhist attire. It is worn over the upper robe (uttarāsaṅga). Uttarāsaṅga is a robe covering the upper body that comes over the undergarment, or antarvāsa. The antarvāsa is the inner robe covering the lower body. The latter are covered with saṃghāti.

== Examples ==
More examples of draped clothing are:

- Uttariya, an upper body garment.
- Adivasah, is a loose-fitting outer garment, it is a type of over garment similar to a mantle or cloak.
- Antariya, a lower body garment.
- Angvastra, a kind of stole.
- Stanapatta, a chest band to cover the breasts.
- Sari, is a draped garment of south Asia, typically wrapped around the waist, with one end draped over the shoulder, partly baring the midriff.
- Peplos, Long draped garment worn by women of Ancient Greece; often open on one side, with a deep fold at the top, and fastened on both shoulders.
- Palla, a long rectangular piece of cloth, folded in half lengthwise and used as a cloak by Roman women.
- Chitons
- Togas, a very long length of woolen fabric that Romans wrapped around themselves, draping it over the left shoulder and arm and leaving the right arm free.
- Himation, an ancient Greek garment similar to the Roman toga.
- Stolas, long full robe with or without sleeves and drawn in with a belt; it was worn by Roman women, corresponding to the toga, that was worn by men. The stola was usually woollen.
- Sudanese thawb, momen's outer draped garment, a rectangular length of fabric, generally two meters wide and four to seven meters long.
- Pareos
- Ponchos
- Cloaks
- Shawls
- Scarf
- Matchcoats, a Native American garment similar to the ancient Greek himation.
- Sarong, a large tube or length of fabric, often wrapped around the waist, worn in Southeast Asia, South Asia, West Asia, North Africa, East Africa, West Africa, and on many Pacific islands.
- Belted plaid, The belted plaid is a large blanket-like piece of fabric which is wrapped around the body with the material pleated or, more accurately, loosely gathered and secured at the waist by means of a belt.
- Dupatta, The dupattā, also called chunni, chunari, chundari, lugda, rao/rawo, gandhi, pothi, orna, and odhni is a long shawl-like scarf traditionally worn by women in the Indian Subcontinent.
- Serape, The serape, sarape or jorongo is a long blanket-like shawl or cloak, often brightly colored and fringed at the ends, worn in Mexico, especially by men.
- Rebozo, A rebozo is a long flat garment, very similar to a shawl, worn mostly by women in Mexico.
- Kitenge, A kitenge or chitenge (pl. vitenge Swahili; zitenge in Tonga) is an East African, West African and Central African piece of fabric similar to a sarong, often worn by women and wrapped around the chest or waist, over the head as a headscarf, or as a baby sling.
- Manta esperancera, garment typical of the Canary islands.

== Picture gallery ==
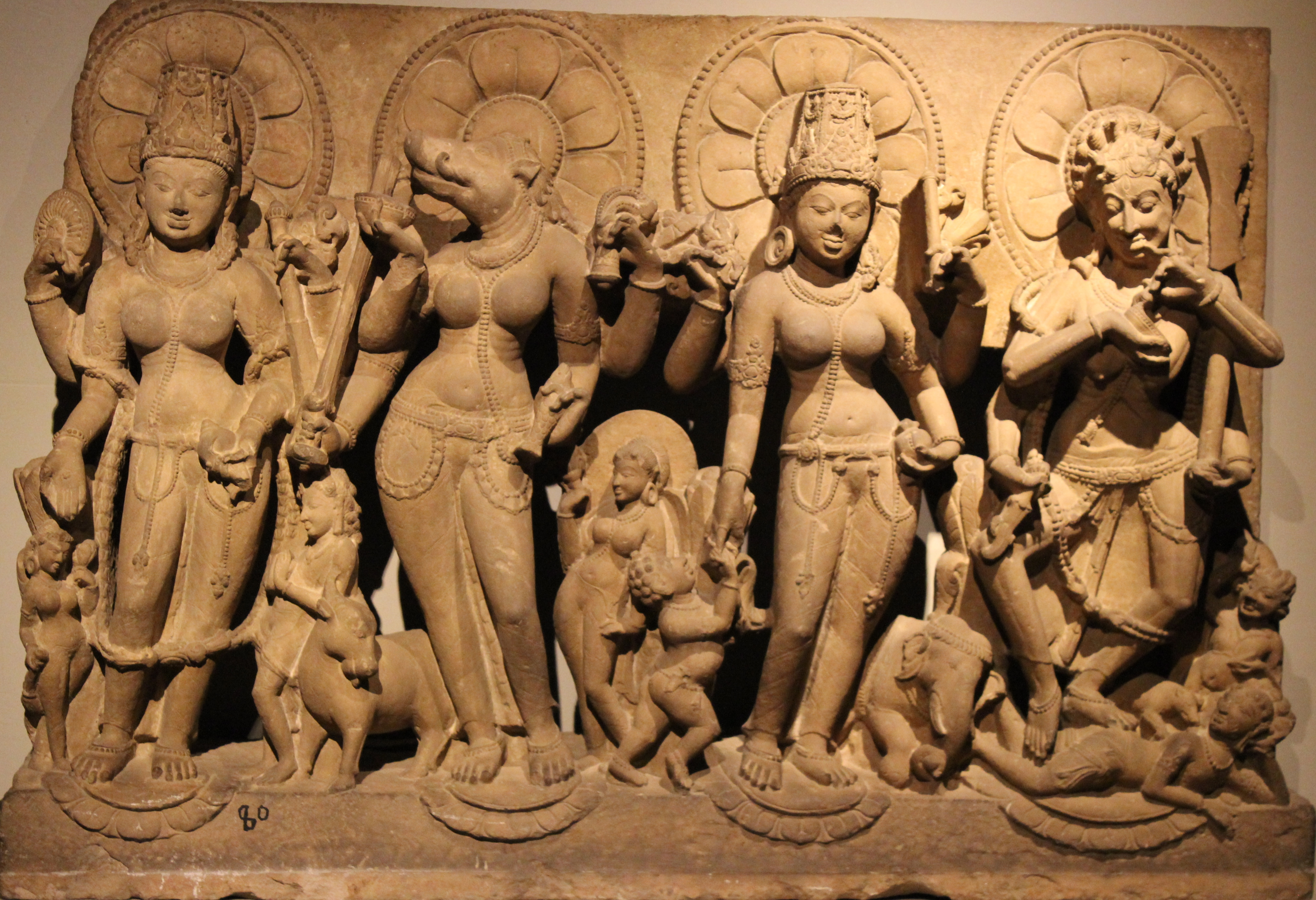
Shaktism is a Goddess-centric tradition of Hinduism. Relief statues of Vaishnavi, Varahi, Indrani and Chamunda

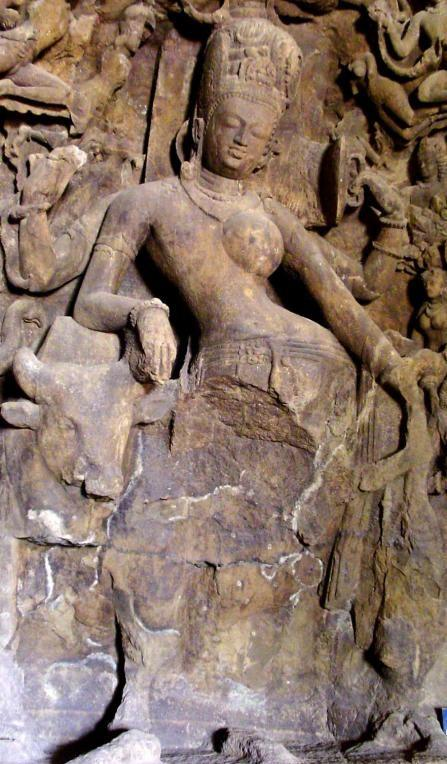
In Shakta theology, the female and male are interdependent realities, represented with Ardhanarishvara icon. Left: A 5th century art work representing this idea at the Elephanta Caves; Right: a painting of Ardhanarishvara.

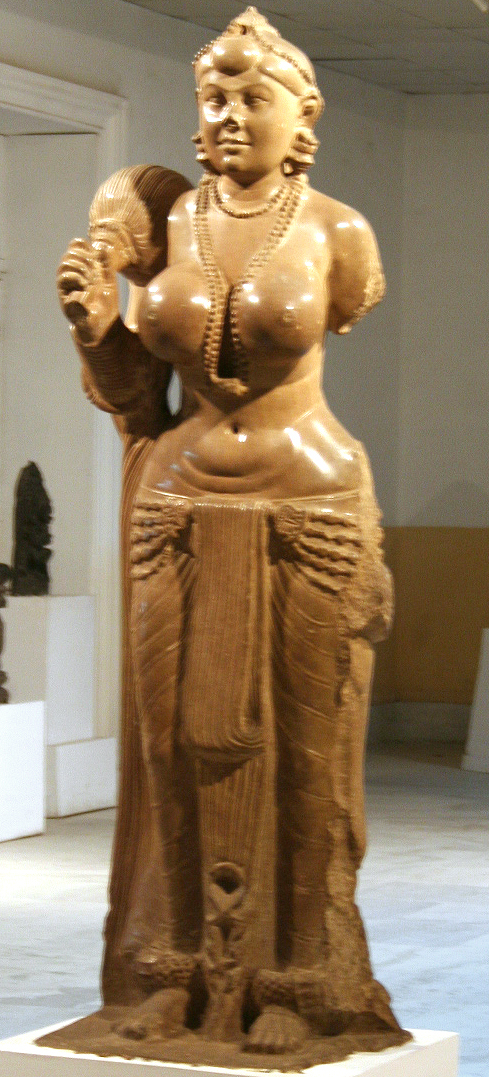
Yakshini wearing dhoti wrap and elaborate necklace, Mauryan period.

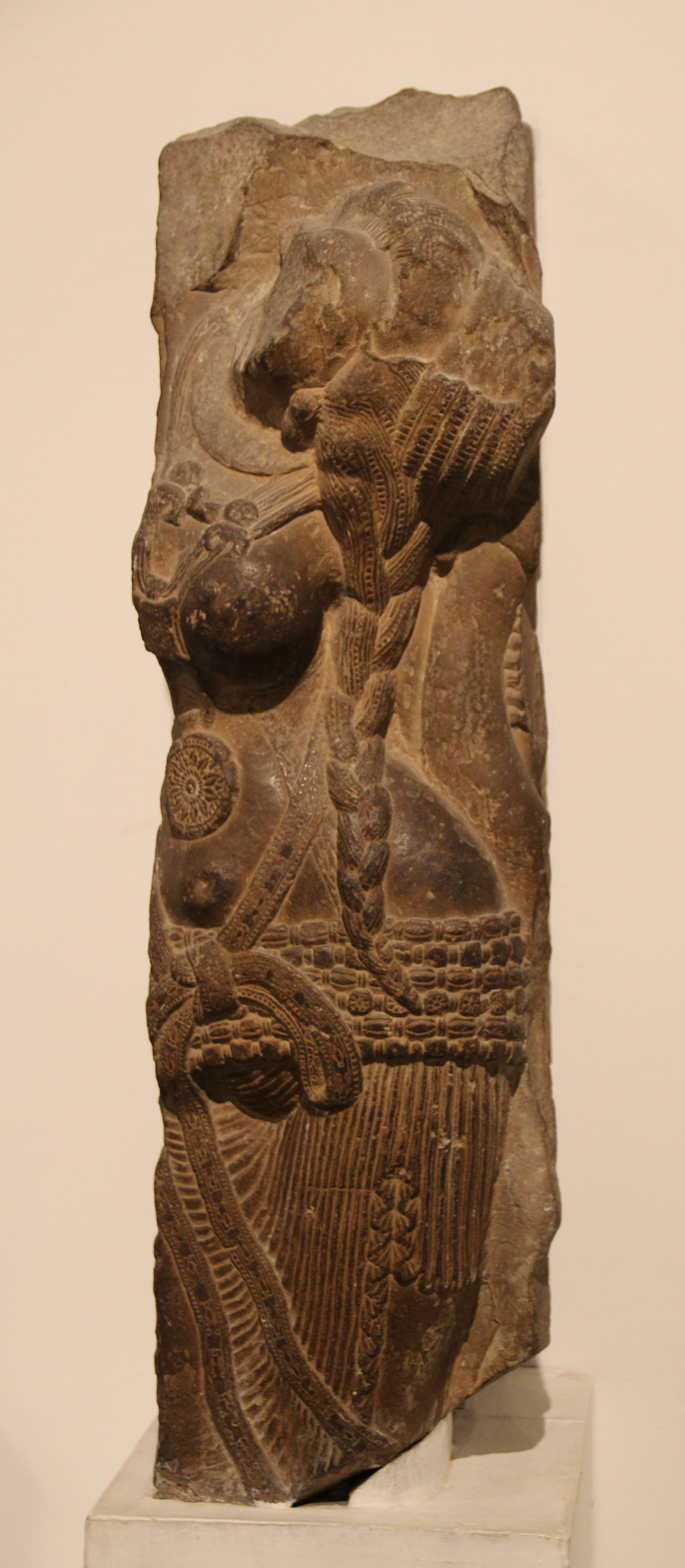
The "Mehrauli Yakshi", dated to 150 BCE, Mathura.

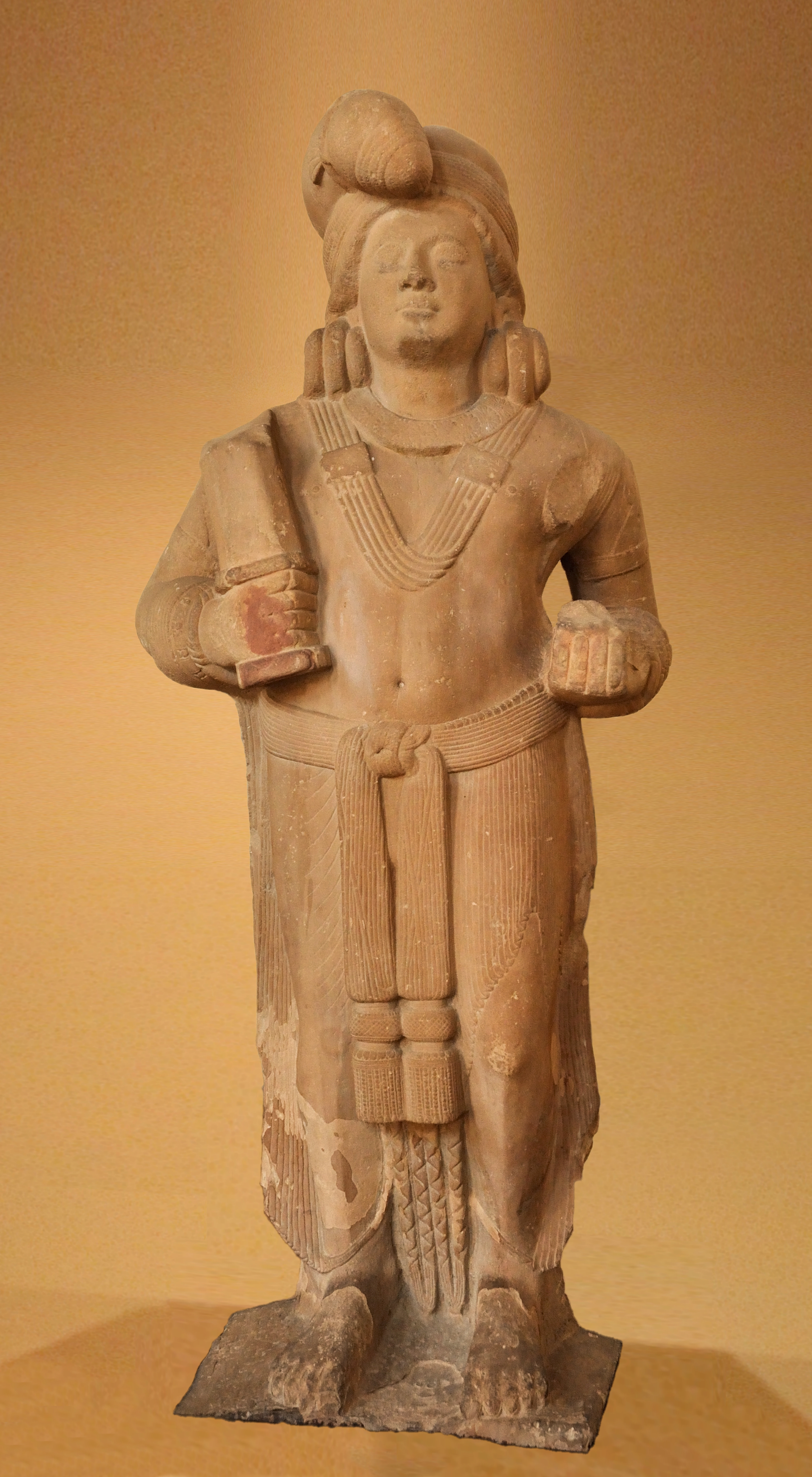
Mudgarpani Yaksha, 100 BCE.

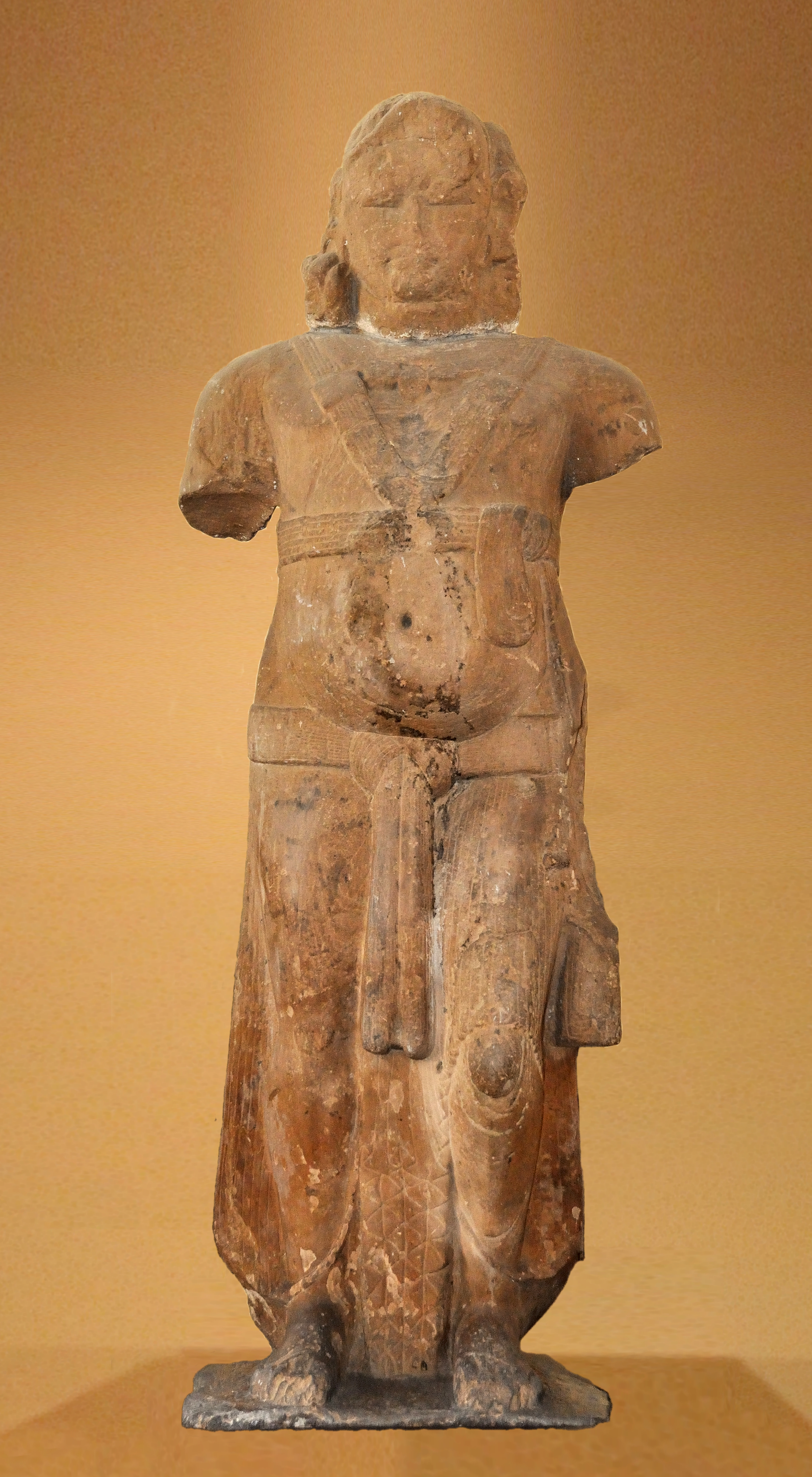
Parkham Yaksha, 150 BCE.

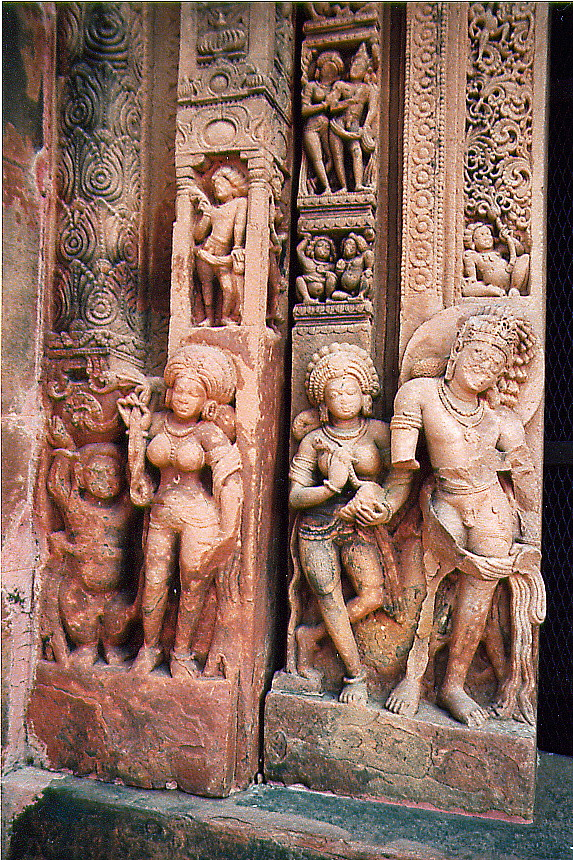
Females statues wearing drapes are depicted at Dashavatara Temple.

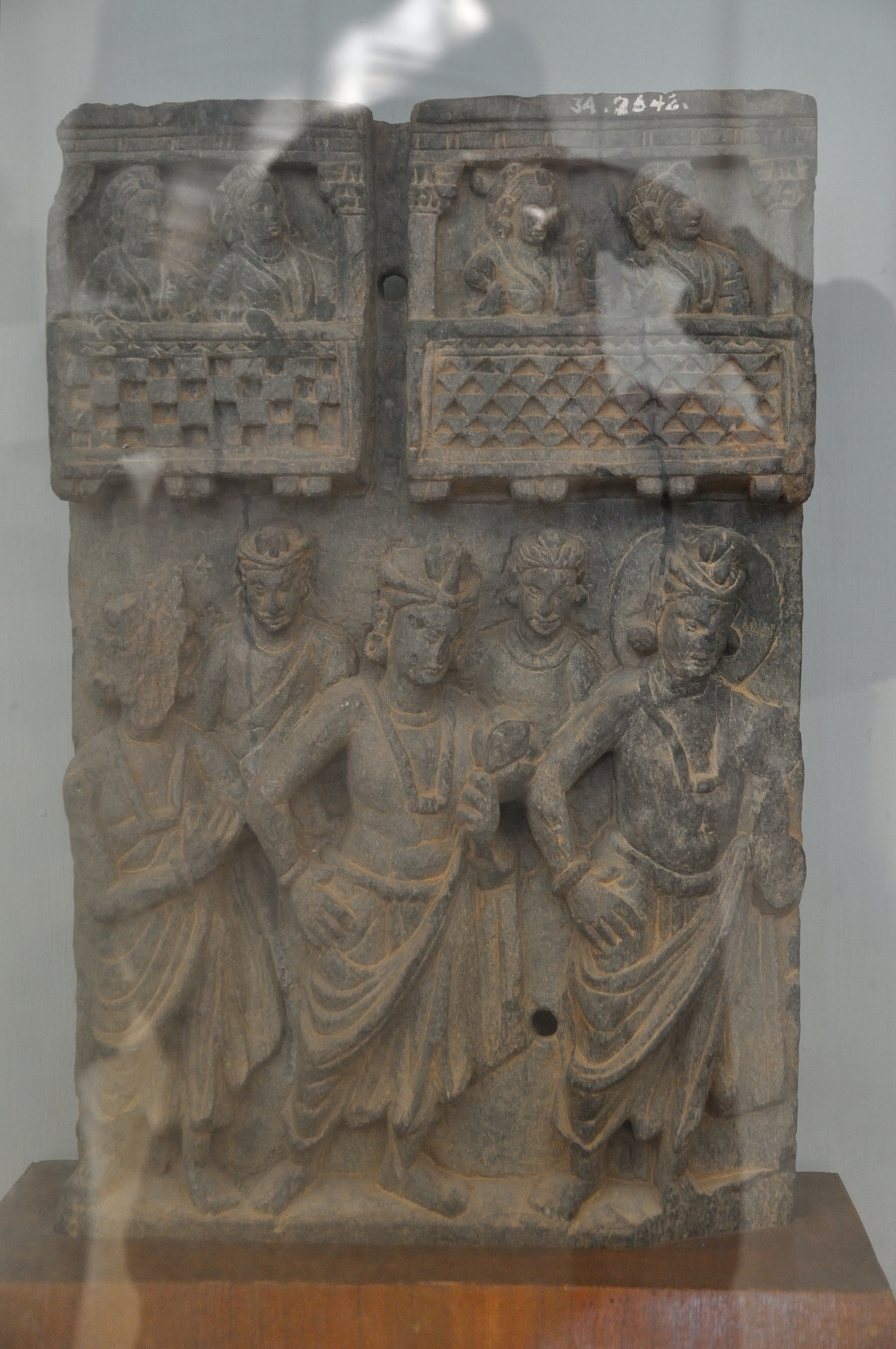
Relief depicting men in antriya and uttariya, 1st century CE.

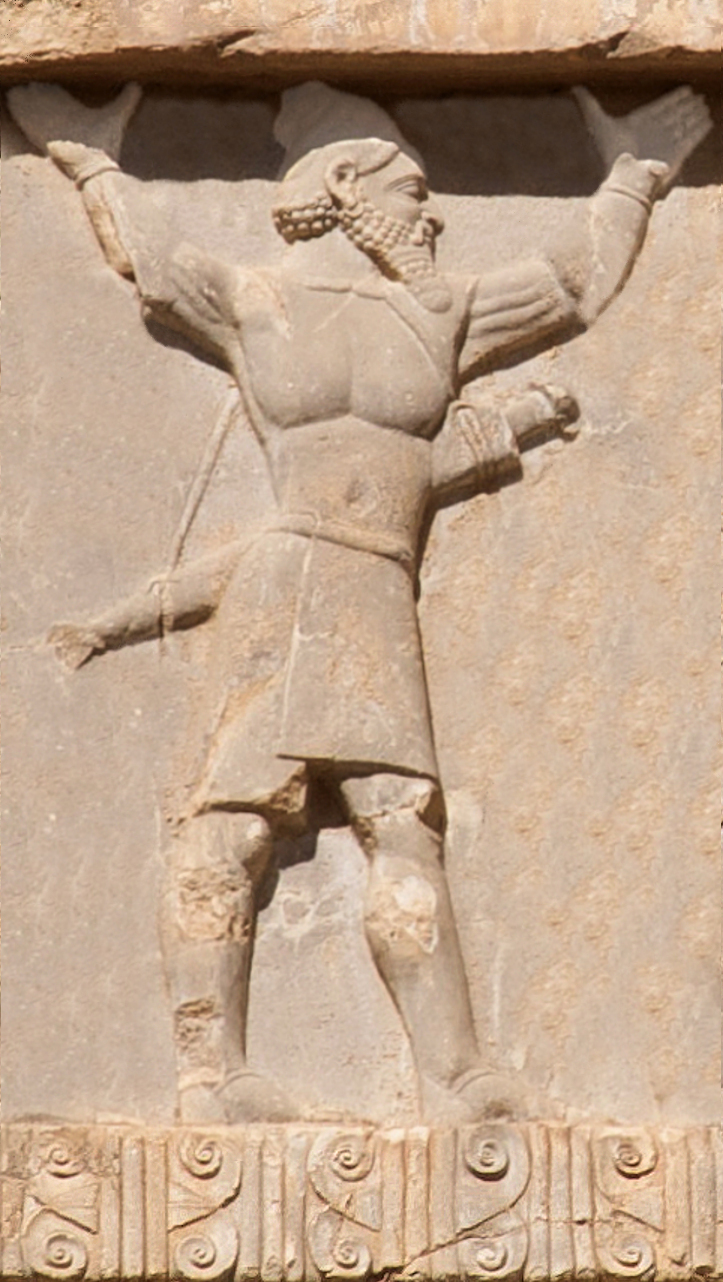
Hindush soldier, circa 480 BCE. He wears a Dhoti and a turban. Tomb of Xerxes I.

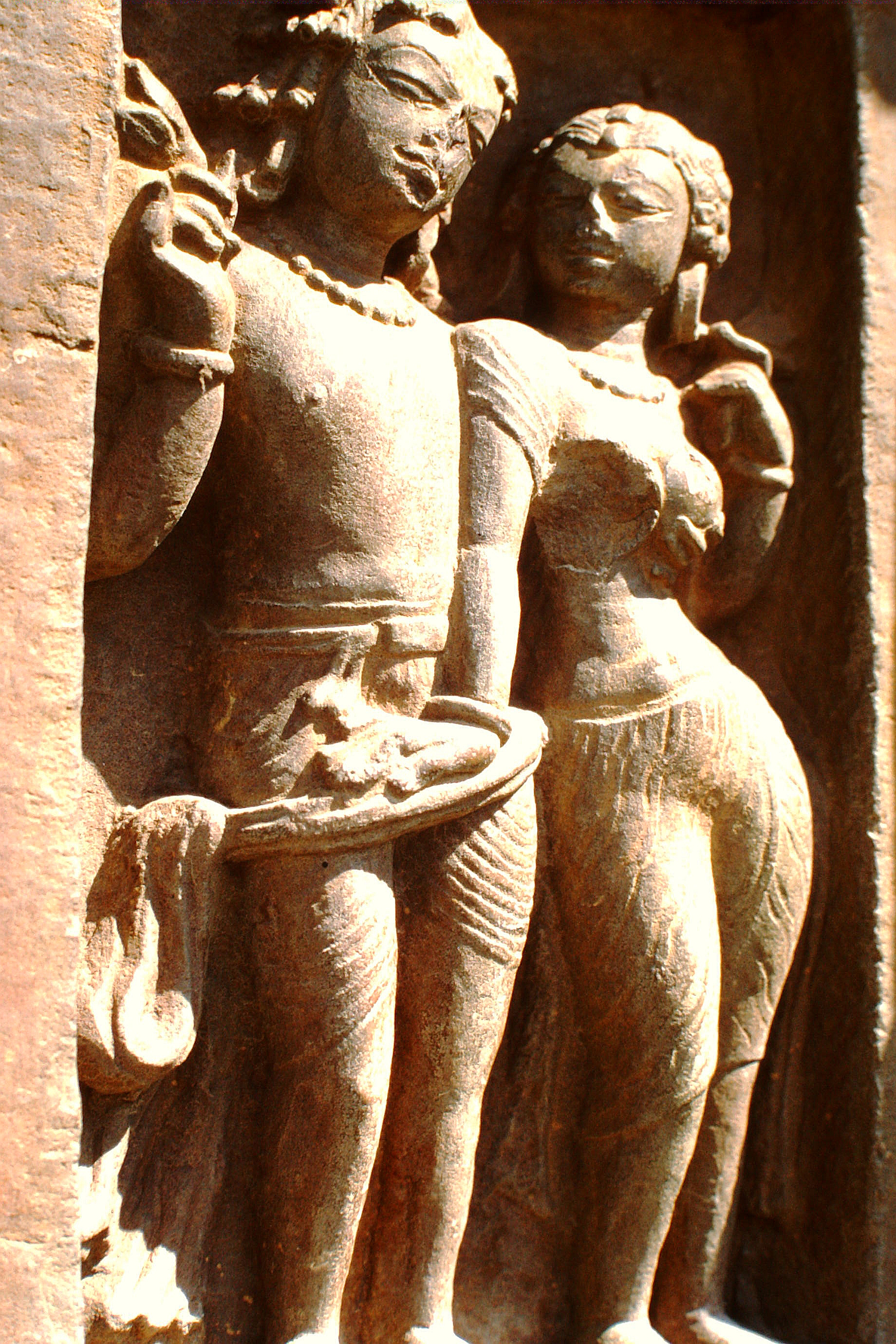
Male and female statues wearing drapes at Nachna Hindu temples.

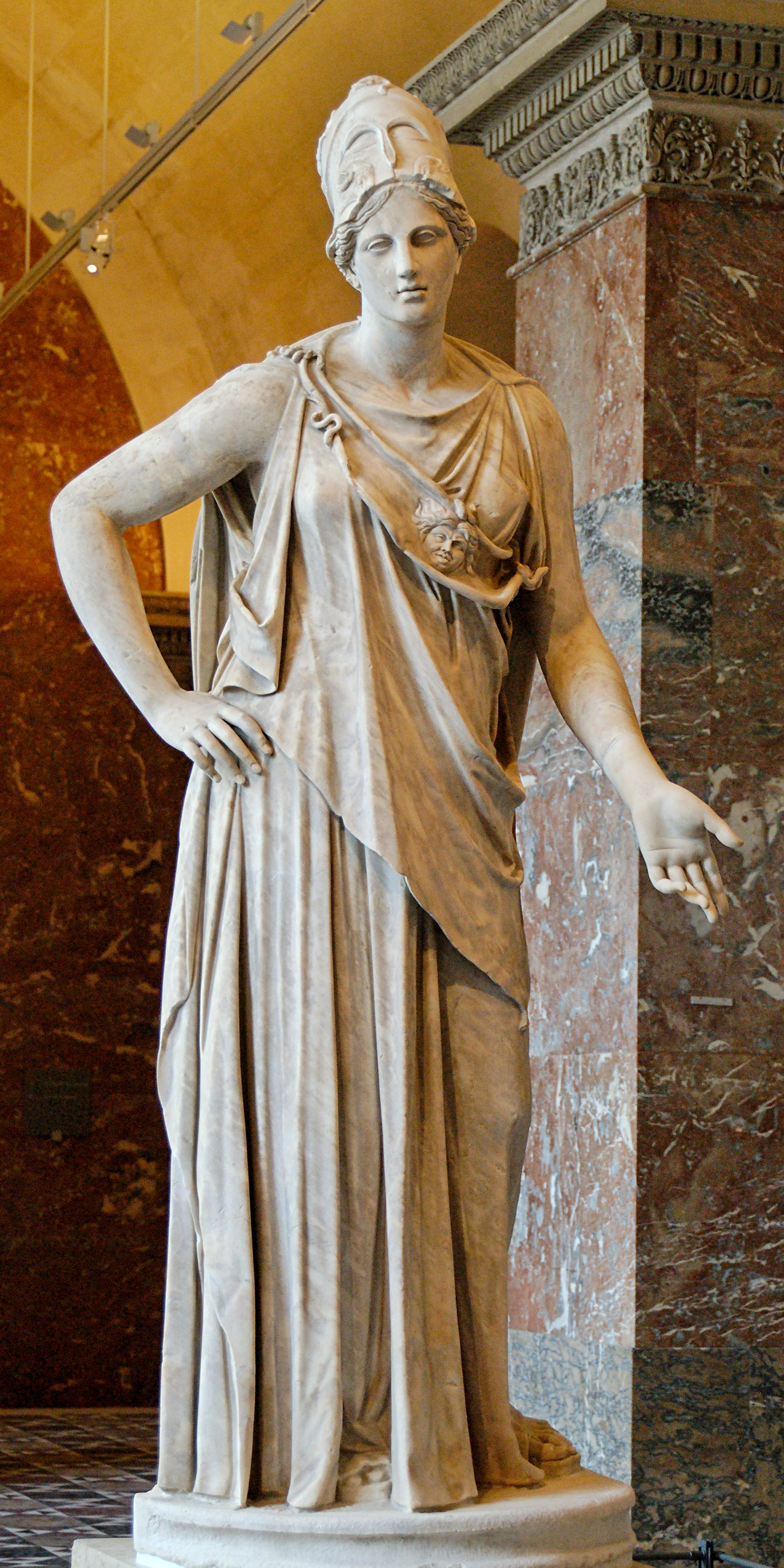
So-called “Mattei Athena”. Marble, Roman copy from the 1st century BC/AD after a Greek original of the 4th century BC, attributed to Cephisodotos or Euphranor. Related to the bronze Piraeus Athena.

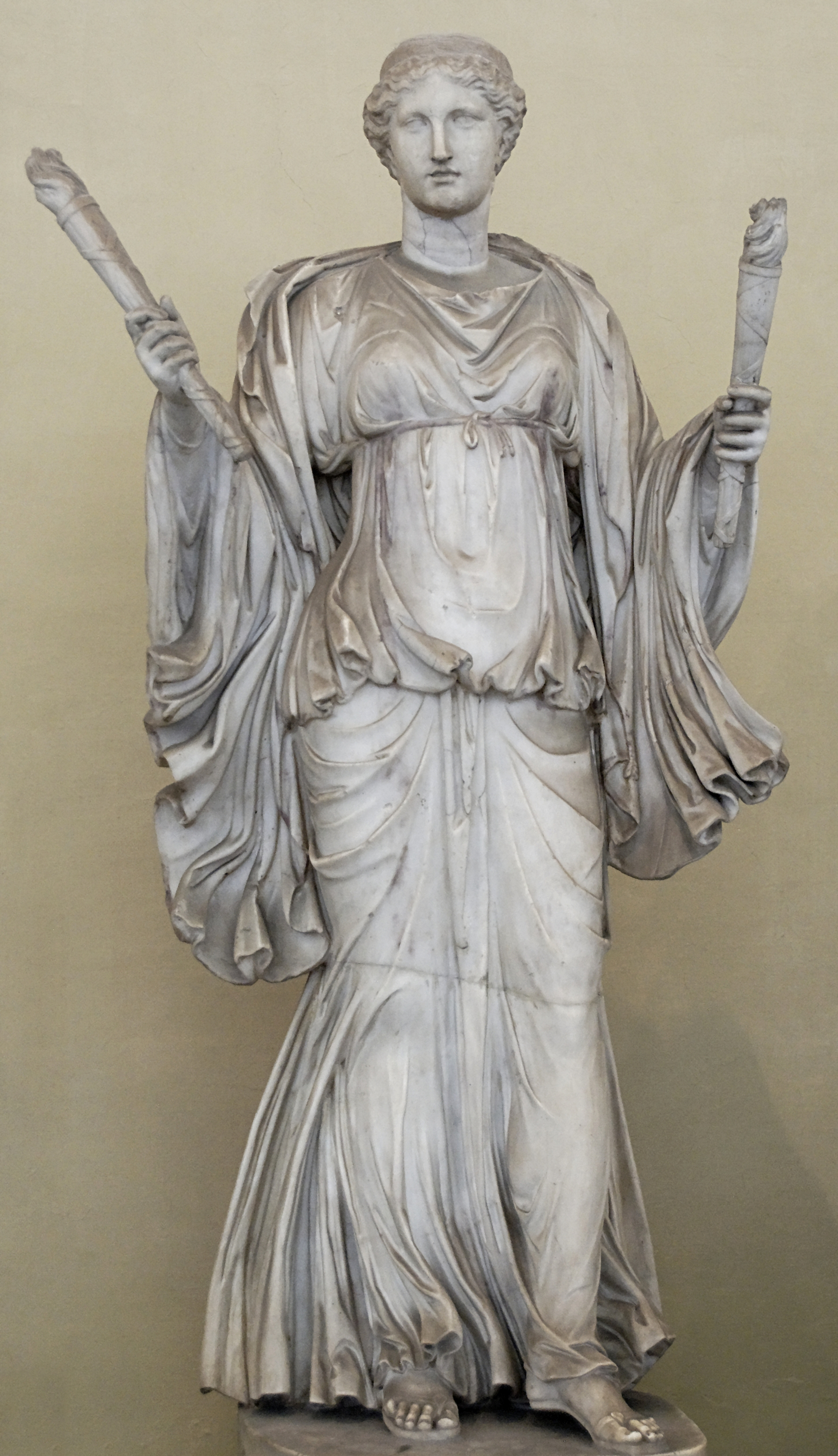
Artemis holding torches. Marble, Roman copy of the 2nd century AD after a Greek original of the 4th century BC.

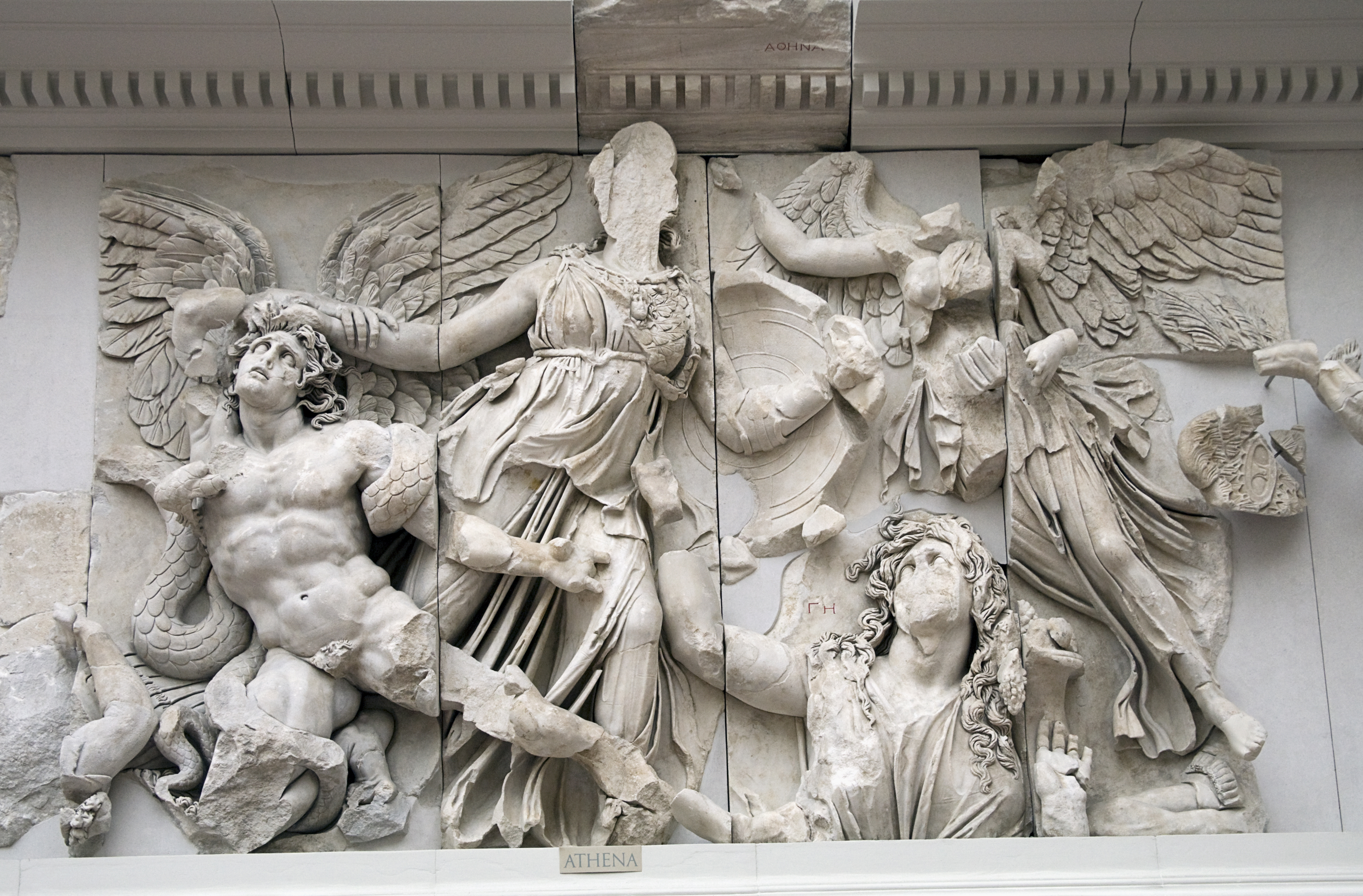
Relief of Athena and Nike slaying the Gigante Alkyoneus (?) from the Gigantomachy Frieze on the Pergamon Altar (early second century BC)

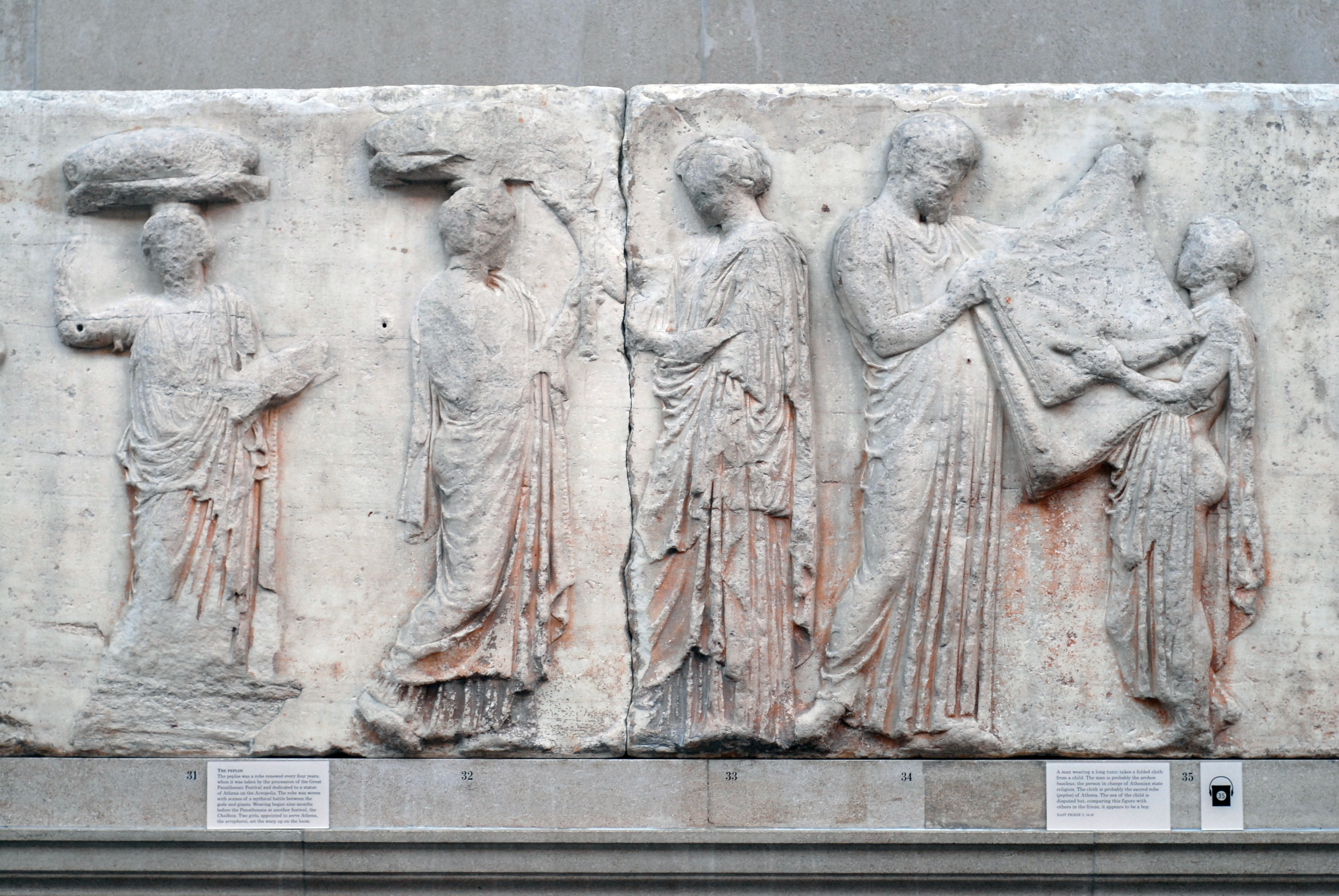
A new peplos was woven for the patron of craft and weaving and ceremonially brought to dress her cult image (British Museum).

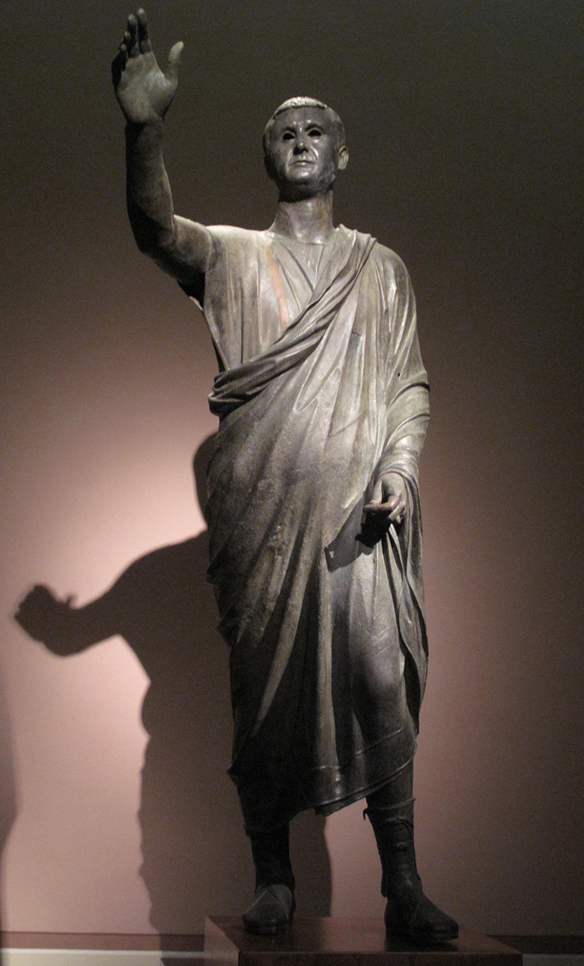
The Orator, c. 100 BC, an Etrusco-Roman bronze statue depicting Aule Metele (Latin: Aulus Metellus), an Etruscan man wearing a Roman toga while engaged in rhetoric; the statue features an inscription in the Etruscan alphabet

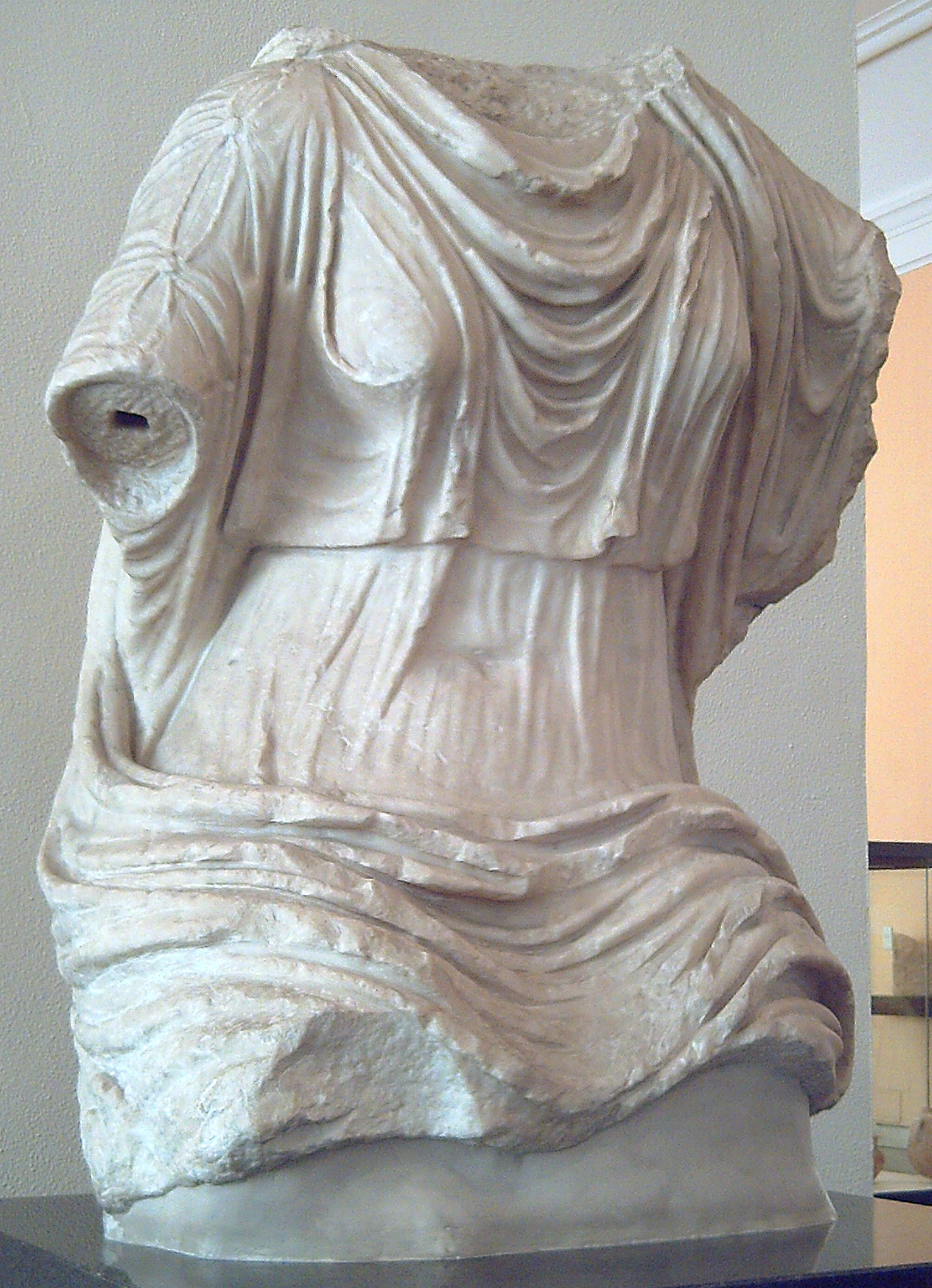
Roman marble torso from the 1st century AD, showing a woman's clothing

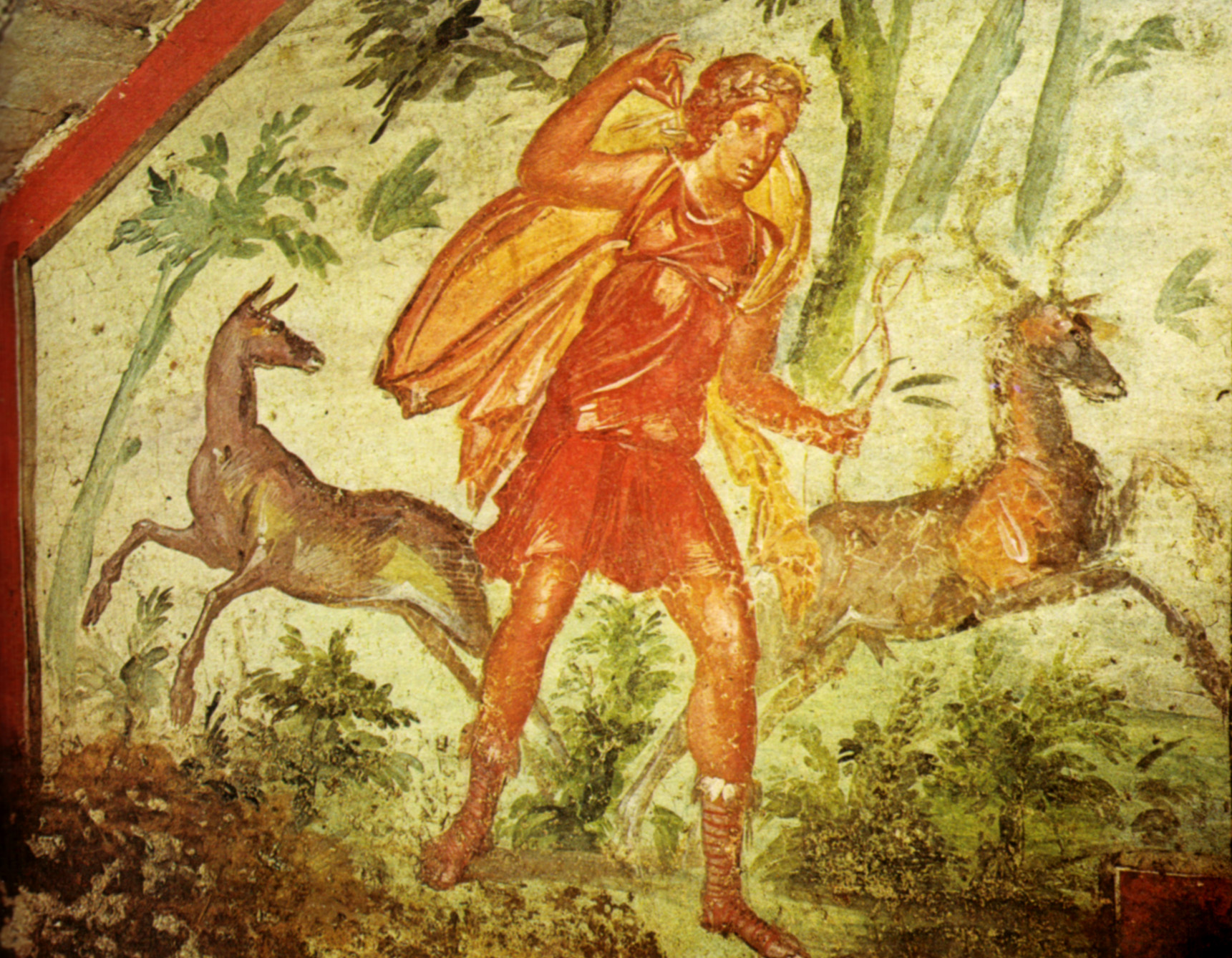
The goddess Diana hunting in the forest with a bow, and wearing the high-laced open "Hellenistic shoe-boots" associated with deities, and some images of very high status Romans. From a fresco in the Via Livenza Hypogeum, Rome, c. 350 AD

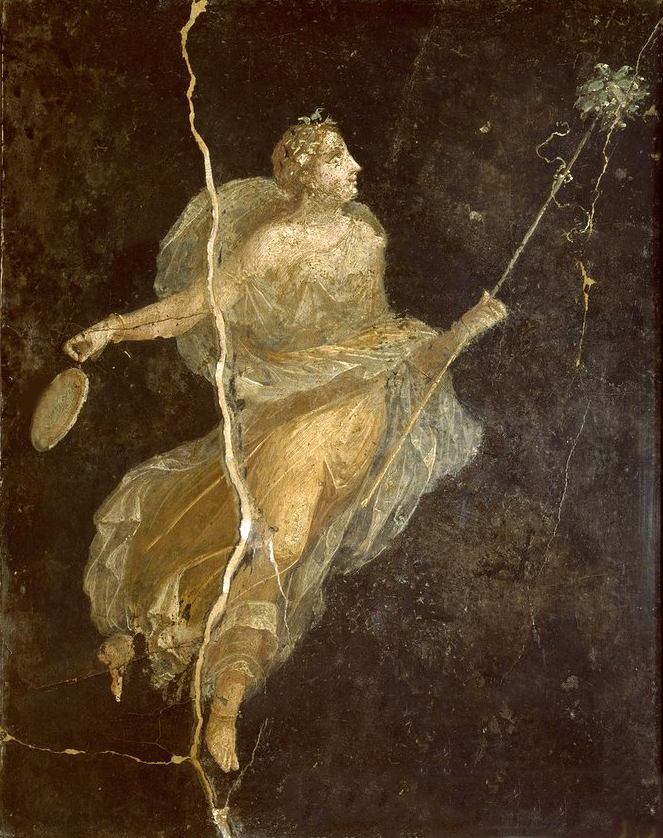
A maenad wearing a silk gown, a Roman fresco from the Casa del Naviglio in Pompeii, 1st century AD

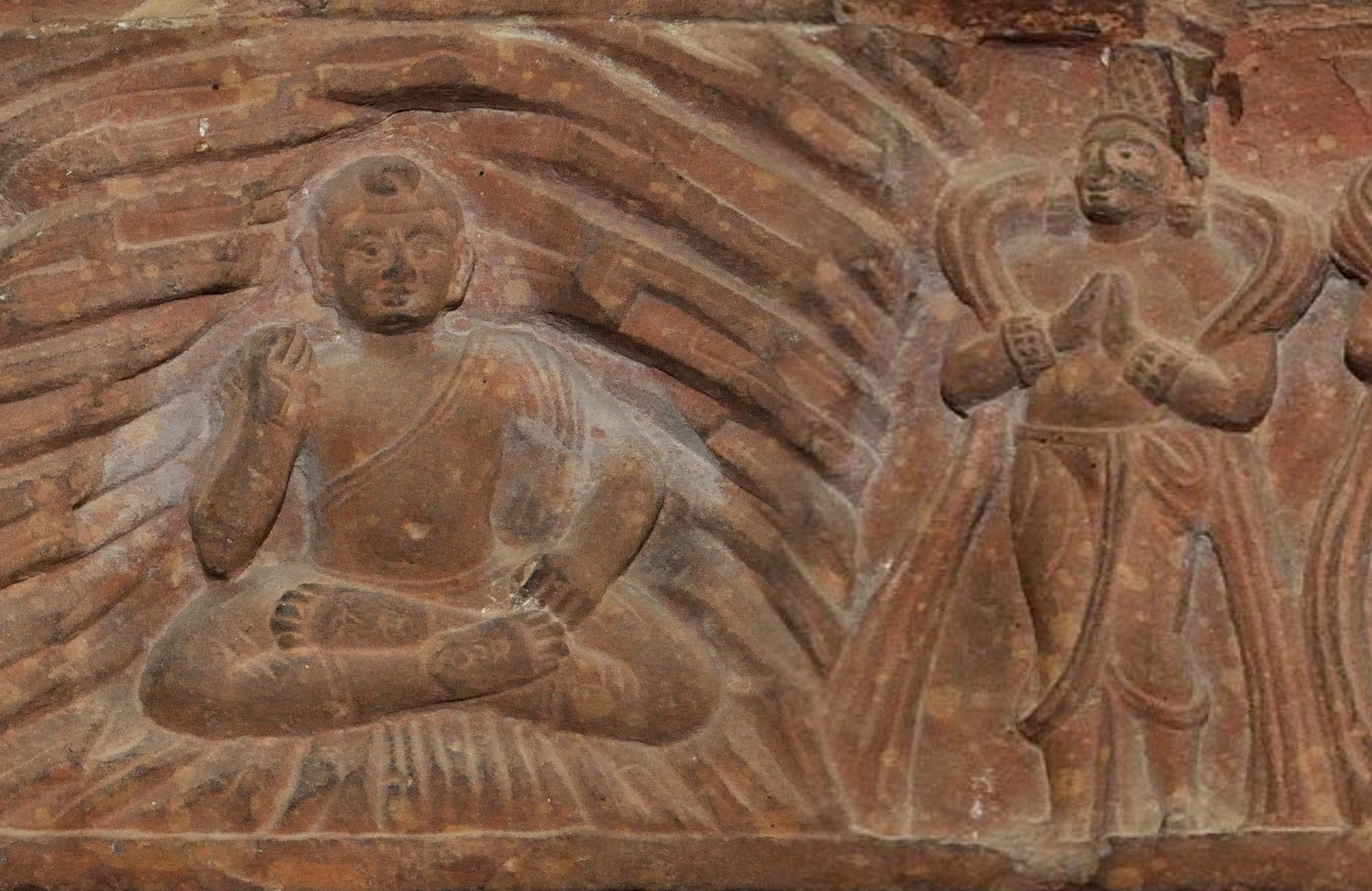
Uttariya and Antriya both are visible.

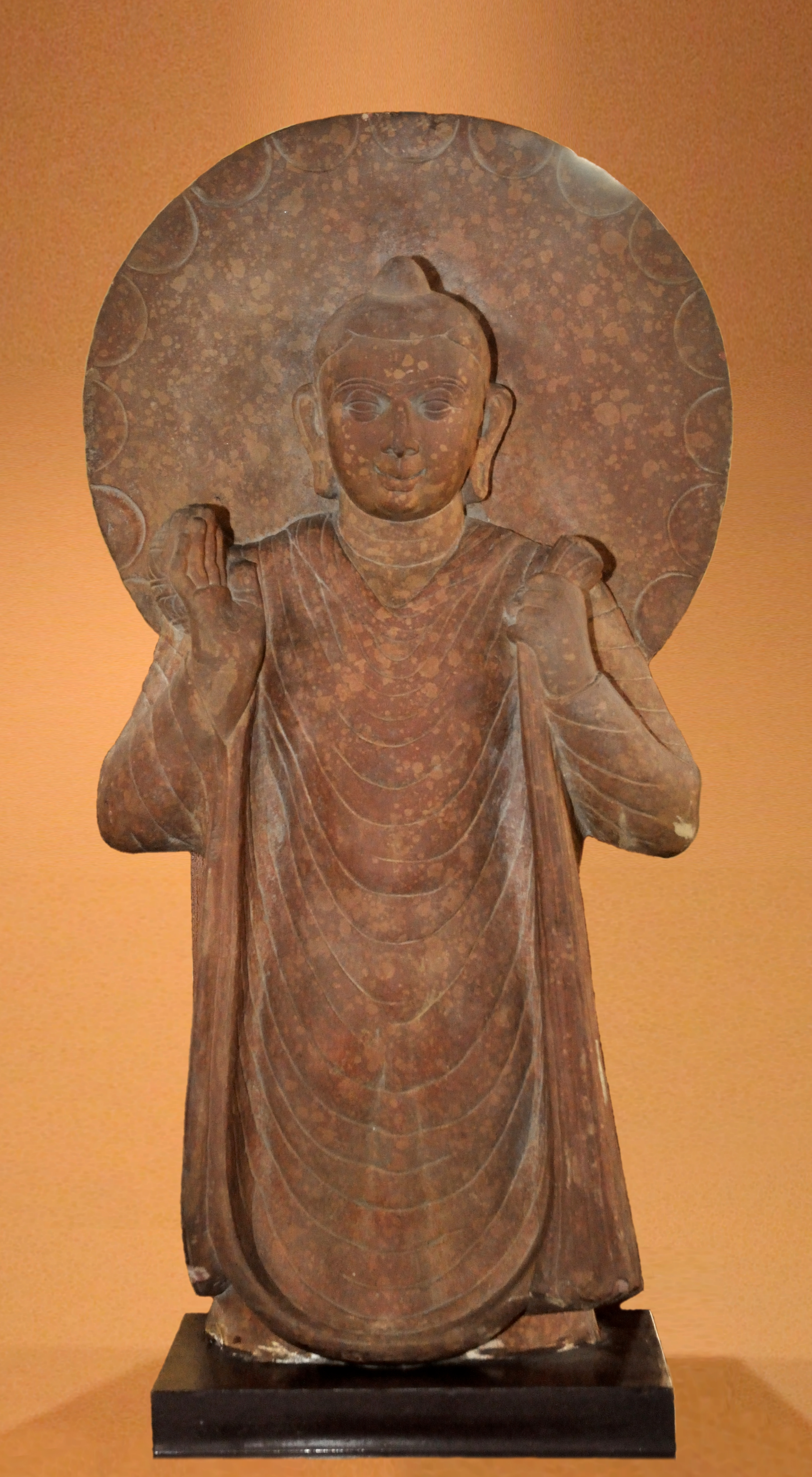
A Mathura standing Buddha in "Samghati" monastic dress, circa 2nd century CE, Mathura Museum

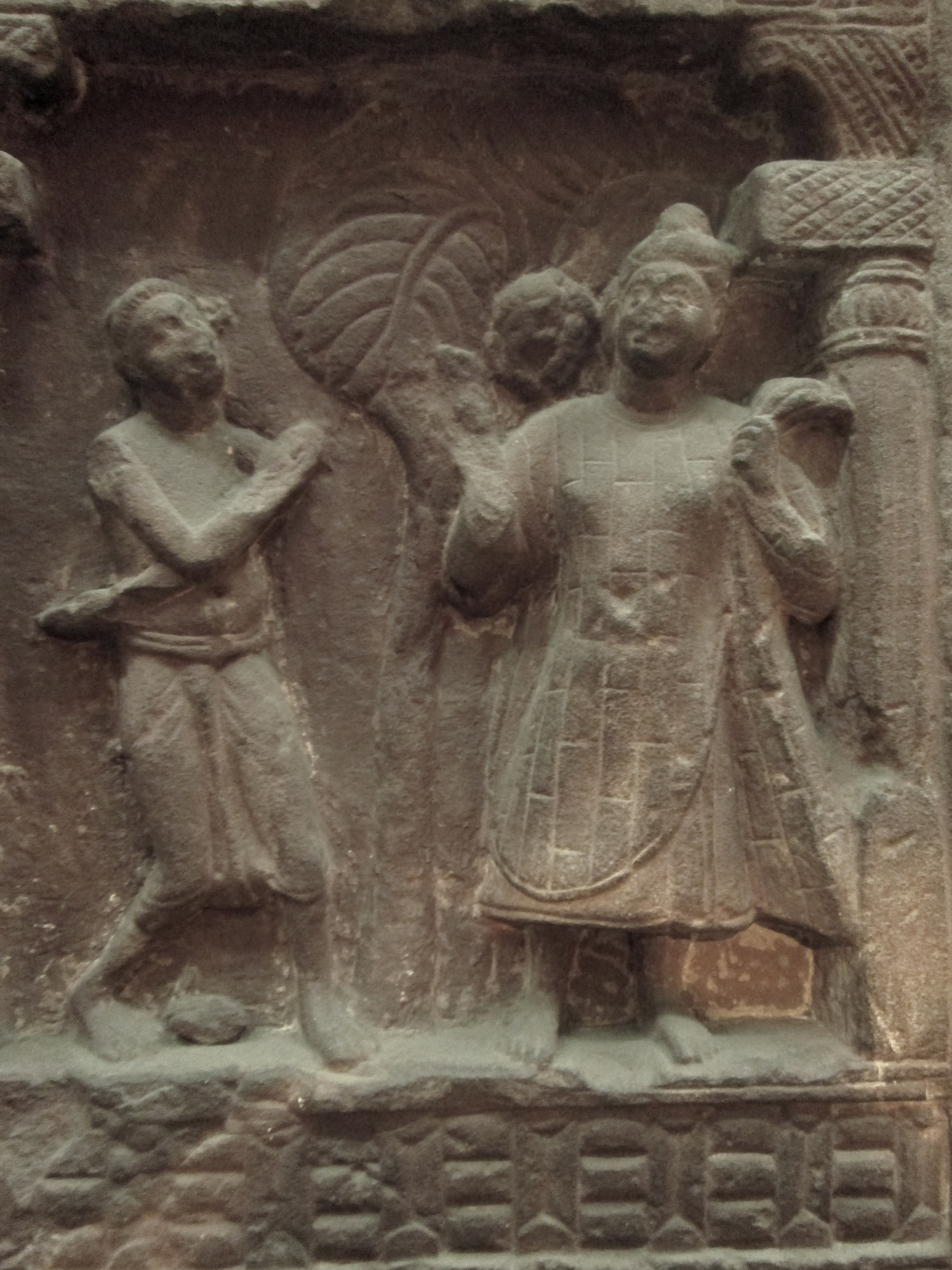
The Buddha in checkered monastic dress in the "Subjugation of Nalagiri", Bhutesvara Yakshis, 2nd century CE, Mathura.

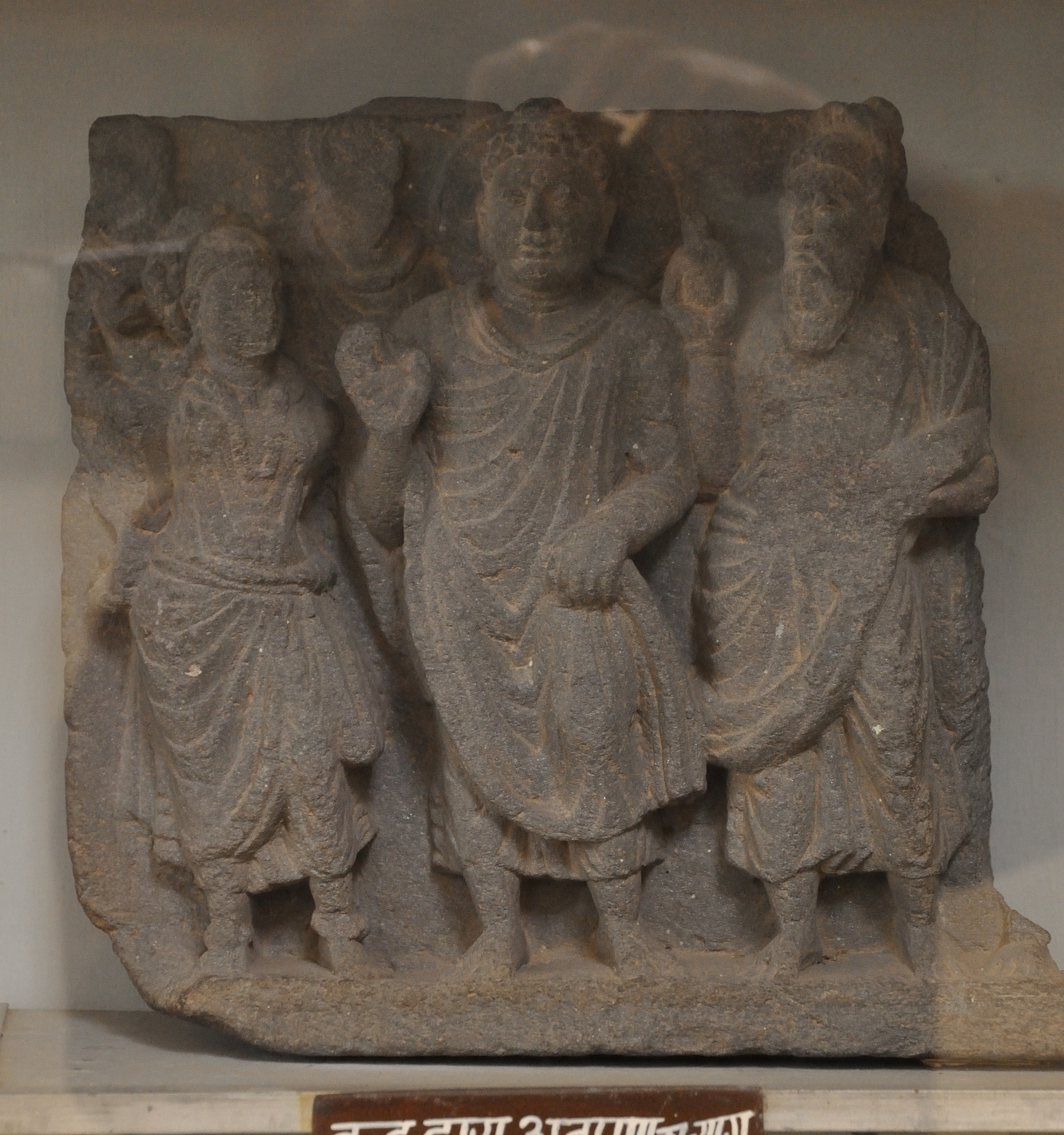
"Buddha Refuses Anupama", late Kushan

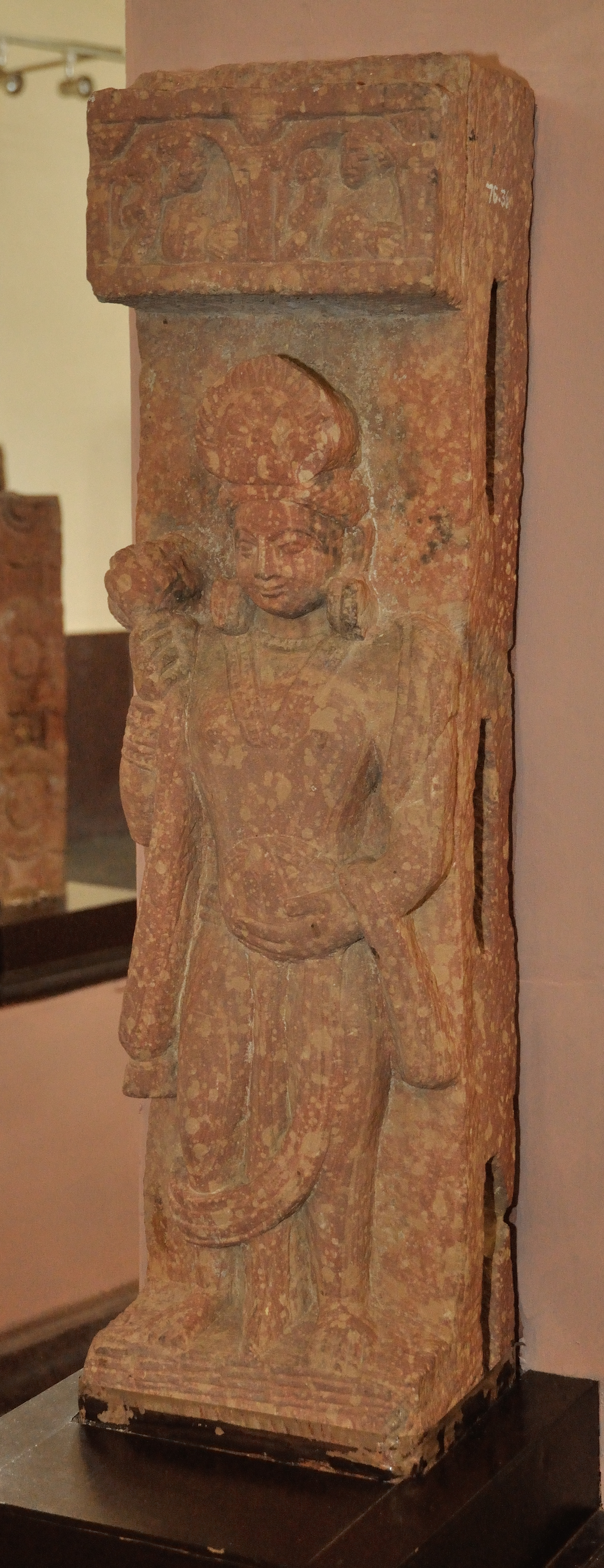
Bodhisattva Avalokitesvara holding lotus flower

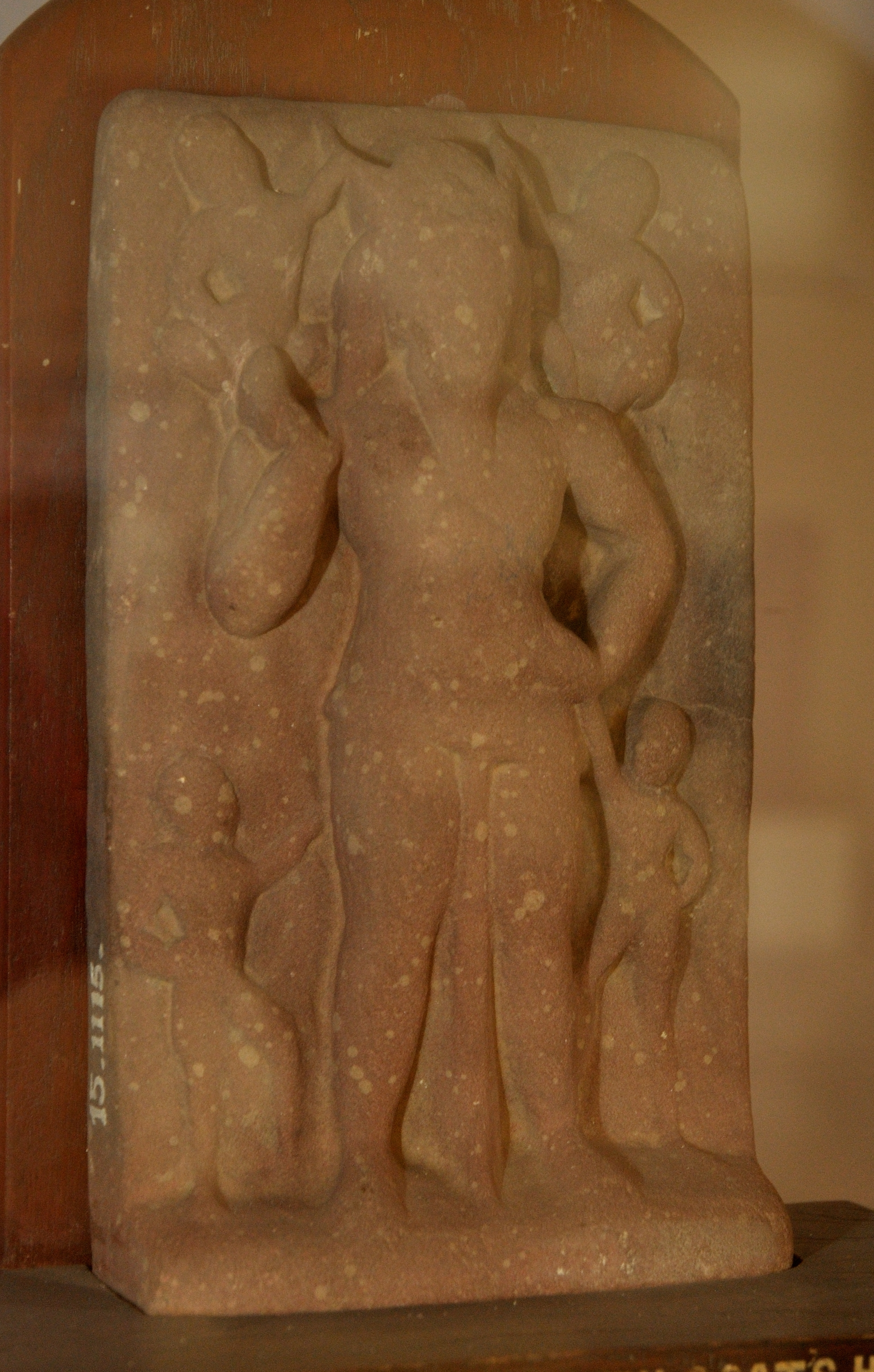
Naigamesha Jain god of Childbirth, 1st-3rd century CE.

== Present day use ==
=== Haute couture ===
Wrapped and draped dresses continue to inspire many fashion designers. Madame Grès was a well-known French couturier known for her draping art. Her most notable work are so-called floor-length draped Grecian goddess gowns.

== See also ==
- Drapery
- Piece goods
- Poshak
- History of clothing
- Clothing in ancient Rome
- Modesty
