= Piraeus Athena =

Bronze statue dated to the 300s BCE

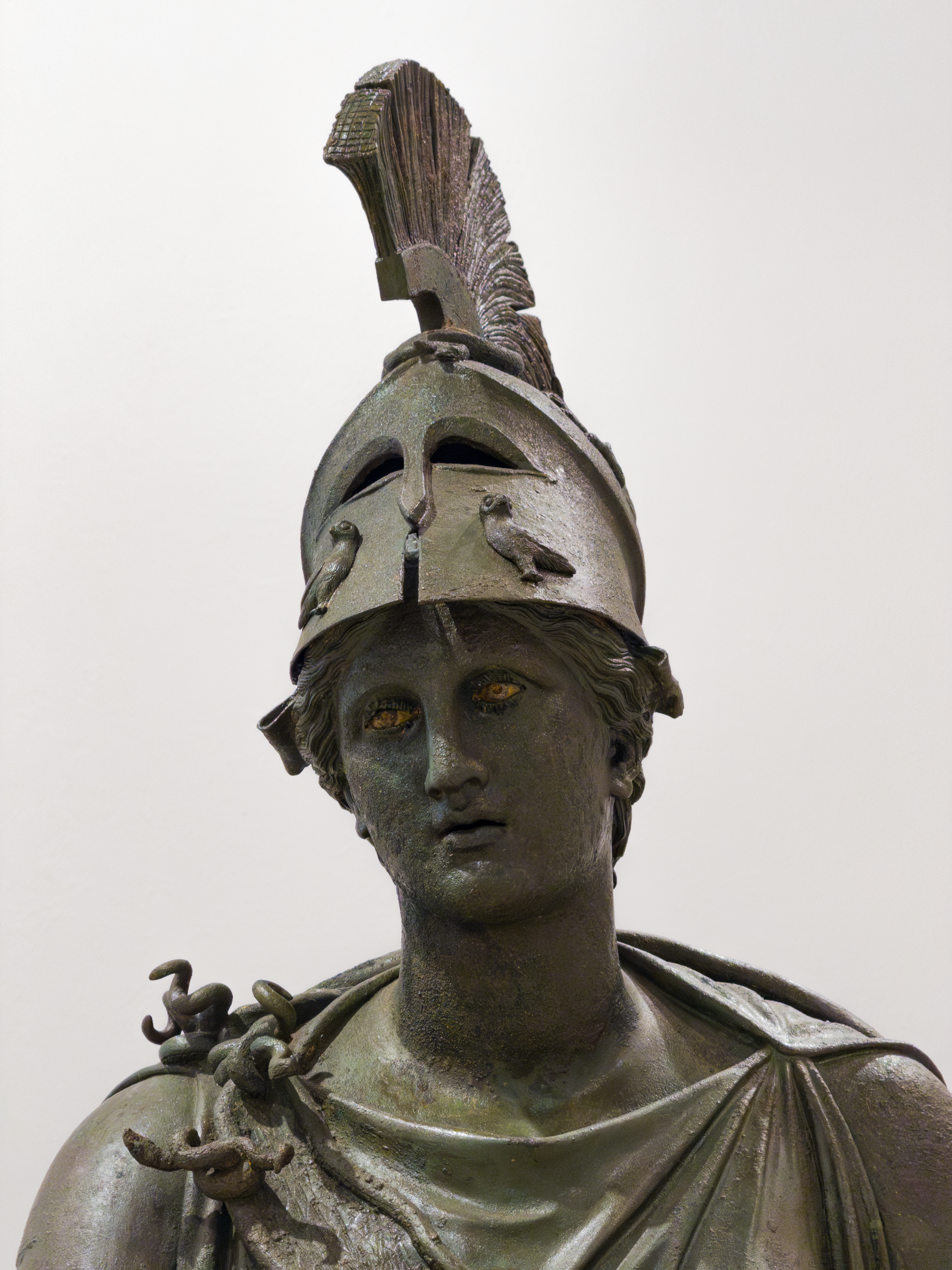
Portrait view of the Piraeus Athena

The Piraeus Athena is a Greek bronze statue dated to the fourth century BCE. Named for the city in which it was found, it currently resides in the Archaeological Museum of Piraeus.

== Description ==
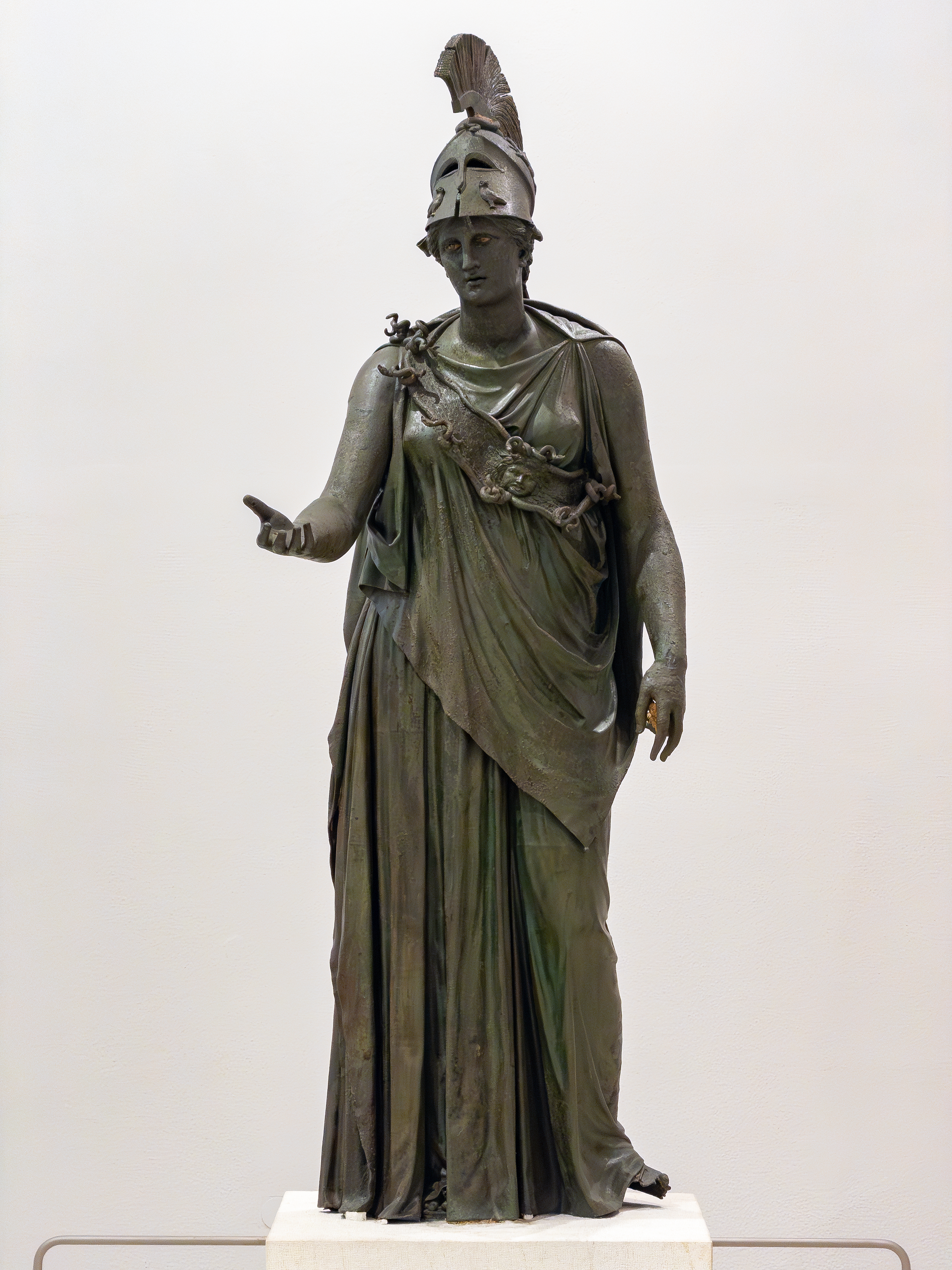
Piraeus Athena

The statue is an over-life sized representation of Athena, with a height of 2.35 meters (approximately 8 feet). She stands contraposto and wears a peplos that is open on the right side. She also wears a Corinthian helmet decorated with griffins on the sides of the helm and owls on the cheek pieces; the crest of the helmet has a serpent wrapped around its base. An aegis is strapped diagonally across her torso, which has a miniature Gorgon's head on it along with a border of snakes. The aegis' small size indicates that it is likely to be a marker of Athena's identity rather than an actual piece of armament. The position of the lower right arm, reached out and palm up, indicates that she was originally holding something. Possibilities as to what it could have been include an owl held out in the hand, a small statue of Nike, or an offering bowl. The idea that the figure could have been an owl, however, is considered unlikely by Olga Palagia, based on the fact that no contemporary statues of a standing Athena show her holding an owl. Her left arm is posed to hold a spear. The cloth of the peplos appears heavy, as evidenced from the deep cloth lines in the sculpture. The attention to detail at the back of the statue and her slight stoop suggest a possibility that she was designed to be placed on a central pedestal rather than against a wall.

The Piraeus Athena has been determined to be an original, and currently the only existent statue thought to be based on it is the Athena Mattei currently in the Louvre. The position of the right arm on the Louvre statue, however, is different than that of the Piraeus Athena.

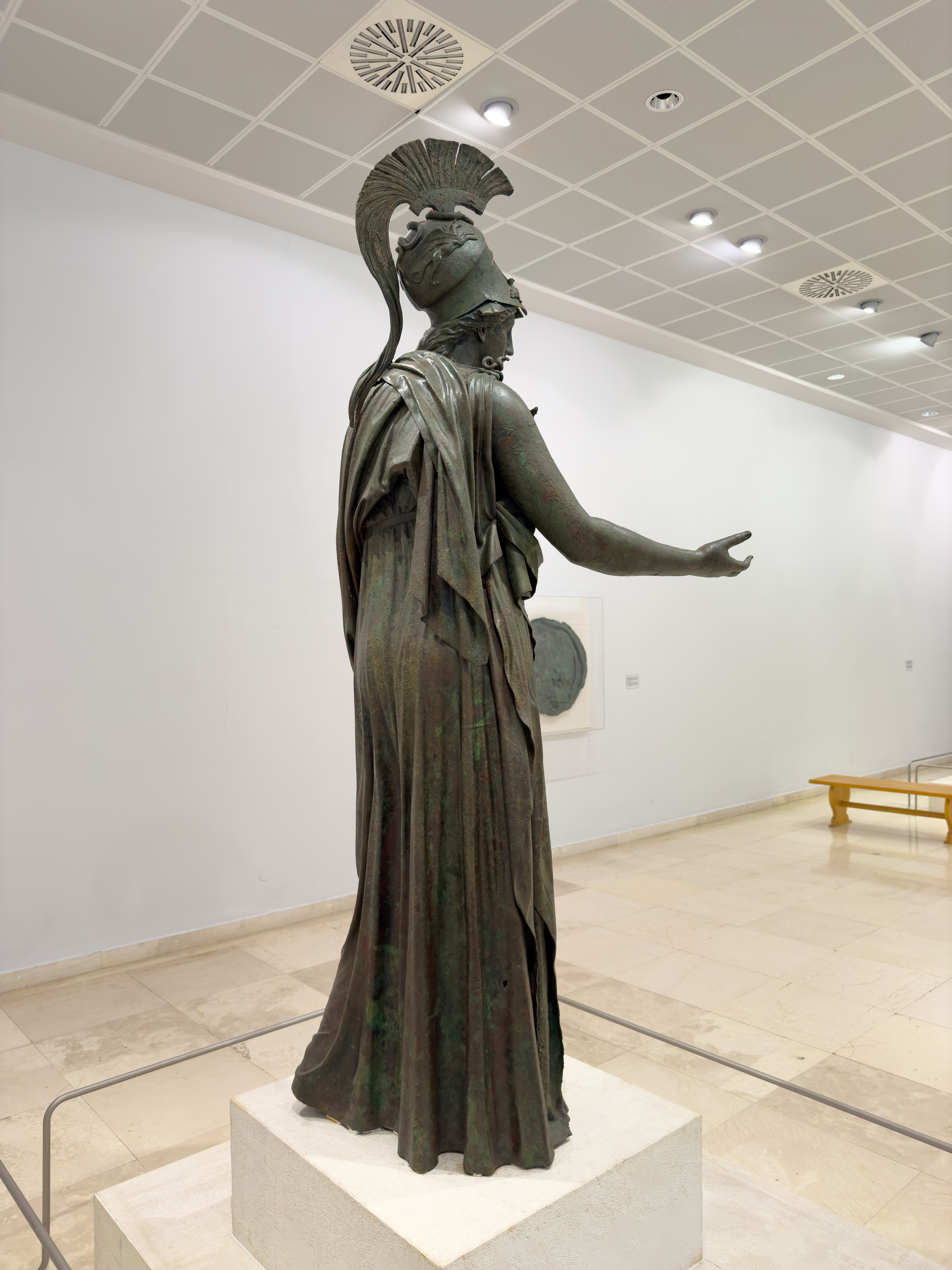
Side view of Piraeus Athena

== Discovery ==
The Piraeus Athena was discovered in 1959 by workers who were drilling underground to install pipes. The excavation of the site was led by John Papademitriou, head of the Greek Archaeological Service, and Mastrokostas Euthymios, the Epimelete of Attica. The excavations uncovered an ancient warehouse that had been burned down, which contained two groups of statues and other artefacts. Athena was found along with a not-quite-life-size bronze statue of Artemis, a large, bronze tragic mask, two marble herms, two bronze shields, and a small marble statue of Artemis Kindyas. The room the statue was found in was close to the main harbour of Piraeus, and the statues appeared to be packed and ready to be shipped when the warehouse burnt down. The entire collection is now known as the Piraeus Bronzes.

There are several theories as to why the statue would have been prepared for shipping. The first is based on the fact that the city of Piraeus was captured by Sulla in 86 BC. This would suggest that the statues were being shipped in order to save them from the Roman attack. This in turn indicates that the original intended location of the statue may have been either in Piraeus itself or locations in its vicinity, including the port of nearby Athens.

Other scholars, however, believe that the statue may have come from Delos. This identification is based on the fact that three of the statues found with the Piraeus Athena were of Artemis, who was believed to have been born at Delos. Further evidence for this suggestion is the capture of Delos by the Romans in 88 BC. If this was the case, the statues could have been part of the collection that Mithridates’ general had sent to Athens after their capture of the island. This theory is supported by the fact that a coin issued under King Mithridates VI was also found somewhere near the statues inscribed with a date equivalent to 87/86 BCE.

== Dating and Sculptor ==
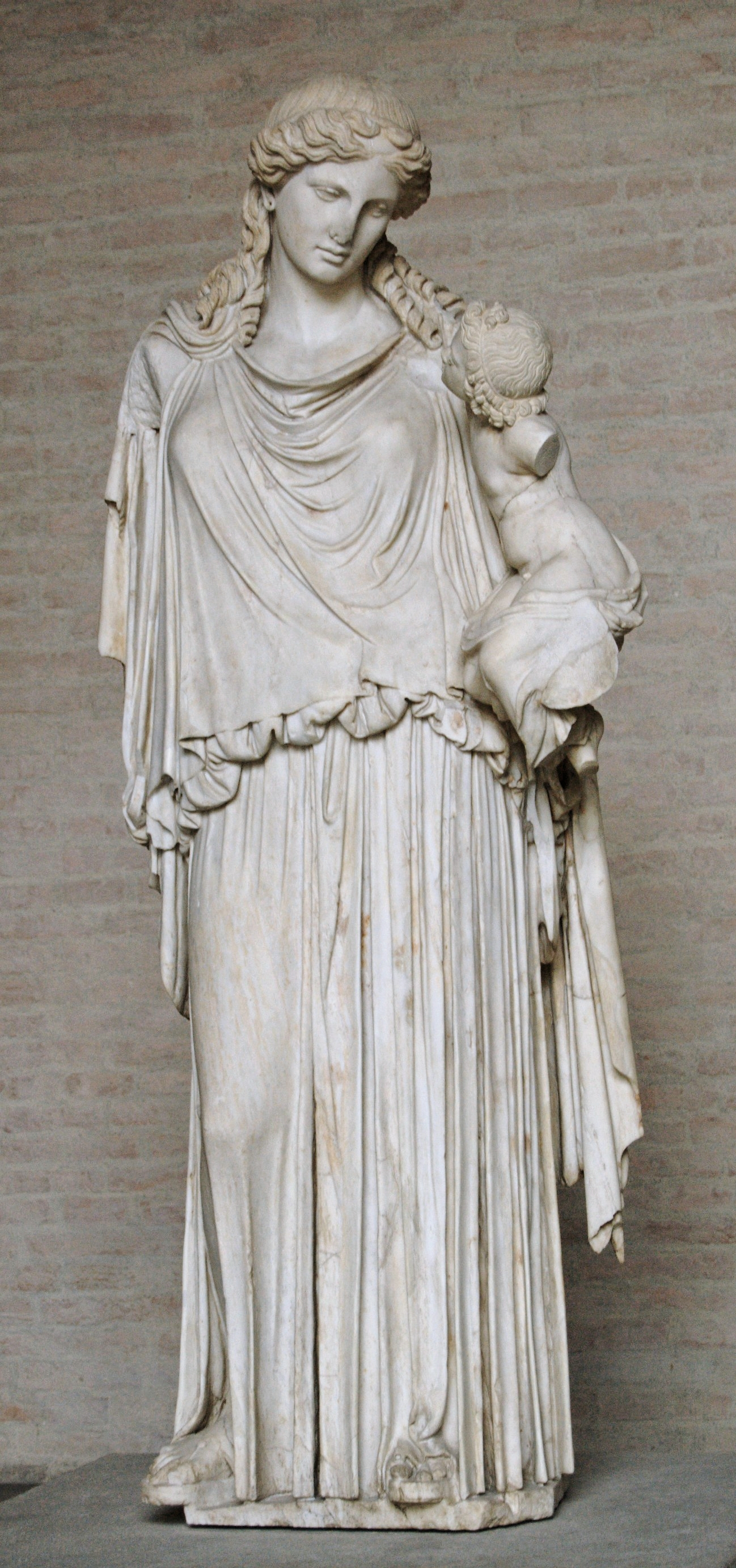
Marble copy of the statue of Eirene holding Ploutos. Currently in the Glyptothek in Munich

Several pieces of evidence date the creation of the statue to around the late 4th century. Firstly, several elements of the design of the statue reflect Greek 4th century BCE styles. One such element is the Corinthian helmet she wears - a style which became very popular in the fourth century. A second factor is the style of the peplos worn by the statue. It depicts a heavy material - a style that became fashionable later during the second half of the fourth century, further narrowing down the possible date range.

There are currently two theories as to the sculptor of the statue. According to Geoffrey Waywall, the drapery bears similarities to a statue of Eirene holding a baby Ploutos which is thought to have been made by Cephisodotus the Elder. This identification is based on the fact that Pausanias states that Cephisodotus made a statue of Peace and Wealth for the Athenians. Pliny the Elder states that Cephisodotus was active during the 102nd Olympiad, which is equivalent to 372-368 BC. This further tallies with the time period in which the Corinthian helmet and heavy peplos style were popular. Waywell identifies what he considers to be multiple areas of similarity between the two statues:

There are remarkable similarities in stance, general pose, proportions, treatment of face, hair, and limbs, and above all in the treatment of the drapery.

Waywell points to details similar between the two statues, such as the way the falls of the drapery are disturbed by the position of the supporting foot, and the way the lifted leg is revealed through the peplos and its interactions with her knee, outer calf and ankle. Compare also the smoothness of the modelling of the free leg through the drapery and the heavy fold which falls from the knee. He also argues that the two statues share the same style of severe vertical folds in the clothing at the side and back.

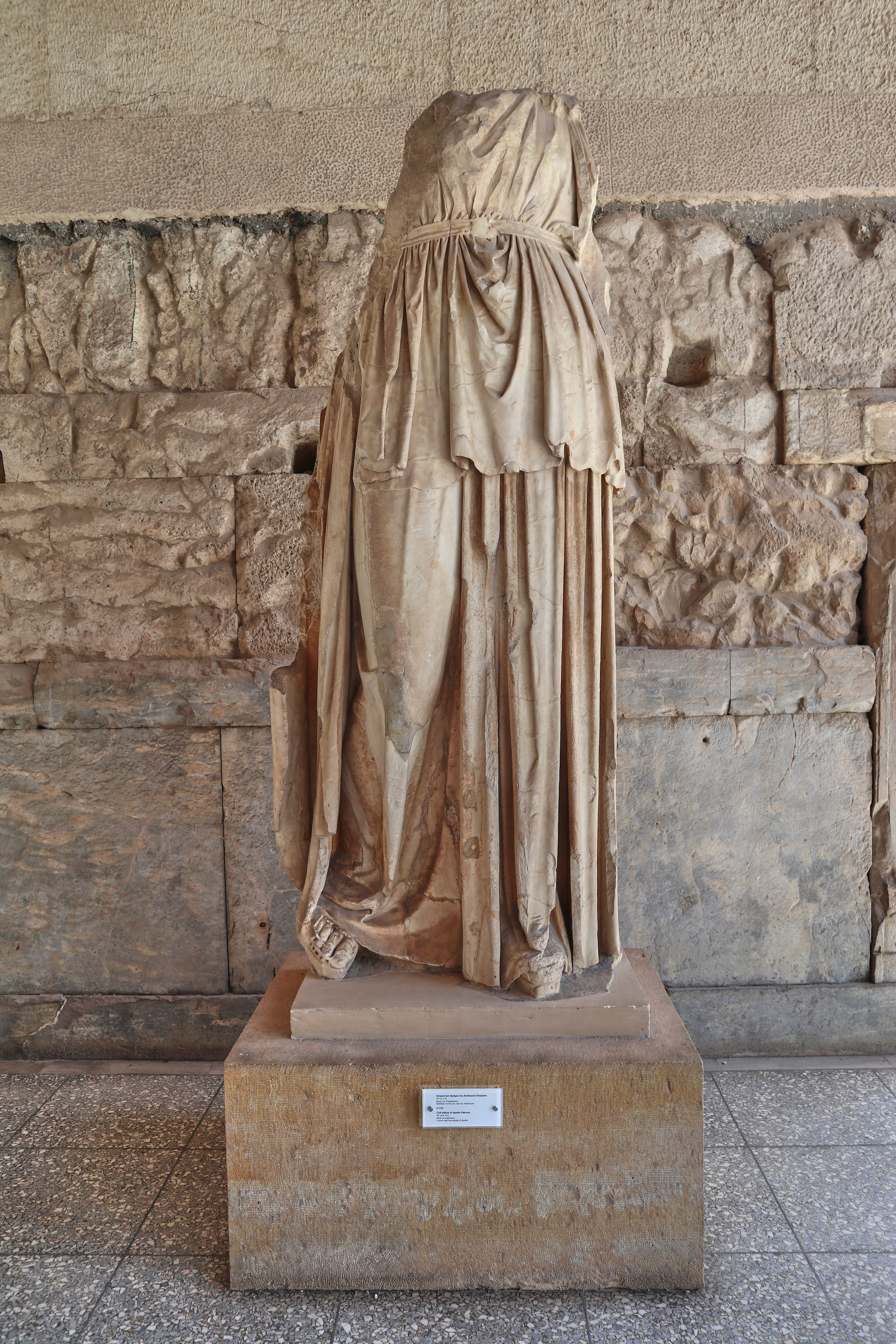
The Apollo Patroos from the Ancient Agora in Athens. A Roman copy in the Vatican Museum still retains the head.

Olga Palagia, however, argues that there is not much similarity between the style of the two statues:

The only stylistic similarity to the Athena is offered by the position of the bent leg not only drawn back but also set to the side, and by the folds of the skirt which form bands instead of fluting.

Palagia rejects the evidence of the similarities between the skirt of the statues, arguing that it is unreliable due to the way in which copyists often blurred the original rendering. Instead, she highlights several differences between the styles of the two statues. Firstly, the two statues' poses bear slight differences; secondly, there are further discrepancies between other elements of the clothing, such as the fact that the overfall of Athena's peplos hides most of her girdle from the front view, whereas the overfall of the peplos on Eirene has a short overfall that finishes just above the girdle, leaving the kolpos visible.

Instead of Cephisodotus, Palagia suggests Euphranor as the sculptor, based on the similarity of the Piraeus Athena to the Apollo Patroos - another statue known to have been created by him. The two statues share stylistic similarities in how the skirt drapes over the bent leg and in the fullness of the faces. Further, both share the same type of stance - the raised arm is on the opposite side to the bent leg, though the bent leg and arm are the opposite between the two statues. Euphranor was active during the 104th Olympiad, equivalent to 364-361 BC, and thus also fits within the time frame afforded by the popularity of the Corinthian helmet and heavy drapery.

== Sources ==
- Mattusch, Carol C. (1996). Classical bronzes: the art and craft of Greek and Roman statuary. Cornell University Press.
- Neer, Richard T. (2012). Greek Art and Archaeology: A new history, c.2500 - c.150 BCE. New York : Thames & Hudson.
- Palagia, Olga (1973). "Euphranoros techne". Athens Annals of Archaeology. 6: 323–329.
- Palagia, Olga (1980). Euphranor. Brill.
- Pedley, John G. (2012). Greek art and archaeology. Prentice Hall.
- Pausanias (1918). Description of Greece. Translated by Jones, W. H. S. Harvard University Press.
- Pliny the Elder (1855). The Natural History. Translated by Bostock, John. Taylor and Francis.
- Richter, Gisela (1954). Catalogue of Greek sculptures. Harvard University Press.
- Steinhauer, Georgios (2007). "The Piraeus bronze statues". In Valavanis, Panos (ed.). Great Moments in Greek Archaeology. Getty Museum. pp. 100–110.
- Vanderpool, Eugene (1960). "News Letter from Greece". American Journal of Archaeology. 64 (3): 265–271. doi:10.2307/502466. JSTOR 502466. S2CID 245265220.
- Waywell, G. B. (1971). "Athena Mattei". The Annual of the British School at Athens. 66: 373–382. doi:10.1017/S0068245400019274. S2CID 246245201.

== Bibliography & Further Reading ==
- Dafas, Kosmas A. (2019). Greek Large-Scale Bronze Statuary: The Late Archaic and Classical Periods, Institute of Classical Studies, School of Advanced Study, University of London, Bulletin of the Institute of Classical Studies, Monograph, BICS Supplement 138 (London).
