= Manta esperancera =

Shawl of the Canary Islands

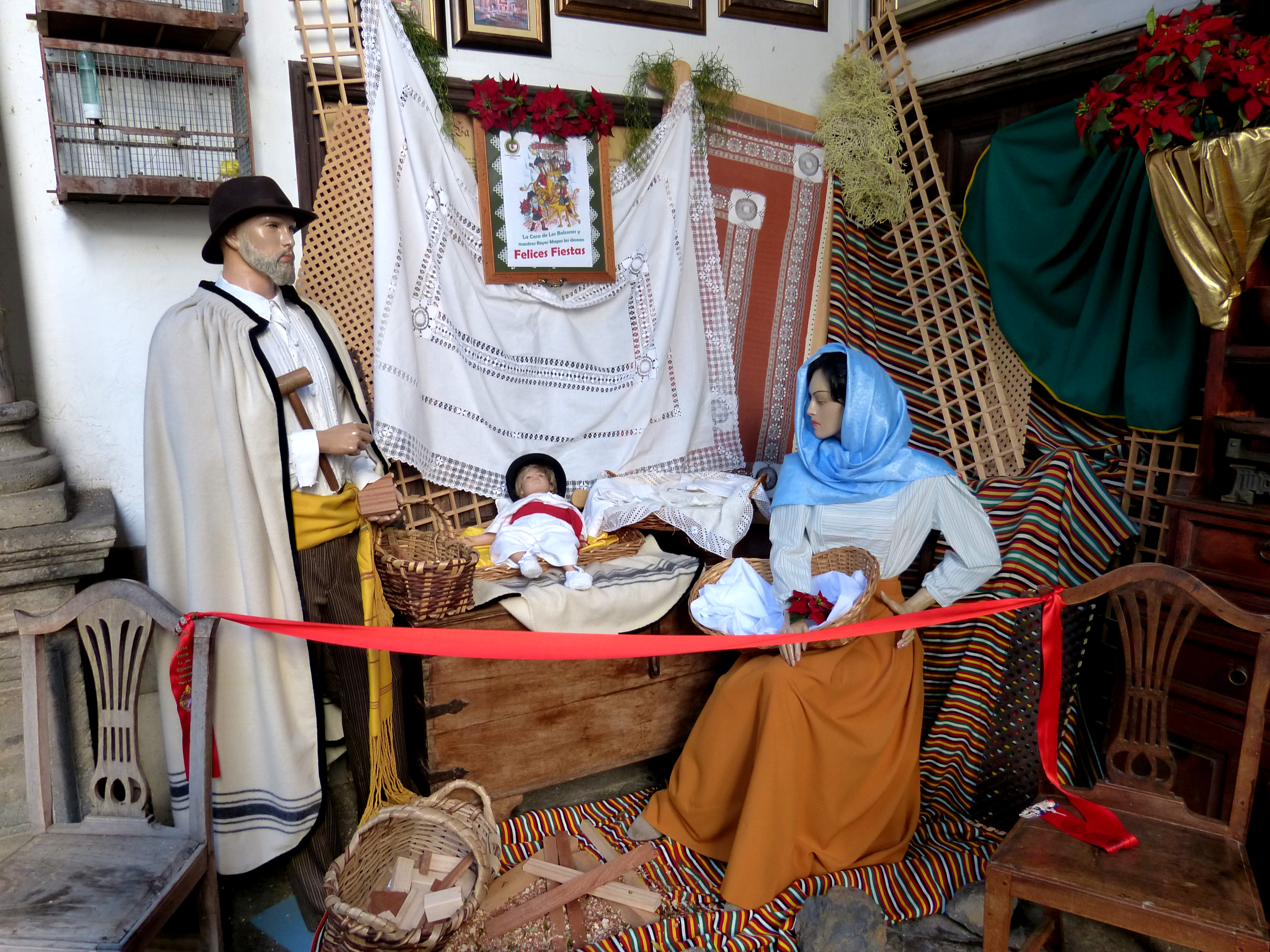
- Nativity scene in La Orotava (Tenerife). The figure representing Saint Joseph wears a manta esperancera.
- Type: Cape
- Material: Wool
- Place of origin: Tenerife, Spain

The manta esperancera is a traditional male cape worn by farmers in Tenerife, Canary Islands, Spain. It is always beige. At the bottom It has a series of alternating stripes with beige background of blue hues.

== History ==
The manta esperancera originated in high, wet and wooded areas of the island of Tenerife. They were originally wool blankets imported from England. Later they became used as men's field clothing. The manta esperancera began in the town of La Esperanza, as this is the place where the weather made the manta esperancera the most useful.

Alternatively, the manta esperancera could be an evolution of the Tamarco, a winter garment that was worn by the Guanche autochthones of the Canary Islands. Over time, the manta esperancera has become a symbol of the traditional clothing of the Canary Islands. It is now traditionally worn by several folk groups of the islands including Los Sabandeños and Los Gofiones.
