= Mattei Athena =

Sculpture of Athena

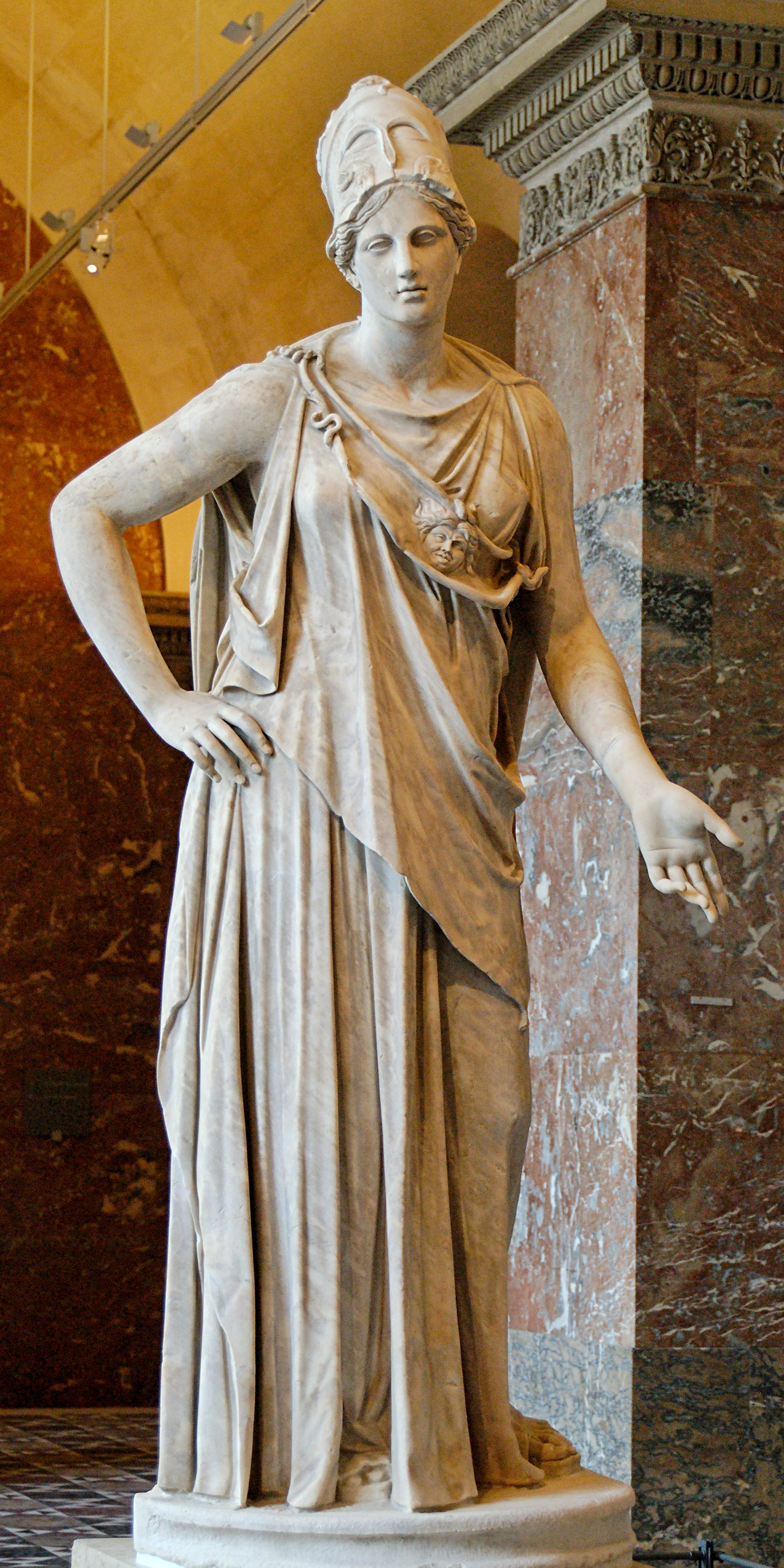
- Medium: Marble
- Dimensions: 230 cm × 98 cm (91 in × 39 in)
- Location: Louvre Abu Dhabi

The Mattei Athena is a Parian marble sculpture dating to the 2nd or 1st century BC. It is considered by scholars to be a copy of the Piraeus Athena. It was purchased by the Louvre in 1824 and is currently on exhibit at the Louvre Abu Dhabi.

== Structure ==
The Mattei Athena and the bronze Piraeus Athena are almost identical in regards to their size, stance, and dress. The statue has several areas of damage, including to the head, which had been broken at the top of the neck. The nose is a modern restoration along with several other areas of the face. The Mattei Athena's left hand and wrist are also part of a modern restoration, but it is considered likely that they matched the Piraeus Athena originally.

The position of the right hand and arm differ between the sculptures — the Piraeus Athena's right arm extends forward with her palm up, while the Mattei Athena's arm is bent and her hand sits on her hip. This difference is attributed by scholars to economic and technical reasons. To carve the right arm extending forward would have required more marble, and the arm might not have been strong enough to hold something, as it is believed the Piraeus Athena originally did. The Corinthian helmet also differs slightly between the Piraeus Athena and the Mattei Athena, with the cheek-pieces of the Mattei Athena's helmet depicting ram's heads rather than the owls.
