= Aprapadina =

Kind of lower garment

Aprapadina (Āprapadīna, आप्रपदीन) was a lower garment for women in ancient India. The garment was long, reaching all the way to the toes.

== Etymology ==
As Aṣṭādhyāyī elucidates, the garment was long and touched the forepart of the feet. Aprapadina is a Sanskrit word that means "reaching to the feet." Thus, it is called that.

== Depictions ==
Aprapadina appears in depictions of Indian sculptures and paintings. For example, worshipping Yakshini (in fragments of railing post, Mathura, 2nd century) is described as wearing an Aprapadina. The Yaksi's hands are folded in front of her (in anjali mudra), and she is draped in a long shawl over her shoulders, signifying that she is engaged in worship. A long, transparent skirt (Aprapadina) is held in place by a hip-girdle (mekhala) made of four beaded strings and a clasp in the front that keeps it in place.

In a similar manner, Aprapadina has been pictured in a Vijayanagara painting.

"Towards the farthest end is a woman dressed in a lower garment of the aprapadina type that reaches the ankle and holding a staff vetra- danda."

== See also ==
- Antariya
