= Bhutesvara Yakshis =

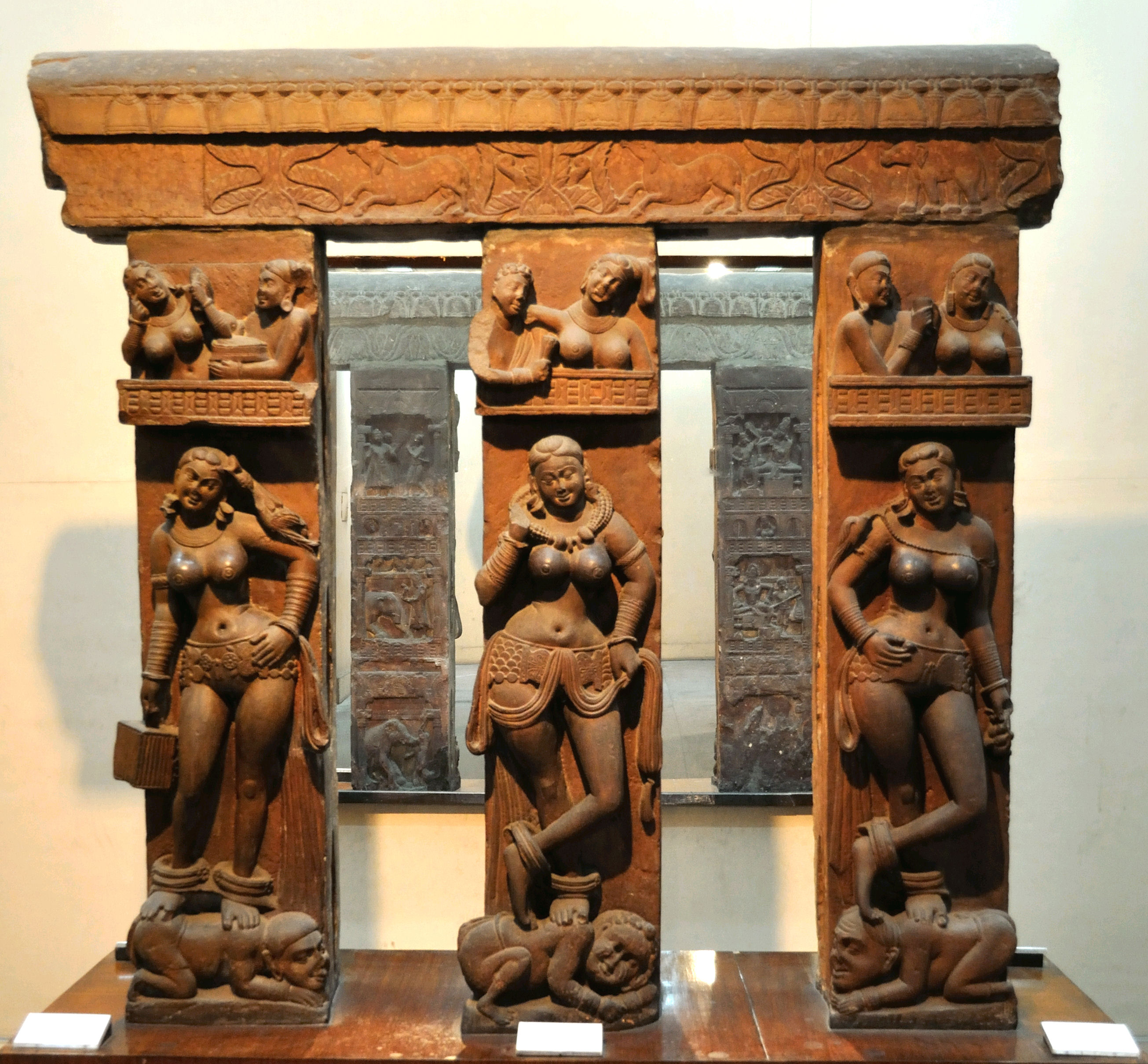
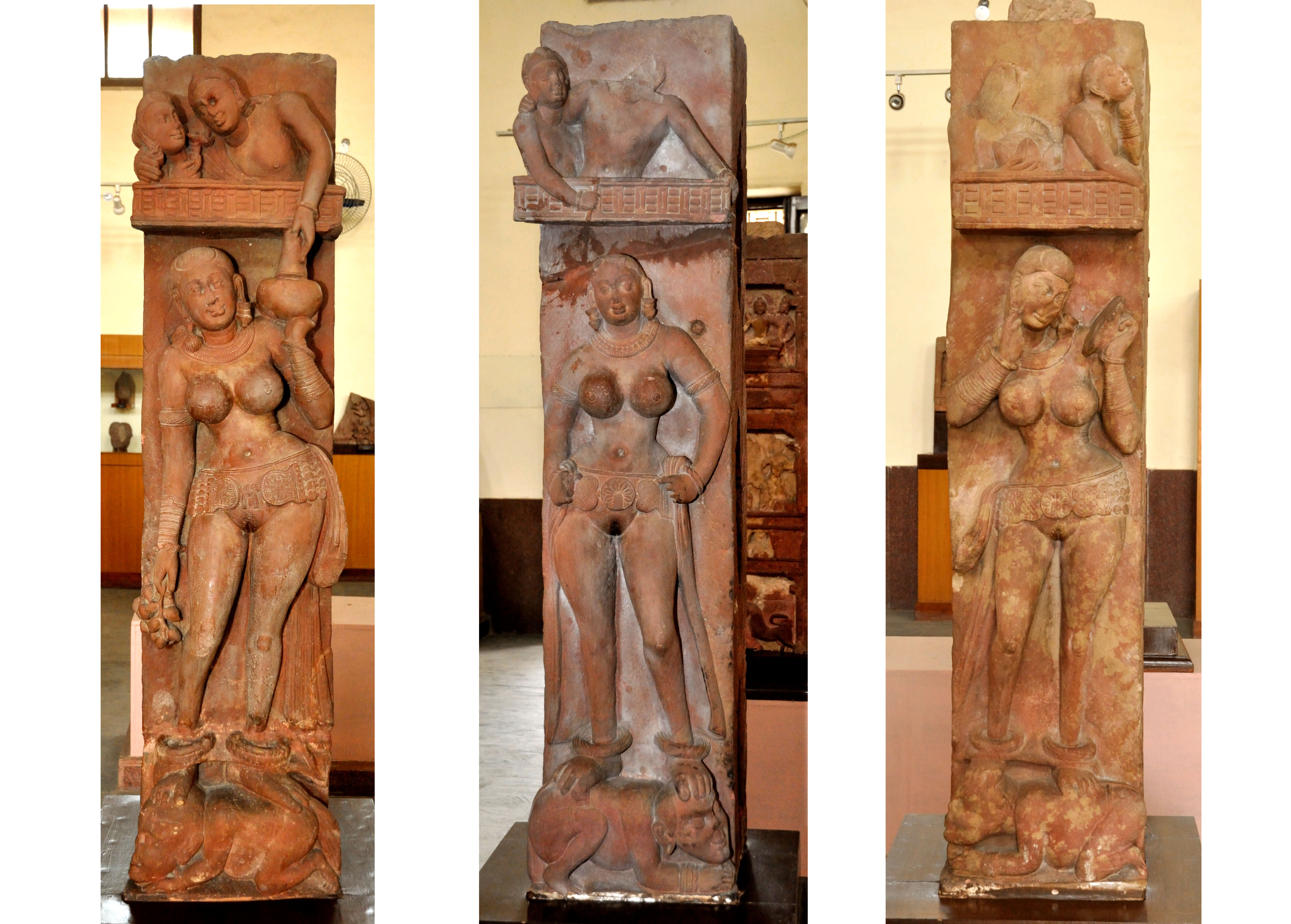
- Bhutesvara Yakshis, Mathura, 2nd century CE. The Buddhist reliefs of the back of the pillars are visible in the mirror behind. Indian Museum, Kolkata. The Bhutesvara Yakshis in the Mathura Museum.
- Material: Red sandstone
- Period/culture: 2nd century CE
- Discovered: 27°36′00″N 77°39′00″E
- Place: Mathura, India.
- Present location: Indian Museum, Kolkata, India. Also Mathura Museum, Mathura

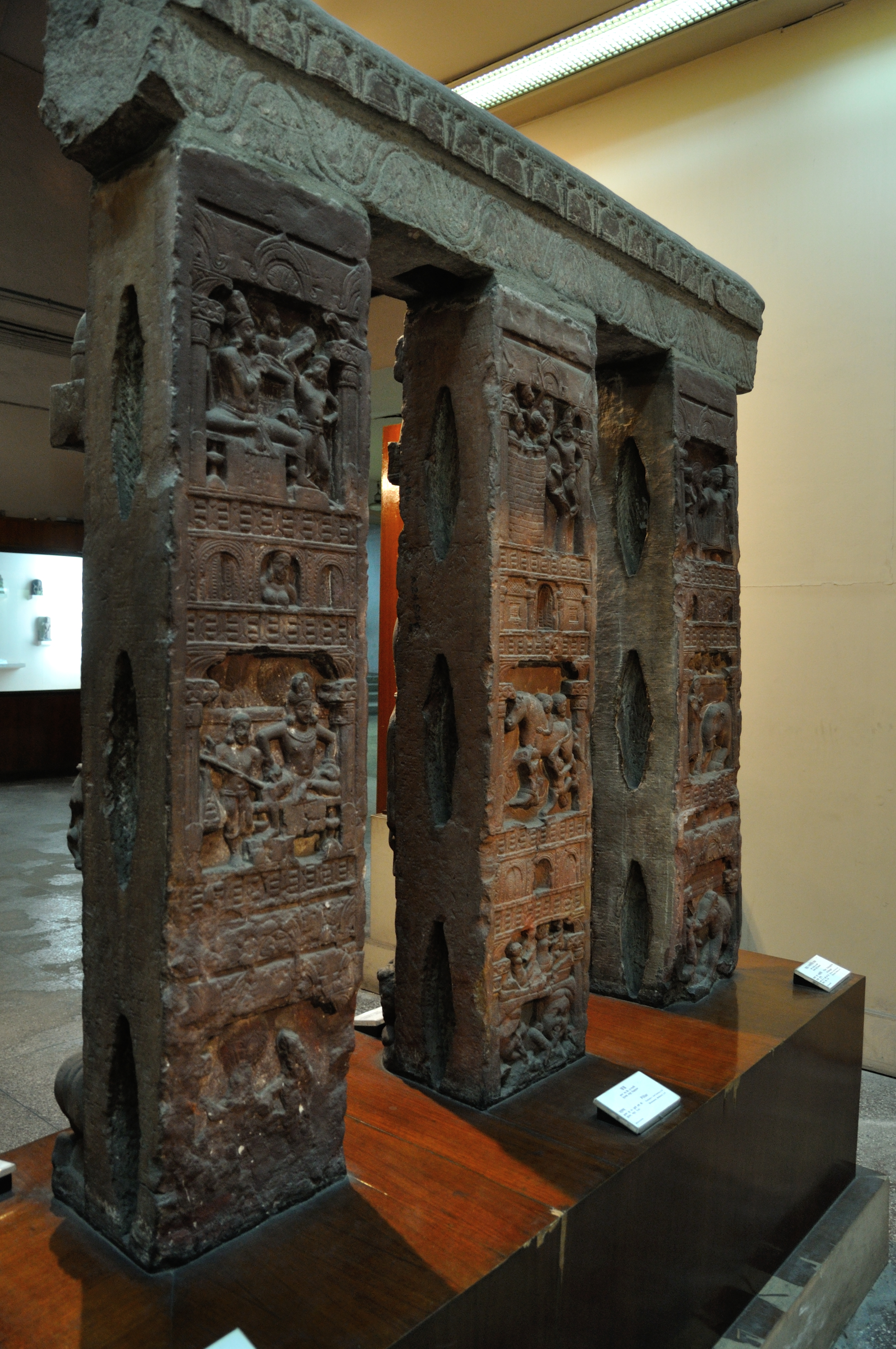
Back of the pillars with Buddhist reliefs (Indian Museum, Kolkata). The holes for the cross-bars can be seen in the sides.

The Bhutesvara Yakshis, also spelled Bhutesar Yakshis, are a series of yakshi reliefs on a railing, dating to the 2nd century CE during the time of the Kushan Empire. The reliefs were found in the Bhuteshwar mound, around the remains of a Buddhist stupa, outside Mathura, and are now located in the Indian Museum in Kolkata, with three pillars, and three more pillars and one fragment (half of a pillar) in the Mathura Museum. They are an important example of Mathura art, of which these and other yakshi figures are "perhaps the best known examples".

The backs of the pillars contain reliefs with scenes from the life of the Buddha, and from Jataka tales about his previous lives.

The Bhutesar mound is one of a row of large mounds originally just outside the city of Mathura, but now well within the modern city. The important, mostly Jain, site of Kankali Tila was two mounds down.

== Front of the pillars ==
The pillars are four feet four inches tall and eleven inches wide, the figures therefore well under life-size. The Yakshis are seen standing on crouching figures of dwarves. Above the yakshis is a ledge, above which are a pair of figures shown from chest height up. These are couples of a male and a bare-breasted female, interacting in a variety of ways. A lintel carved with ornament runs above; this is a different piece of stone, which has been put back in place in the display in Kolkata. The sides of the pillars have slots for holding horizontal members, the whole making up a section of the type of railing usually found around stupas of this period, such as Sanchi or Amaravati Stupa. In the past the Kolkata display has included these.

This group of Yakshi figures is praised for the delicacy of their rendering, the absence of heaviness despite the plumpness of the figures, and their smiling and playful countenance. Compared to the earlier yakshis at Bharhut, Roy C. Craven finds these "more vivacious and Amazonian in nature, and their smooth, inflated volumptuousness gives them buoyancy and life. They seem about to spring from the backs of their supporting dwarfs ... [and] ... have the monumental frontality which is characteristic of Mathura sculpture".

Writing of these and other contemporary Mathura yakshi figures from railings, Benjamin Rowland finds:

a flamboyance and sensuality of expression surpassing anything known in the art of earlier periods. In their provocative and frank display of the beauties and delights of the courtesan's art, these reliefs mark the culmination of a tendency already noted in the carvings at Sanchi and Bharhut. Not only is there a thoroughly convincing suggestion of solidity of form, but the articulation of body and limbs is achieved with complete mastery... The question may well be asked: what is the purpose of such frankly sensuous figures on a Buddhist monument? The answer is that possibly they represent a pointed reference on the exterior of the sacred enclosure to the transitory life of pleasure, outside the peace of the world of Buddha; again, it may be that, like the mithunas of later Hindu art, they represent an allegory of the desirability of the soul's union with the divine in the forms of these beautiful dryads that so actively suggest the desirability of sexual union.

The Yakshis have varied attitudes, variations on the tribhanga (three bend) pose that was to become extremely popular in Indian art. One of them is seen holding a bird cage. Another one looks at herself in a mirror while adjusting a piece of earring. Yet another serves wine to the couple above and holds a grape. The yakshi in the half-pillar in Mathura holds a huge sword; possibly this relates to the various literary references to female royal bodyguards or harem guards. They are from the front completely naked apart from elaborate jewellery, but wear thin skirts, which most have gathered to one side, the hanging folds appearing on the flat background surface.

The couples above the yakshi are found in another Mathura set of railing pillars of similar date from Jaisinghpura, also in the Mathura Museum. Here only the heads appear. The dwarfish male figures the yakshis stand on seem rather cheerful, and instead of representing the usual evil figures stood on by Indian deities, may in this case represent yaksha lovers who have offended their mistress in some way; there are many literary references to men appeasing women by submitting in this way. They are also found in other Mathura yakshi pillars.

== History ==
The memoirs of Sir F. S. Growse, the District collector of the Mathura district, and founder in 1874 of the Mathura Museum, relate that in his time five of the pillars were "built into the verandah of a chaupal close by" the site. One had already been removed to Calcutta (Kolkata) by Alexander Cunningham, and Growse sent two more, leaving three for the Mathura Museum "where possibly they may now have been placed".

Five of the pillars, in 1897.

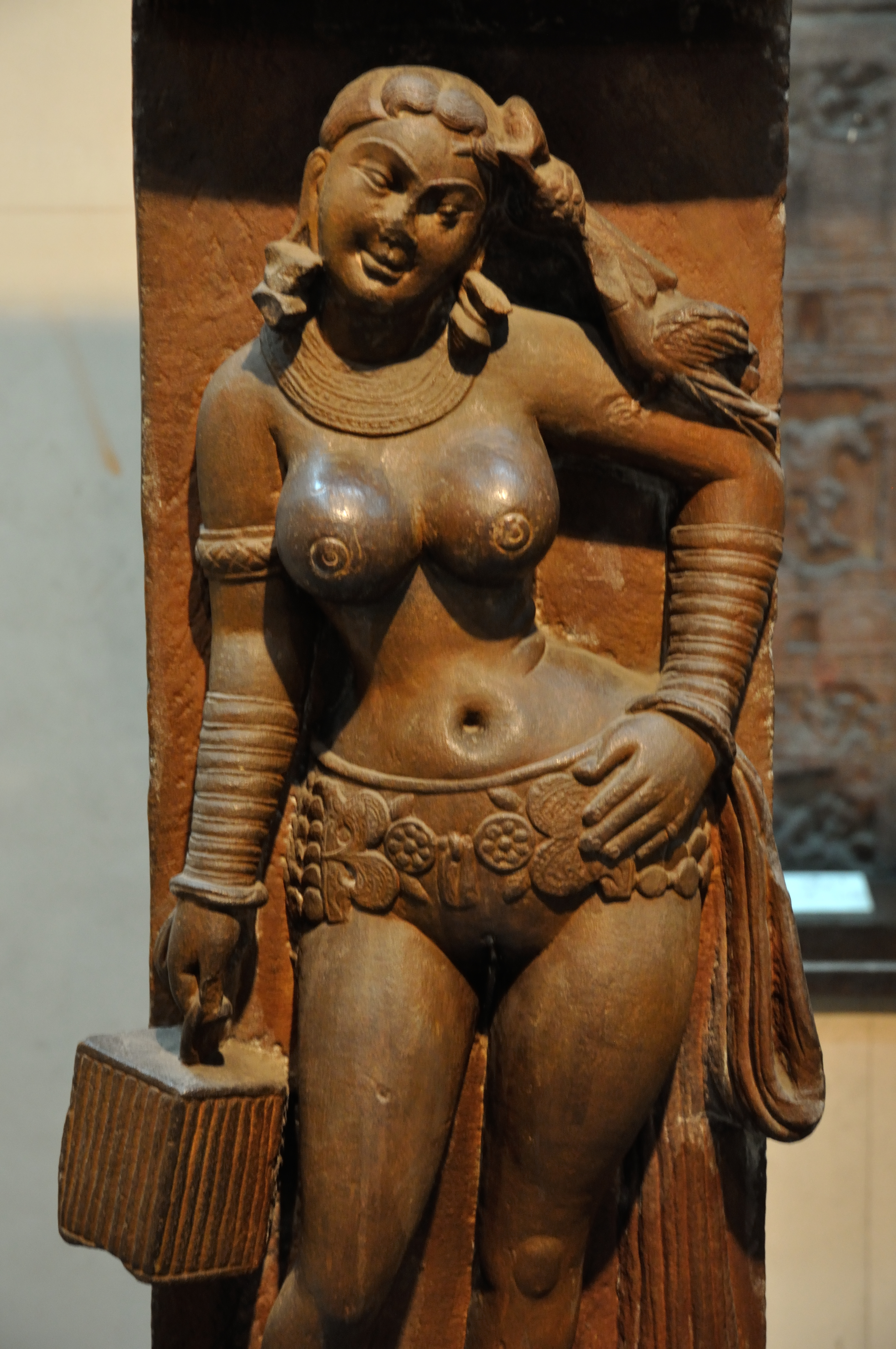
Lady holding a bird cage.

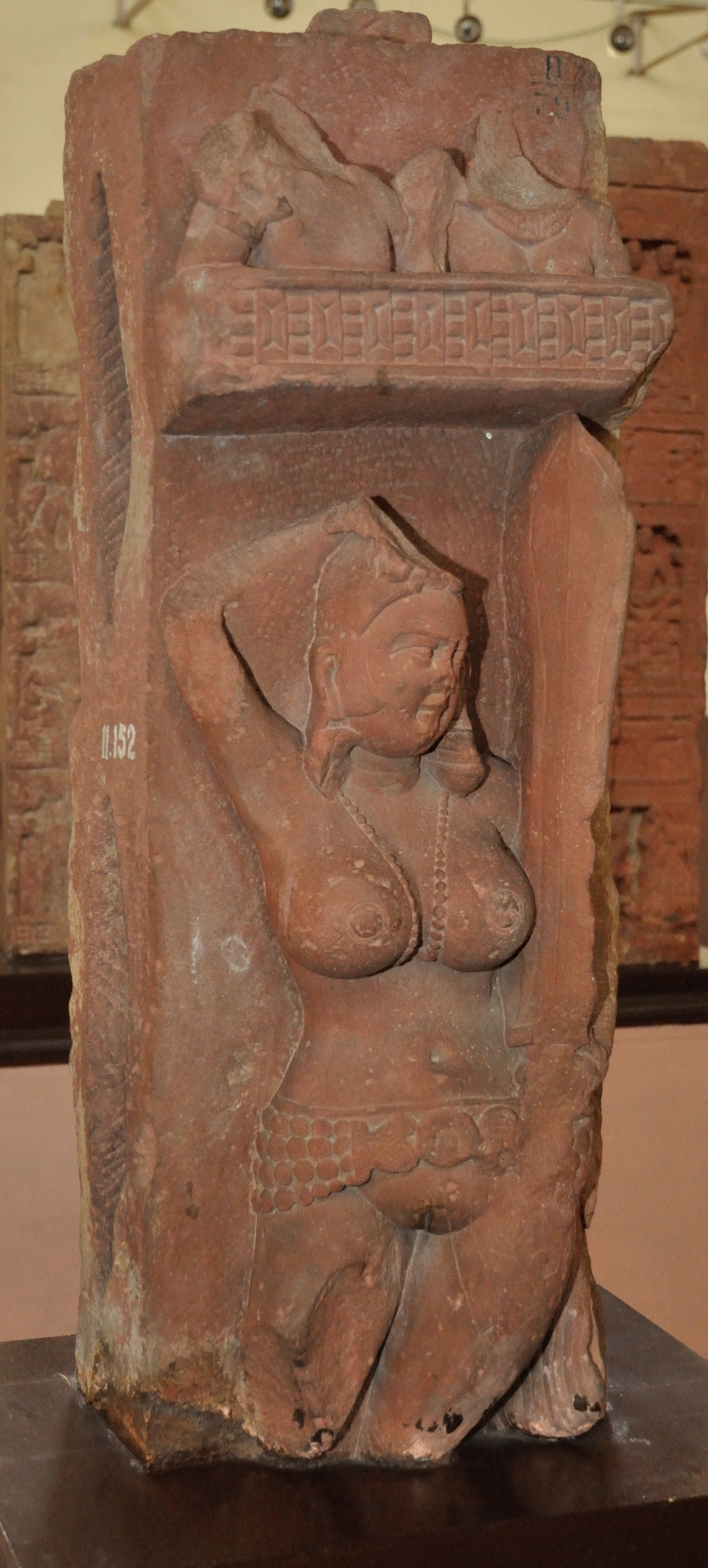
Yakshi with sword, the half-pillar in Mathura.

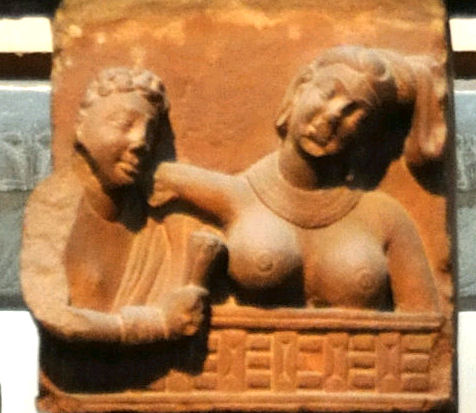
Detail on the centre pillar.

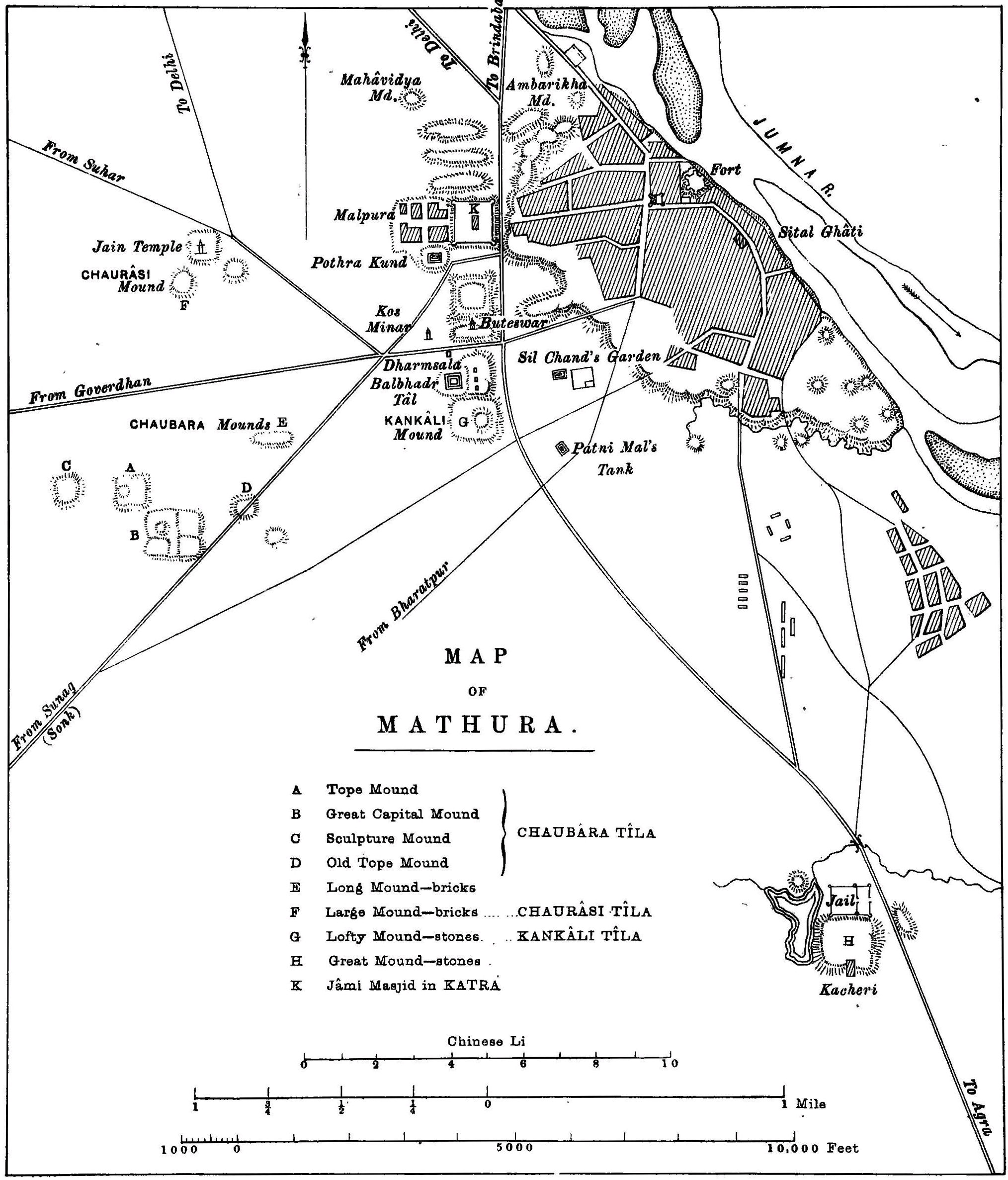
Location of Bhutesvara (here "Buteswar", next to Kankali Tila), right outside old Mathura.

== Back of the pillars ==
The backs of the pillars contain reliefs with scenes from the life of the Buddha, and from Jataka tales about his previous lives. One in Mathura has the story of the sage Rishyasringa, seduced by a woman.

Images from Kolkata unless stated

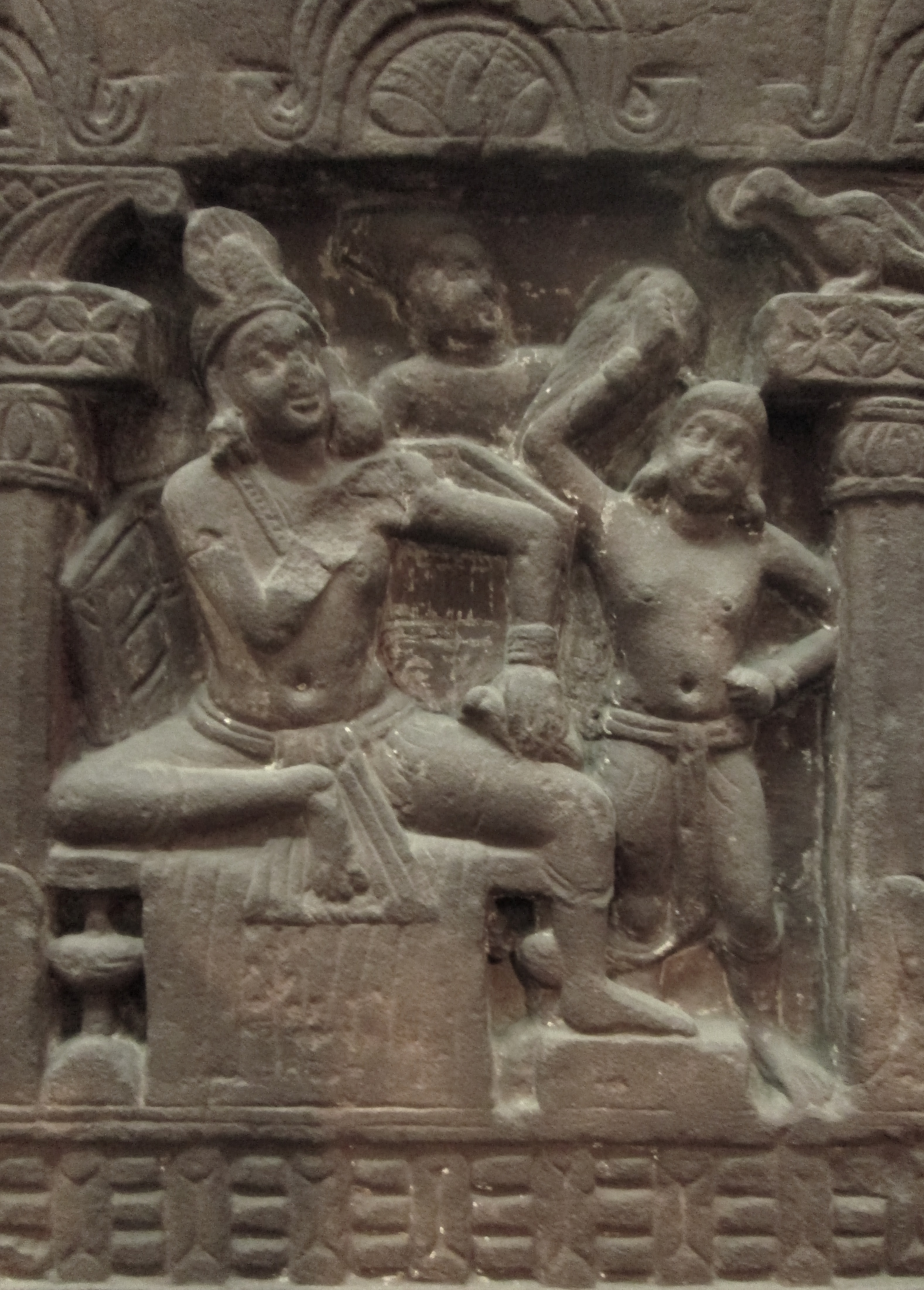
1A: Sibi Jataka. King Sibi was the Buddha in a previous life.

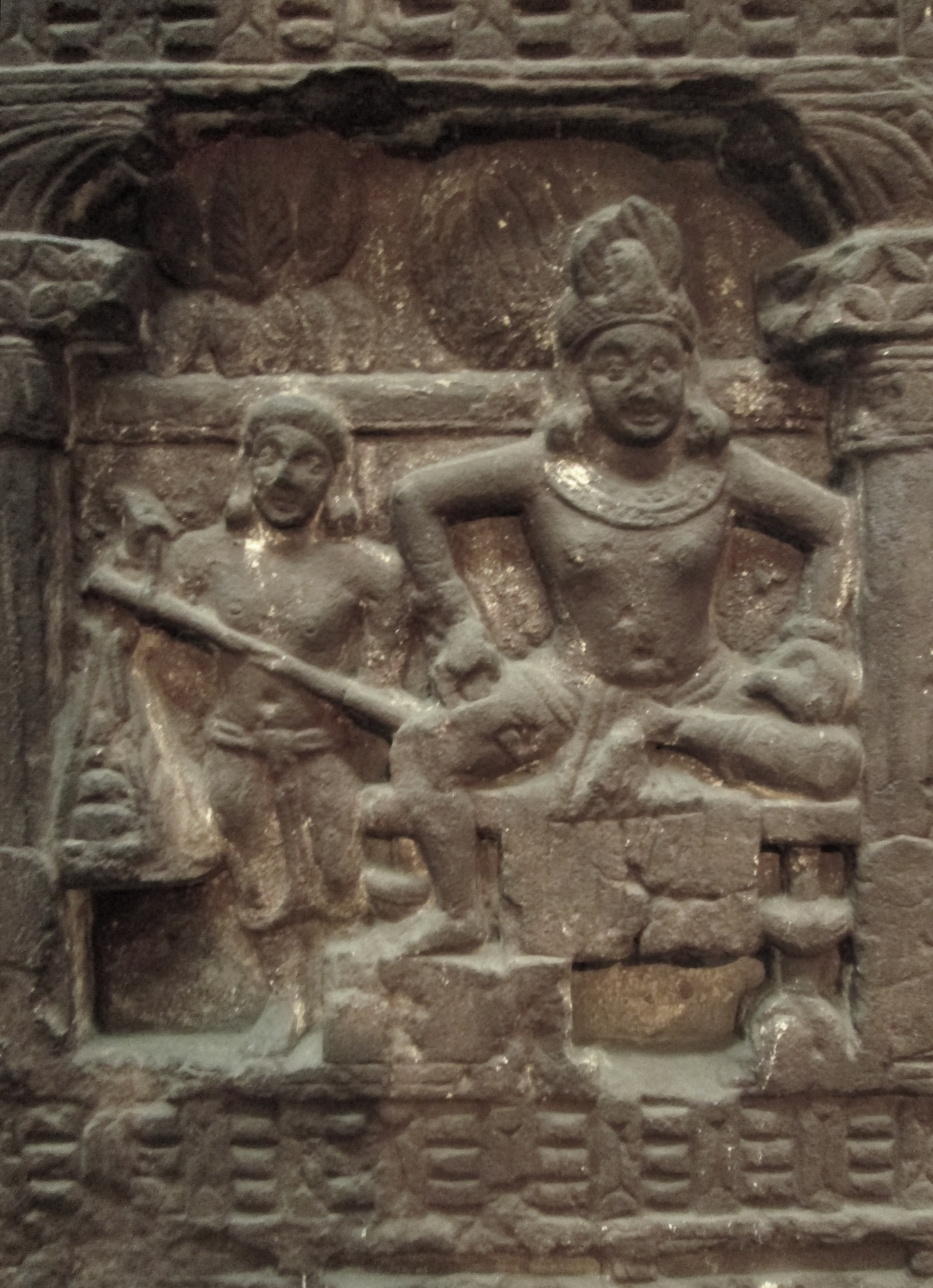
1B: Sibi Jataka. King Sibi gives some of his own flesh to the wounded.

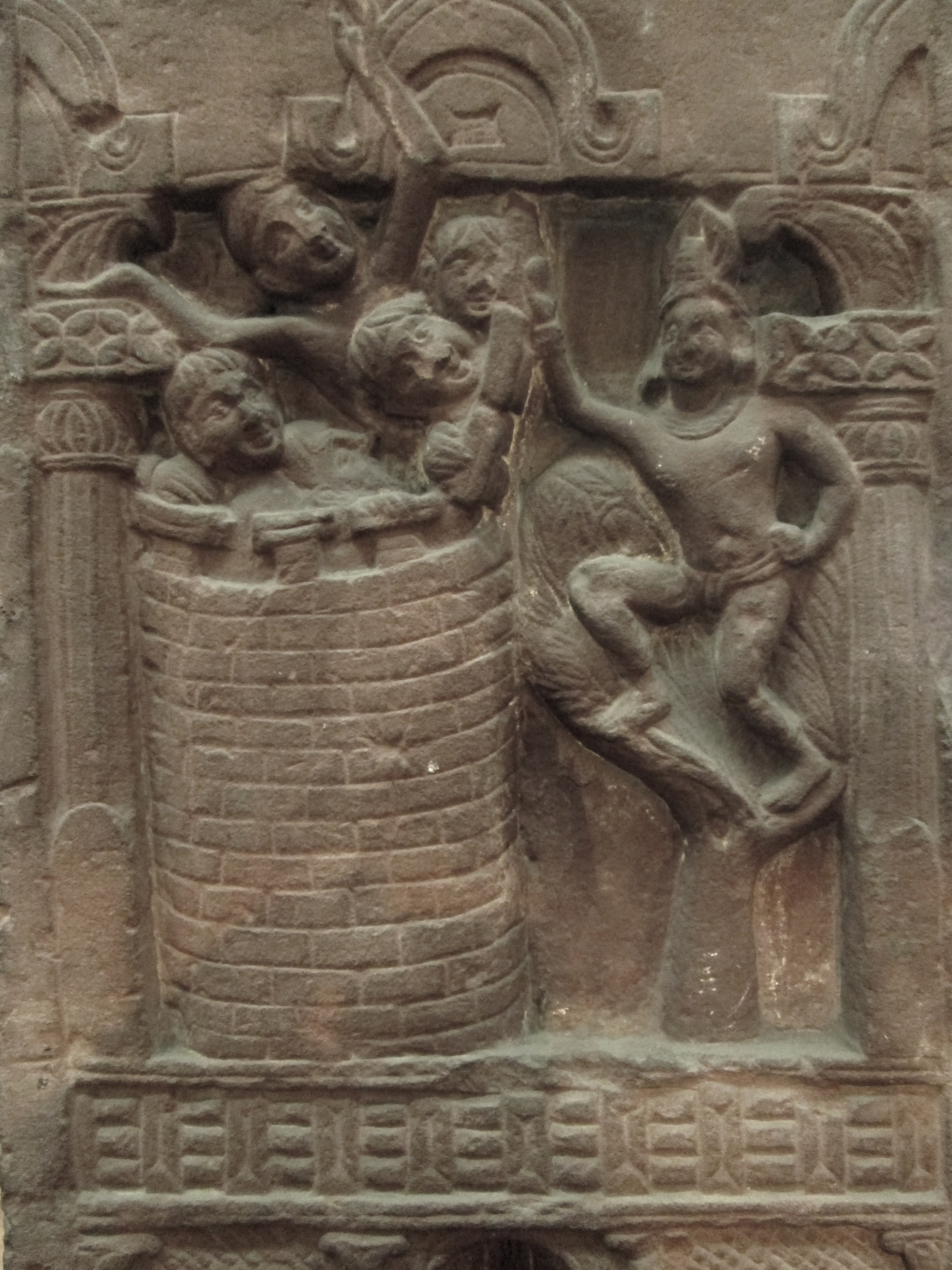
2A: Sibi Jataka, Viswakarma returns to Heaven after witnessing the deeds of King Sibi, saying King Sibi will soon become a Buddha.

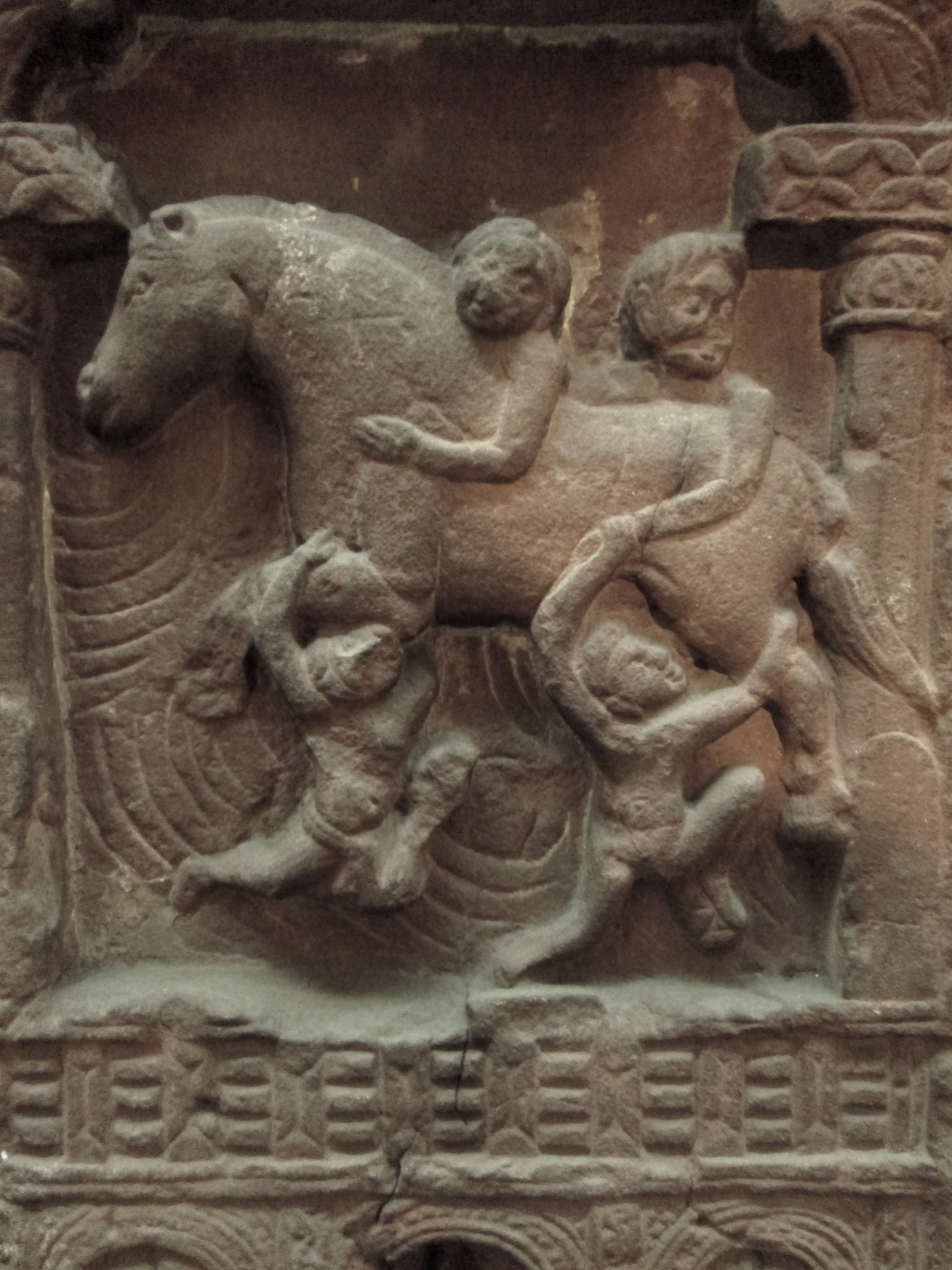
2B: The Great Departure of Siddharta, the Buddha-to-be, from Kapilavastu.

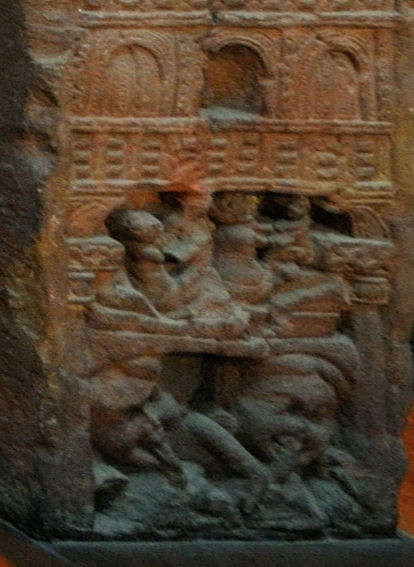
2C: Festivities and monsters (possibly in the city of Kapilavastu).

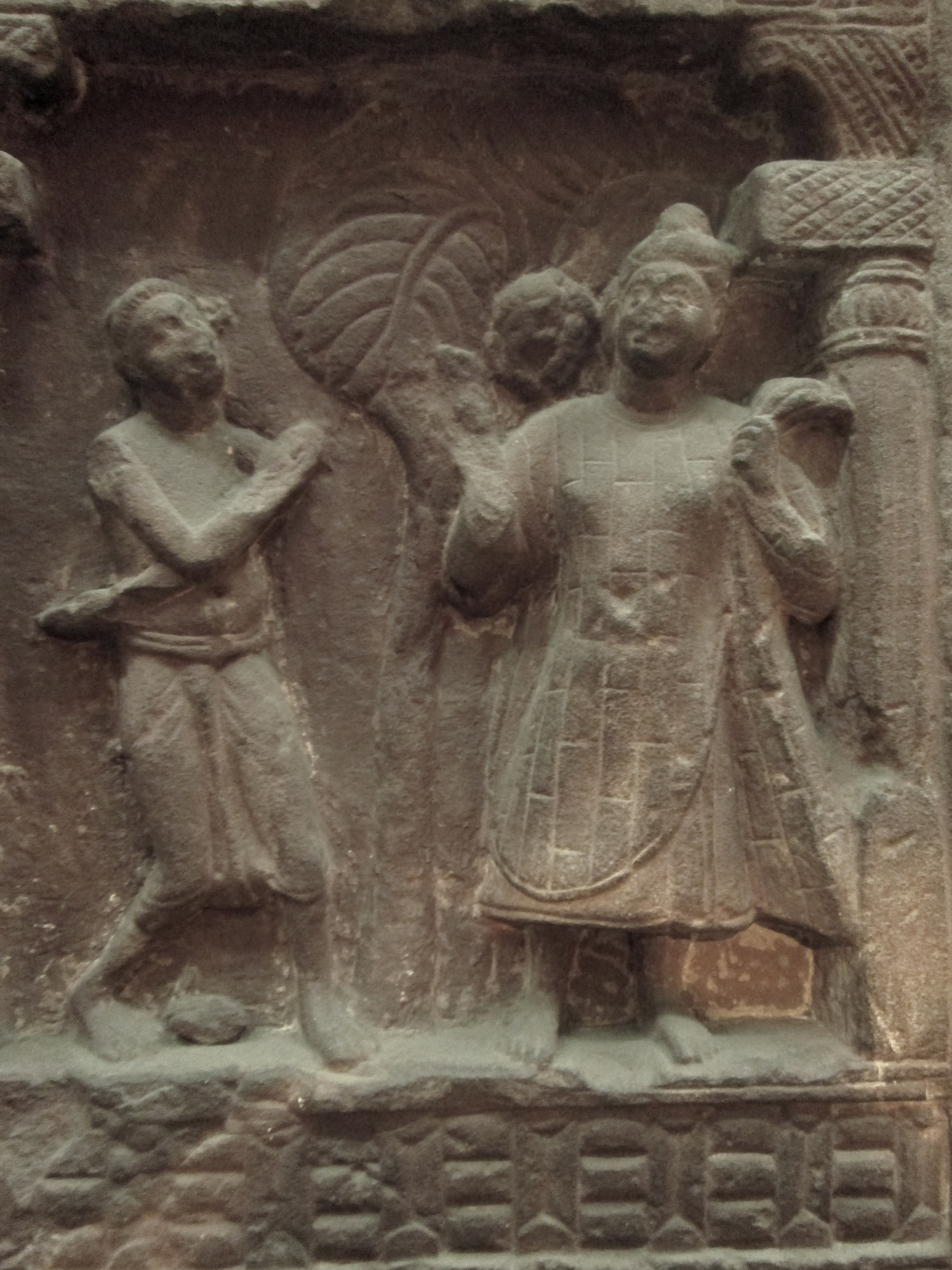
3A: Subjugation of Nalagiri.

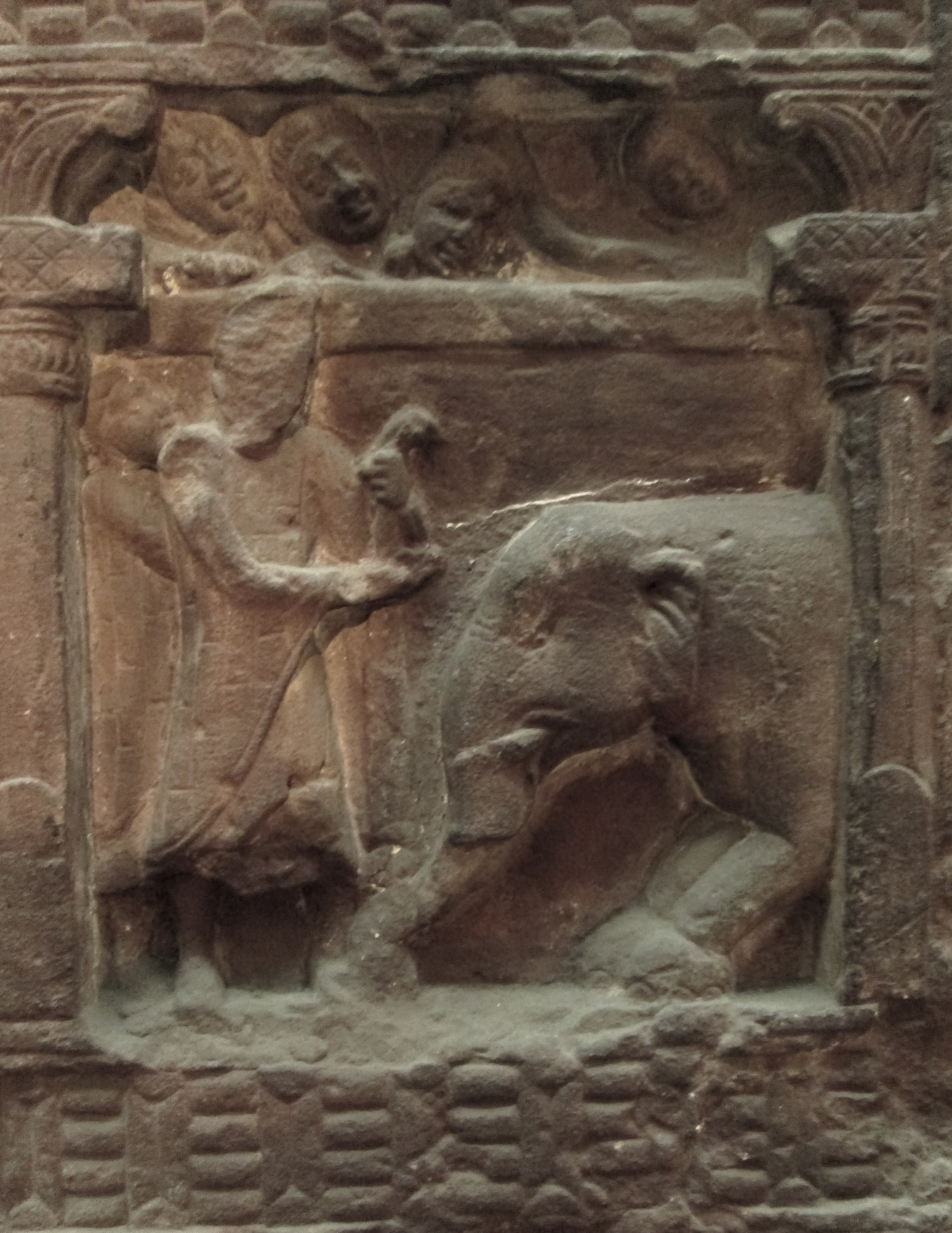
3B: The Buddha subjugating the elephant Nalagiri.

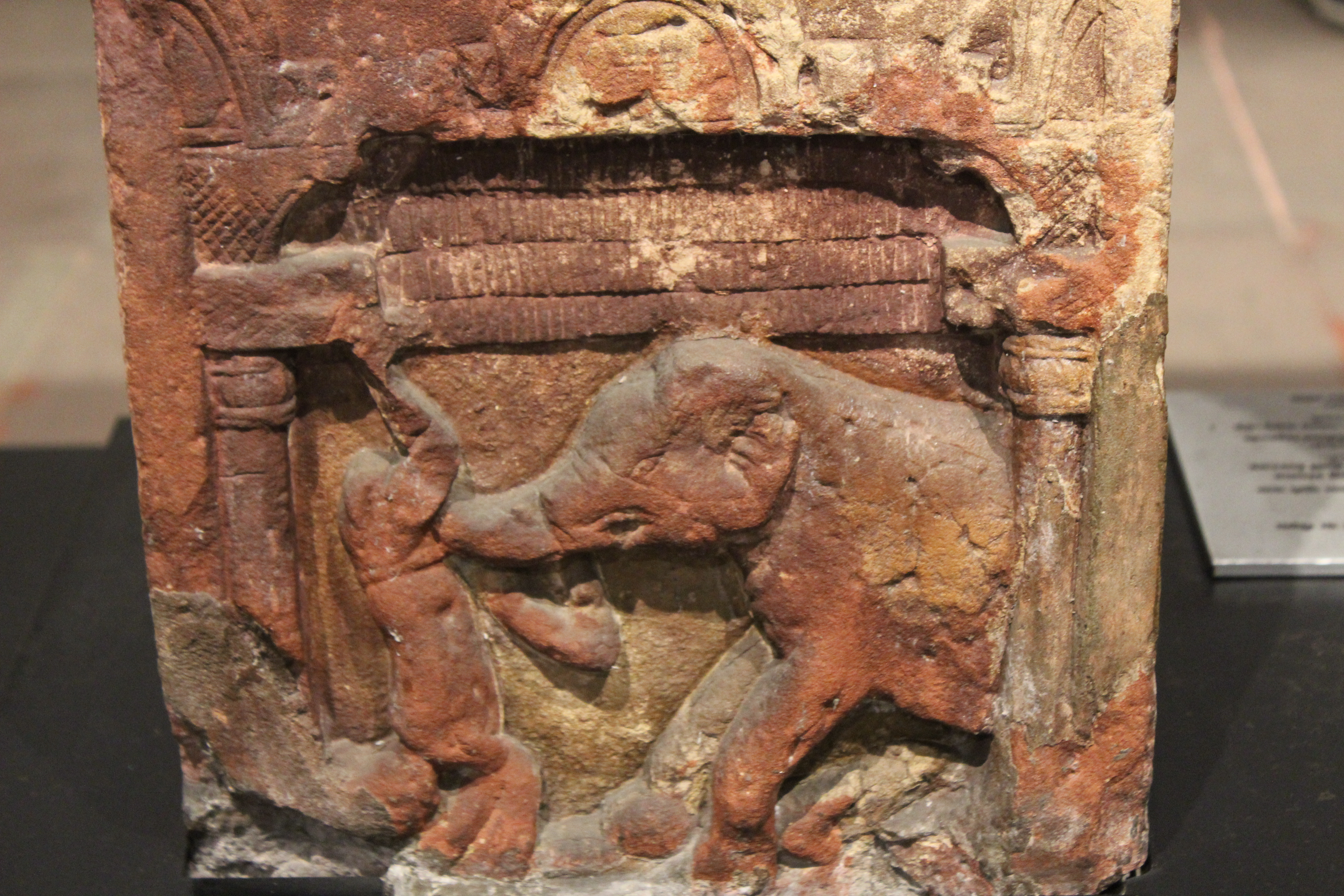
3C: The elephant Nalagiri attacking someone.

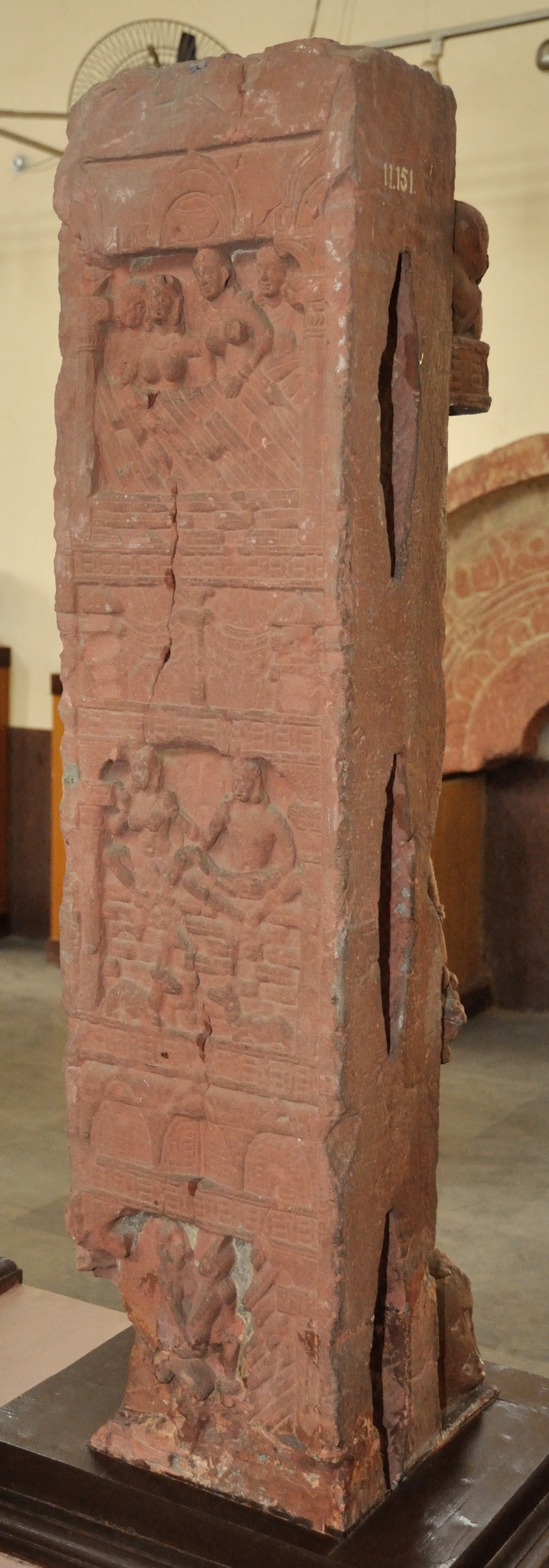
Story of Rishyasringa; reverse of Mathura Yakshi Carrying Wine Pot and Holding Bunch of Grapes

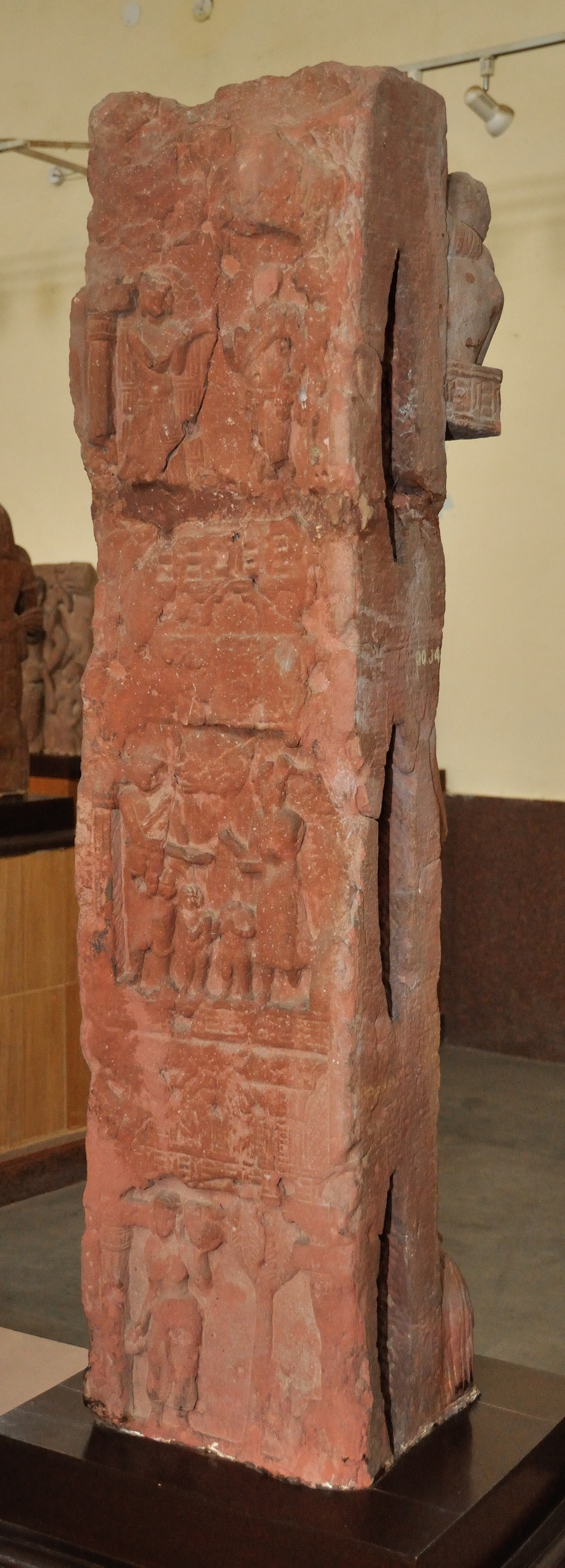
Reverse of Mathura Yakshi Putting on Her Garment After Bath

== See also ==
- Mathura Herakles
