= Mathura Herakles =

Statue of Herakles in Mathura, India

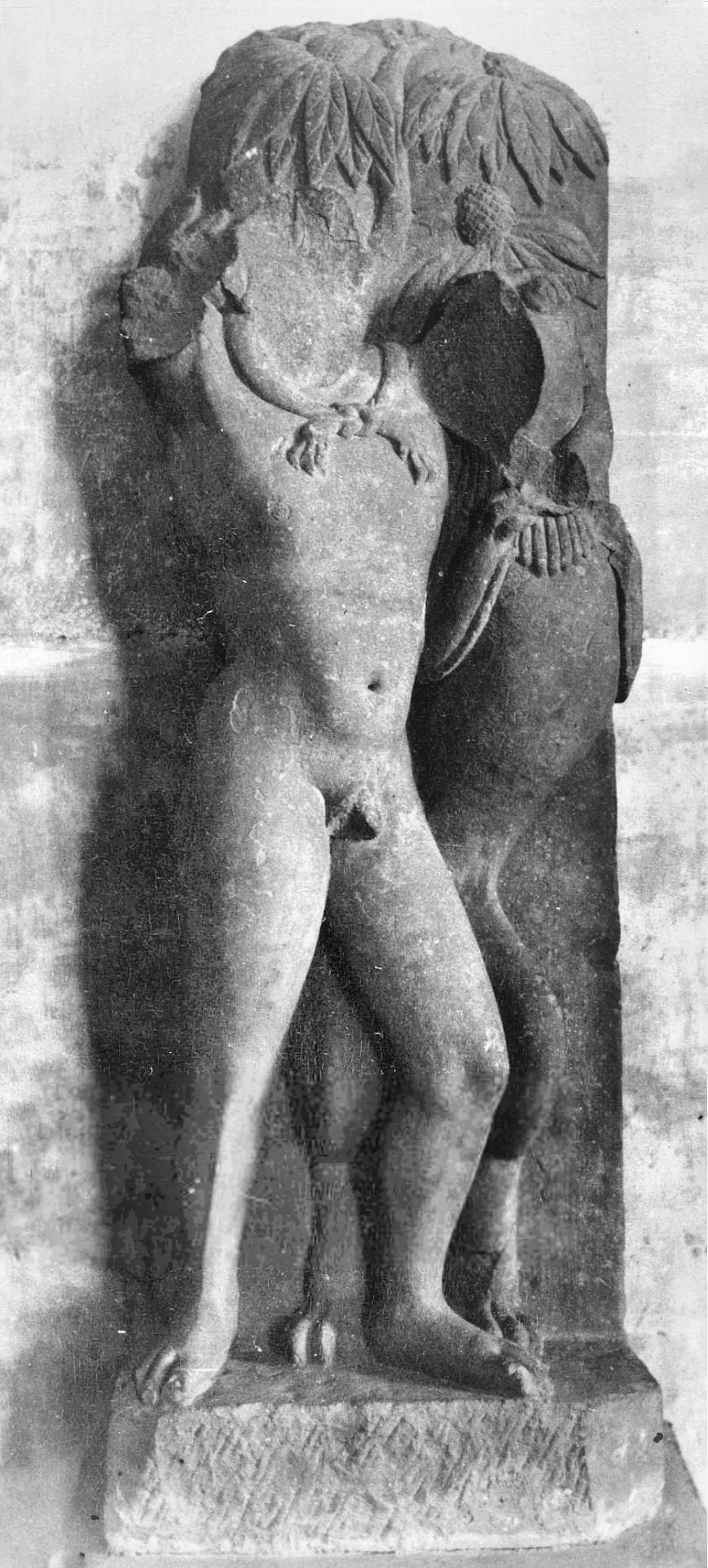
- Mathura statue of Herakles strangling the Nemean lion.
- Material: red sandstone
- Size: 74 cm tall
- Period/culture: 2nd Century CE
- Discovered: 27°36′00″N 77°39′00″E
- Place: Mathura, India.
- Present location: Indian Museum, Kolkata, India

Location

The Mathura Herakles is a famous statue found in the city of Mathura, India, thought to represent the Greek hero Herakles fighting the Nemean lion.

== History ==
The statue was discovered at the end of the 19th century by Alexander Cunningham in Mathura. It depicts a defaced male strangling a lion. It has been interpreted as a sculpture created by a foreign artist that shows Herakles strangling the Nemaean lion. However, the male is wearing lion's skin, the legs of which are tied around his neck, which has been interpreted as proof that the foreign artist lacked full knowledge of the Greek mythology, because he is shown already wearing the skin of the lion he is fighting.

The man fighting the lion in the scene is very generally considered as being Herakles, but some authors have suggested that an Indian sculptor, influenced by western art, could have meant to represent Krishna for example. It may also be connected to the cult of Vasudeva, who is thought to have been corresponded to the legend of Herakles.

The statue is now in the Indian Museum in Kolkata.

== Significance ==
The statue is similar to statues of the Lycian Apollo. On its discovery, Cunningham wrote that the statue must be of Herakles and the Nemaean lion, that there is high probability that this was sculptured by some foreign artist for the use of the Greek resident of Mathura. It is generally considered as an example of influence from the Greek art on ancient Indian art. According to James Harle, there is "no Gandharan sculpture whose source can be so directly traced" to Greece as the Mathura Herakles.

== Gallery ==
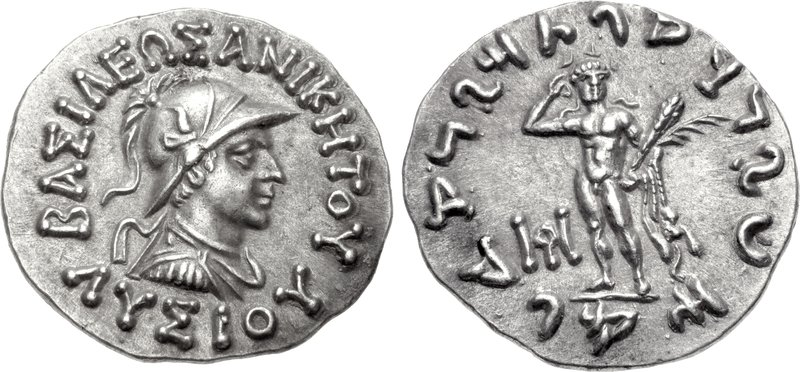
Herakles on the reverse of the Indo-Greek coinage of Lysias, 130-125 BCE.

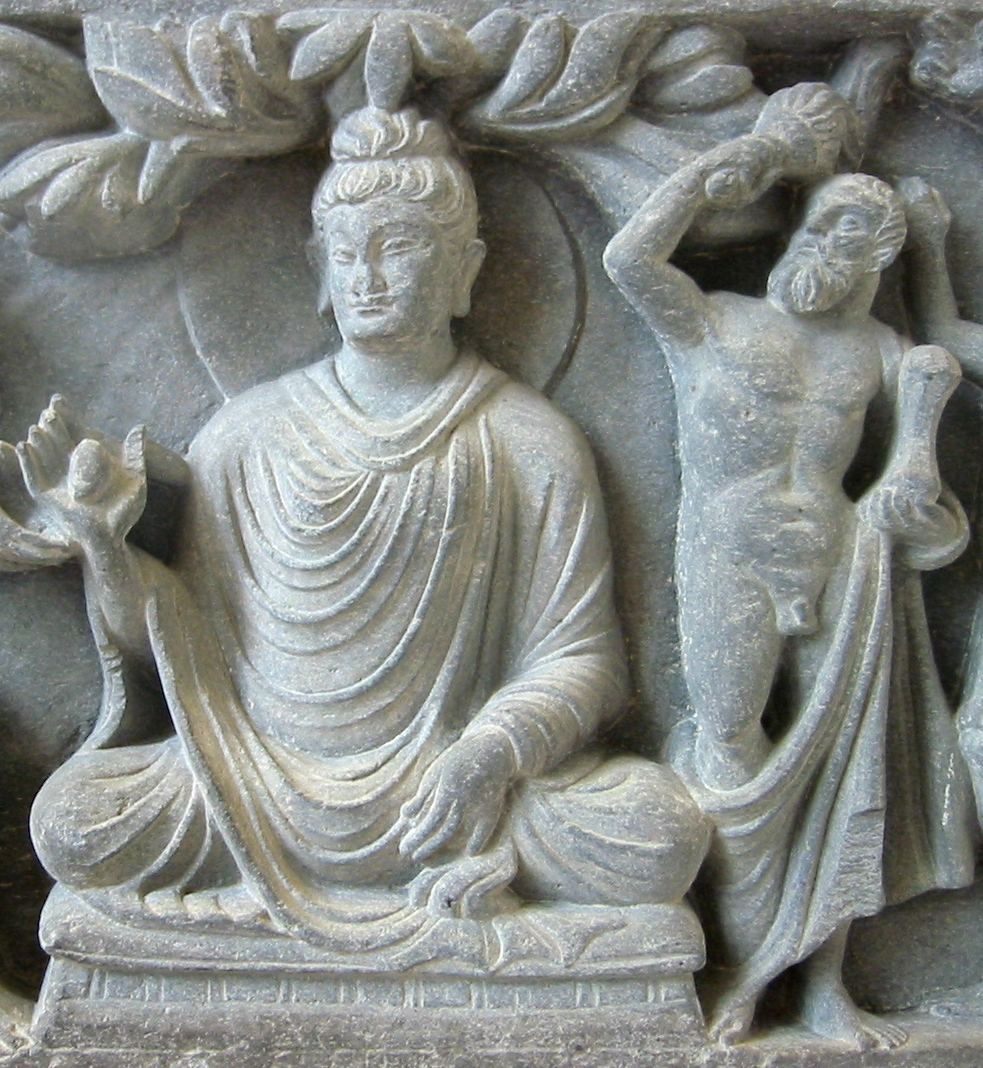
Herakles as Vajrapani, protector of the Buddha.

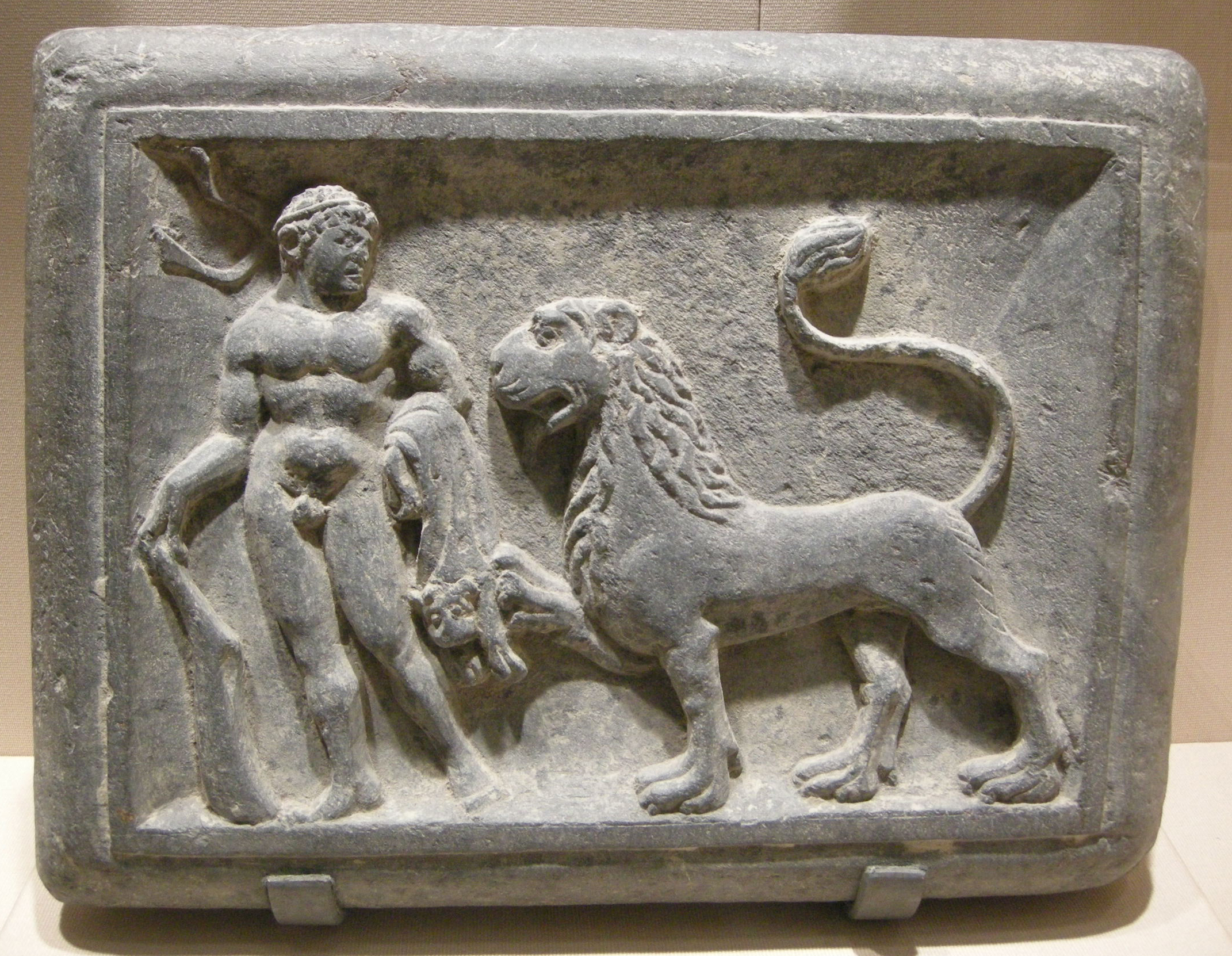
Herakles with the Nemean lion, Gandhara.

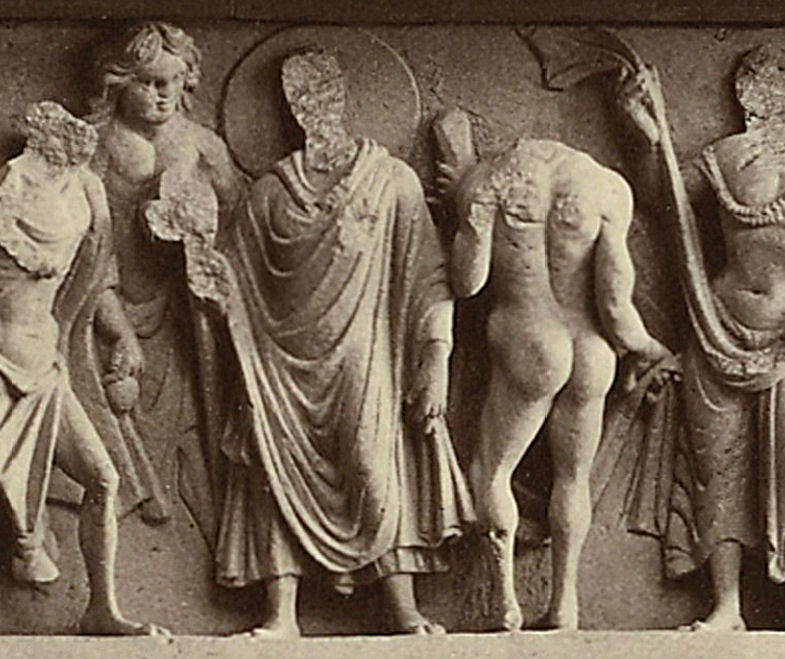
Herakles as Vajrapani

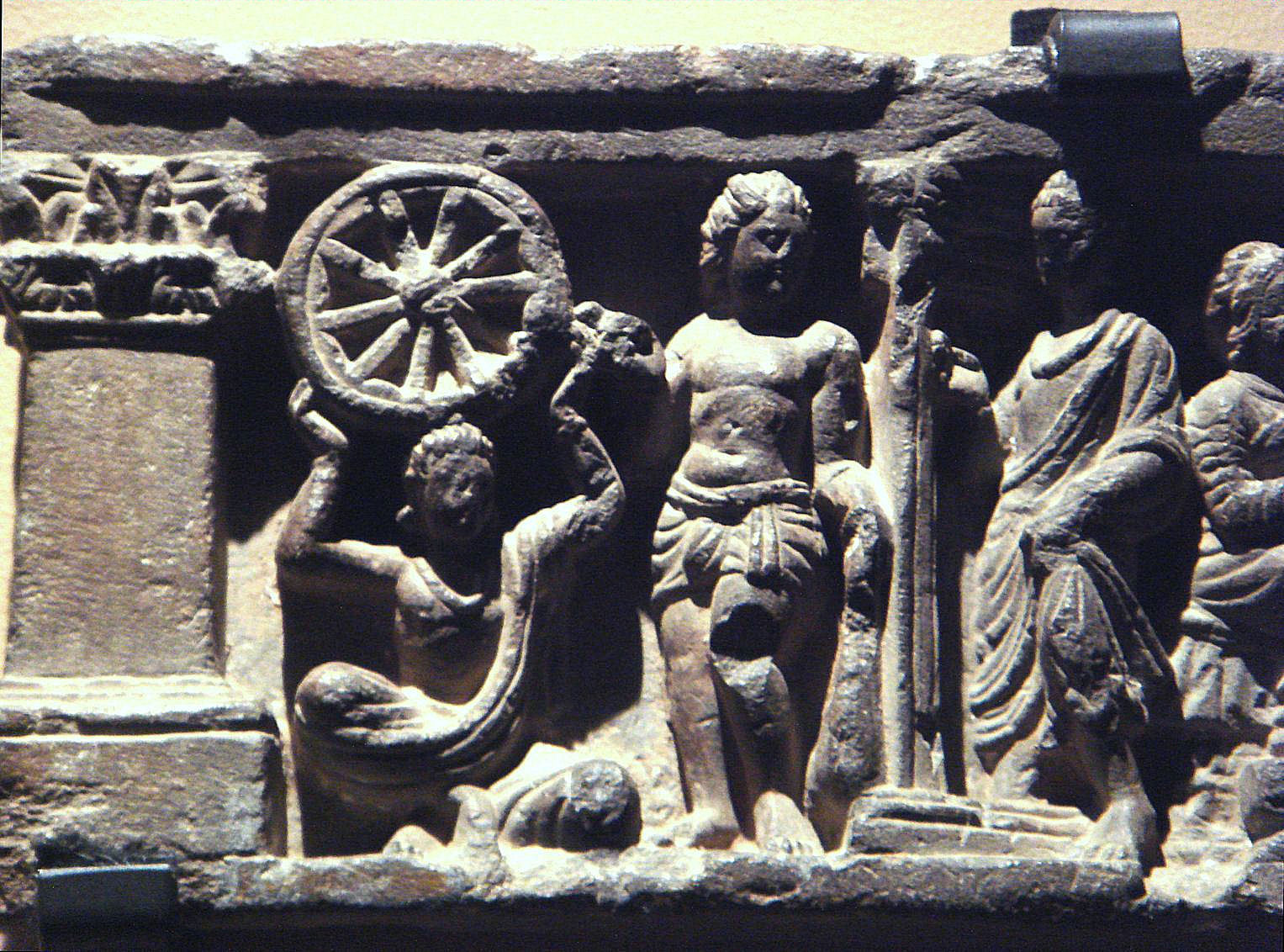
Herakles/Vajrapāni with the Buddha, holding the Heraklean club.

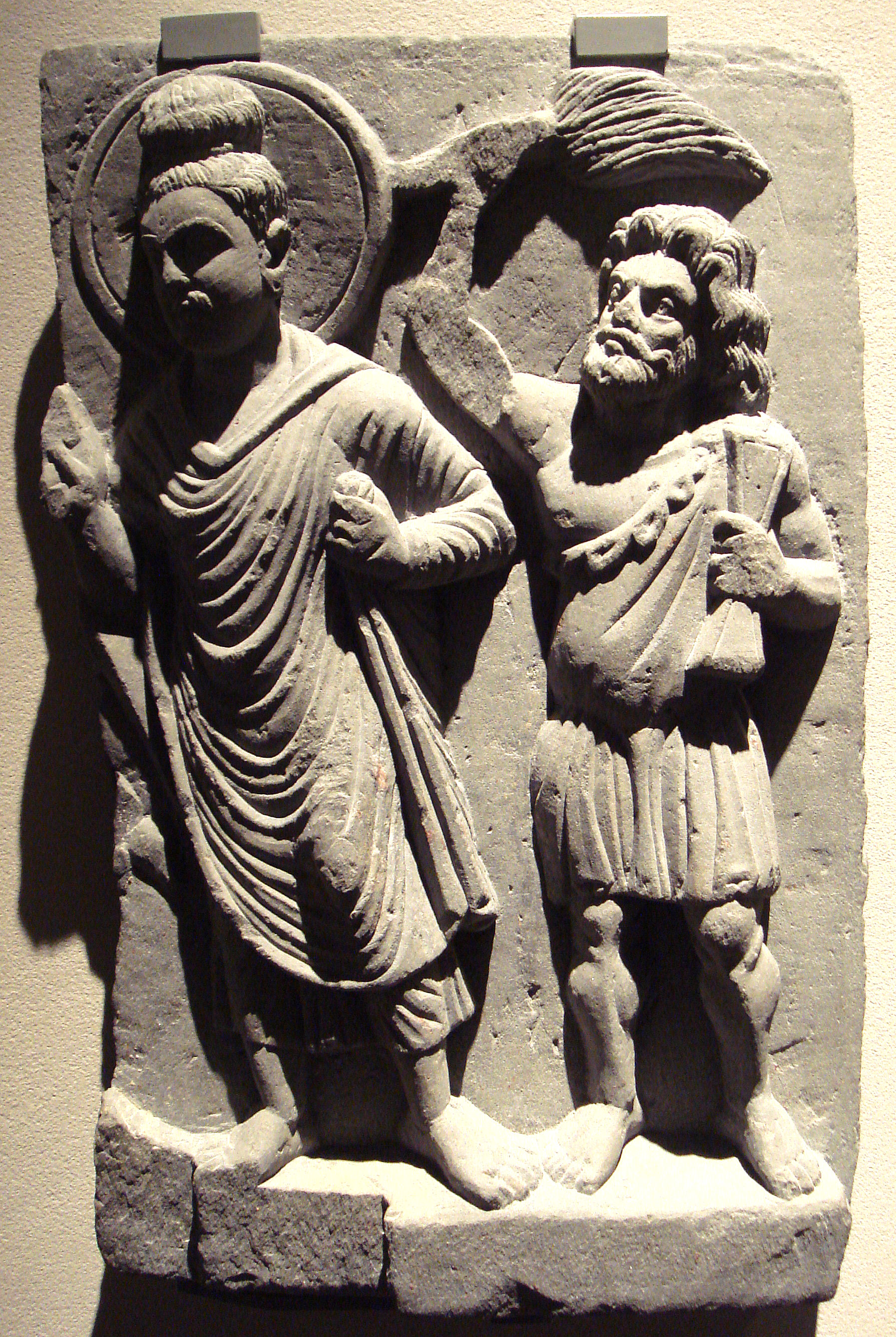
The Buddha with his protector Vajrapāni. Gandhara, 2nd century CE.

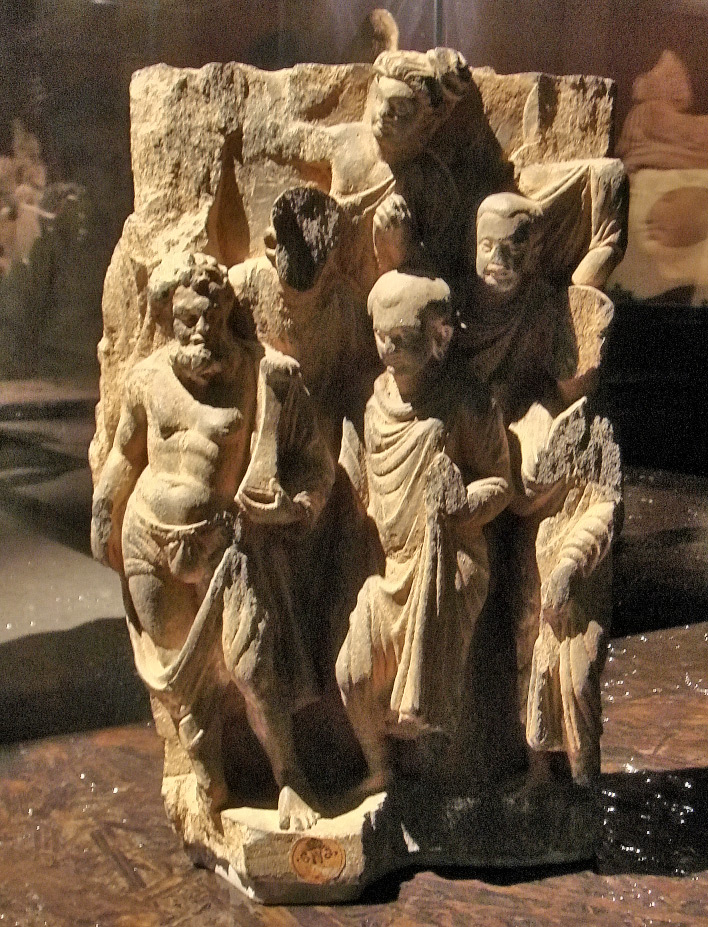
Herakles/Vajrapāni with a group of Buddhist monks. Gandhara

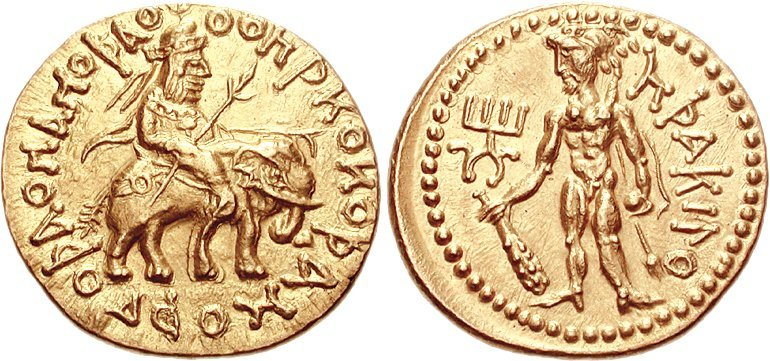
Herakles on the reverse of a Kushan coin of emperor Huvishka (140-180 CE).

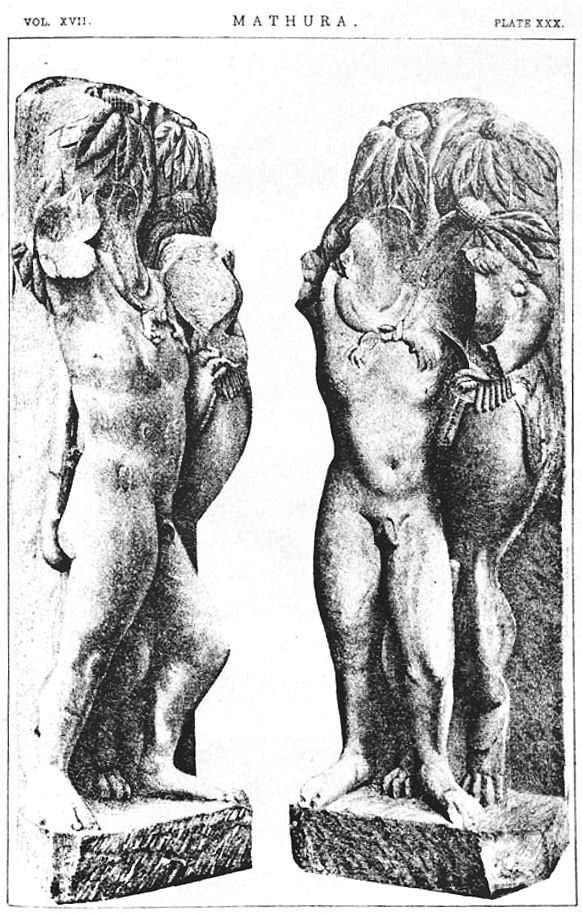
Mathura Herakles.

== See also ==
- Mathura art
- Megasthenes' Herakles
- Bhutesvara Yakshis
