= Sibi Jataka =

Buddhism tale

Shibi Jataka is one of the Jataka tales detailing episodes of the various incarnations of Buddha. Each Jataka tale illustrates the Buddhist ideals of Dhamma and sacrifice in various forms. Tradition states that these tales were narrated by Buddha himself during his ministry in India to emphasise that by the constant practice of virtuous deeds one reaches the status of Nirvana or enlightenment.

== The Story of King Sibi ==
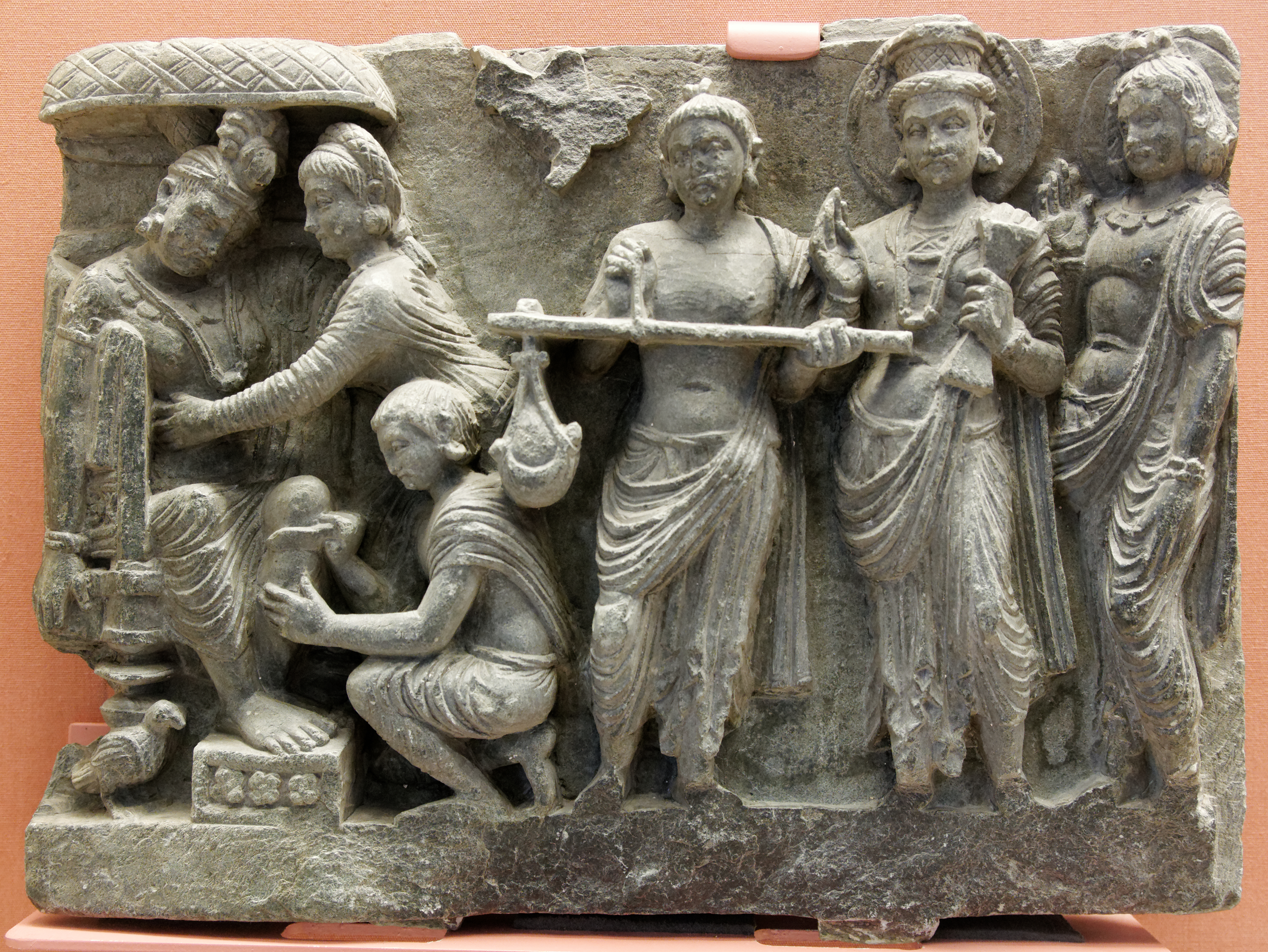
Slab with the Shibi Jataka, Gandhara, 2nd–3rd century AD, British Museum

Arvind Sharma describes the story of King Shibi in the following terms,

"As he sat in the court one day, a sparrow sought refuge in his lap, while being chased by a falcon. The falcon demanded the sparrow from the king as it constituted his means of subsistence. Accepting the falcon’s right, the king offered his own flesh in order to fulfill his duty of protecting his subjects."

== Variations ==
There are many versions of the Shibi Jataka and the one narrated above is also found in the Mahabharata as the story of a king called Shibi. Another version of the story of Shibi is narrated as follows:

"Indra came as a blind person to King Shibi and asked him to donate one of his eyes so that he could regain his sight partially. Sibi, however, offered both eyes for the complete restoration of the blind man's sight. The ready willingness of king Sibi to sacrifice both his eyes moved Indra into revealing his true form and blessing the king."

In the Chinese Buddhist tradition, the two versions of the story are attributed to two different kings. The king who sacrifices his eyes is called Kuai-mu Wang - the king with happy eyes.

== Cave Paintings ==
The story is depicted in numerous Buddhist cave paintings. An example of this can be found in Cave 17 at Ajanta. This shows a man holding a set of scales while the king is engaged in cutting his flesh out. The panel also shows the king’s courtiers, and subjects rejoicing this noble act of their king. A painting in the Mogao Caves (Cave 275) shows a panel illustrating five jataka tales. The two versions of the Sibi legend are depicted in this panel.

== Connections with the Chola Dynasty ==
The story of King Shibi has been linked with the South Indian dynasty of Cholas who ruled between c 100 C.E. to c. 1250 C.E. The later Cholas claimed to have descended from Shibi. The Tamil name for Shibi was Sembiyan. This name was assumed by many Chola kings.

== See also ==
- Jātaka
- List of Jatakas
- Mahanipata Jataka
- Paññāsa Jātaka
- Shibi (king)
